= List of fire stations =

This is a list of notable current and former fire stations, which are also called "fire houses", "fire halls", "engine houses", "hook and ladder companies" and other terms. It includes combination buildings, such as city halls or other government buildings that include a fire station. This list is intended to include all historic fire stations which have formally been listed on historic registers, as well as modern ones notable for their architecture or other reasons.

This list is not intended to cover fire department buildings that are purely administrative. Nor does it cover specialty buildings serving as fire alarm headquarters or pumping stations for water supply systems dedicated to firefighting; for these see List of fire department specialty facilities. Note the term "engine houses" may refer to other collections of engines, e.g. for supplying power to factories; these are covered in a separate list of engine houses.

Narrow towers rising above many fire station buildings are hose towers, for purpose of cleaning and drying fire hoses. But some have fire lookout towers, some have bell towers or clock towers and some have firefighting training towers or "drill towers".

== Australia ==
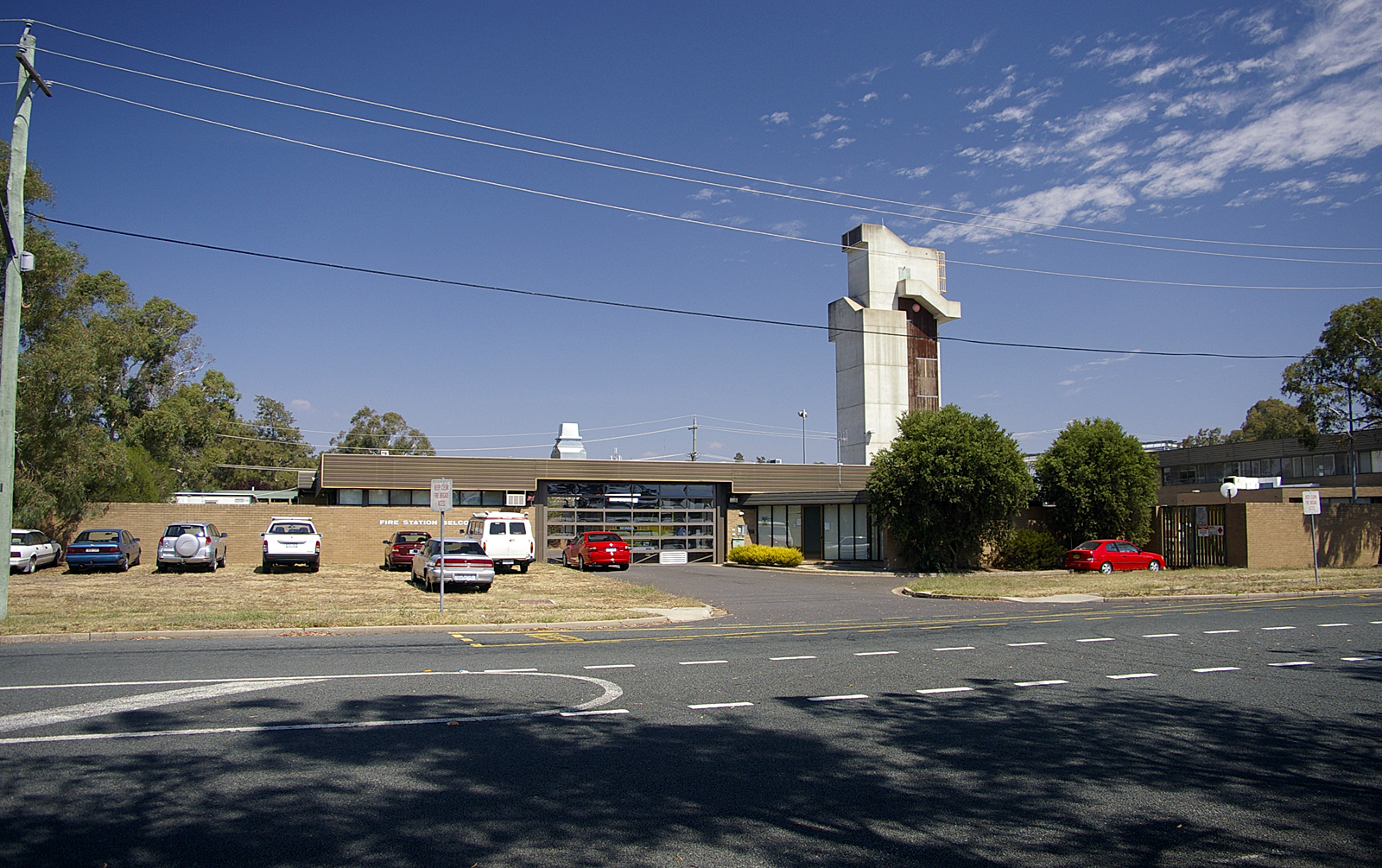
Belconnen Fire Station, Canberra, Australian Capital Territory, with what appears to be a training tower

=== New South Wales ===
- Berry Fire Station
- Crows Nest Fire Station

=== Queensland ===
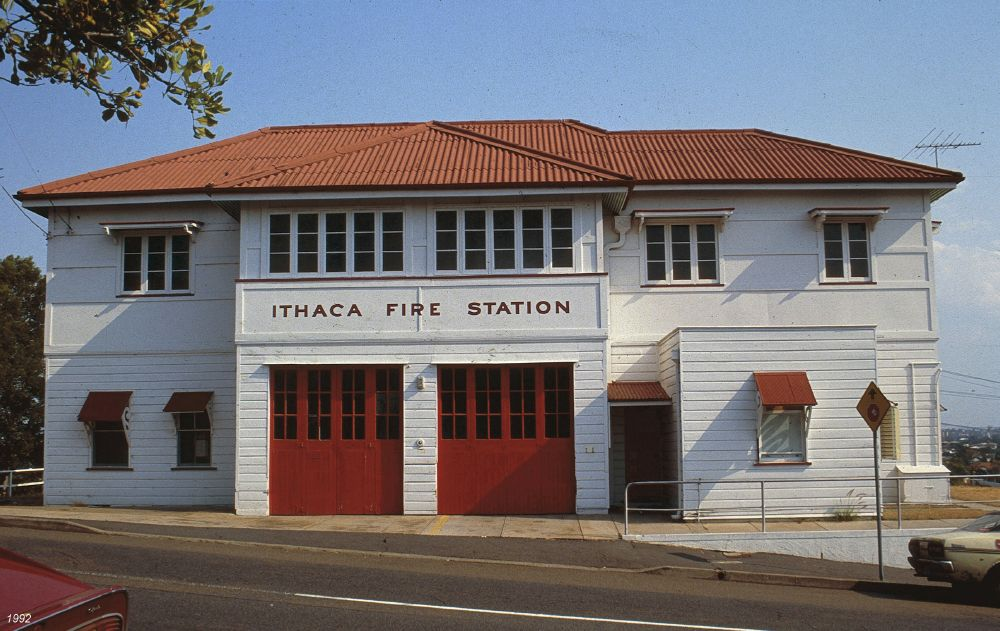
Ithaca Fire Station

- Albion Fire Station (1925–27)
- Balmoral Fire Station (1926–29)
- Coorparoo Fire Station (1935)
- Dalby Fire Station (1935)
- Ithaca Fire Station (1918–19)
- Nundah Fire Station (1936)
- Redcliffe Fire Station (1948–49)
- Wynnum Fire Station (1922–38)
- Yeronga Fire Station (1934)

=== South Australia ===
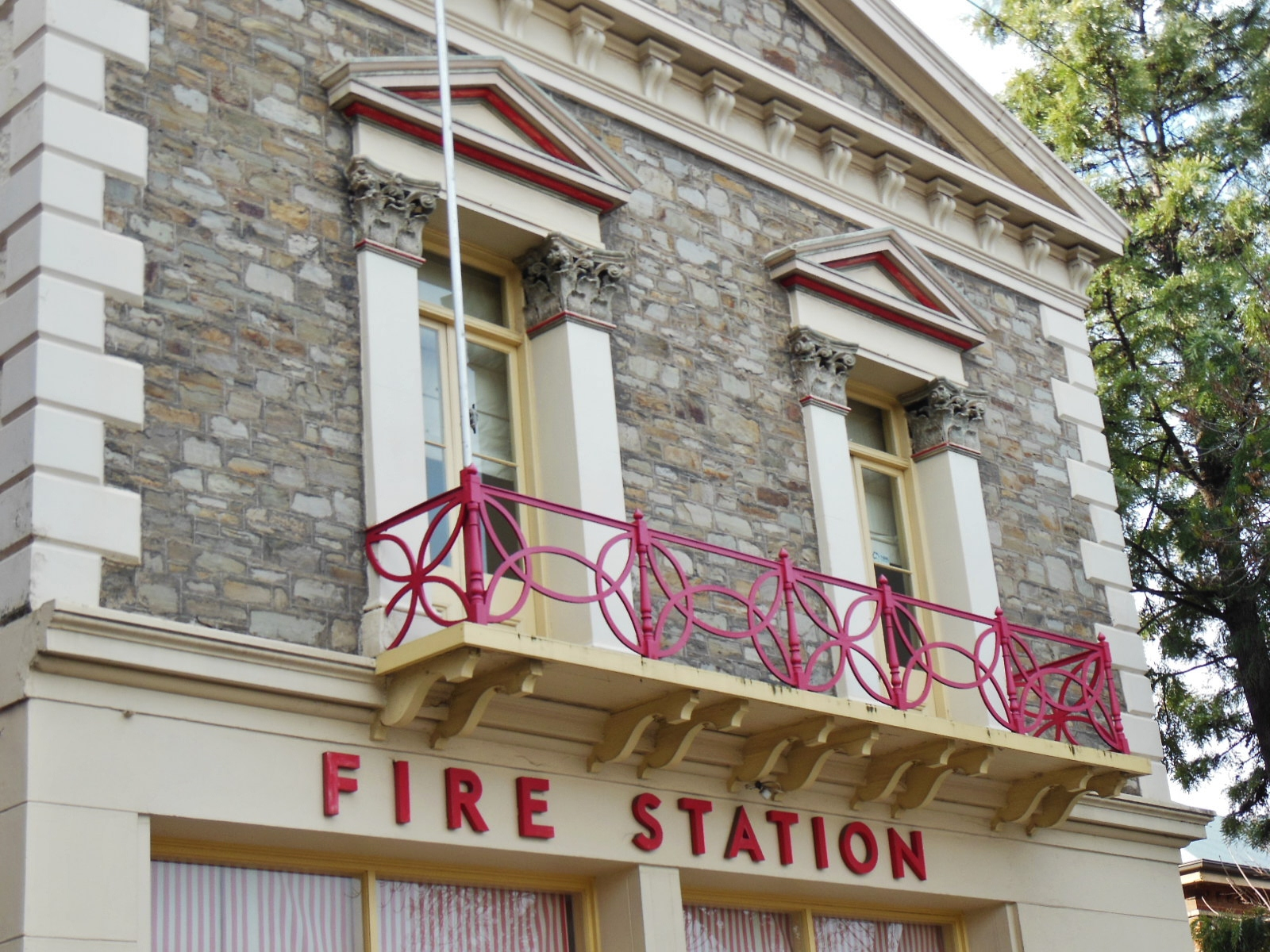
Former North Adelaide Fire Station

- Adelaide Fire Station

Former stations

- Hindmarsh Fire and Folk Museum
- Mount Gambier Fire Station
- North Adelaide Fire Station
- Unley Fire Station, now the home of the Unley Museum

=== Victoria ===
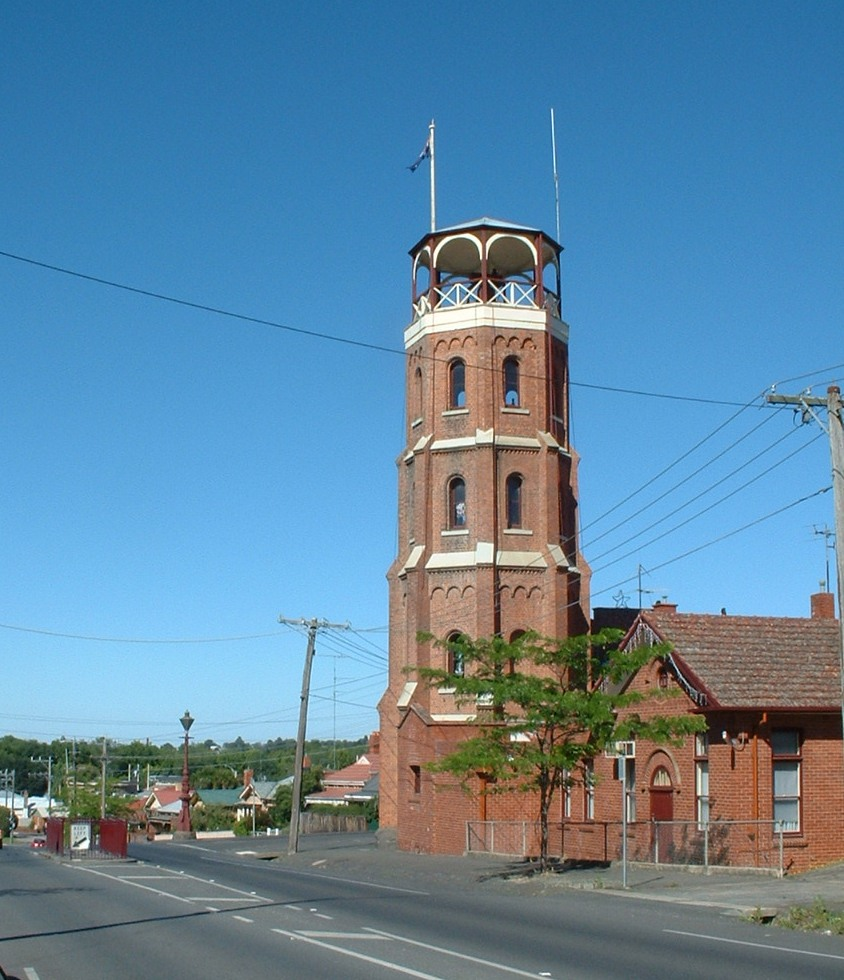
Ballarat East Fire Station, with fire lookout tower, and one end of world's first operating telephone line

- Ballarat East Fire Station (1858), one end of the world's first operational telephone, and the oldest continuously operating fire station in the Southern Hemisphere
- Ballarat Fire Station (1860), the other end
- Bendigo Fire Station (1898–99)
- Brunswick Fire Station and Flats (1938)
- Carlton Fire Station
- Elsternwick Fire Station (1896)
- Hawthorn Fire Station
- Keilor Fire Station
- Maryborough Fire Station belltower
- Prahran Fire Station (1889)
- Richmond Fire Station (1893)
- Richmond Metropolitan Fire Station (1905–10)
- St Arnaud Fire Station

Former stations

- Eastern Hill Fire Station, Melbourne, now the Fire Services Museum of Victoria
- Walhalla Fire Station

=== Western Australia ===
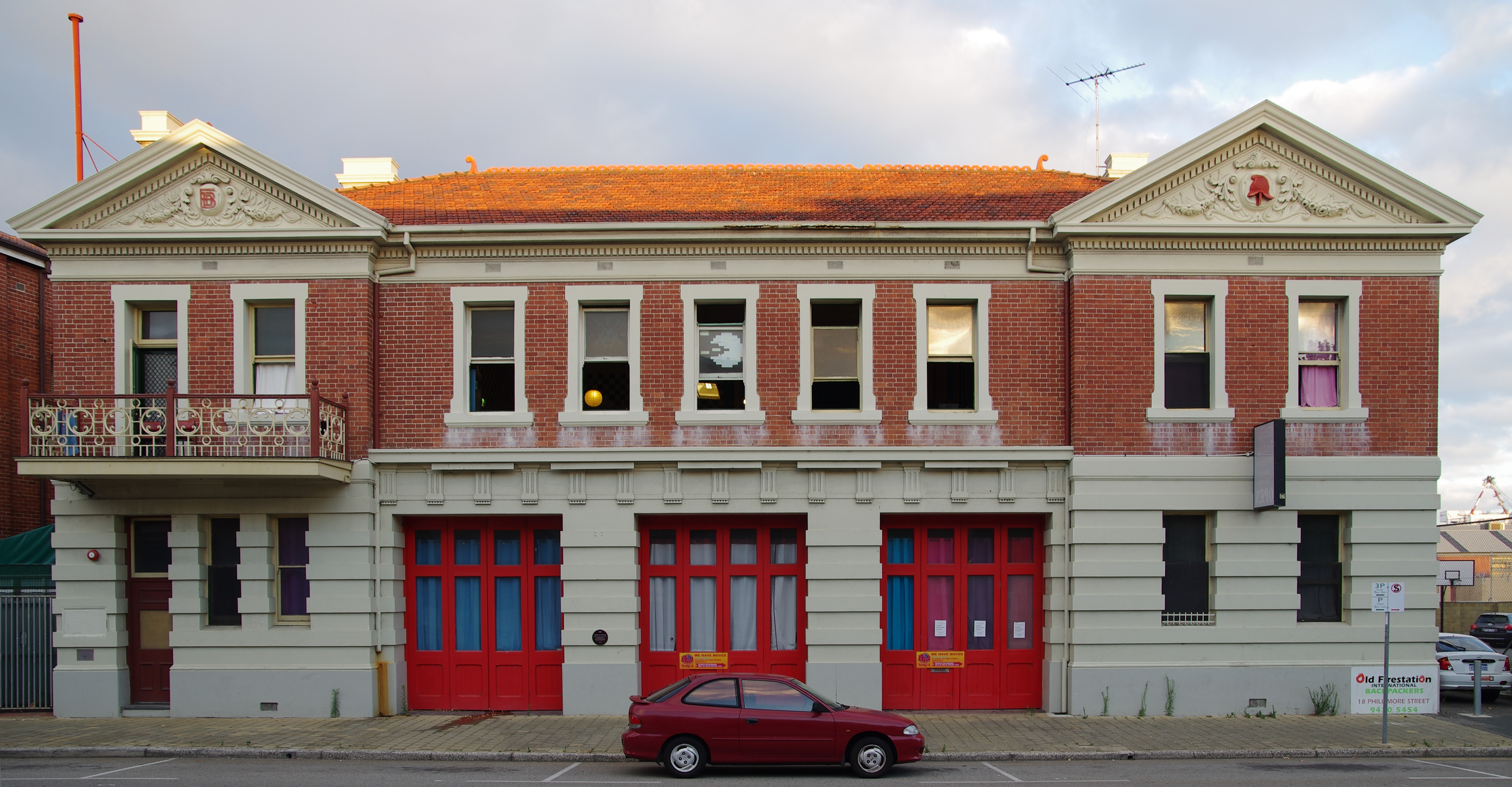
Fremantle Fire Station

- Bassendean Fire Station
- Fremantle Fire Station
- Toodyay Fire Station
- York Fire Station

Former stations

- Old Perth Fire Station, Perth, the first purpose-built fire station in Western Australia, home of Fire & Emergency Services Education and Heritage Centre
- No. 1 Fire Station, 25 Murray St, Perth, home of the Western Australian Fire Brigade Museum

== Bangladesh ==
=== Khulna ===
==== Khulna District ====
- Khulna Fire Station
- Khalishpur Fire Station
- Daulatpur Fire Station
- Khan Jahan Ali Fire Station
- Tootpara Fire Station
- Khulna Land-Cum River Fire Station
- Khulna River Fire Station
- Rupsha Fire Station
- Dumuria Fire Station
- Dakope Fire Station
- Batiaghata Fire Station
- Terokhada Fire Station

== Canada ==
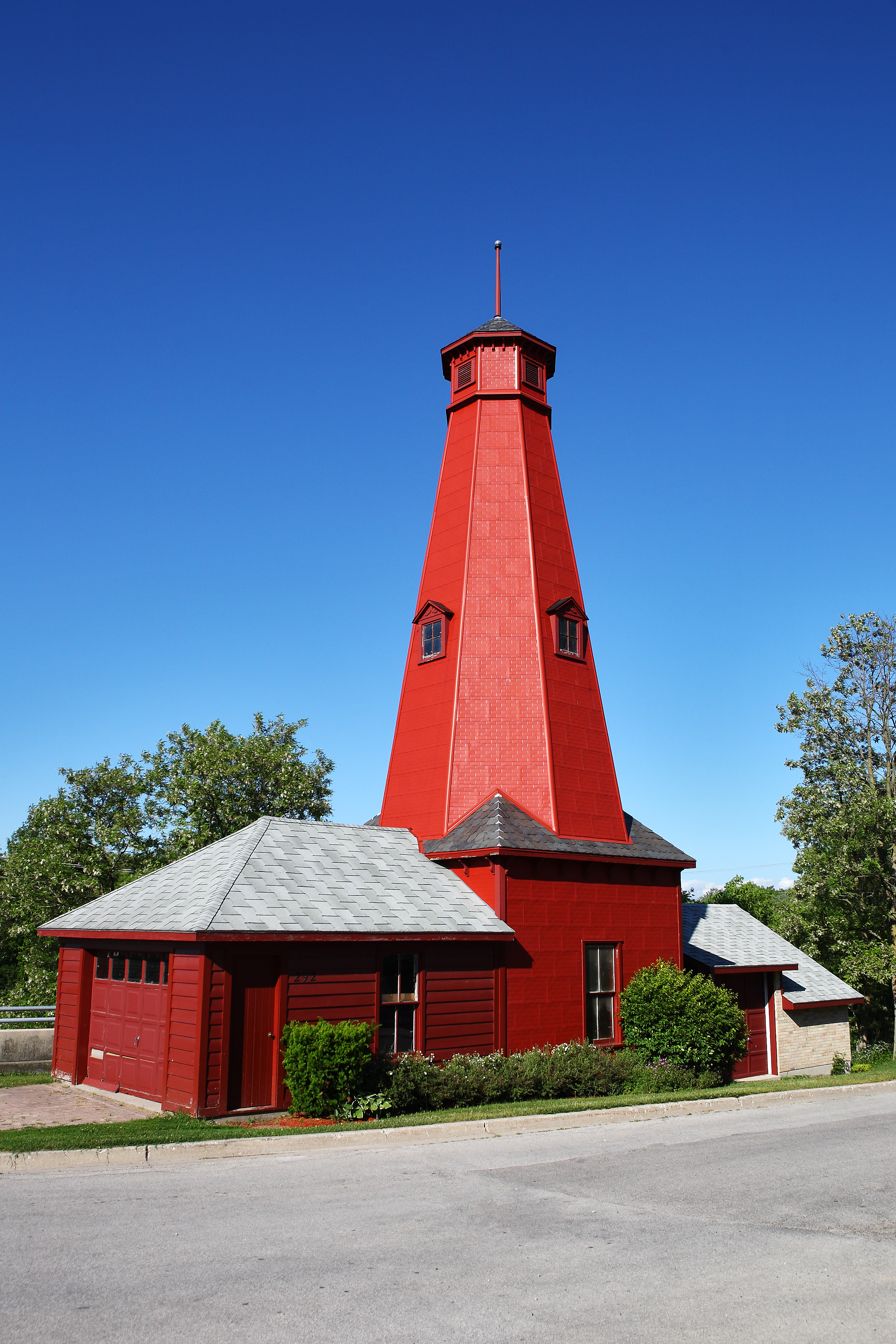
Paisley, Ontario hose tower

- The Walterdale Playhouse, Edmonton, Alberta
- Firehall Arts Centre, Vancouver, British Columbia
- Historic hose tower, Paisley, Ontario
- No. 8 Hose Station, Toronto, Ontario
- List of historic Toronto fire stations, Ontario
- Caserne de pompiers, Chambly, Quebec, photo here
- Prince Albert Historical Museum, Prince Albert, Saskatchewan, in the city's 1912 fire hall

Former

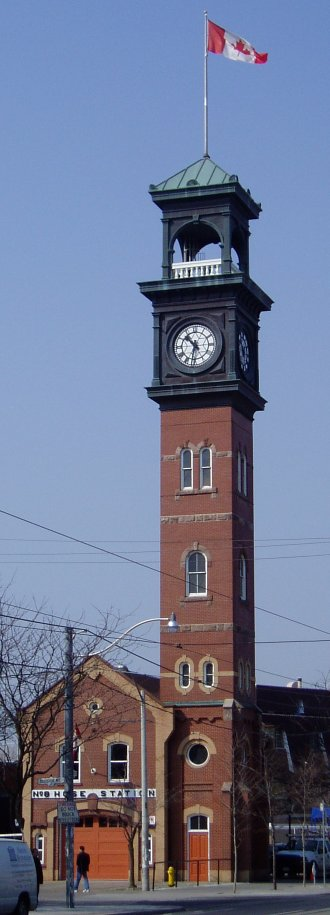
Former Fire Hall No. 3, Toronto

- The Old Fire Hall, Toronto, Ontario
- Former Fire Hall No. 3, Saskatoon, Saskatchewan
- Fire Fighters Museum (Winnipeg, Manitoba), in a 1904 fire station building

== China ==
- Fire Services Museum, Macau, in a historic fire station

== Denmark ==
- Aarhus Fire Station
- Copenhagen Central Fire Station
- Frederiksberg Fire Station
- Gentofte Fire Station

== Estonia ==
- Estonian Firefighting Museum, Tallinn, located in a fire station

== Finland ==
- Tampere Central Fire Station (1908)

== France ==
- Champerret barrack, Paris

== Hong Kong ==
- Old Kowloon Fire Station
- Tsim Sha Tsui Fire Station
- Tsing Yi Fire Station
- List of fire stations in Hong Kong

== Italy ==
Fire stations of the Roman Empire Fire Service in Ostia Antica and in Rome

== New Zealand ==
- Lower Hutt Central Fire Station

== Philippines ==
- San Nicolas Fire Station

== Puerto Rico ==
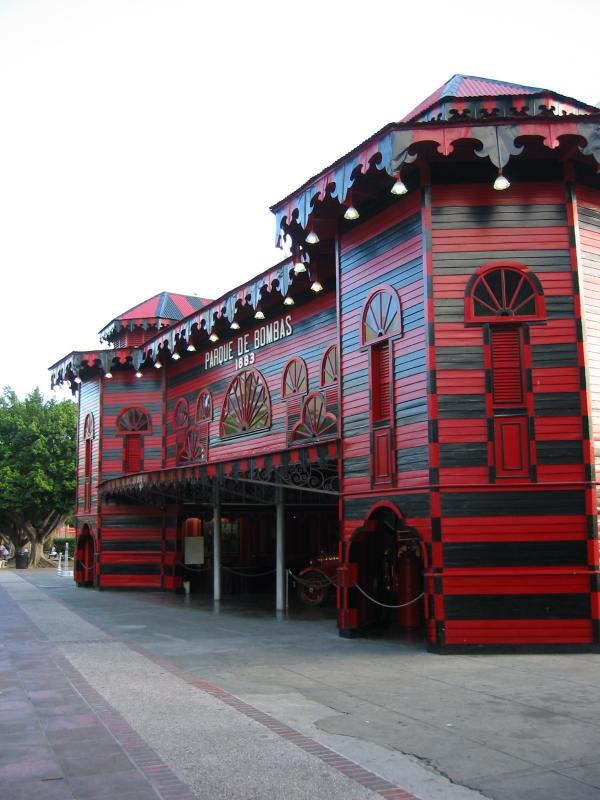
Parque de Bombas de Ponce, Puerto Rico

- Parque de Bombas Maximiliano Merced, Aguas Buenas, PR, NRHP-listed
- Ceiba Fire Station, Ceiba, PR, NRHP-listed
- Parque de Bombas de Ponce, Ponce, PR, NRHP-listed
- Instituto de Música Juan Morel Campos, Ponce, PR, NRHP-listed
- Yabucoa Fire Station, Yabucoa, PR, NRHP-listed

== Russia ==
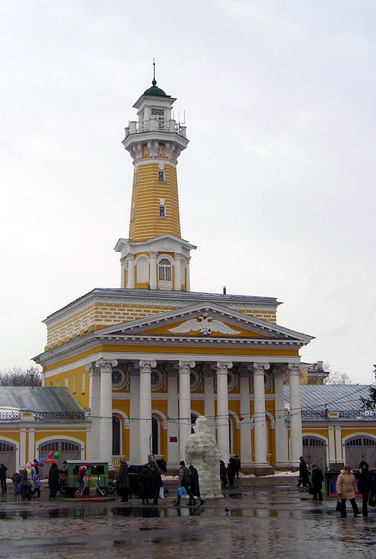
Kostroma watchtower, Russia

- Kostroma watchtower/fire station

== Singapore ==
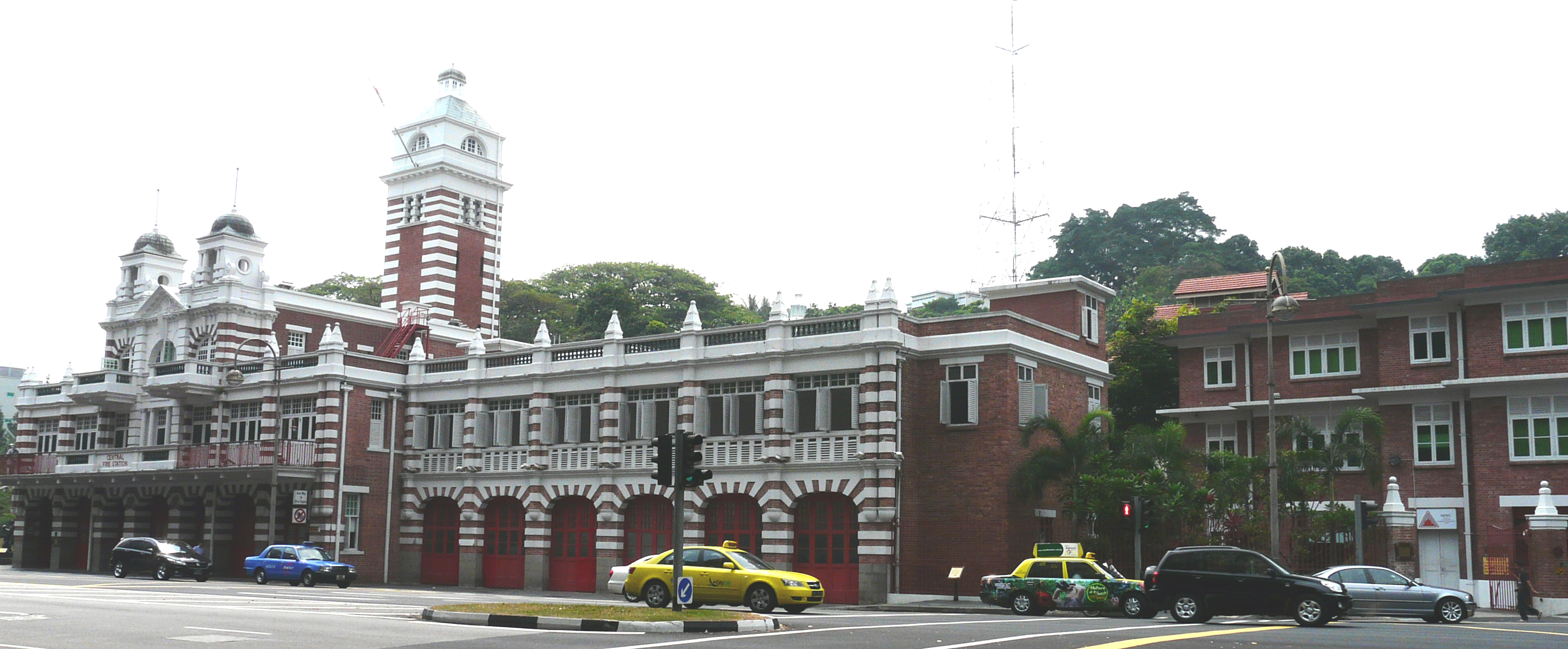
Central Fire Station, Singapore

- Central Fire Station, Singapore

== Taiwan ==
- Hsinchu City Fire Museum, Hsinchu
- Tainan City Fire Bureau Second Division, Tainan

== United Kingdom ==
- Barnet Fire Station, London Borough of Barnet
- Barrow-in-Furness Central Fire Station, Barrow-in-Furness, Cumbria
- Chelsea Fire Station, Chelsea, London
- Chiltern Firehouse, Marylebone, London
- Euston Fire Station, London
- Fulham Fire Station, Fulham, London
- Hammersmith Fire Station, Hammersmith, London
- Lambeth Fire Station, London; former headquarters of London Fire Brigade
- London Road Fire Station, Manchester
- New Cross Fire Station, New Cross, London
- Woolwich Fire Station, Woolwich, London
- National Emergency Services Museum, Sheffield, England, in a former combined police and fire station (1900). It has one of few remaining Fire Brigade observation towers in the UK.
- Preston Circus Fire Station, Brighton

== United States ==
In the U.S., numerous fire stations are listed on the National Register of Historic Places (NRHP) and there are other notable ones as well.

=== Alabama ===
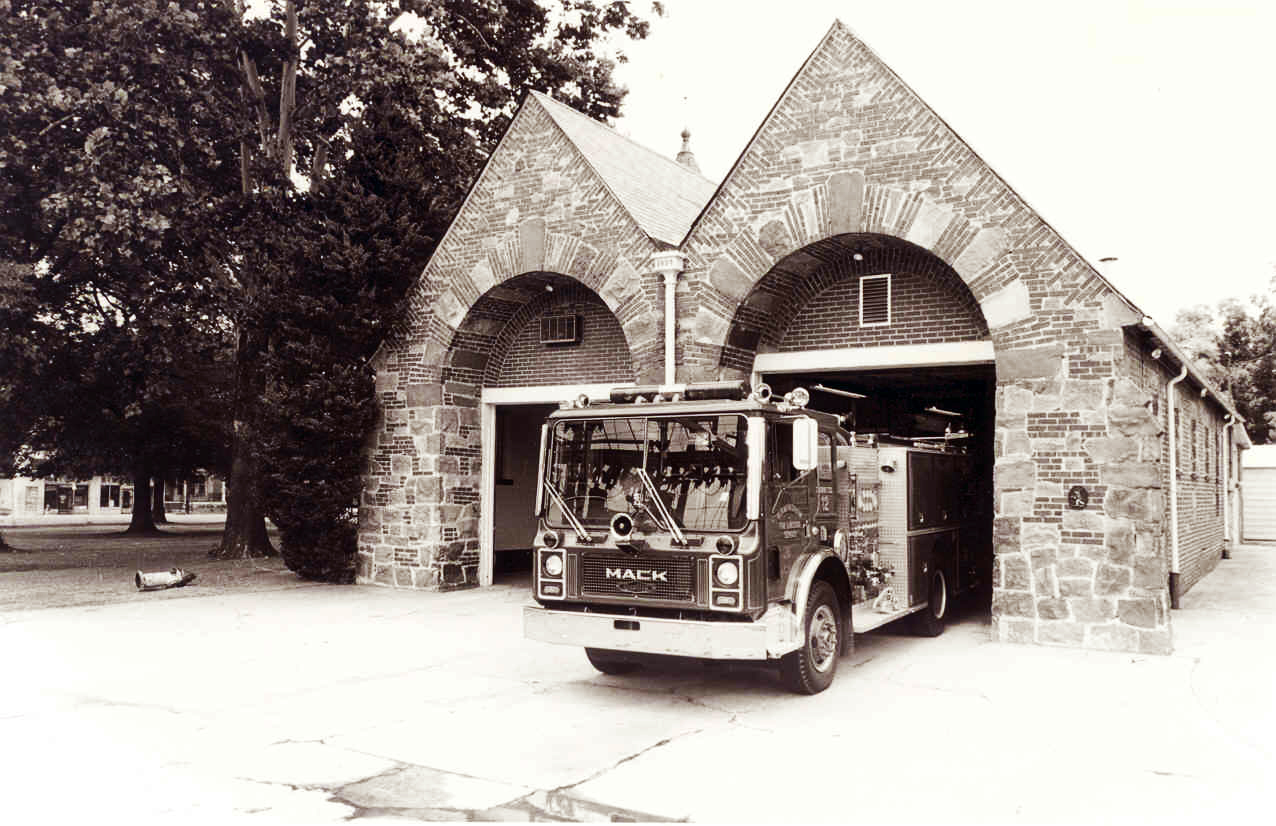
Fire Station No. 12 (Birmingham, Alabama)

- Glen Addie Volunteer Hose Company Fire Hall, Anniston, Alabama, NRHP-listed
- Fire Station No. 3 (Birmingham, Alabama), NRHP-listed
- Fire Station No. 6 (Birmingham, Alabama), NRHP-listed
- Fire Station No. 10 (Birmingham, Alabama), NRHP-listed
- Fire Station No. 11 (Birmingham, Alabama), NRHP-listed
- Fire Station No. 12 (Birmingham, Alabama), NRHP-listed. Tudor Revival in style.
- Fire Station No. 15 (Birmingham, Alabama), NRHP-listed
- Fire Station No. 16 (Birmingham, Alabama), NRHP-listed
- Fire Station No. 19 (Birmingham, Alabama), NRHP-listed
- Fire Station No. 22 (Birmingham, Alabama), NRHP-listed
- Wylam Fire Station, Birmingham, AL, NRHP-listed
- Fire Station No. 5 (Mobile, Alabama), NRHP-listed
- Scott Street Firehouse, Montgomery, AL, NRHP-listed

=== Alaska ===
No notable fire stations known.

=== Arizona ===
- Old Nogales City Hall and Fire Station, Nogales, AZ, NRHP-listed

=== Arkansas ===
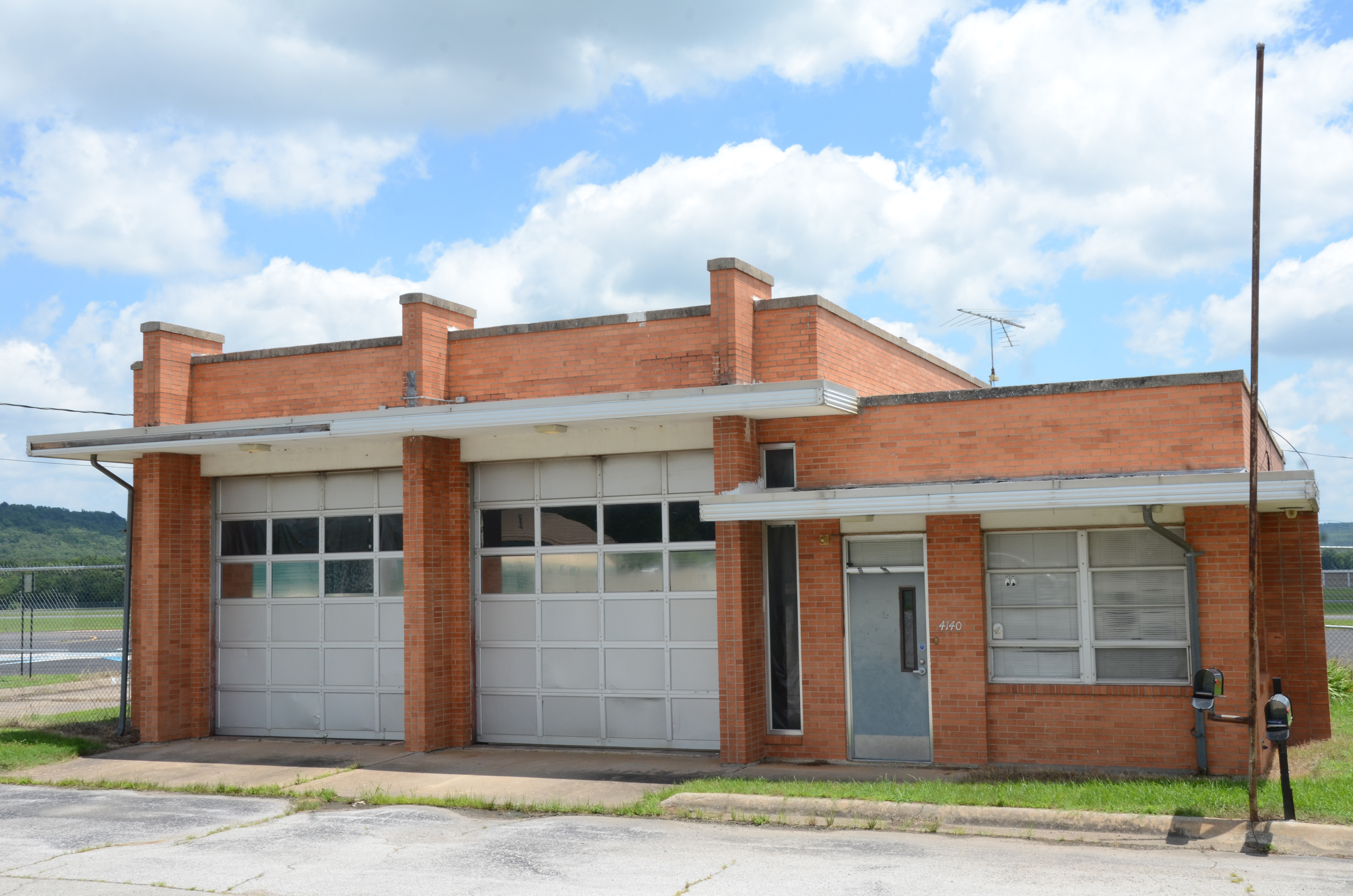
Fayetteville Fire Department Fire Station 3

- Fayetteville Fire Department Fire Station 1, Fayetteville, Arkansas, NRHP-listed
- Fayetteville Fire Department Fire Station 3, Fayetteville, Arkansas, NRHP-listed
- Old Little Rock Central Fire Station, Little Rock, Arkansas, NRHP-listed
- Old Central Fire Station (North Little Rock, Arkansas), NRHP-listed
- Park Hill Fire Station and Water Company Complex, North Little Rock, Arkansas, NRHP-listed

=== California ===
- Auburn City Hall and Fire House, Auburn, CA, NRHP-listed
- Auburn Fire House No. 1, Auburn, CA, NRHP-listed
- Auburn Fire House No. 2, Auburn, CA, NRHP-listed
- Washington Township Museum of Local History (Fremont, California), Fremont, CA, in a former fire station
- Engine Co. No. 27, now the Los Angeles Fire Department Museum and Memorial, Los Angeles, CA, NRHP-listed
- Old Plaza Firehouse, Los Angeles, CA, NRHP-contributing, home of the Plaza Firehouse Museum
- Fire Station No. 1 (Los Angeles, California), List of Los Angeles Historic-Cultural Monuments on the East and Northeast Sides
- Engine House No. 18 (Los Angeles, California), NRHP-listed
- Fire Station No. 14 (Los Angeles, California), historic all-black segregated fire station, NRHP-listed
- Fire Station No. 23 (Los Angeles, California), NRHP-listed
- Fire Station No. 30, Engine Company No. 30, historic all-black segregated fire station and engine company, NRHP-listed, home of African American Firefighter Museum
- Engine Company No. 28, Los Angeles, CA, NRHP-listed
- Nevada City Firehouse No. 1, Nevada City, CA, NRHP-listed
- Nevada City Firehouse No. 2, Nevada City, CA, NRHP-listed
- Oceanside City Hall and Fire Station, Oceanside, CA, NRHP-listed
- Arlington Branch Library and Fire Hall, Riverside, CA, NRHP-listed
- Firehouse No. 3 (Sacramento, California), NRHP-listed
- Fire Station No. 6 (Sacramento, California), NRHP-listed
- Engine House No. 31 (San Francisco, California), NRHP-listed
- San Francisco Fire Department Engine Co. Number 2, San Francisco, CA, NRHP-listed
- Santa Ana Fire Station Headquarters No. 1, Santa Ana, CA, NRHP-listed

=== Colorado ===
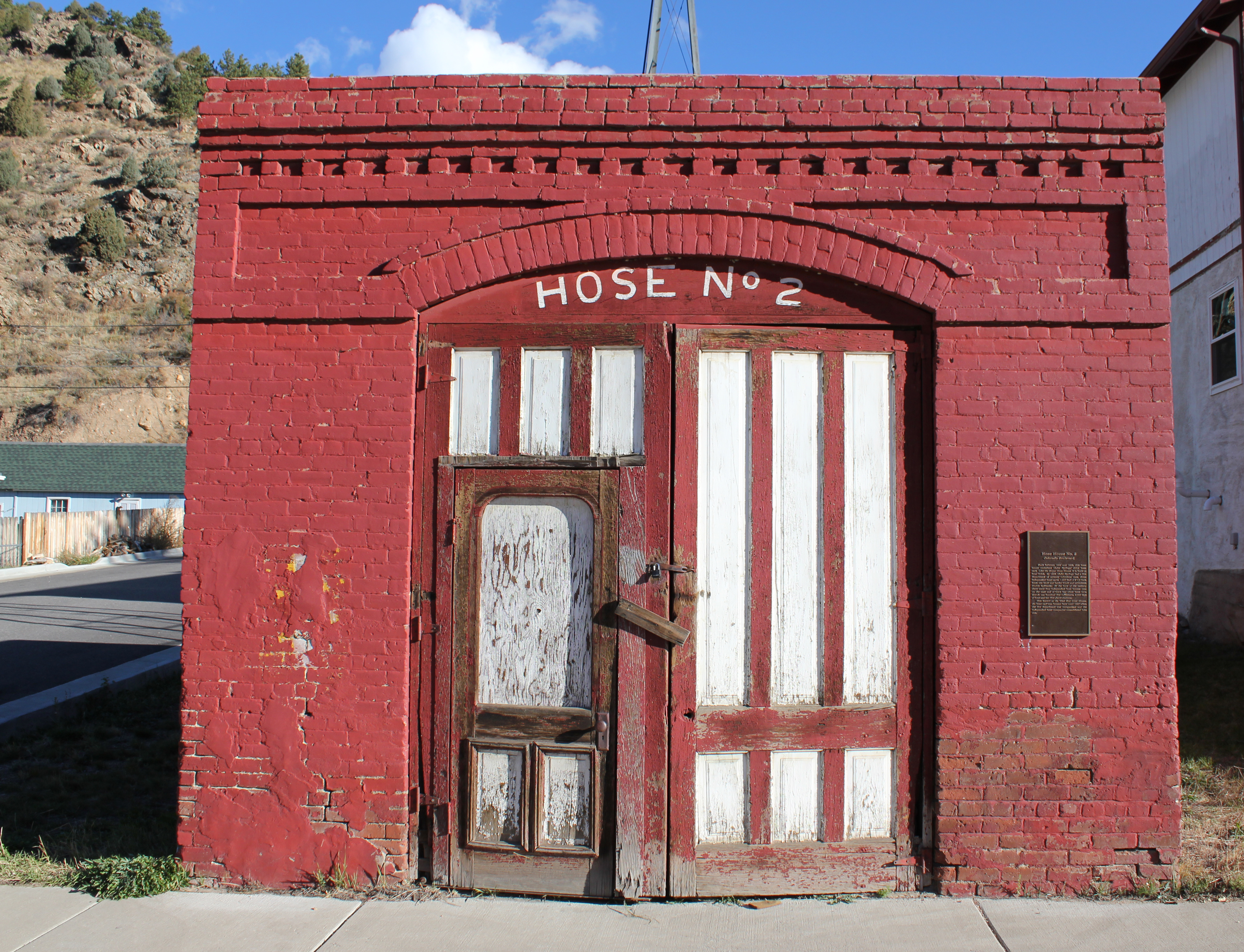
Hose House No. 2 (Idaho Springs, Colorado)

- Fire Station No. 1 (Denver, Colorado), NRHP-listed, home of the Denver Firefighters Museum and a Denver Landmark
- Fire Station No. 3 (Denver, Colorado), a Denver Landmark
- Fire Station No. 7 (Denver, Colorado), a Denver Landmark
- Fire Station No. 11 (Denver, Colorado), a Denver Landmark
- Fire Station No. 14 (Denver, Colorado), a Denver Landmark
- Fire Station No. 15 (Denver, Colorado), a Denver Landmark
- Fire Station No. 18 (Denver, Colorado), a Denver Landmark
- Alpine Hose Company No. 2, Georgetown, Colorado, NRHP-listed
- Goldfield City Hall and Fire Station, Goldfield, Colorado, NRHP-listed
- Bryan Hose House, Idaho Springs, Colorado, NRHP-listed
- Hose House No. 2 (Idaho Springs, Colorado), NRHP-listed
- Longmont Fire Department, Longmont, Colorado, NRHP-listed
- Sedalia Historic Fire House Museum, Sedalia, Colorado
- Silver Cliff Fire Station and City Hall, Silver Cliff, Colorado (see File:Original Silver Cliff Firehouse & Town Hall.JPG )

=== Connecticut ===
- Engine Company 1 Fire Station, Hartford, CT, NRHP-listed
- Engine Company 2 Fire Station, Hartford, CT, NRHP-listed
- Engine Company 6 Fire Station, Hartford, CT, NRHP-listed
- Engine Company 9 Fire Station, Hartford, CT, NRHP-listed
- Engine Company 15 Fire Station, Hartford, CT, NRHP-listed
- Engine Company 16 Fire Station, Hartford, CT, NRHP-listed
- Charter Oak Firehouse, Meriden, CT, NRHP-listed
- Hose and Hook and Ladder Truck Building, Thomaston, CT, NRHP-listed
- Torrington Fire Department Headquarters, Torrington, CT, NRHP-listed
- Tunxis Hose Firehouse, Unionville, CT, NRHP-listed
- Former Fire Station, Windsor, CT, NRHP-listed

=== Delaware ===
- Old Bridgeville Fire House, Bridgeville, DE, NRHP-listed
- Old Fire House, Milford, DE, NRHP-listed
- Aetna Hose, Hook and Ladder Company, Fire Station No. 1, Newark, DE, NRHP-listed
- Aetna Hose, Hook and Ladder Company Fire Station No. 2, Newark, DE, NRHP-listed
- Water Witch Steam Fire Engine Company No. 5, Wilmington, DE, NRHP-listed

=== Florida ===
- Boca Raton Fire Engine No. 1, Boca Raton, FL, NRHP-listed
- Coral Gables Police and Fire Station, Coral Gables, FL, NRHP-listed
- Catherine Street Fire Station, Jacksonville, FL, NRHP-listed, home of the Jacksonville Fire Museum
- Fire Station No. 2 (Miami, Florida), NRHP-listed
- Fire Station No. 4 (Miami, Florida), NRHP-listed
- Ormond Fire House, Ormond Beach, FL, NRHP-listed
- Central Station (Sebring, Florida), NRHP-listed

=== Georgia ===
- Fire Station No. 2 (1901), Athens, Georgia, a gridiron-shaped station included in the Cobbham Historic District
- Fire Station No. 6, Atlanta, Georgia, included in the Martin Luther King Jr. National Historical Park
- Fire Station No. 11 (Atlanta, Georgia), listed on the NRHP in Georgia
- Fire Station 19 (Atlanta, Georgia)
- Engine Company Number One, Augusta, NRHP-listed
- City Hall and Firehouse, Bainbridge, Georgia, included in NRHP-listed Bainbridge Commercial Historic District
- City Fire Department (Columbus, Georgia), NRHP-listed
- Mechanics Engine House No. 4, Macon, Georgia, NRHP-listed
- Statesboro City Hall and Fire Station, Statesboro, Georgia, NRHP-listed

=== Hawaii ===
- Palama Fire Station (1901), Honolulu, HI, NRHP-listed
- Kalihi Fire Station (1924), Honolulu, HI, NRHP-listed
- Waialua Fire Station (1932), Haleiwa, HI, NRHP-listed
- Waipahu Fire Station (1932), Art Deco style, adjoins historic City of Refuge Christian Church (New Waipahu Theater), 94-897 Waipahu Rd., Waipahu,
- Central Fire Station (1934), 104 S. Beretania St., Honolulu, NRHP-listed
- Makiki Fire Station, Honolulu, HI, NRHP-listed
- Kaimuki Fire Station, Honolulu, HI, NRHP-listed
- Kakaako Fire Station, Honolulu, HI, NRHP-listed
- Fire Station (Protestant Missionary Church), 1853 Beretania St., Kalaupapa, Molokai.

=== Idaho ===
- South Boise Fire Station, Boise, ID, NRHP-listed

=== Illinois ===
- Central Fire Station (Aurora, Illinois), home of the Aurora Regional Fire Museum, Aurora, Illinois
- Collinsville City Hall and Fire Station, Collinsville, Illinois, NRHP-listed
- Fire Barn 5 (Elgin, Illinois), home of the Elgin Fire Barn No. 5 Museum, NRHP-listed
- Maywood Fire Department Building, Maywood, Illinois, NRHP-listed
- Pontiac City Hall and Fire Station, Pontiac, Illinois, NRHP-listed

=== Indiana ===
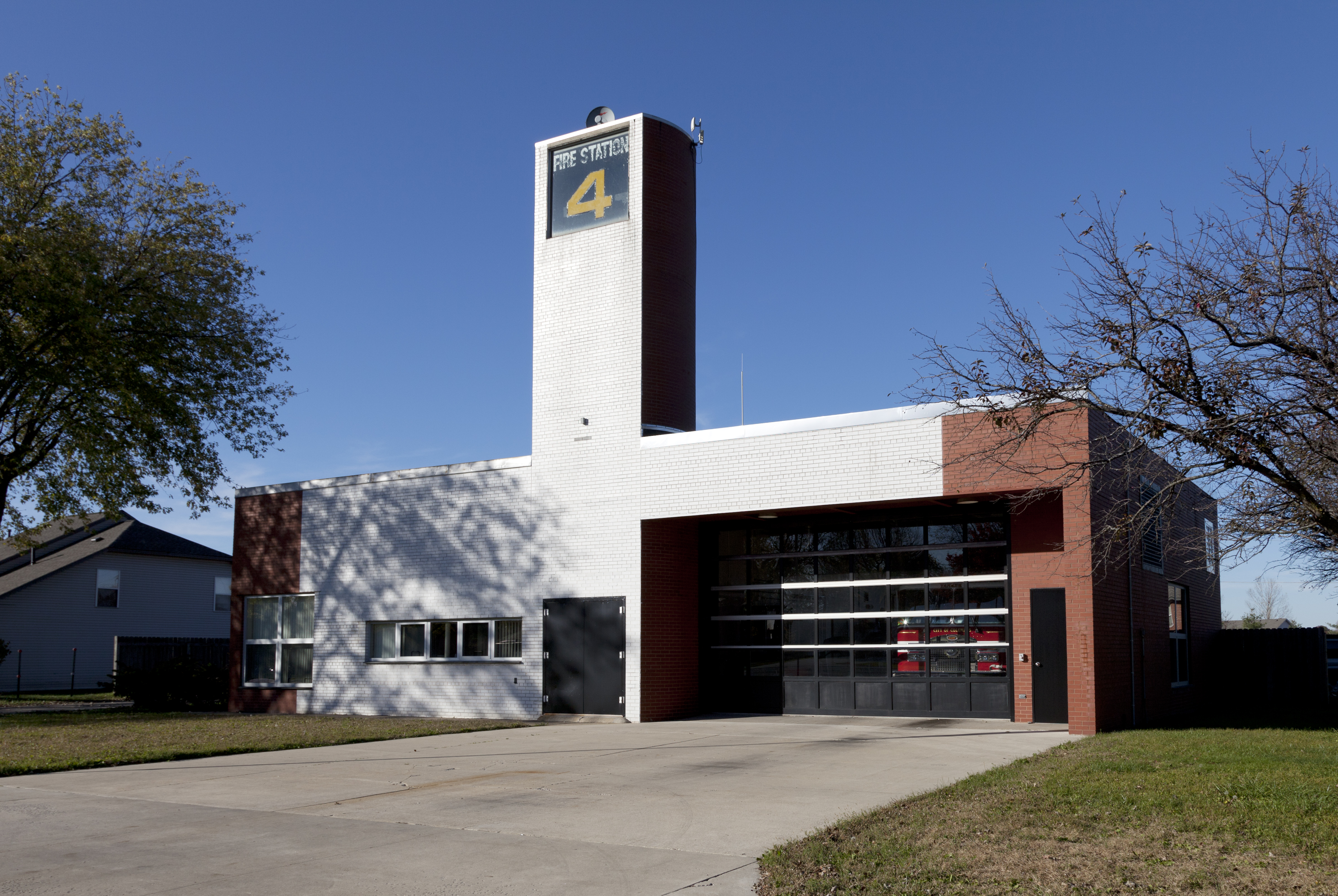
Fire Station Number 4

- Fire Station Number 4 (Columbus, Indiana), designed by Robert Venturi, 1966 in architecture
- Hose House No. 10, Evansville, IN, NRHP-listed
- Hose House No. 12, Evansville, IN, NRHP-listed
- Old Hose House No. 4, Evansville, IN, formerly NRHP-listed, demolished
- Engine House No. 3 (Fort Wayne, Indiana), NRHP-listed
- Huntingburg Town Hall and Fire Engine House, Huntingburg, IN, NRHP-listed
- Indianapolis Fire Headquarters and Municipal Garage, Indianapolis, IN, NRHP-listed
- Broad Ripple Firehouse-Indianapolis Fire Department Station 32, Indianapolis, IN, NRHP-listed
- Mishawaka Fire Station No. 4, Mishawaka, IN, NRHP-listed
- Fire Station No. 1 (Muncie, Indiana), NRHP-listed
- Plymouth Fire Station, Plymouth, IN, NRHP-listed
- Fire House No. 3, South Bend, IN, NRHP-listed
- Fire Station No. 7 (South Bend, Indiana), NRHP-listed
- Spencer Town Hall and Fire Station, Spencer, IN, NRHP-listed
- Fire Station No. 9 (Terre Haute, Indiana), NRHP-listed
- Terre Haute Fire Station No. 8, Terre Haute, IN, NRHP-listed

=== Iowa ===
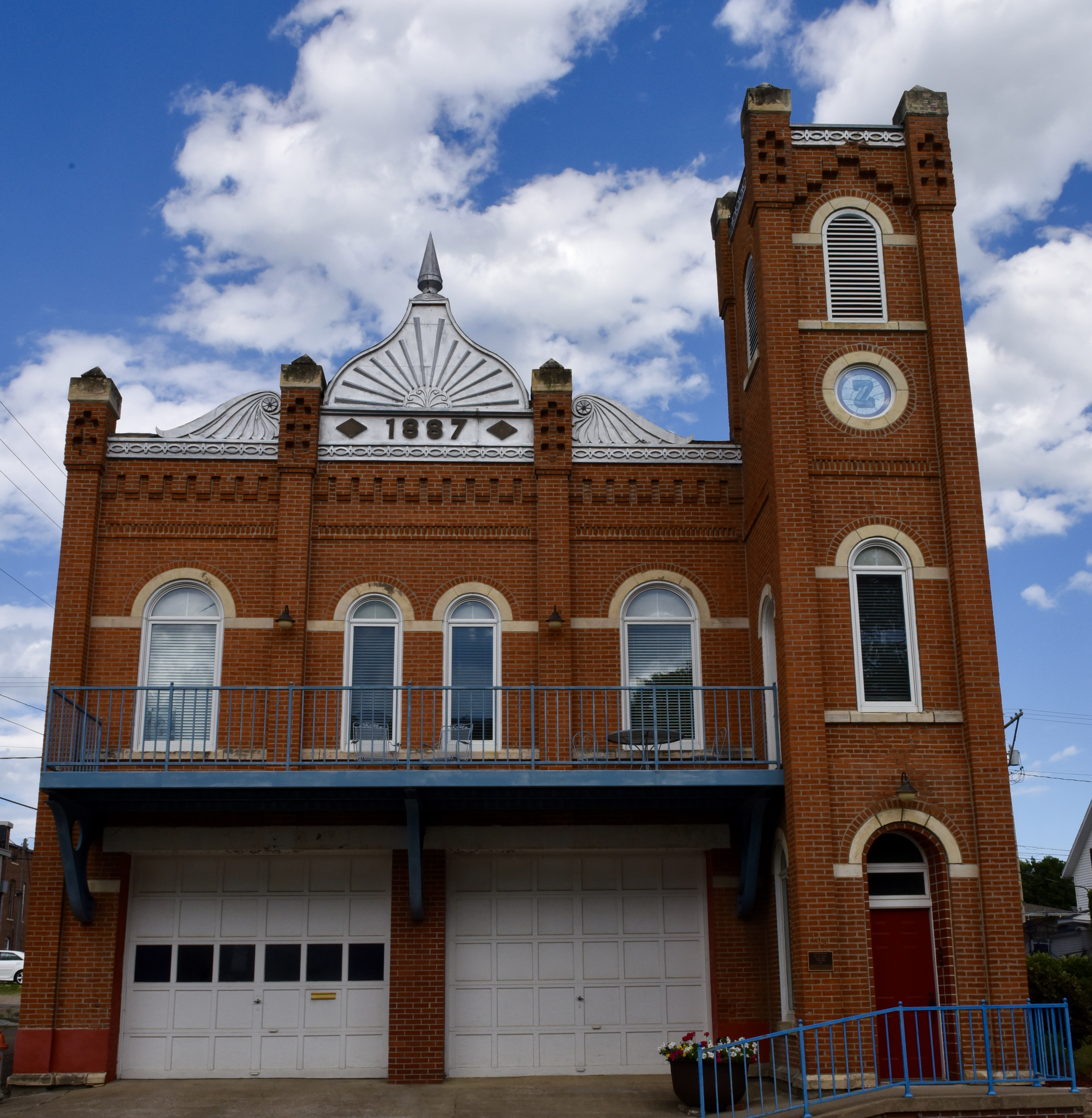
Hope Fire Company Engine House

- Municipal Building (Ames, Iowa), NRHP-listed
- Cedar Rapids Central Fire Station, Cedar Rapids, IA, NRHP-listed
- Chariton City Hall and Fire Station, Chariton, IA, NRHP-listed
- Central Fire Station (Davenport, Iowa), NRHP-listed
- Hose Station No. 1, Davenport, IA, NRHP-listed
- Davenport Hose Station No. 3, Davenport, IA, NRHP-listed
- Hose Station No. 6, Davenport, IA, NRHP-listed
- Hose Station No. 7, Davenport, IA, NRHP-listed
- Des Moines Fire Department Headquarters' Fire Station No. 1 and Shop Building, Des Moines, IA, NRHP-listed
- Fire Station No. 4 (Des Moines, Iowa), NRHP-listed
- Hose Station No. 4, Davenport, IA, contributing to NRHP-listed Village of East Davenport, home of International Fire Museum
- Hawarden City Hall, Fire Station and Auditorium, Hawarden, IA, NRHP-listed
- LaPorte City Town Hall and Fire Station, La Porte City, IA, NRHP-listed
- Oskaloosa Fire Station, Oskaloosa, IA, NRHP-listed
- Red Oak Firehouse and City Jail, Red Oak, IA, NRHP-listed
- Sioux City Fire Station Number 3, Sioux City, IA, NRHP-listed
- Hope Fire Company Engine House, Toledo, IA, NRHP-listed
- Fire Station No. 2 (Waterloo, Iowa), NRHP-listed
- Valley Junction-West Des Moines City Hall and Engine House, West Davenport, IA, NRHP-listed

=== Kansas ===
- Fire Station No. 9 (Kansas City, Kansas), NRHP-listed
- Kansas City, Kansas City Hall and Fire Headquarters, Kansas City, KS, NRHP-listed
- Fire Station No. 2 (Topeka, Kansas), NRHP-listed
- Engine House No. 6 (Wichita, Kansas), NRHP-listed

=== Kentucky ===
- Florence Fire Station, Florence, KY, NRHP-listed
- Historic Firehouses of Louisville:
  1. Fire Department Headquarters, Louisville, KY, NRHP-listed
  2. Firehouse No. 13, Louisville, KY, NRHP-listed
  3. Hook and Ladder Company No. 2, Louisville, KY, NRHP-listed
  4. Hook and Ladder Company No. 3, Louisville, KY, NRHP-listed
  5. Hook and Ladder Company No. 4, Louisville, KY, NRHP-listed
  6. Hook and Ladder Company No. 5, Louisville, KY, NRHP-listed
  7. Steam Engine Company No. 2, Louisville, KY, NRHP-listed
  8. Steam Engine Company No. 3, Louisville, KY, NRHP-listed
  9. Steam Engine Company No. 4 (Logan Street), Louisville, KY, NRHP-listed
  10. Steam Engine Company No. 4 (Main Street), Louisville, KY, NRHP-listed
  11. Steam Engine Company No. 7, Louisville, KY, NRHP-listed
  12. Steam Engine Company No. 10, Louisville, KY, NRHP-listed
  13. Steam Engine Company No. 11, Louisville, KY, NRHP-listed
  14. Steam Engine Company No. 18, Louisville, KY, NRHP-listed
  15. Steam Engine Company No. 20 (1330 Bardstown Road), Louisville, Kentucky, NRHP-listed
  16. Steam Engine Company No. 20 (1735 Bardstown Road), Louisville, Kentucky, NRHP-listed
  17. Steam Engine Company No. 21, Louisville, KY, NRHP-listed
  18. Steam Engine Company No. 22, Louisville, KY, NRHP-listed

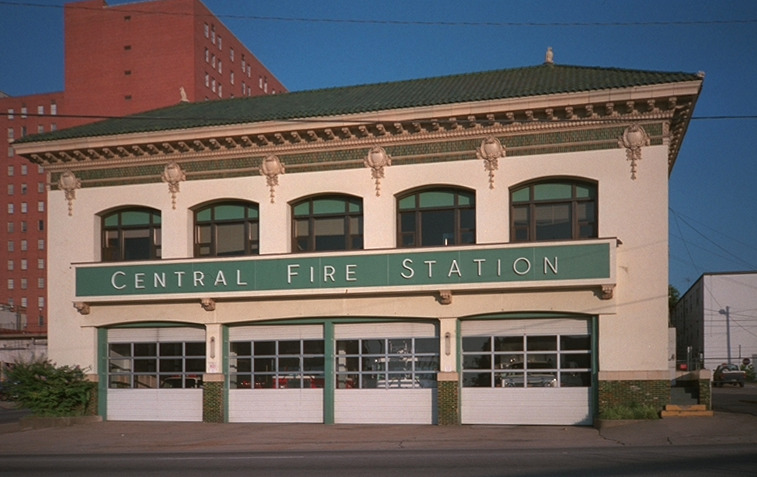
Central Fire Station (Shreveport, Louisiana)

=== Louisiana ===
- Central Fire Station (Baton Rouge, Louisiana), NRHP-listed
- David Crockett Fire Hall and Pumper, Gretna, LA, NRHP-listed
- Ruston Central Fire Station, in Ruston, Louisiana, NRHP-listed
- Central Fire Station (Shreveport, Louisiana), NRHP-listed
- South Highlands Fire Station, Shreveport, LA, NRHP-listed
- Shreveport Fire Station No. 8, Shreveport, LA, NRHP-listed

=== Maine ===
- Andover Hook and Ladder Company Building, Andover, ME, NRHP-listed
- Engine House (Auburn, Maine), NRHP-listed
- Bangor Fire Engine House No. 6, Bangor, ME, NRHP-listed
- Bangor Hose House No. 5, Bangor, ME, NRHP-listed, now the Hose 5 Fire Museum
- Monson Engine House, Monson, ME, NRHP-listed, now the Monson Historical Society Museum
- Old Fire Engine House, Orono, ME, NRHP-listed
- Engine Company Number Nine Firehouse, Portland, ME, NRHP-listed
- Portland Fire Museum, Portland, Maine, in the former home of Fire Engine 4
- Saco Central Fire Station, Saco, ME, NRHP-listed
- Skowhegan Fire Station, Skowhegan, ME, NRHP-listed

=== Maryland ===
- Old City Hall and Engine House, Annapolis, Maryland, NRHP-listed
- Engine House No. 6 (Baltimore, Maryland), NRHP-listed
- Engine House No. 8 (Baltimore, Maryland), NRHP-listed, now partly restored at Fire Museum of Maryland, Lutherville, MD
- Paca Street Firehouse, Baltimore, MD, NRHP-listed
- Poppleton Fire Station, Baltimore, MD, NRHP-listed
- Canada Hose Company Building, Cumberland, MD, NRHP-listed

=== Massachusetts ===
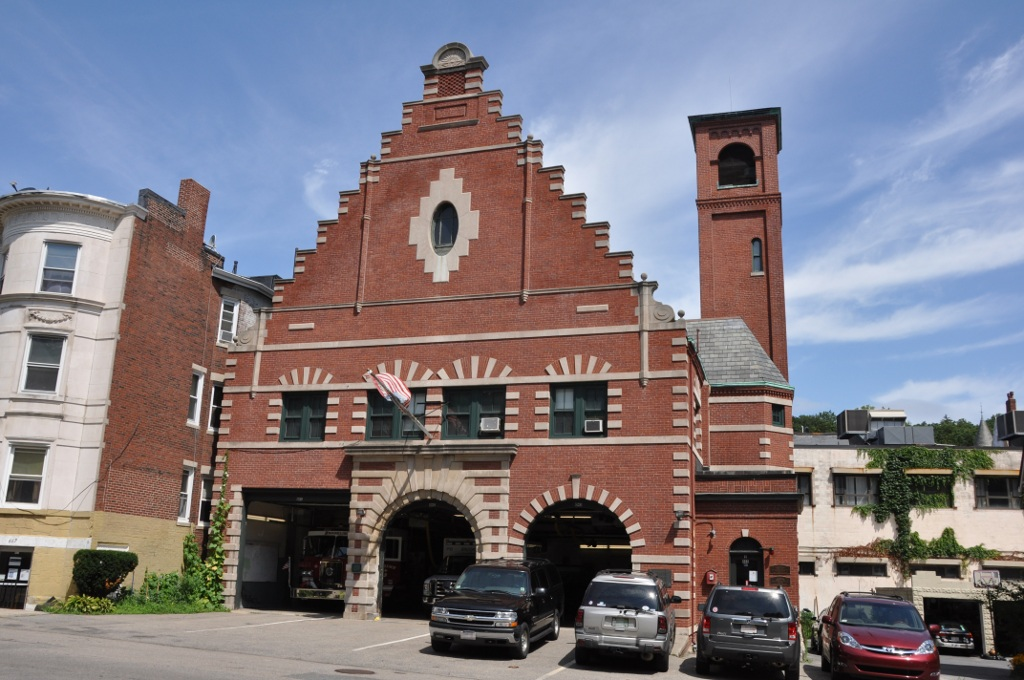
Fire Station No. 7 (Brookline, Massachusetts) (1898), with stepped gable and a rear hose tower

- Park Street Firehouse, Adams, MA, NRHP-listed
- Highland Hose House, Arlington, MA, NRHP-listed
- Falls Fire Station No. 2, Attleborough Falls/North Attleborough, MA, NRHP-listed, home of Falls Fire Barn Museum
- Hose House No. 2 (Beverly, Massachusetts), NRHP-listed
- 941–955 Boylston Street, Boston, MA, in the Back Bay
- Congress Street Fire Station, Boston, MA, NRHP-listed, home of the Boston Fire Museum
- Engine House No. 34 (Boston, Massachusetts), NRHP-listed
- Harvard Avenue Fire Station, Boston, MA, NRHP-listed
- Central Fire Station (Brockton, Massachusetts), NRHP-listed
- Fire Station No. 7 (Brookline, Massachusetts) (1898), NRHP-listed
- Kendall Hotel (1895), Cambridge, MA, in 1895 firehouse, one of the Historic Hotels of America
- River Street Firehouse, Cambridge, MA, NRHP-listed
- Taylor Square Firehouse, Cambridge, MA, NRHP-listed
- Central Fire Station (Falmouth, Massachusetts), NRHP-listed
- Cataract Engine Company No. 3, Fall River, MA, NRHP-listed
- Massasoit Fire House No. 5, Fall River, MA, NRHP-listed
- Pocasset Firehouse No. 7, Fall River, MA, NRHP-listed
- Elm Street Fire Station, Gardner, MA, NRHP-listed
- Lake Street Fire Station, Gardner, MA, NRHP-listed
- Engine House No. 6 (Lawrence, Massachusetts), NRHP-listed
- Engine No. 2, Marblehead, MA (File:Marblehead Massachusetts firehouse Engine No 2.JPG)
- Hydrant No. 3 House, Metcalf Village, Holliston, Massachusetts, NRHP-listed
- Fire Station No. 4 (New Bedford, Massachusetts), NRHP-listed, home of New Bedford Fire Museum
- Peabody Central Fire Station, Peabody, MA, NRHP-listed
- Old Central Fire Station (Pittsfield, Massachusetts), NRHP-listed
- Central Fire Station (Quincy, Massachusetts), NRHP-listed
- Quincy Point Fire Station, Quincy, MA, NRHP-listed
- Wollaston Fire Station, Quincy, MA, NRHP-listed
- Old Hose House, Reading, MA, NRHP-listed
- North Street Fire Station, Salem, MA, NRHP-listed
- South Lancaster Engine House, South Lancaster, MA, NRHP-listed
- Elm Street Fire House, Southbridge, MA, NRHP-listed
- Globe Village Fire House, Southbridge, MA, NRHP-listed
- Stoneham Firestation, Stoneham, MA, NRHP-listed
- Central Fire Station (Taunton, Massachusetts), NRHP-listed
- East Taunton Fire Station, Taunton, MA, NRHP-listed
- Kilmer Street Fire Station, Taunton, MA, NRHP-listed
- Whittenton Fire and Police Station, Taunton, MA, NRHP-listed
- Weir Engine House, Taunton, MA, NRHP-listed
- Moody Street Fire Station, Waltham, MA, NRHP-listed
- Beacon Street Firehouse, Worcester, MA, NRHP-listed
- Bloomingdale Firehouse, Worcester, MA, NRHP-listed
- Cambridge Street Firehouse, Worcester, MA, NRHP-listed
- Pleasant Street Firehouse, Worcester, MA, NRHP-listed
- Providence Street Firehouse, Worcester, MA, NRHP-listed
- Quinsigamond Firehouse, Worcester, MA, NRHP-listed
- Webster Street Firehouse, Worcester, MA, NRHP-listed
- Woodland Street Firehouse, Worcester, MA, NRHP-listed

=== Michigan ===
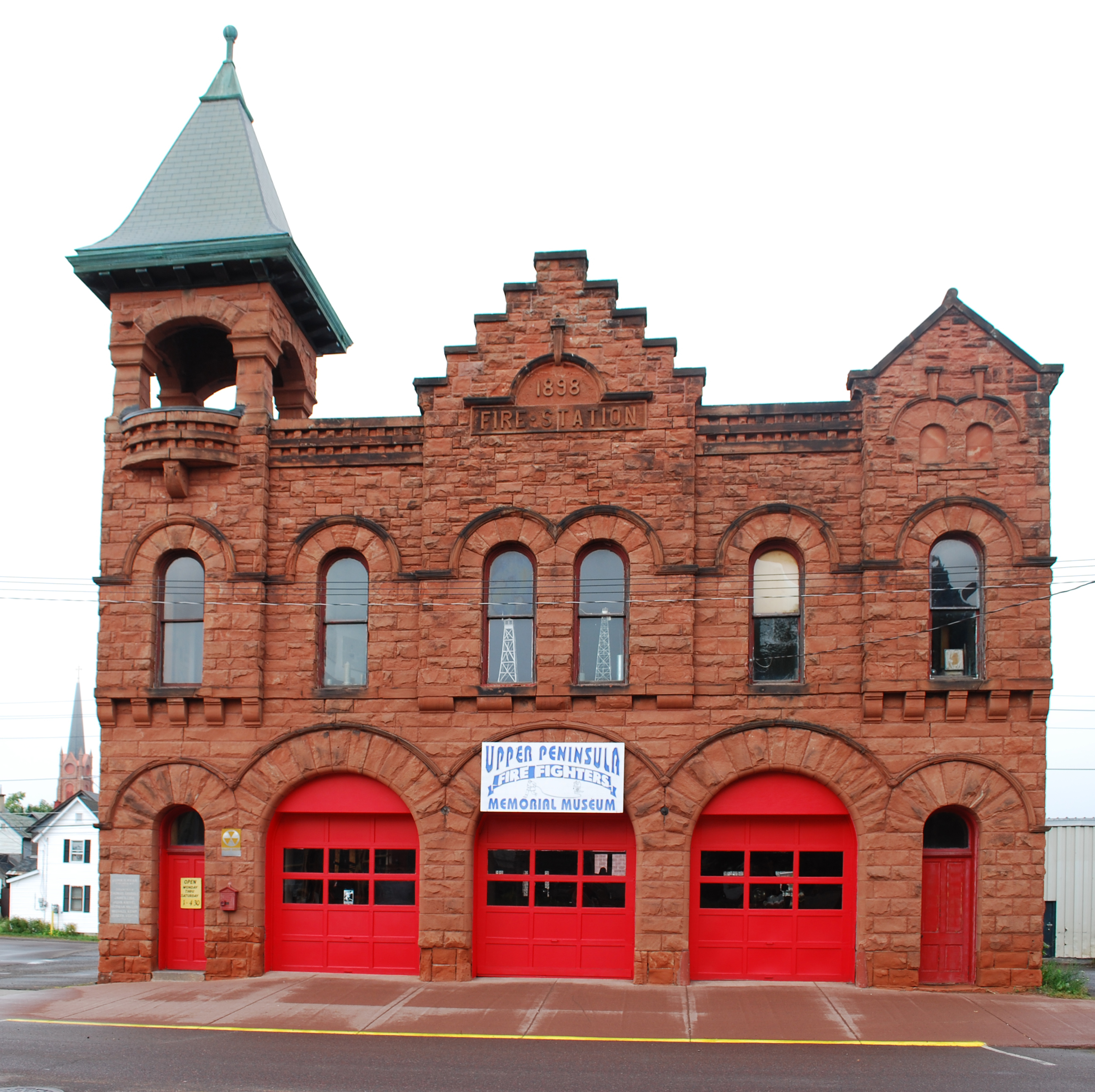
Calumet Fire Station

- Adrian Engine House No. 1, Adrian, Michigan, NRHP-listed
- Ann Arbor Central Fire Station, Ann Arbor, Michigan, NRHP-listed
- Calumet Fire Station (1899), Calumet, Michigan, NRHP-listed, home of the Upper Peninsula Fire Fighters Memorial Museum
- Engine House No. 11 (Detroit), NRHP-listed
- Engine House No. 18 (Detroit), NRHP-listed
- Hook and Ladder House No. 5-Detroit Fire Department Repair Shop, Detroit, Michigan, NRHP-listed
- Hancock Town Hall and Fire Hall, Hancock, Michigan, NRHP-listed
- Holland Old City Hall and Fire Station, Holland, Michigan, NRHP-listed
- Houghton Fire Hall, Houghton, Michigan, included in NRHP-listed Shelden Avenue Historic District
- Portage Street Fire Station, Kalamazoo, Michigan, NRHP-listed
- Old Fire House No. 4 (Kalamazoo, Michigan), NRHP-listed
- Engine House No. 3 (Kalamazoo, Michigan), NRHP-listed
- Lake Linden Village Hall and Fire Station, Lake Linden, MI, NRHP-listed
- Central Fire Station (Muskegon, Michigan), NRHP-listed
- Negaunee Fire Station, Negaunee, Michigan, NRHP-listed

=== Minnesota ===
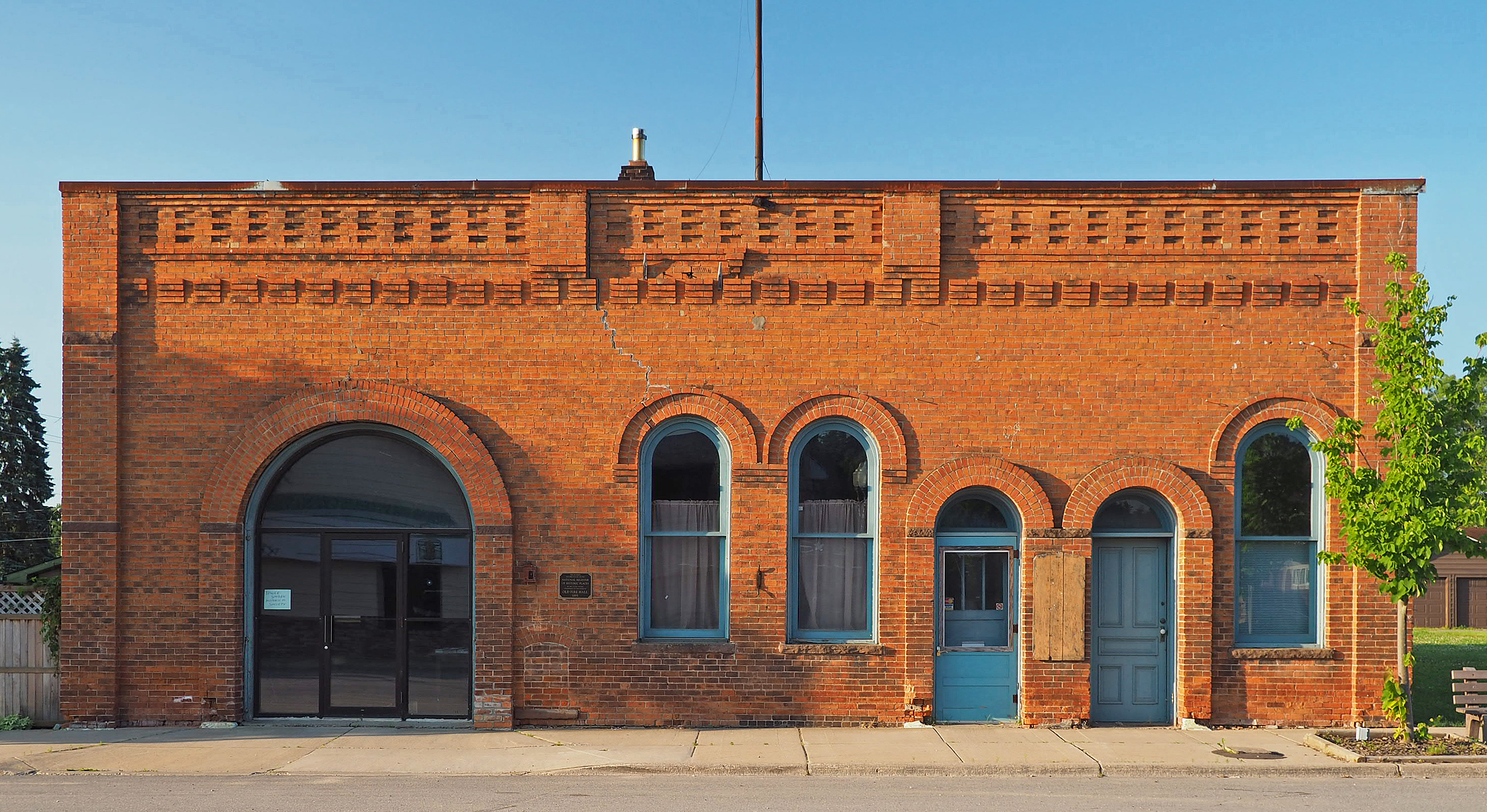
Tower Fire Hall, which never had any tower.

- Brandon Auditorium and Fire Hall, Brandon, MN, NRHP-listed
- Firemen's Hall (Cannon Falls, Minnesota), NRHP-listed in Goodhue County, Minnesota
- Fire Station No. 1 (Duluth, Minnesota), NRHP-listed
- Minneapolis Fire Department Repair Shop, Minneapolis, MN, NRHP-listed
- Station 13 Minneapolis Fire Department, Minneapolis, MN, NRHP-listed
- Station 28 Minneapolis Fire Department, Minneapolis, MN, NRHP-listed
- Fire Station No. 19 (Minneapolis, Minnesota), NRHP-listed
- Owatonna City and Firemen's Hall, Owatonna, MN, NRHP-listed
- Perham Village Hall and Fire Station, Perham, MN, NRHP-listed
- Pine Island City Hall and Fire Station, Pine Island, MN, NRHP-listed
- Revere Fire Hall, Revere, MN, NRHP-listed
- Tenney Fire Hall, Tenney, MN, NRHP-listed
- Tower Fire Hall, Tower, MN, NRHP-listed
- Wadena Fire and City Hall, Wadena, MN, NRHP-listed

=== Mississippi ===
- Pascagoula Central Fire Station No. 1, Pascagoula, MS, NRHP-listed
- Central Fire Station (Jackson, Mississippi), listed on the NRHP in Mississippi

=== Missouri ===
- Old California City Hall and Fire Station, California, MO, NRHP-listed
- Fire Department Headquarters; Fire Station No. 2, Kansas City, MO, NRHP-listed
- Pierce City Fire Station, Courthouse and Jail, Pierce City, MO, NRHP-listed
- City Hose Company No. 9, St. Joseph, MO, NRHP-listed

=== Montana ===
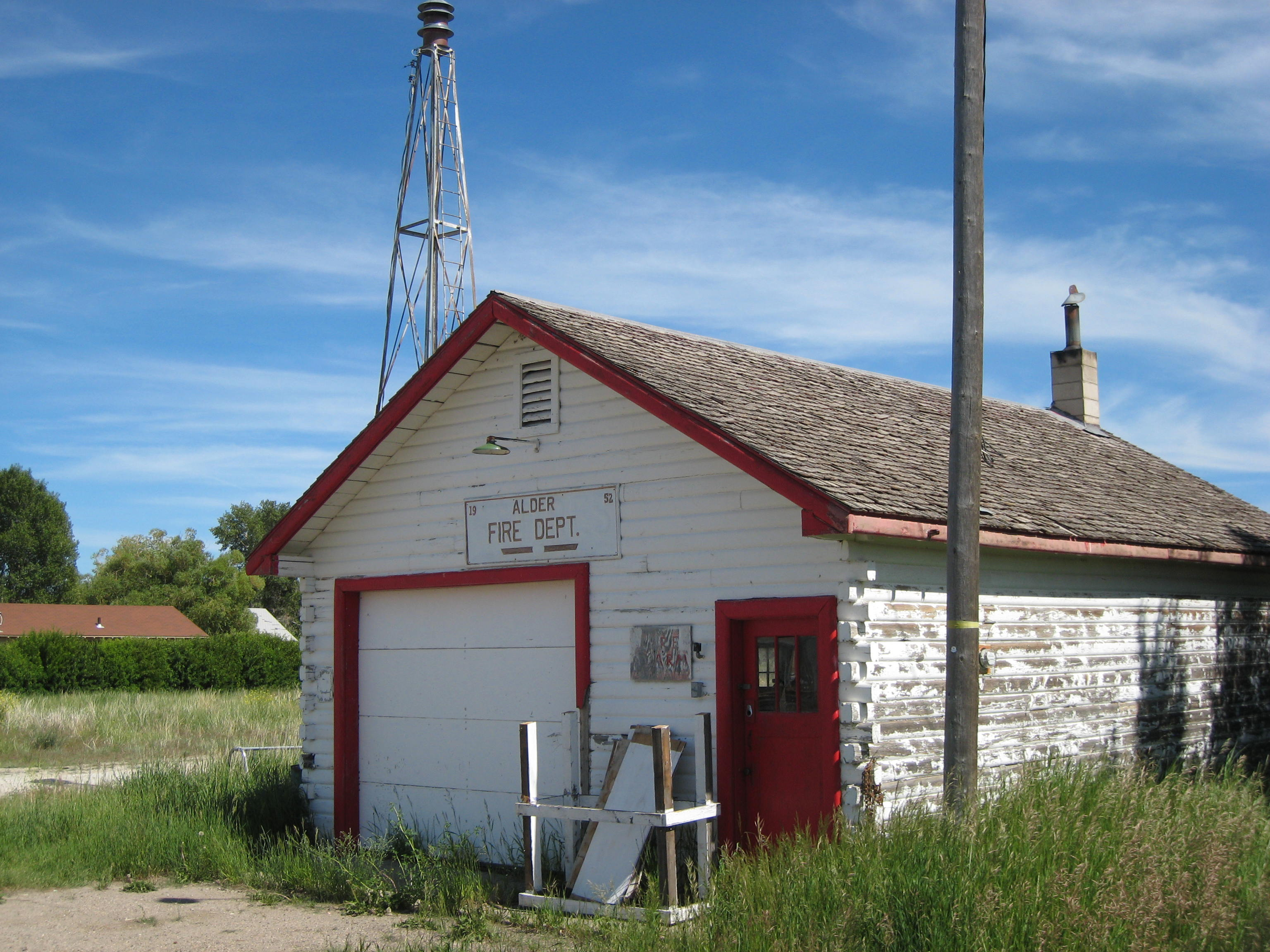
Fire department building in Alder, Montana

- Anaconda City Hall (1895), Anaconda, MT, NRHP-listed
- Big Timber Town Hall, Big Timber, MT, NRHP-listed, also known as "Big Timber Fire Hall"
- Fire House No. 2 (Billings, Montana), NRHP-listed
- Garage and Fire Station (Fort Peck, Montana), NRHP-listed
- Fire Hall (Joliet, Montana), NRHP-listed
- Fort Benton Engine House, Fort Benton, MT, NRHP-listed

=== Nebraska ===
- Benson City Hall (Omaha, Nebraska)
- Florence Firehouse
- Humphrey City Hall (1902), Humphrey, Nebraska
- Sioux Ordnance Depot Fire & Guard Headquarters (1942), Sidney, Nebraska, NRHP-listed

=== Nevada ===
- Tonopah Volunteer Firehouse and Gymnasium, Tonopah, NV, NRHP-listed

=== New Jersey ===
- Bayonne Truck House No. 1, Bayonne, NJ, NRHP-listed, now the Chief John T. Brennan Fire Museum
- Assembly of Exempt Firemen Building, Hoboken, NJ, NRHP-listed, now the Hoboken Fire Department Museum
- Engine Company No. 2, Hoboken, NJ, NRHP-listed
- Engine Company No. 3, Hoboken, NJ, NRHP-listed
- Engine Company No. 4, Hoboken, NJ, NRHP-listed
- Engine Company No. 5, Hoboken, NJ, NRHP-listed
- Engine Company No. 6, Hoboken, NJ, NRHP-listed
- Engine House No. 3, Truck No. 2 (Hoboken, New Jersey), NRHP-listed
- Highland Hose No. 4, Kearny, NJ, NRHP-listed
- Cliffside Hose Company No. 4, Montclair, NJ, NRHP-listed
- Plainfield Central Fire Headquarters, Plainfield, NJ, NRHP-listed
- Firehouse No. 4 (Plainfield, New Jersey), NRHP-listed
- Relief Home Company No. 2 Engine House, Raritan Borough, NJ, NRHP-listed
- West End Hose Company Number 3, Somerville, NJ, NRHP-listed, home of Somerville Fire Department Museum
- South Orange Fire Department, South Orange Village, NJ, NRHP-listed
- Excelsior Engine Co. No. 2 Firehouse – Exempt Firemen Association Headquarters, West New York, NJ, NRHP-listed
- Westfield Fire Headquarters, Westfield, NJ, NRHP-listed

=== New Hampshire ===
- Boscawen Academy and Much-I-Do-Hose House, Boscawen, NH, NRHP-listed

=== New Mexico ===
- Monte Vista Fire Station, Albuquerque, NM, NRHP-listed
- Santa Fe Railway Shops fire station, of the Santa Fe Railway Shops (Albuquerque), NM, NRHP-listed, oldest fire station in Albuquerque
- 1908 Clovis City Hall and Fire Station, Clovis, NM, NRHP-listed
- Clovis Central Fire Station, Clovis, NM, NRHP-listed
- Lovington Fire Department Building, Lovington, NM, NRHP-listed

=== New York ===
- Alfred Dolge Hose Co. No. 1 Building, Dolgeville, NY, NRHP-listed
- Bay Shore Hose Company No. 1 Firehouse, Bay Shore, New York, NRHP-listed
- Beacon Engine Company No. 1 Firehouse, Beacon, NY, NRHP-listed
- Central Fire Station (Schenectady, New York), listed on the NRHP in New York
- Cold Spring Harbor Fire District Hook and Ladder Company Building, Cold Spring Harbor, NY, NRHP-listed
- Coney Island Fire Station Pumping Station, New York, NY, NRHP-listed
- Cortland Fire Headquarters, Cortland, NY, NRHP-listed
- Engine House No. 28 (Buffalo, New York), NRHP-listed
- Esek Bussey Firehouse, Troy, NY, NRHP-listed
- Firehouse, Hook & Ladder Company 8, New York, NY, exterior famously used for the movie Ghostbusters
- Fire Hook and Ladder Company No. 14, New York, NY, NRHP-listed
- Firehouse, Engine Company 31, New York, NY, NRHP-listed
- Firehouse, Engine Company 33, New York, NY, NRHP-listed
- Fireman's Hall (Alfred, New York), NRHP-listed
- Firemen's Hall (College Point, New York), NRHP-listed in Queens County
- Fire Station No. 4 (Elmira, New York), listed on NRHP in New York
- Firthcliffe Firehouse, Cornwall, NY, NRHP-listed
- Hook and Ladder No. 4, Albany, NY, NRHP-listed
- Hyde Park Firehouse, Hyde Park, NY, NRHP-listed
- J.C. Osgood Firehouse, Troy, NY, NRHP-listed
- Lady Washington Hose Company, Poughkeepsie, NY, NRHP-listed
- Morgan Hook and Ladder Company, Naples, NY, NRHP-listed
- New York City Fire Museum, in FDNY Engine Company No. 30 (1904), Manhattan, New York City
- Niagara Engine House, Poughkeepsie, New York, NRHP-listed
- O. H. Booth Hose Company, Poughkeepsie, NY, NRHP-listed
- Old Brooklyn Fire Headquarters, New York, NY, NRHP-listed
- Port Henry Fire Department Building, Port Henry, NY, NRHP-listed
- Putnam and Mellor Engine and Hose Company Firehouse, Port Chester, NY, NRHP-listed
- Rescue Hook & Ladder Company No. 1 Firehouse, Roslyn, NY, NRHP-listed
- Rochester Fire Department Headquarters and Shops, Rochester, NY, NRHP-listed
- Sea Cliff Firehouse, Sea Cliff, NY, NRHP-listed
- Upper Nyack Firehouse, Upper Nyack, NY, NRHP-listed
- Watts De Peyster Fireman's Hall, Tivoli, NY, NRHP-listed
- West Endicott Hose Company No. 1, West Endicott, NY, NRHP-listed
- Wiley Hose Company Building, Catskill, NY, NRHP-listed

=== North Carolina ===
- Fire Station Number 4 (Asheville, North Carolina), NRHP-listed
- Fire Station No. 2 (Charlotte, North Carolina), NRHP-listed
- Central Fire Station (Greensboro, North Carolina), NRHP-listed
- Henderson Fire Station and Municipal Building, Henderson, NC, NRHP-listed
- Kinston Fire Station-City Hall, Kinston, NC, NRHP-listed

=== North Dakota ===
- Hook and Ladder No. 1 and Hose Co. No. 2, Grand Forks, ND, NRHP-listed
- Fire Hall (Bismarck, North Dakota), formerly NRHP-listed

=== Ohio ===
- Anna Town Hall, Anna, OH, NRHP-listed
- Cedarville Opera House, Cedarville, OH, NRHP-listed
- Court Street Firehouse, Cincinnati, OH, NRHP-listed, now the Fire Museum of Greater Cincinnati
- East Walnut Hills Firehouse, Cincinnati, OH, NRHP-listed
- Engine House No. 1 (Sandusky, Ohio), NRHP-listed
- Engine House No. 3 (Sandusky, Ohio), NRHP-listed
- Dayton Fire Station No. 14, Dayton, OH, NRHP-listed
- Dayton Fire Department Station No. 16, Dayton, OH, NRHP-listed
- East Side Fire Station, Defiance, OH, NRHP-listed
- Glenford Bank, Glenford, Ohio, NRHP-listed
- Jamestown Opera House, Jamestown, Ohio, NRHP-listed
- Leipsic Village Hall, Leipsic, Ohio, NRHP-listed, destroyed.
- Lorain Fire Station No. 1, Lorain, OH, NRHP-listed
- Levering Hall, Mount Gilead, OH, NRHP-listed
- No. 5 Fire Station (Sandusky, Ohio), NRHP-listed
- Northmoor Engine House, Columbus, Ohio
- Portsmouth Fire Department No. 1, Portsmouth, OH, NRHP-listed
- Waynesville Engine House and Lockup, Waynesville, OH, NRHP-listed

=== Oklahoma ===
- Campus Fire Station, Stillwater, OK, NRHP-listed

=== Oregon ===
- Astoria Fire House No. 2, Astoria, OR, NRHP-listed, now the Uppertown Firefighter's Museum
- Grants Pass City Hall and Fire Station, Grants Pass, OR, NRHP-listed
- Interstate Firehouse Cultural Center (1910), North Portland, OR
- Portland Fire Station No. 7 (1927), Portland, OR, NRHP-listed
- Portland Fire Station No. 17, Portland, OR, NRHP-listed
- Portland Fire Station No. 23, Portland, OR, NRHP-listed
- St. Johns City Hall, St. Johns, Portland, OR
- Woodstock Fire Station, Woodstock, Portland, OR, now the Woodstock Community Center

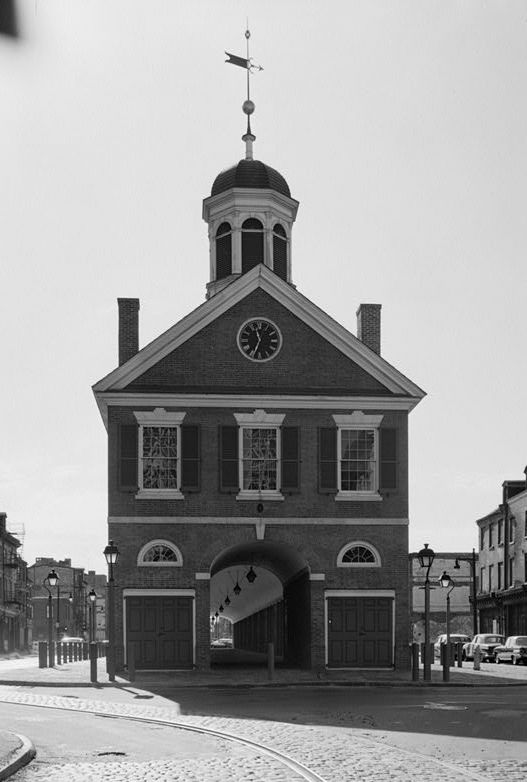
Hope Hose Co. No. 6 and Fellowship Engine Co. No. 29

=== Pennsylvania ===
- Washington Hose and Steam Fire Engine Company, No. 1, Conshohocken, PA, NRHP-listed
- Camp Curtin Fire Station, Harrisburg, PA, NRHP-listed
- Pennsylvania National Fire Museum, Harrisburg, PA, in the 1899 fire station building of Reily Hose Company No. 10
- Franklin Hose Company No. 28, Philadelphia, PA, NRHP-listed
- Hope Hose Co. No. 6 and Fellowship Engine Co. No. 29, Philadelphia, PA, HABS-documented
- Engine Company No. 1 and No. 30, Pittsburgh, PA
- Hampden Firehouse, Reading, PA, NRHP-listed
- Keystone Hook and Ladder Company, Reading, PA, NRHP-listed
- Liberty Fire Company No. 5, Reading, PA, NRHP-listed, home of the Reading Area Fire-Fighters Museum
- Municipal Building and Central Fire Station, 340, Scranton, PA, NRHP-listed
- Laurel-Rex Fire Company House, York, PA, NRHP-listed

=== Rhode Island ===
- Fire Station No. 4 (Pawtucket, Rhode Island), NRHP-listed

=== South Carolina ===
- North Columbia Fire Station No. 7, Columbia, SC, NRHP-listed
- Columbia Central Fire Station, Columbia, SC, NRHP-listed

=== South Dakota ===
- Delmont Pumphouse, Delmont, South Dakota, NRHP-listed
- Redfield Light Plant and Fire Station, Redfield, SD, NRHP-listed
- Central Fire Station (Sioux Falls, South Dakota), listed on the NRHP in South Dakota
- South Side Fire Station No. 3, Sioux Falls, SD, NRHP-listed
- Utica Fire and City Hall, Utica, SD, NRHP-listed

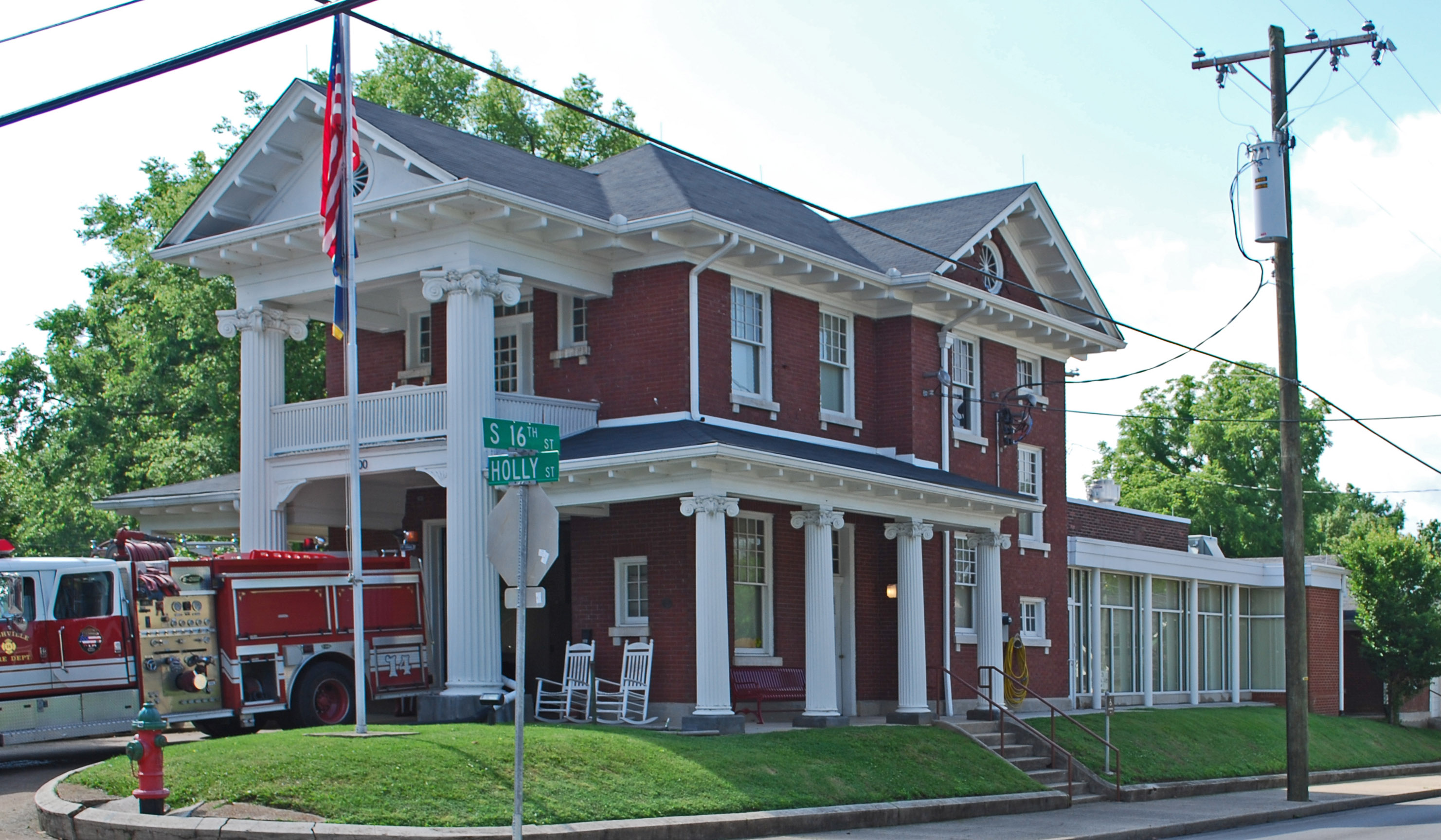
Residential-style Holly Street Fire Hall

=== Tennessee ===
- Fire Engine House No. 1 (Memphis, Tennessee), home of the Fire Museum of Memphis
- James Geddes Engine Company No. 6, Nashville, TN, NRHP-listed
- Molyneux Chevrolet Company-Rockwood Fire Department Building, Rockwood, TN, NRHP-listed
- Fire Hall No. 1, Nashville, TN, NRHP-listed
- Holly Street Fire Hall, Nashville, TN, NRHP-listed
- Fire Station No. 5 (Knoxville, Tennessee), listed on the NRHP in Tennessee

=== Texas ===
- Abilene Fire Station No. 2, Abilene, TX, NRHP-listed
- Austin Central Fire Station 1, Austin, TX, NRHP-listed
- Fire Museum of Texas, Beaumont, Texas, a Recorded Texas Landmark
- Dallas Fire Station No. 16, Dallas, TX, NRHP-listed
- Number 4 Hook and Ladder Company, Dallas, TX, NRHP-listed
- Fire Engine House No. 9, Houston, TX, NRHP-listed
- Houston Fire Station No. 7, Houston, TX, NRHP-listed, home of Houston Fire Museum
- Houston Heights Fire Station, Houston, TX, NRHP-listed
- Central Fire Station (Pampa, Texas), NRHP-listed
- Fire Station and City Hall, San Marcos, TX, NRHP-listed

=== Utah ===
- Brigham City Fire Station/City Hall (1909), Brigham City, Utah, NRHP-listed
- Firestation No. 8 (Salt Lake City, Utah), NRHP-listed
- Spanish Fork Fire Station, Spanish Fork, Utah, former building, which formerly was NRHP-listed

=== Vermont ===
- W.H. Bradford Hook and Ladder Fire House, Bennington, Vermont, NRHP-listed
- Ethan Allen Engine Company No. 4, Burlington, Vermont, NRHP-listed

=== Virginia ===
- Cherrydale Volunteer Fire House, also known as Fire Station No. 3, Arlington, Virginia, NRHP-listed
- Chincoteague Fire Department, Chincoteague
- Fire Station No. 1, Roanoke, NRHP-listed
- Fire Station No. 5, Roanoke, NRHP-listed
- Roanoke City Firehouse No. 6, Roanoke, NRHP-listed
- Steamer Company Number 5, Richmond, NRHP-listed

=== Washington ===
- Everett Fire Station No. 2, Everett, WA, NRHP-listed
- Fire Station No. 18 (Seattle, Washington), NRHP-listed
- Fire Station No. 23 (Seattle, Washington), NRHP-listed
- Fire Station No. 25 (Seattle, Washington), NRHP-listed
- Wallingford Fire and Police Station, Seattle, WA, NRHP-listed
- Spokane Fire Station No. 3, Spokane, WA, NRHP-listed
- Fireboat Station (1928), Tacoma, Washington, NRHP-listed. Station for three fireboats.
- Fire Station No. 1 (Tacoma, Washington), NRHP-listed
- Fire Station No. 2 (Tacoma, Washington), NRHP-listed
- Engine House No. 4 (Tacoma, Washington), NRHP-listed
- Fire Station No. 5 (Tacoma, Washington), NRHP-listed
- Engine House No. 8 (Tacoma, Washington), NRHP-listed
- Engine House No. 9 (Tacoma, Washington), NRHP-listed
- Fire Station No. 10 (Tacoma, Washington), NRHP-listed
- Engine House No. 11 (Tacoma, Washington), NRHP-listed
- Engine House No. 13 (Tacoma, Washington), NRHP-listed
- Fire Station No. 14 (Tacoma, Washington), NRHP-listed
- Fire Station No. 15 (Tacoma, Washington), NRHP-listed
- Wenatchee Fire Station No. 1, Wenatchee, WA, NRHP-listed

=== West Virginia ===
- Warwood Fire Station, Wheeling, WV, NRHP-listed

=== Wisconsin ===
- Aetna Station No. 5, Fond du Lac, WI, NRHP-listed
- Green Lake Village Hall, Green Lake, WI, NRHP-listed
- Fire and police station, and iconic Hose Tower, in Greendale Historic District, a U.S. National Historic Landmark district
- Jefferson Fire Station, Jefferson, WI, NRHP-listed
- Fire Station No. 4 (Madison, Wisconsin), NRHP-listed
- Mequon Town Hall and Fire Station Complex, Mequon, WI, NRHP-listed
- Chief Lippert Fire Station, Milwaukee, WI, NRHP-listed
- Omro Village Hall and Engine House, Omro, WI, NRHP-listed
- Brooklyn No. 4 Fire House, Oshkosh, WI, NRHP-listed
- Port Washington Fire Engine House, Port Washington, WI, NRHP-listed
- Sauk City Fire Station, Sauk City, WI, NRHP-listed
- Tigerton Village Hall and Engine House, Tigerton, WI, NRHP-listed

=== Wyoming ===
- Casper Fire Department Station No. 1, Casper, WY, NRHP-listed

=== Washington, D.C. ===
- Old Engine Company No. 6, Washington, DC, NRHP-listed
- Engine House No. 10 (Washington, D.C.), NRHP-listed
- Engine Company 12, Washington, DC, NRHP-listed
- Engine Company 16-Truck Company 3, Washington, DC, NRHP-listed
- Engine Company 17, Washington, DC, NRHP-listed
- Engine Company 19 (Washington, D.C.), Washington, D.C., NRHP-listed
- Engine Company 21, Washington, DC, NRHP-listed
- Engine Company 22, Washington, DC, NRHP-listed
- Engine Company 23, Washington, DC, NRHP-listed
- Engine Company 25 (Washington, D.C.), NRHP-listed
- Engine Company 26 (Washington, D.C.), NRHP-listed
- Old Engine Company 26 (Washington, D.C.), NRHP-listed
- Engine Company 27 (Washington, D.C.), NRHP-listed
- Engine Company 29, Washington, DC, NRHP-listed
- Engine Company 31, Washington, DC, NRHP-listed
- Fire Department Headquarters-Fire Alarm Headquarters, Washington, DC, NRHP-listed
- Truck Company F, Washington, D.C., NRHP-listed
- Truck House No. 13 (Washington, D.C.), NRHP-listed
- Vigilant Firehouse, Washington, DC, NRHP-listed

== Vatican City ==
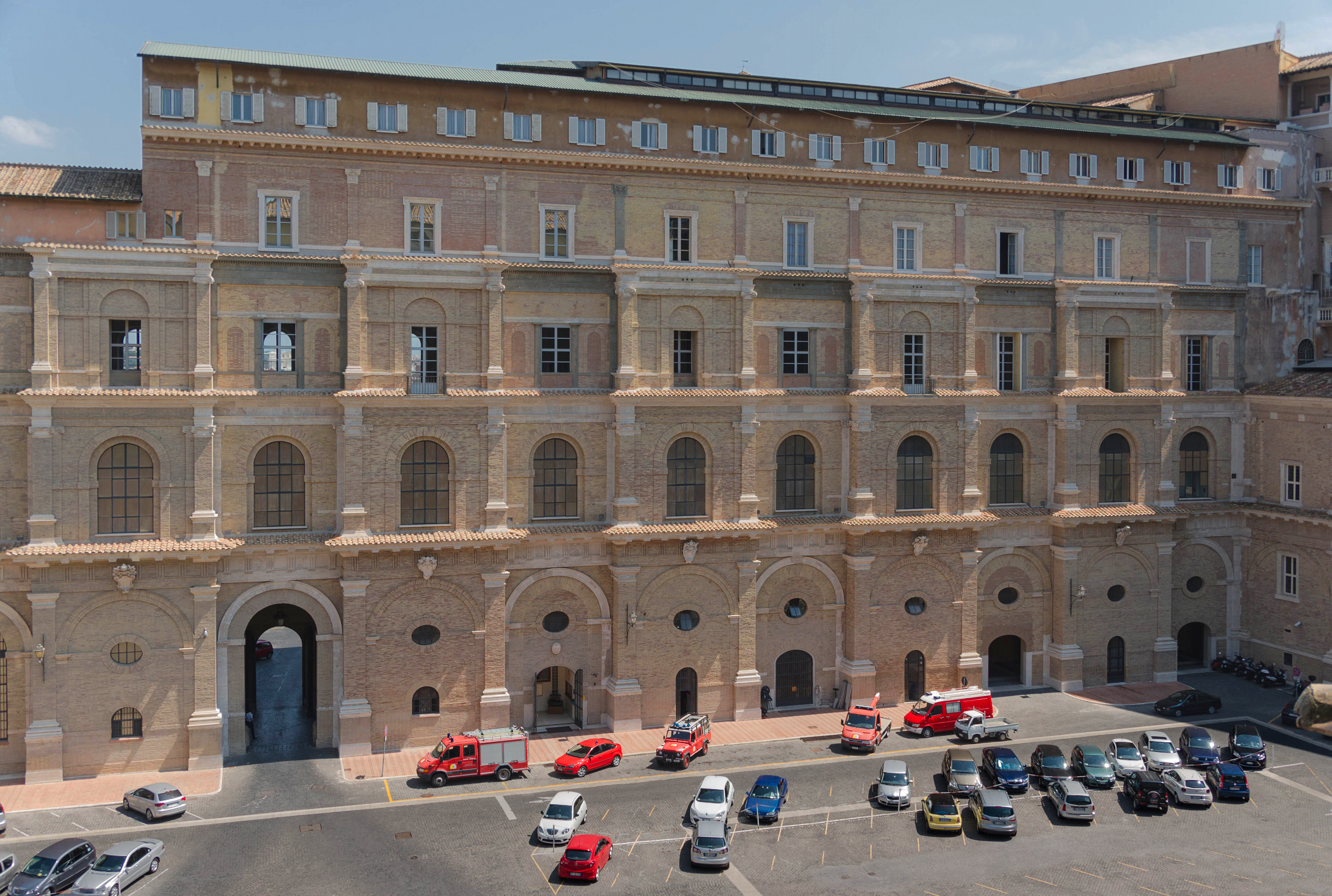
Vatican City fire station

- Vatican City's fire station, served by the Corps of Firefighters of the Vatican City State

== See also ==
- List of police stations
- List of fire department specialty facilities, including fire alarm buildings and pumping stations
- List of firefighting monuments and memorials
- List of firefighting museums
- Fireboats
- List of fire lookout towers

Disambiguation lists of fire stations:

- Central Fire Station (disambiguation)
- Engine House (disambiguation)
- Fire Hall (disambiguation)
- Fire Station No. 1 (disambiguation), including variations such as "Engine House No. 1"
- Fire Station No. 2 (disambiguation)
- Fire Station No. 3 (disambiguation)
- Fire Station No. 4 (disambiguation)
- Fire Station No. 5 (disambiguation)
- Fire Station No. 6 (disambiguation)
- Fire Station No. 7 (disambiguation)
- Fire Station No. 8 (disambiguation)
- Fire Station No. 9 (disambiguation)
- Fire Station No. 10 (disambiguation)
- Fire Station No. 11 (disambiguation)
- Fire Station No. 12 (disambiguation)
- Fire Station No. 13 (disambiguation)
- Fire Station No. 14 (disambiguation)
- Fire Station No. 15 (disambiguation)
- Fire Station No. 16 (disambiguation)
- Fire Station No. 17 (disambiguation)
- Fire Station No. 18 (disambiguation)
- Fire Station No. 19 (disambiguation)
- Fire Station No. 20 (disambiguation)
- Fire Station No. 21 (disambiguation)
- Fire Station No. 22 (disambiguation)
- Fire Station No. 23 (disambiguation)
- Fire Station No. 25 (disambiguation)
- Fire Station No. 30 (disambiguation), including variations such as "Engine House No. 25"
