= Fire Station No. 17 =

Fire Station No. 17, and variations such as Engine House No. 17 may refer to:

- Portland Fire Station No. 17, Portland, Oregon
- Engine Company 17, Washington, D.C.

== See also ==
- List of fire stations
