= Fire Station No. 20 =

Fire Station No. 20, and variations such as Engine House No. 20, may refer to:

- Steam Engine Company No. 20 (1735 Bardstown Road), Louisville, Kentucky, one of 18 Historic Firehouses of Louisville
- Steam Engine Company No. 20 (1330 Bardstown Road), Louisville, Kentucky, one of 18 Historic Firehouses of Louisville

== See also ==
- List of fire stations
