= Fire Station No. 25 =

Fire Station No. 25, and variations such as Engine House No. 25, may refer to:

- Fire Station No. 25 (Seattle, Washington)
- Engine Company 25 (Washington, D.C.)

== See also ==
- List of fire stations
