= Fire Station No. 23 =

Fire Station No. 23, and variations such as Engine House No. 23, may refer to:

- Fire Station No. 23 (Los Angeles, California)
- Fire Station No. 23 (Seattle, Washington)

== See also ==
- List of fire stations
