= Chief Lippert Fire Station =

- U.S. National Register of Historic Places
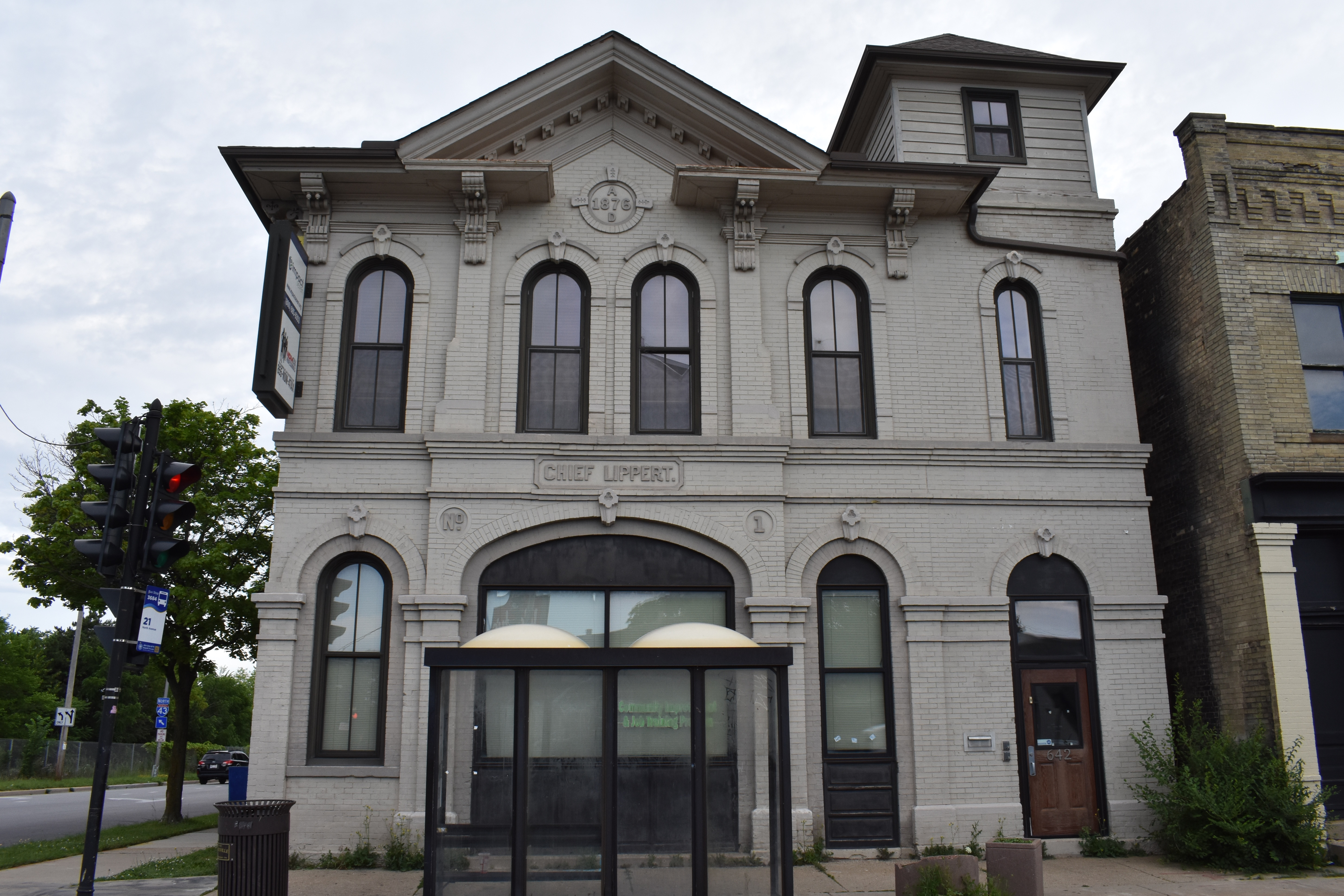
- Chief Lippert Fire Station in 2026

- Location within Wisconsin
- Location: 642 W. North Ave., Milwaukee, Wisconsin
- Coordinates: 43.06051°N 87.91977°W
- Area: less than one acre
- Built: 1876
- Architect: Thomas Philpot
- Architectural style: Italianate
- NRHP reference No.: 88002007
- Added to NRHP: January 1, 1989

The Chief Lippert Fire Station, also known as Chemical Engine House No. 1, is a historic fire station built in 1876, two miles north of Milwaukee's central business district. It was listed on the National Register of Historic Places in 1988.

== History ==
Milwaukee's fire department began in 1837 as a small volunteer fire company. Its equipment consisted of buckets, axes and some ladders, all kept in a shed in the central business district. In 1839 the company acquired its first "fire engine," which amounted to a hand-operated pump mounted on a wagon pulled to fires by men on foot. They named that first engine Neptune.

In 1845 the company bought a larger hand-pump with 300 feet of hose. Over the years the city's fire-fighting system continued to develop, dividing the city into fire districts in the 1850s, buying larger pumps which could reach the upper floors of five story buildings in the 1860s and adding horses to pull those pumps, and shifting from volunteer fire fighters to paid firemen starting in the 1860s. In 1869, a system of fire alarm boxes was installed throughout the city, connected by sixty miles of telegraph lines. The first full-time paid firemen came in 1874, while Henry Lippert was fire chief. Lippert was an immigrant from Weimar, Germany who had worked his way up through the volunteer fire department.

In 1876 the city built Chemical Engine House No. 1, which would be named the Chief Lippert Station, in a growing new neighborhood north of the downtown. The neighborhood consisted largely of tightly-packed houses built of wood, so a fire station was needed, but municipal water lines had not yet reached the neighborhood. Homes were fed by private wells which were inadequate to supply a water pumper, so instead, the new station was built to house a "chemical fire engine," which could douse a fire with chemicals similar to a modern fire extinguisher.

The 1876 building was a two-story, cream brick building with a hip roof. It was designed by Milwaukee architect Thomas N. Philpot in Italianate style, with broad wooden eaves and a pedimented gable at the front. The decorative brickwork suggests pilasters, and the windows have round-arched tops. The wooden corner tower was probably added around 1883, originally seven stories tall, a watch tower from which firemen could look out over the surrounding city for smoke.

By 1883, water mains had reached throughout the neighborhood, so the chemical engine was no longer needed. It was replaced at the Lippert Station with a steam-powered fire engine pulled by horses. In 1908 a two-story cream brick block was added at the rear of the building to house horses and a hayloft. It was designed by Sebastian Brand, a fire fighter in the Milwaukee department who had immigrated from Germany.

Motorized trucks entered the Milwaukee fire department in 1915, but didn't replace the horses at the Lippert station until 1927. In the 1930s the seven-story watch-tower was no longer needed, given the ability of people to call in fires on telephones, and most of the 50-year-old wooden tower was torn off, reducing it to the three stories that remain today.

In 1948 the Lippert station was no longer needed as a fire station. The building served as a branch library starting in 1951. Starting in 1972 it housed offices of the Model Cities Program. In 1977 it became the headquarters of the Inner City Arts Council, which painted the mural on the building's west side in 1984.

Today the Chief Lippert station is Milwaukee's oldest well-preserved fire station, one of the first carefully designed as a fire station with living quarters for the crew, rather than a simple shed to house equipment. It is also the only remaining Italianate public building from an era when Milwaukee's city hall was Italianate, along with other firehouses and schools.
