= J. C. Osgood Firehouse =

- U.S. National Register of Historic Places
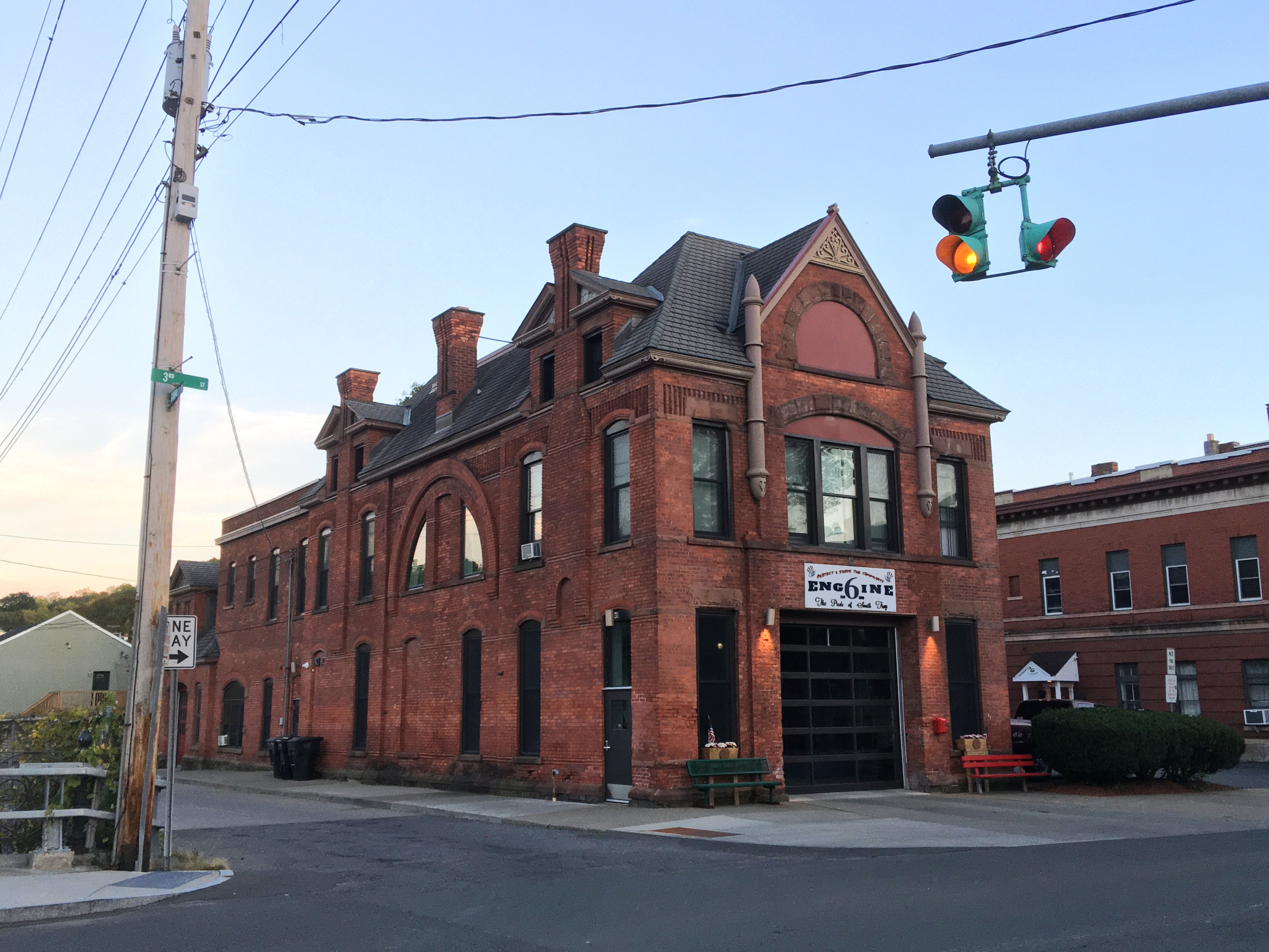
- October 2025

- Location within New York Location within the United States
- Location: 316-324 Third St., Troy, New York
- Coordinates: 42°43′11″N 73°41′33″W
- Area: less than one acre
- Built: 1889
- Architectural style: Queen Anne
- NRHP reference No.: 00001231
- Added to NRHP: November 2, 2000

J. C. Osgood Firehouse, now known as Engine Company 6, is a historic fire station located at the corner of 3rd Street and Canal Ave in the city of Troy in Rensselaer County, New York. It was built in 1889 and is an inverted L-shaped, brick building in the Queen Anne style. It was originally the home of Pumper 3 and Hook and Ladder 2. The main section is 2 1/2 stories, dropping to 2 stories in the midsection, with a 1 1/2-story wing at the rear. It features an irregular roofline topped with finials, distinctive patterns of decorative detailing, contrasting materials and forms, and medieval-type chimneys.

It was listed on the National Register of Historic Places in 2000.
