= Portage Street Fire Station =

- U.S. National Register of Historic Places
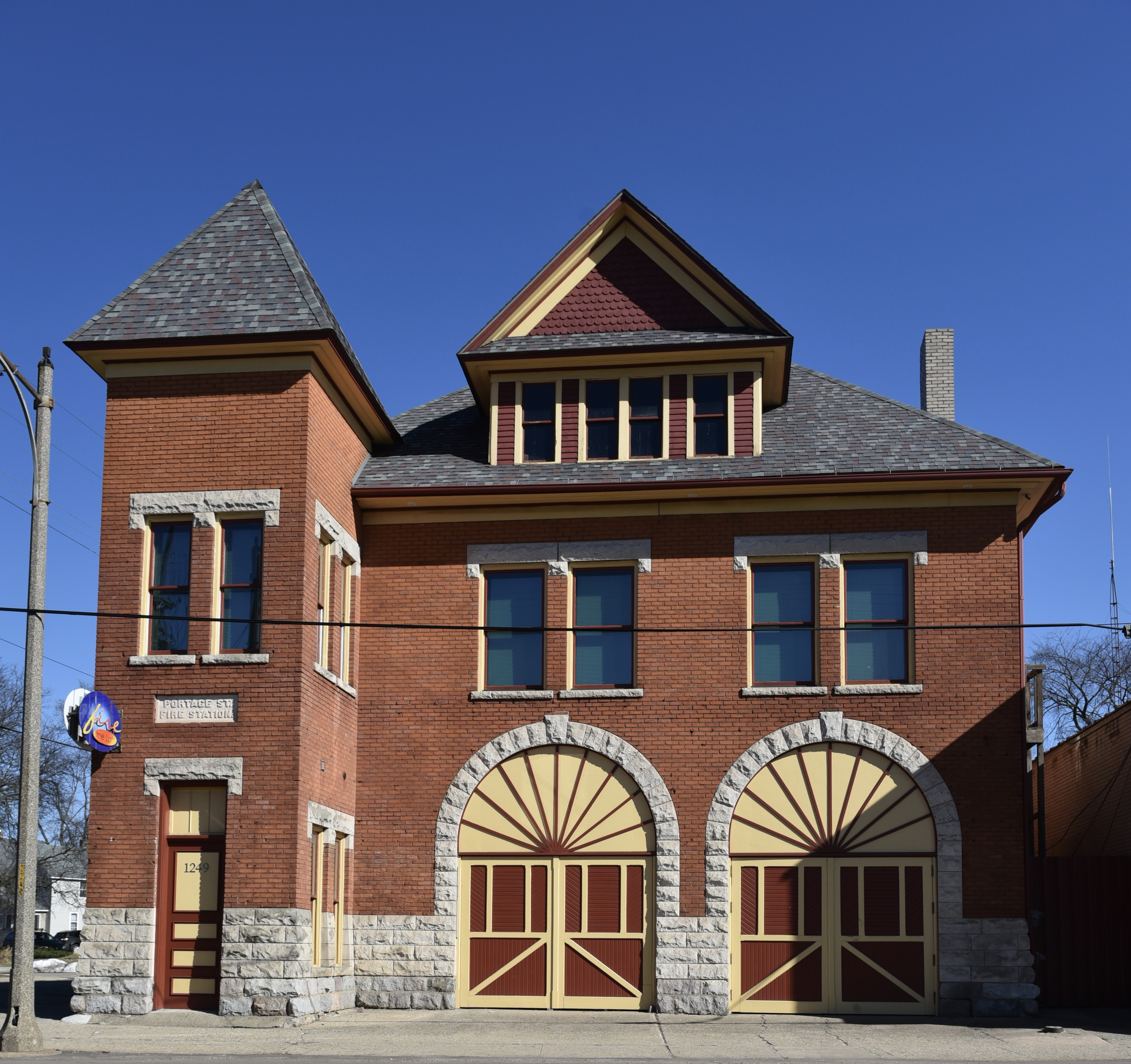
- Interactive map
- Location: 1249 Portage St., Kalamazoo, Michigan
- Coordinates: 42°16′46″N 85°34′12″W
- Area: less than one acre
- Built: 1903
- Built by: Moore McQuigg
- Architect: Robert M. Gallup
- NRHP reference No.: 85002150
- Added to NRHP: September 12, 1985

The Portage Street Fire Station is a former fire station located at 1249 Portage Street in Kalamazoo, Michigan. It was listed on the National Register of Historic Places in 1985. As of 2018, the space houses the Fire Historical and Cultural Arts Collaborative.

== History ==
Kalamazoo grew rapidly at the end of the nineteenth century; in particular, southeastern part of Kalamazoo near Washington Square experienced rapid growth after a series of large paper mills opened nearby between 1890 and 1900. However, the area lacked adequate fire coverage. In 1903, the city council hired Kalamazoo architect Robert M. Gallup to draft plans for a new fire station. After some revision, local contractor Moore McQuigg was hired to construct the building. The station was completed in mid-1904.

The station, called "Engine House No. 2," was used by the city until 1953 when a new fire station was constructed nearby. The building housed a laundromat until about 1976. However, the building became severely deteriorated. It was purchased by a new owner in 1982 and rehabilitated to house a contracting business in the first floor and office space upstairs. As of 2018, the space houses the Fire Historical and Cultural Arts Collaborative.

== Description ==
The Portage Street Fire Station is a two-story orange brick structure, trimmed with yellow-gray, rock-face limestone, with a hip-and gable roof containing a total of five dormers. It measures 40 feet by 60 feet. It stands on a corner lot; attached to the building corner nearest the intersection is a pyramid-roof tower, projecting outside the footprint of the building proper. All of the building windows are one-over-one double hung units. The front facade has arched fire-door openings on the first floor. A limestone tablet in the front contains the inscription "Portage St. Fire Station."
