= Mount Gambier Fire Station =

Heritage-listed site in South Australia

- Location within Australia
- 37.832216°S 140.784415°E
- Location: Mount Gambier, South Australia

History
- Built: 1955

South Australian Heritage Register

The Mount Gambier Fire Station, at 40a Sturt Street, in Mount Gambier, South Australia is a historic site listed on the South Australian Heritage Register. It was built in 1955. It was deemed notable as "an unusual and intact example of a mid-1950s utilitarian purpose built service building. The building is representative of post-war functionalist architecture on a minor scale, and was the basis of the prototype for of a number of new regional fire stations. It demonstrates the provision and upgrading of public utilities after World War Two (Mt Gambier Heritage Survey, 1994)."

As of 2018, the building is being used as an optometrist office.

The current Mount Gambier Fire Station is located at 20 Crouch Street. It is staffed by alternating shifts of 5 firefighters during the day, and is backed up by retained crew overnight.
