= Portsmouth Fire Department No. 1 =

- U.S. National Register of Historic Places
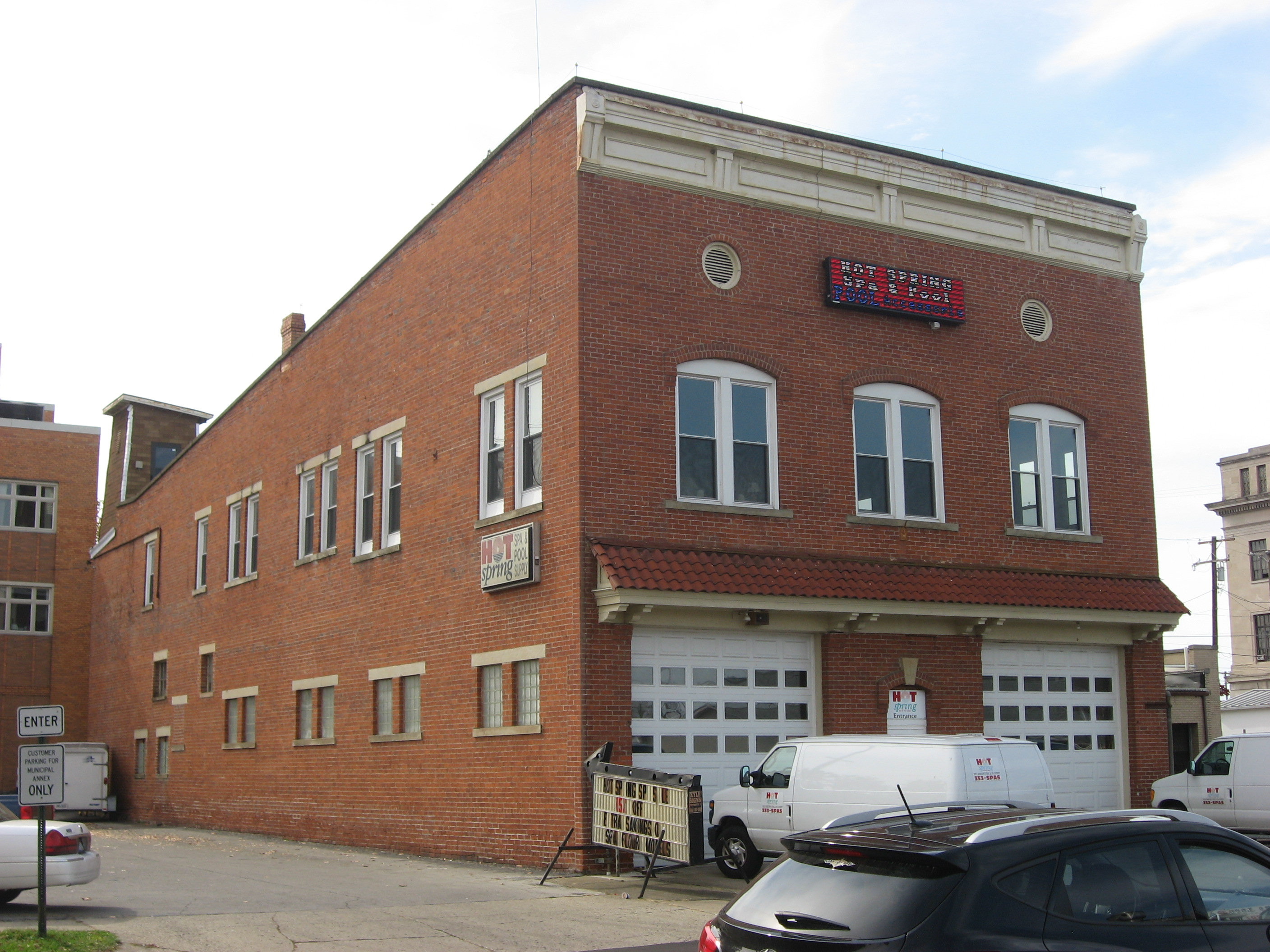

- Location within Ohio
- Location: 642 Seventh St., Portsmouth, Ohio
- Coordinates: 38°44′08″N 82°59′56″W
- Area: less than one acre
- Built: 1895
- Architectural style: Italianate
- MPS: Boneyfiddle MRA
- NRHP reference No.: 87002091
- Added to NRHP: December 8, 1987

Portsmouth Fire Department No. 1, at 642 Seventh St. in Portsmouth, Ohio, was built in 1895. It was listed on the National Register of Historic Places in 1987.

It is a two-and-a-half-story brick building, built on the site of Portsmouth's first fire station. It operated as a fire station until 1977.
