= Scott Street Firehouse =

- U.S. National Register of Historic Places
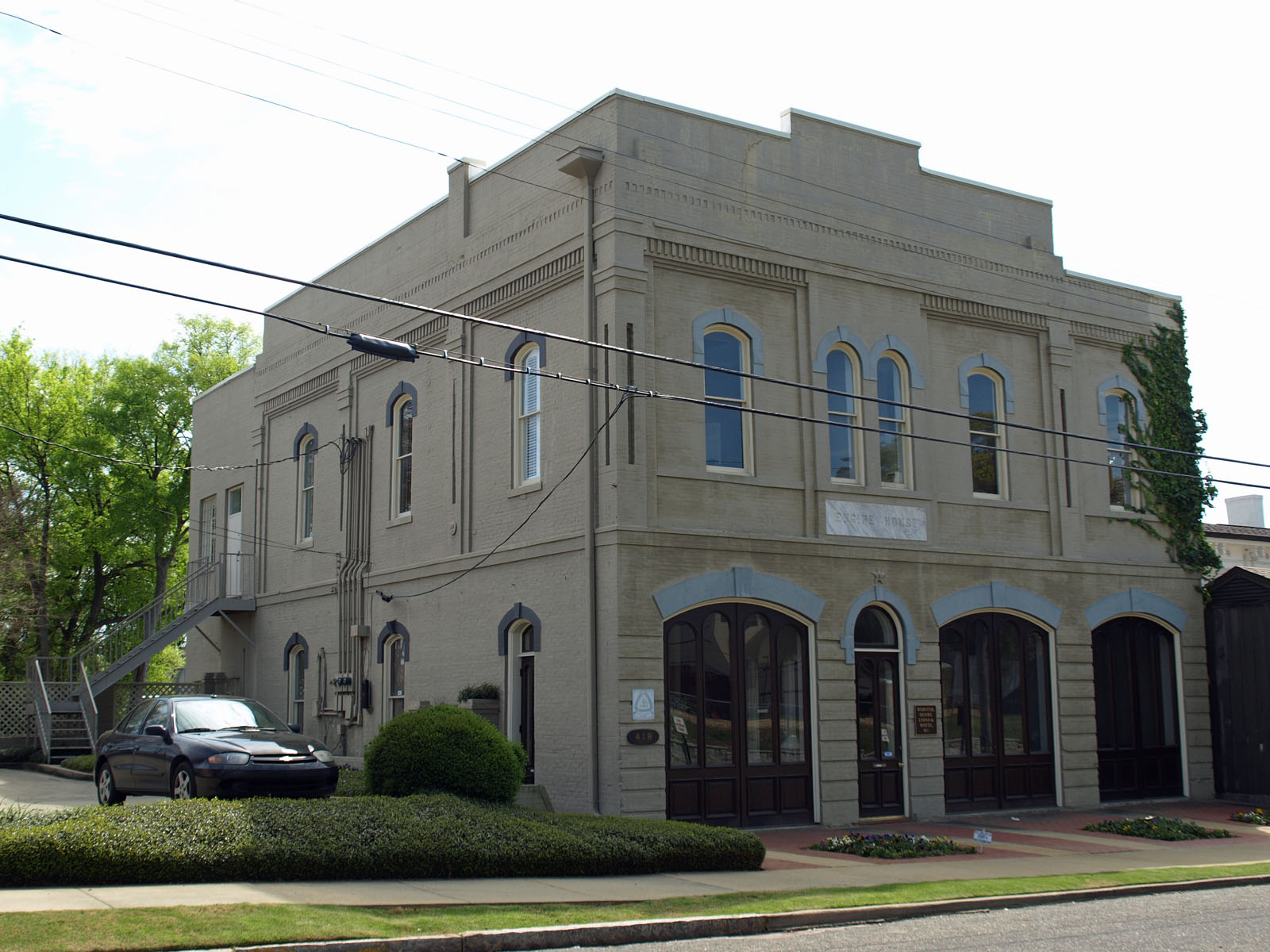
- Location: 418 Scott Street, Montgomery, Alabama
- Coordinates: 32°22′25″N 86°18′11″W
- Built: 1889
- Architectural style: Late Victorian
- NRHP reference No.: 81000133
- Added to NRHP: February 12, 1981

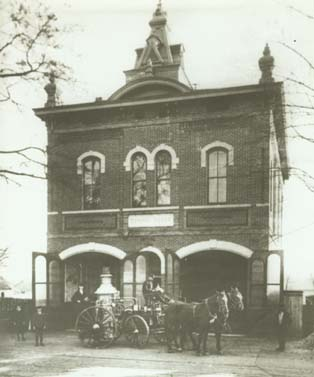
Before 1900.

The Scott Street Firehouse in Montgomery, Alabama, was built in 1889.

The originally Late Victorian building was renovated after 1900. It was built when Montgomery had expanded up the hill, so that horses would not have to haul equipment uphill. Horses were used until 1926, when it got motorized equipment, and the building was used as a fire station until 1966. In 1980, the building was renovated for use as office space.
