= Prahran Fire Station =

Heritage listed building in Victoria, Australia

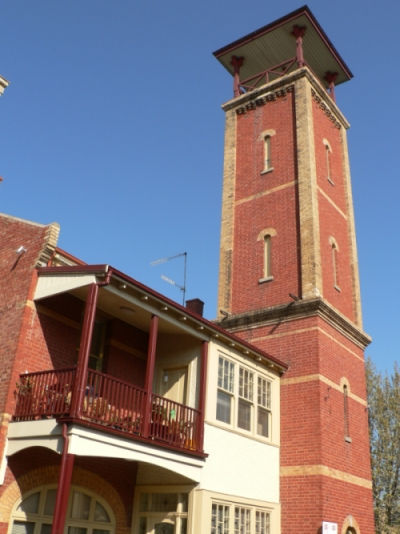

- Location within Australia
- 37.849867°S 144.992533°E
- Location: 44 Macquarie St, Prahran, Victoria

History
- Built: 1889

Victorian Heritage Register

The Prahran Fire Station, also known as the Former Prahran Fire Station, is a historic fire station in Prahran, Victoria.

It is a two-storey brick building and has an attached brick watchtower. It was built in 1889 and was considered advanced for its time, although its location on narrow Macquarie Street was difficult for fire apparatus to get out from, onto Chapel Street.
