= Hammersmith Fire Station =

Former fire station in London, England

Coordinates: 51.493845°N 0.22419392°W

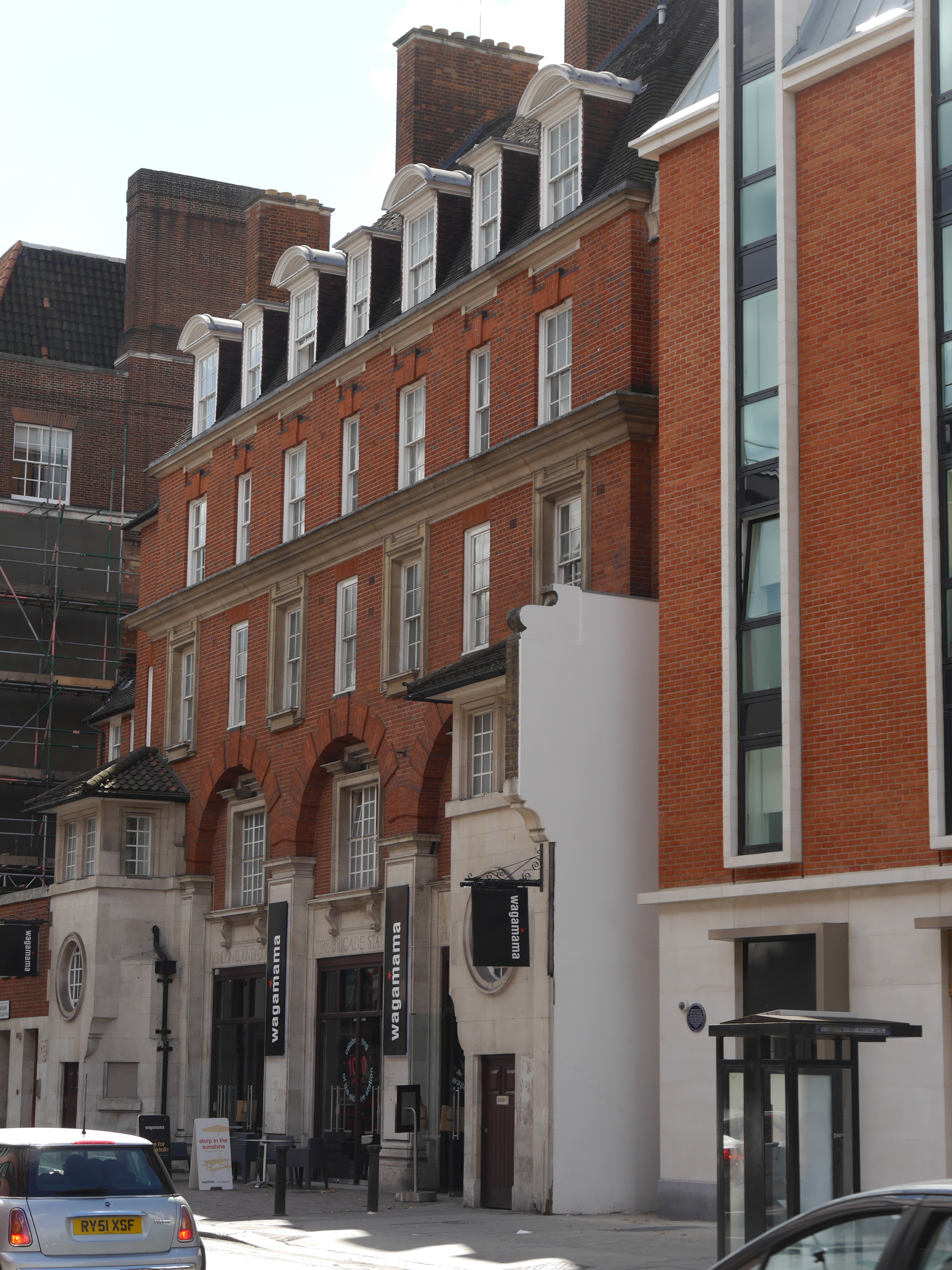
Old Fire Station, Hammersmith, 2014

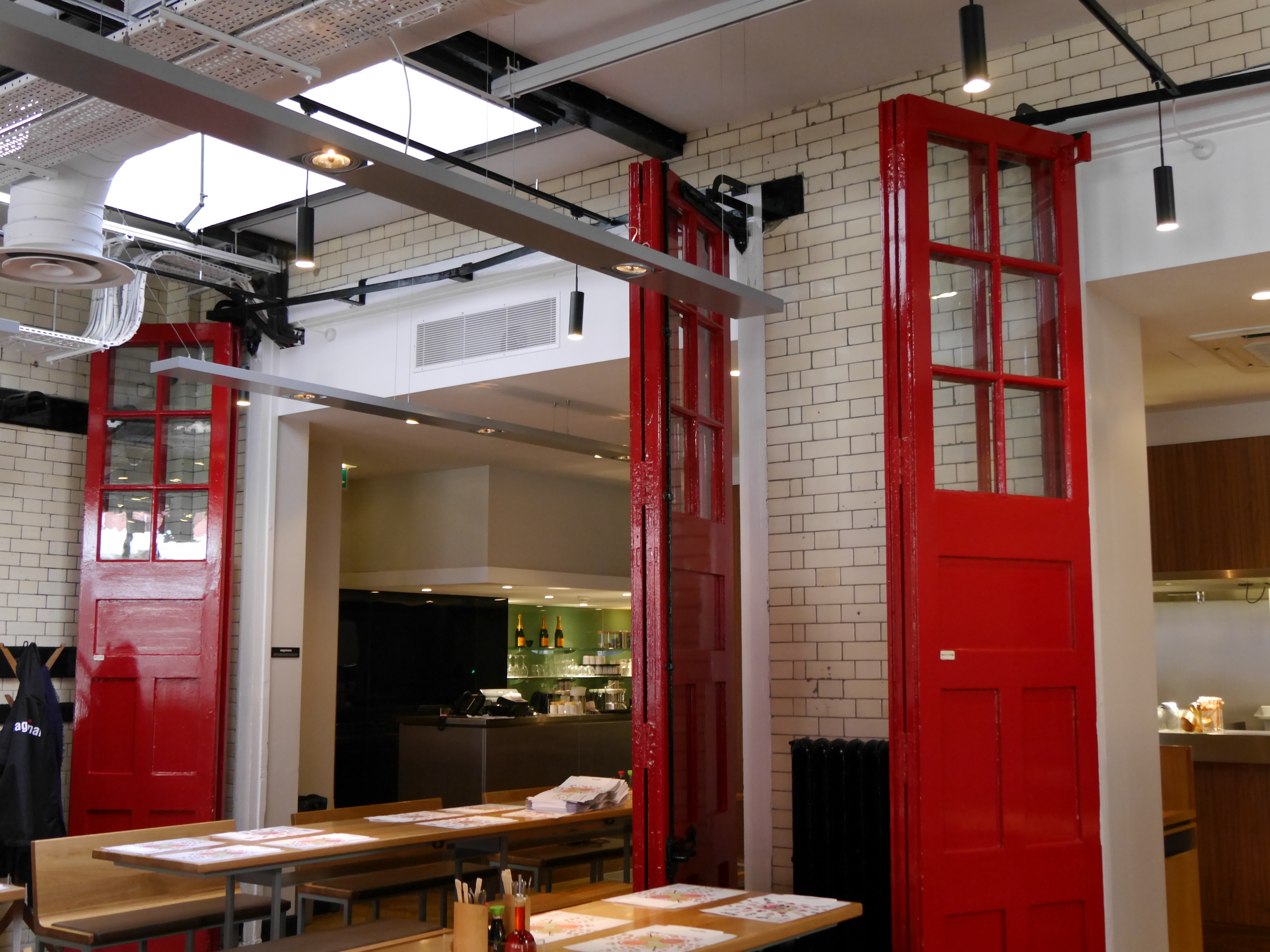
Interior, 2014

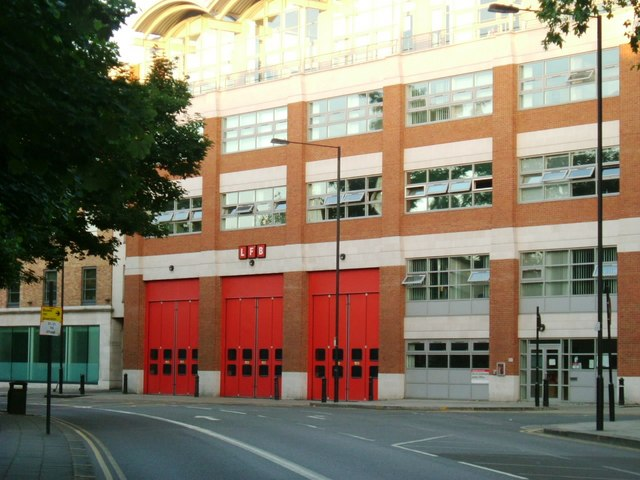
The current Hammersmith Fire Station at 190–192 Shepherd's Bush Road, operational since 2003

Hammersmith Fire Station is a Grade II listed building at 244 Shepherd's Bush Road, Hammersmith, London W6 7NL.

It was built in 1913 by the architect W. E. Riley.

After being decommissioned as a fire station in the 2000s, it was a pub called "The Old Fire Station", and is now a branch of the restaurant chain, Wagamama. It became their 100th restaurant.

Hammersmith's current fire station (since 2003) is located slightly further to the north in the same street, at 190–192.
