= Timeline of Shreveport, Louisiana =

The following is a timeline of the history of the city of Shreveport, Louisiana, United States.

== 19th century ==
- 1836 – Shreve Town Company organized; named for Henry Miller Shreve, one of its members.
- 1837 – Shreve Town Company begins selling plots of land.
- 1838 – Shreve Town becomes seat of newly formed Caddo Parish.
- 1839
  - Town of Shreveport incorporated.
  - John Octavius Sewall elected mayor.
- 1841 – Caddo Gazette newspaper begins publication.
- 1847 – Burial ground established.
- 1850
  - Population: 1,728.
  - Brewer's Hall built (approximate date).
- 1852 – South-Western newspaper begins publication.
- 1853 – Yellow fever outbreak.
- 1858 – Vicksburg, Shreveport and Texas Railroad begins operating.
- 1860 – Population: 2,190.
- 1861 – St. Mary's Convent founded.
- 1863 – Shreveport designated Louisiana Confederate capital (until 1865).
- 1866 – Charity Hospital established.
- 1870 – Population: 4,607.
- 1871
  - Shreveport becomes a city.
  - Daily Shreveport Times newspaper begins publication.
  - Crisp's Gaiety Theater built.
- 1873
  - Dallas-Shreveport railway in operation.
  - Yellow fever outbreak.
- 1879 – Shreveport Daily Standard newspaper begins publication.
- 1880
  - First Presbyterian Church built.
  - Population: 8,009.
- 1886 – Grand Opera House built.
- 1887 – Shreveport Waterworks Pumping Station built.
- 1890
  - Shreveport Library Association formed.
  - Population: 11,979.
- 1895 – Evening Judge newspaper in publication.
- 1896 – Holy Trinity Catholic Church rebuilt.
- 1899 – Genevieve Orphanage established.
- 1900 – Population: 16,013.

== 20th century ==
- 1901 – People's Library established.
- 1902 – Shreveport Journal newspaper in publication.
- 1905 – Agudath Achim Synagogue dedicated.
- 1906 – Oil discovered at Caddo Lake in vicinity of Shreveport.
- 1907 – Nearby Bossier City incorporated.
- 1909 – Centenary College of Louisiana relocated to Shreveport from Jackson.
- 1910
  - Schumpert Memorial Hospital and Chamber of Commerce established.
  - Population: 28,015.
- 1912 – United States Post Office and Courthouse built.
- 1915 – Traffic Street Bridge built.
- 1920 – Population: 43,874.
- 1922
  - Shreveport Art Club active.
  - Shriners Hospitals for Children opened.
- 1923 – Public library built.
- 1925 – Strand Theatre built.
- 1926
  - KWKH radio begins broadcasting.
  - Caddo Parish courthouse built.
- 1927 – Dodd College established.
- 1928
  - KRMD and KTBS radio begin broadcasting.
  - Woman's Auxiliary to the Shreveport Medical Society formed.
- 1929 – Shreveport Municipal Memorial Auditorium built.
- 1930
  - East Texas Oil Field discovered in vicinity of Shreveport.
  - Population: 76,655.
- 1931 – Shreveport Downtown Airport begins operating.
- 1933 – U.S. military Barksdale Airfield dedicated.
- 1934 – Long–Allen Bridge opens.
- 1935 – Rodessa oil field discovered in vicinity of Shreveport.
- 1940 – Population: 98,167.
- 1948
  - U.S. military Barksdale Air Force Base active.
  - KWKH's Louisiana Hayride radio programme begins broadcast.
- 1950
  - Shreveport metropolitan area was started
  - Population: 127,206.
- 1952 – North Louisiana Historical Association established.
- 1954 - KSLA-TV (television) begins broadcasting.
- 1955 - KTBS-TV (television) begins broadcasting.
- 1960
  - Shreveport metropolitan area Added Bossier Parish
  - Population: 164,372.
- 1965 - LSU Health Sciences Center Shreveport opened.
- 1967 – Louisiana State University in Shreveport opens.
- 1970 – Population: 182,064.
- 1972 – Quail Creek Cinema in business.
- 1973 - Shreveport metropolitan area Added Webster Parish
- 1977 – Pioneer Heritage Center and Spring Street Historical Museum founded.
- 1980 – Population: 205,820.
- 1981 – General Motors plant begins operating in Shreveport.
- 1983 - Shreveport metropolitan area Removed Webster Parish
- 1986
  - Roman Catholic Diocese of Shreveport established.
  - Commercial National Bank Tower (hi-rise) built.
- 1988 – Jim McCrery becomes U.S. representative for Louisiana's 4th congressional district.
- 1990 – Population: 198,525.
- 1993 - Shreveport metropolitan area Redded Webster Parish
- 1994
  - Stephens African American Museum founded.
  - Harrah's casino built.
- 1998
  - Keith Hightower becomes mayor.
  - City website online (approximate date).

== 21st century ==
- 2003
  - Shreveport – Bossier City metropolitan area Replaced Webster Parish to De Soto Parish
- 2004 – Convention Center built.
- 2006 – Cedric Glover becomes first African-American in city elected mayor.
- 2009 – John Fleming becomes U.S. representative for Louisiana's 4th congressional district.
- 2010 – Population: 199,311.
- 2014 – Ollie Tyler becomes first African-American woman in city elected mayor.
- 2023
  - October 25: Mike Johnson is elected Speaker of the U.S. House of Representatives, becoming the first U.S. Congressman from Louisiana to hold this position.
- 2026
  - April 19: Eight children are shot dead in a domestic shooting incident.

== See also ==
- History of Shreveport, Louisiana
- List of mayors of Shreveport, Louisiana
- National Register of Historic Places listings in Caddo Parish, Louisiana
- Other cities in Louisiana:
  - Timeline of Baton Rouge, Louisiana
  - Timeline of New Orleans

== Bibliography ==
published in 19th century

- "Shreveport". Rand McNally Official Railway Guide and Hand Book for the United States and the Dominion of Canada. 1884.
- "Shreveport" . Encyclopædia Britannica. Vol. 21 (9th ed.). 1886. p. 843.
- George E. Waring, Jr.; Department of the Interior, Census Office (1887), "Louisiana: Shreveport", Report on the Social Statistics of Cities: Southern and the Western States, Washington DC: Government Printing Office, pp. 296–300
- "Caddo Parish". Biographical and Historical Memoirs of Northwest Louisiana. Nashville: Southern Publishing Company. 1890.

published in 20th century

- F.H. Richardson (1905). "Shreveport, Louisiana". Richardson's Southern Guide. Chicago: Monarch Book Company – via Internet Archive.
- "Shreveport" . Encyclopædia Britannica. Vol. 24 (11th ed.). 1910. p. 1015.
- Alcée Fortier (1914), "Shreveport", Louisiana: Comprising Sketches of Parishes, Towns, Events, Institutions, and Persons, Arranged in Cyclopedic Form, Century Historical Association
- Federal Writers' Project (1941). "Shreveport". Louisiana: a Guide to the State. American Guide Series. NY: Hastings House. hdl:2027/uc1.$b727648. ISBN 9780403021697 – via HathiTrust. + Chronology
- Ory Mazar Nergal, ed. (1980), "Shreveport, LA", Encyclopedia of American Cities, New York: E.P. Dutton, OL 4120668M
- Marguerite R. Plummer; Gary D. Joiner (2000). Historic Shreveport-Bossier: An Illustrated History of Shreveport and Bossier City. San Antonio: Historical Publishing Network. ISBN 978-1-893619-08-1.

published in 21st century

- Florence M. Jumonville (2002). "Caddo Parish". Louisiana History: An Annotated Bibliography. Greenwood. pp. 401–486. ISBN 978-0-313-28240-9.
- Paul T. Hellmann (2006). "Louisiana: Shreveport". Historical Gazetteer of the United States. Routledge. pp. 441–442. ISBN 1-135-94859-3.
- Gary D. Joiner; Ernie Roberson (2010). Lost Shreveport: Vanishing Scenes from the Red River Valley. Charleston, SC: History Press. ISBN 978-1-59629-856-9.
