= Fire Station No. 10 =

Fire Station No. 10 or variations such as Engine House No. 10, may refer to:

United States

(ordered by state then city)

- Fire Station No. 10 (Birmingham, Alabama)
- Hose House No. 10, Evansville, Indiana
- South Highlands Fire Station, Shreveport, Louisiana, also known as "Fire Station No. 10"
- Engine House No. 10 (Columbus, Ohio)
- Pennsylvania National Fire Museum, Harrisburg, Pennsylvania, in the 1899 fire station building of Reily Hose Company No. 10
- Fire Station No. 10 (Tacoma, Washington)
- Engine House No. 10 (Washington, D.C.)

== See also ==
- List of fire stations
