= Jefferson Hotel =

Jefferson Hotel or Hotel Jefferson may refer to:

- Jefferson Hotel (Shreveport, Louisiana), listed on the National Register of Historic Places (NRHP)
- Hotel Jefferson (St. Louis, Missouri), NRHP-listed
- Jefferson Hotel (Jefferson, Texas), asserted to have been built in 1851, subject of a My Ghost Story episode (and if it is the hotel known as "Excelsior House", is NRHP-listed as an element of Jefferson Historic District (Jefferson, Texas))
- Jefferson Hotel (Richmond, Virginia), NRHP-listed
- The Jefferson, a hotel in Washington, D.C.
