= Vivian station =

- Kansas City Southern Depot
- U.S. National Register of Historic Places
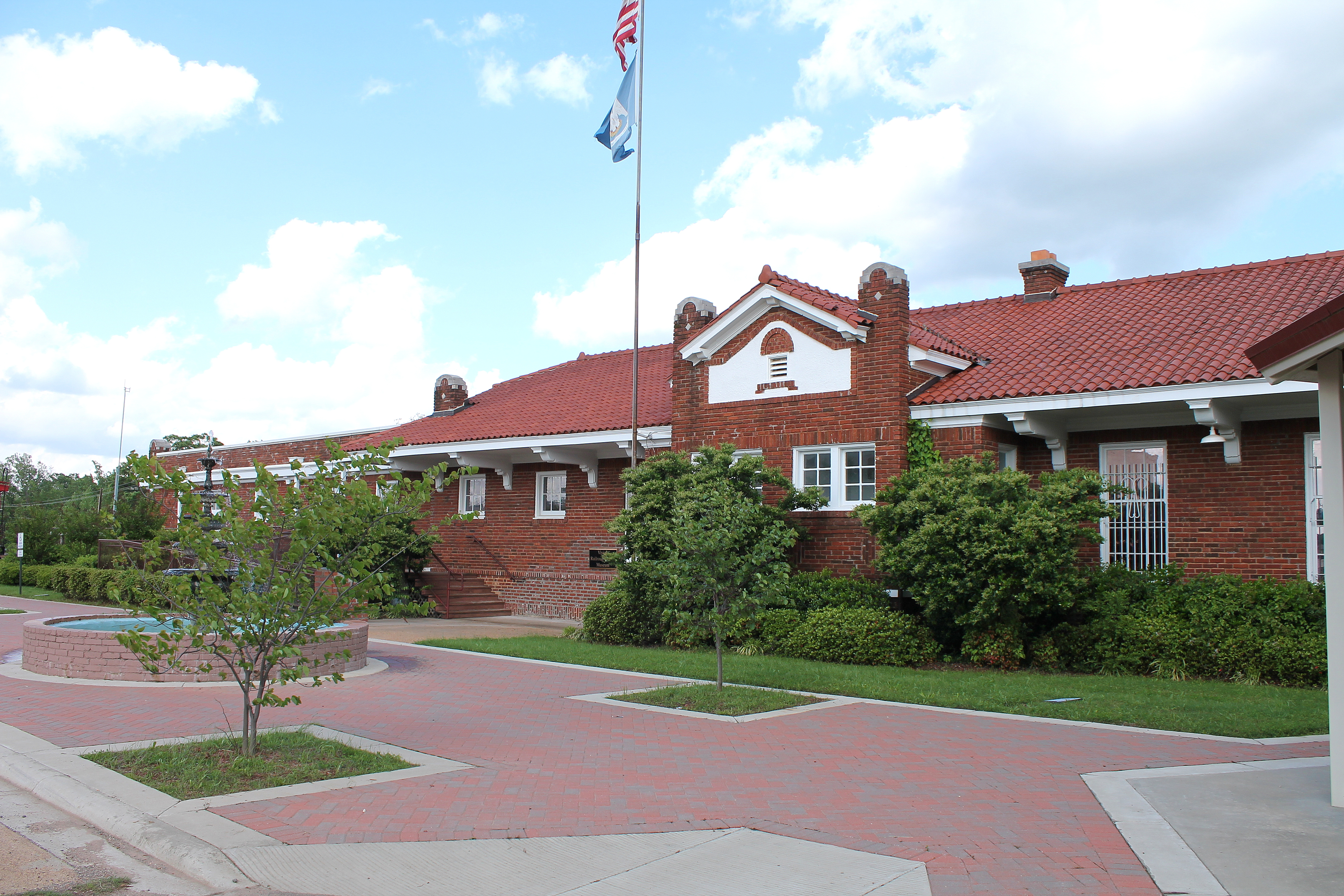

- Location within Louisiana Location within the United States
- Location: 100 North West Front Street, Vivian, Louisiana
- Coordinates: 32°52′19″N 93°59′07″W
- Area: less than one acre
- Architectural style: Bungalow/Craftsman
- NRHP reference No.: 94001578
- Added to NRHP: January 20, 1995

The Kansas City Southern Depot in Vivian, Louisiana was listed on the National Register of Historic Places in 1995.

It is a one-story brownish-red brick building with Craftsman influence that was built in 1921.

The building is now home to the Vivian Railroad Station Museum and is operated by the Historical Society of North Caddo. The museum features railroad artifacts, photos, and displays about North Caddo Parish history.

== See also ==
- National Register of Historic Places listings in Caddo Parish, Louisiana

Preceding station	Kansas City Southern Railway	Following station
Myrtis toward Kansas City	Main Line	Lewis toward Port Arthur
