= St. Paul's Bottoms =

Historic district in Shreveport, Louisiana

- U.S. National Register of Historic Places
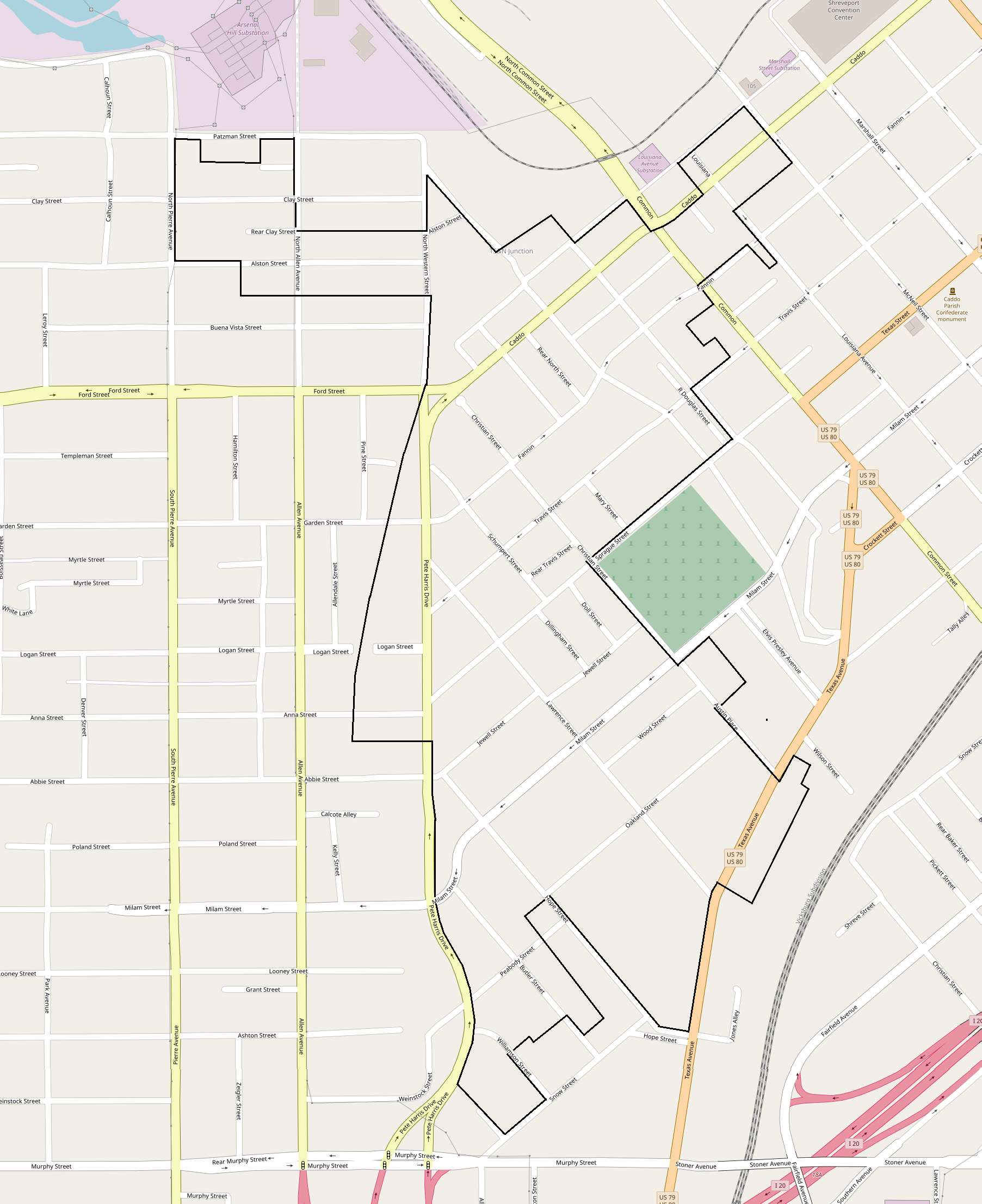
- St. Paul's Bottom historic district outlined in black

- Location within Louisiana
- Location: Roughly bounded by Western and Pierre Aves., Alston, Christian, Oakland, and Snow Sts., Shreveport, Louisiana
- Coordinates: 32.506°N 93.756°W
- Area: 134 acres (54 ha)
- Built: 1880
- Architectural style: Bungalow/Craftsman, Queen Anne, Shotgun
- NRHP reference No.: 84000033
- Added to NRHP: October 11, 1984

St. Paul's Bottoms was a section of Shreveport, Louisiana established by African Americans. It had hotels for blacks in what was a segregated city as well as offices and saloons. Known as a redlight district there was prostitution in the area. The Castle Hotel on Sprague Street was part of the district. The area was renamed Ledbetter Heights in honor of blues singer Huddie Ledbetter. It is listed on the National Register of Historic Places. In 1999 the historic districts boundary was expanded.

St. Paul's Bottoms was established in a low lying area west of downtown Shreveport.

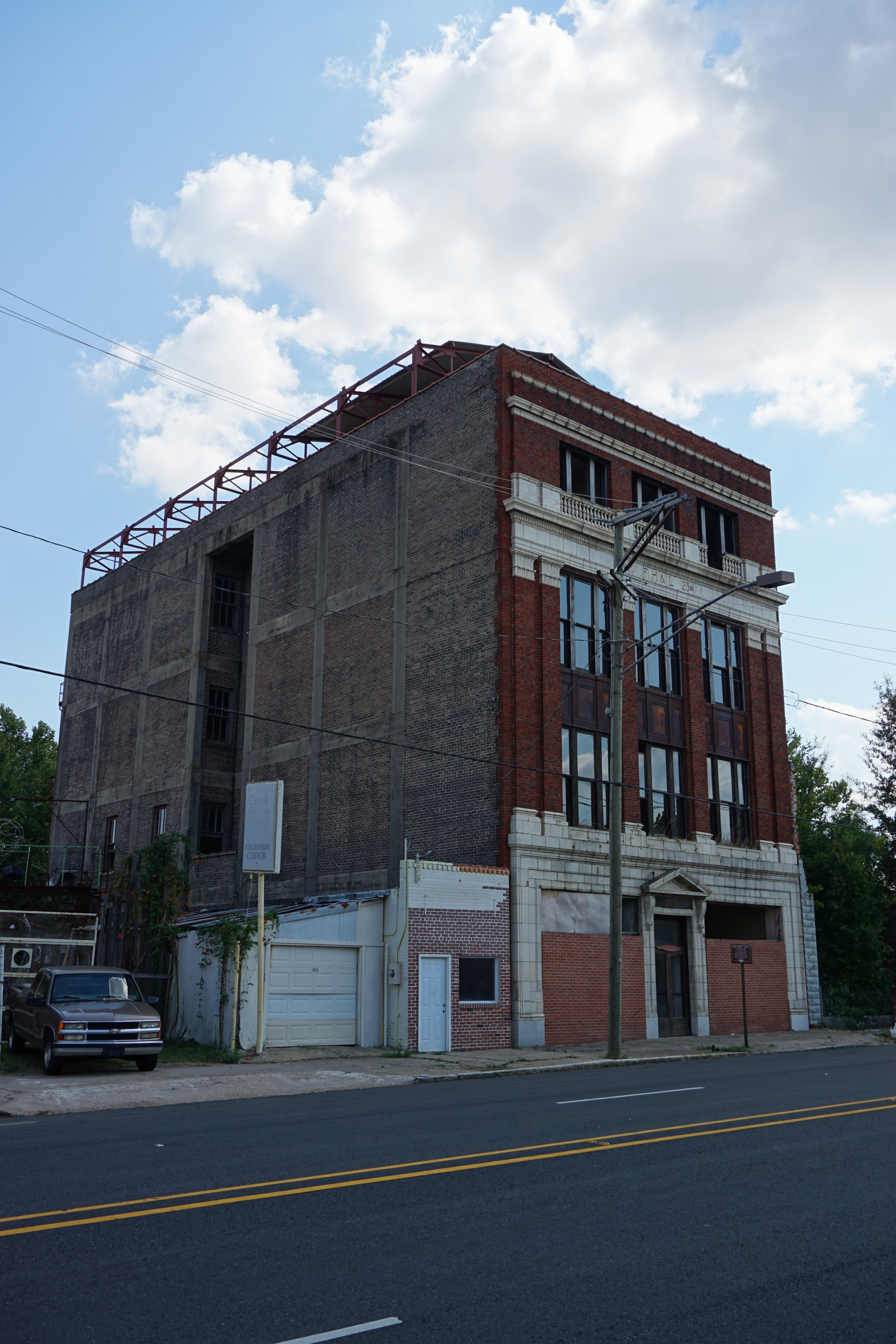
Calanthean Temple in Shreveport

Contributing properties include the Antioch Baptist Church built in 1901 and the Calanthean Temple built in 1923 by an Order of Calanthe women's group. Most of the district is residential. The Calanthean Temple was designed by Shreveport based architect Edward F. Neild. The building's rooftop garden hosted concerts including by renowned African American musicians. The rest of the building included offices of black physicians, lawyers, and other professionals as well as the Freeman & Harris Café that operated for more than 70 years and had a renowned stuffed shrimp dish. Cora Murdock Allen was a member.

The Castle Hotel opened in the 1920s under Cora Snowden's leadership. It was originally built as her home. It hosted Martin Luther King Jr. In the 1960s, 1970s and 1980s a series of fires and crimes including robberies hit it hard. It was eventually demolished. The Sprague Street Hotel was also in the area. Residents lived in "shotgun" houses. Many of the buildings in the area have been torn down.

== See also ==
- National Register of Historic Places listings in Caddo Parish, Louisiana
- Shreveport Sun
- Mooretown, Shreveport, Louisiana, another historically African American neighborhood in Shreveport
