= Masonic Temple (Shreveport, Louisiana) =

- U.S. National Register of Historic Places
- U.S. Historic district – Contributing property
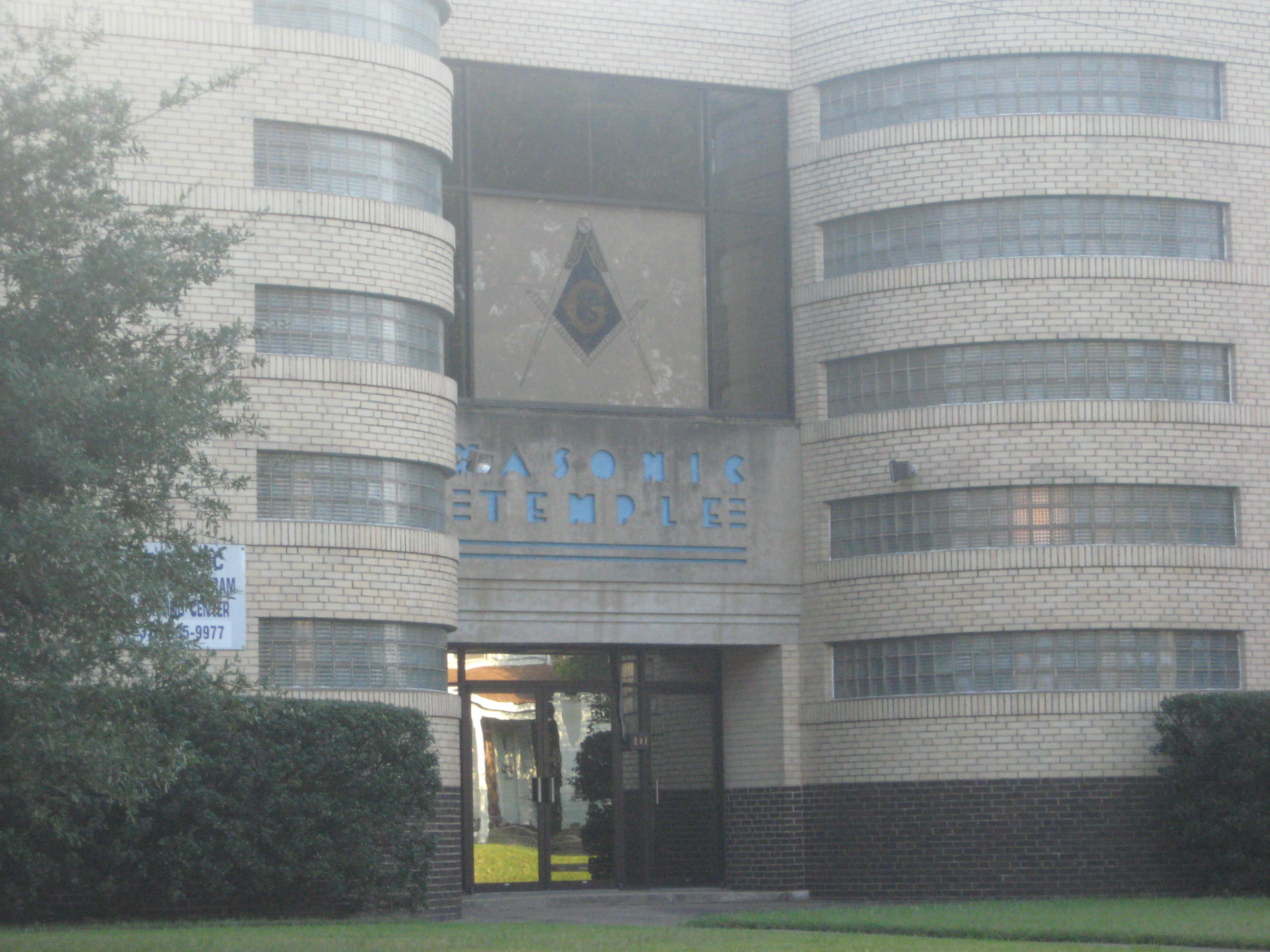
- Focused view which makes it appear to be many stories tall. Compare to photos in NRHP application.

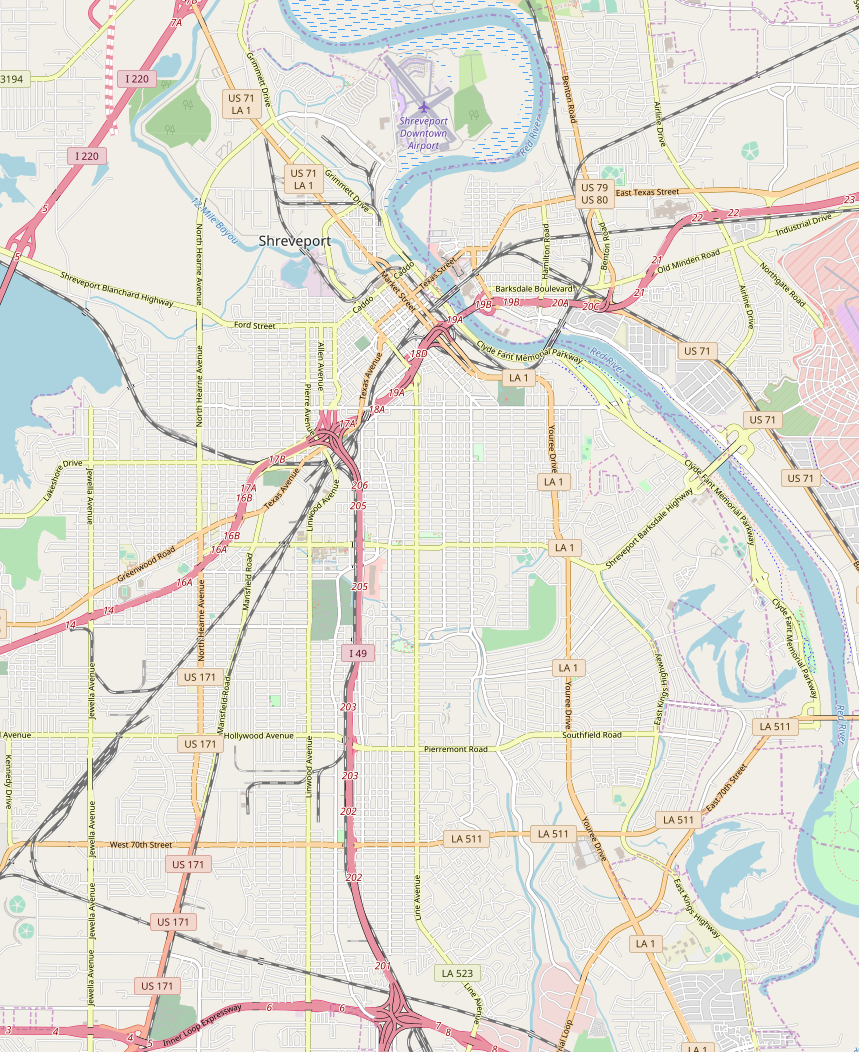
- Location within Shreveport
- Location: 1805 Creswell Avenue, Shreveport, Louisiana
- Coordinates: 32°29′39″N 93°44′29″W
- Area: less than one acre
- Built: 1937
- Built by: Werner Co.
- Architect: Theodore A. Flaxman
- Architectural style: Moderne
- Part of: Highland Historic District (ID87000192)
- NRHP reference No.: 91000702

Significant dates
- Added to NRHP: June 10, 1991
- Designated CP: February 19, 1987

The Masonic Temple in Shreveport, Louisiana is a historic building located at 1805 Creswell Avenue in Shreveport, Louisiana. Built in 1937 in Moderne style, it is a two-story brick building designed by architect Theodore Flaxman, who indicated that he was strongly influenced by the curvilinear buildings of European modernist Erich Mendelsohn.

The building was a contributing property of Highland Historic District since its creation in 1987, and was subsequently enlisted as an individual property on the National Register of Historic Places in 1991.

== See also ==
- National Register of Historic Places listings in Caddo Parish, Louisiana
