= Kings Highway Christian Church =

Historic church in Louisiana, United States

- U.S. National Register of Historic Places
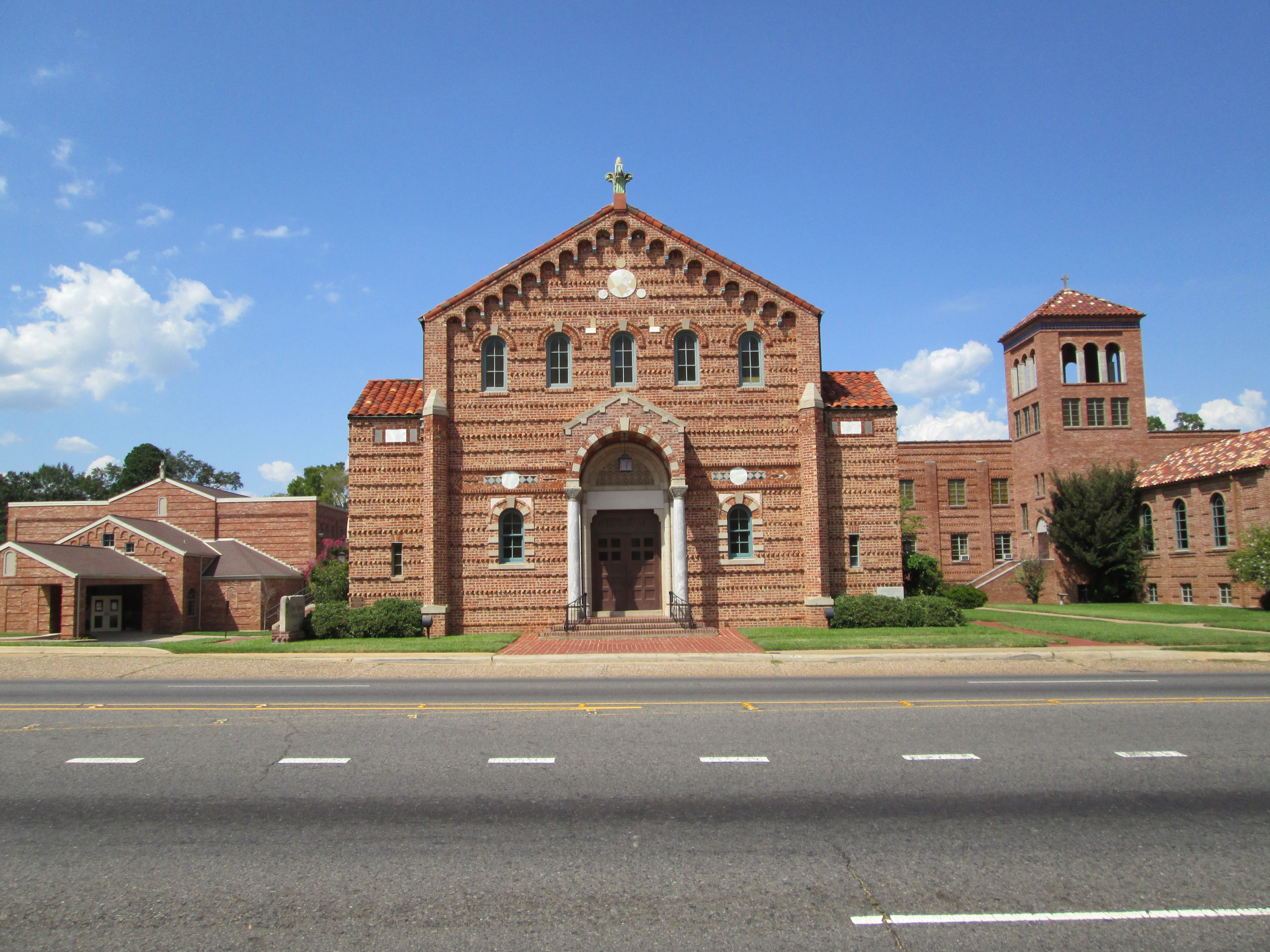

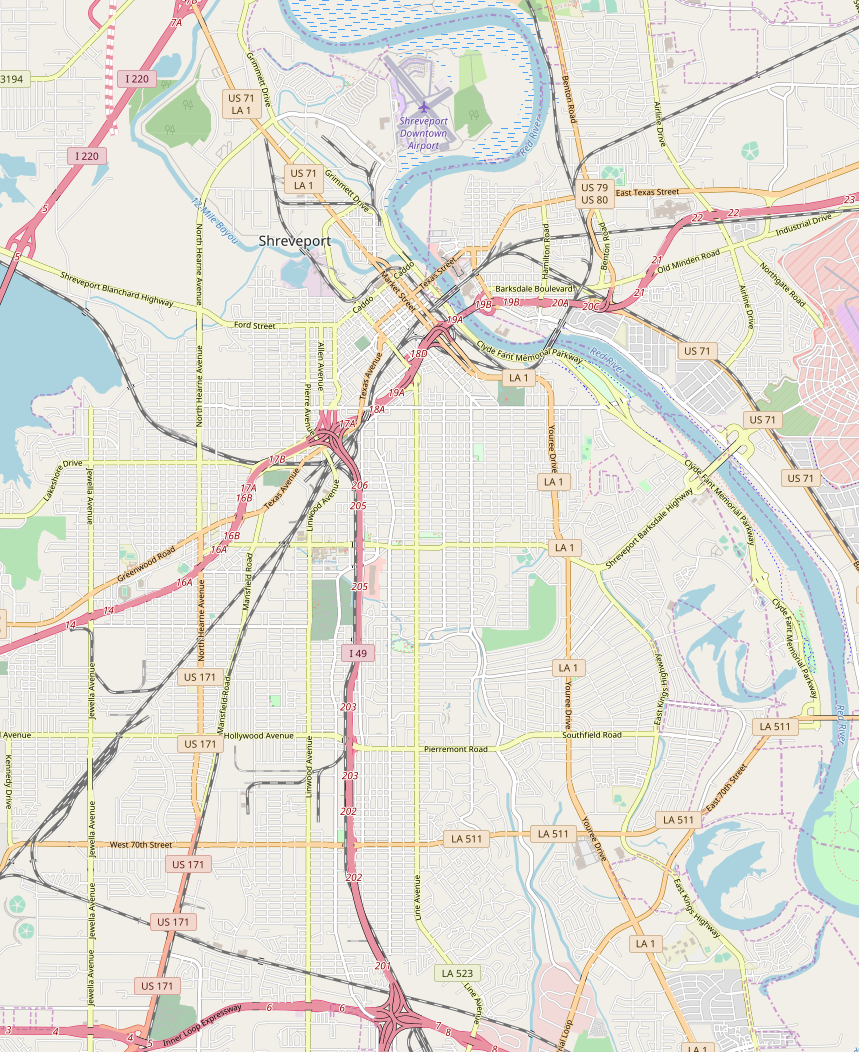
- Location within Shreveport
- Location: 806 Kings Highway, Shreveport, Louisiana
- Coordinates: 32°28′54″N 93°44′48″W
- Area: 1.5 acres (0.61 ha)
- Built: 1925
- Architect: Jones, Roessle, Olschner, and Wiener; Julian Sokoloski
- Architectural style: Renaissance, Romanesque, Byzantine
- NRHP reference No.: 89001042
- Added to NRHP: August 7, 1989

Kings Highway Christian Church is a historic Disciples of Christ church in Shreveport, Louisiana. Kings Highway Christian Church was established on May 20, 1923. Kings Highway Christian Church is also nearby C.E. Byrd High School.

The Renaissance/Romanesque/Byzantine style building was constructed in 1925 and added to the National Register of Historic Places in 1989.

== History ==
Kings Highway Christian Church (also known as KHCC) was formed in 1923 by members of Shreveport's Central Christian Church, who had purchased land at the corner of Kings Highway & Line Avenue. Shortly thereafter Jewish Architect Mr. Samuel Wiener, taking inspiration from many Romanesque/Byzantine style churches in and around the City of Rome, designed the beautiful cruciform sanctuary that stands today. The sanctuary was completed in 1925. The Education Building & Wedding Chapel were added in the 1940s, followed by The Elizabeth Stewart Strange Children's Education Building in the late 60's. The most recent addition being The Family Life Center was built in late 1990s.

== Architecture ==
The architecture of the sanctuary, as noted above, is Romanesque/Byzantine in style and cruciform in form; when viewed from above or in floor plan, the sanctuary forms the shape of a cross. Mr. Wiener and the construction crew masonry to signs of the Holy Trinity & man's relationship with God in the marble artwork. Every arch in the eve-line is different, no two are alike, just as no two people are the same. The top of the roof just above the main entrance is adorned with the tree of life instead of a cross. The rafters in the ceiling are placed in a way reminiscent of Noah's Ark.

== See also ==
- Shreveport Municipal Auditorium also designed by Samuel Wiener
- National Register of Historic Places listings in Caddo Parish, Louisiana
