= B'nai Zion Temple =

Reform synagogue in New Orleans, Louisiana, United States

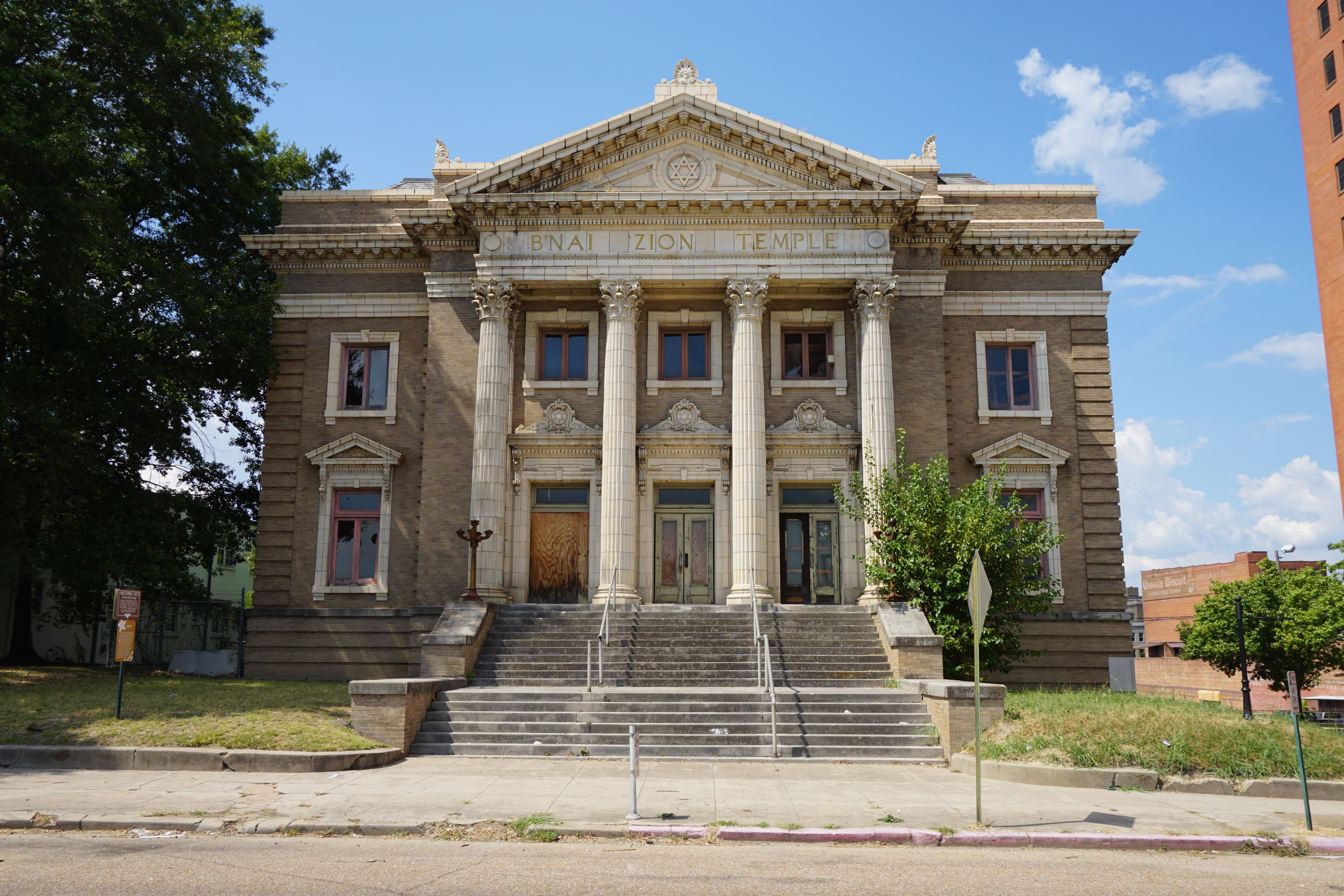
- B'nai Zion Temple, in 2015

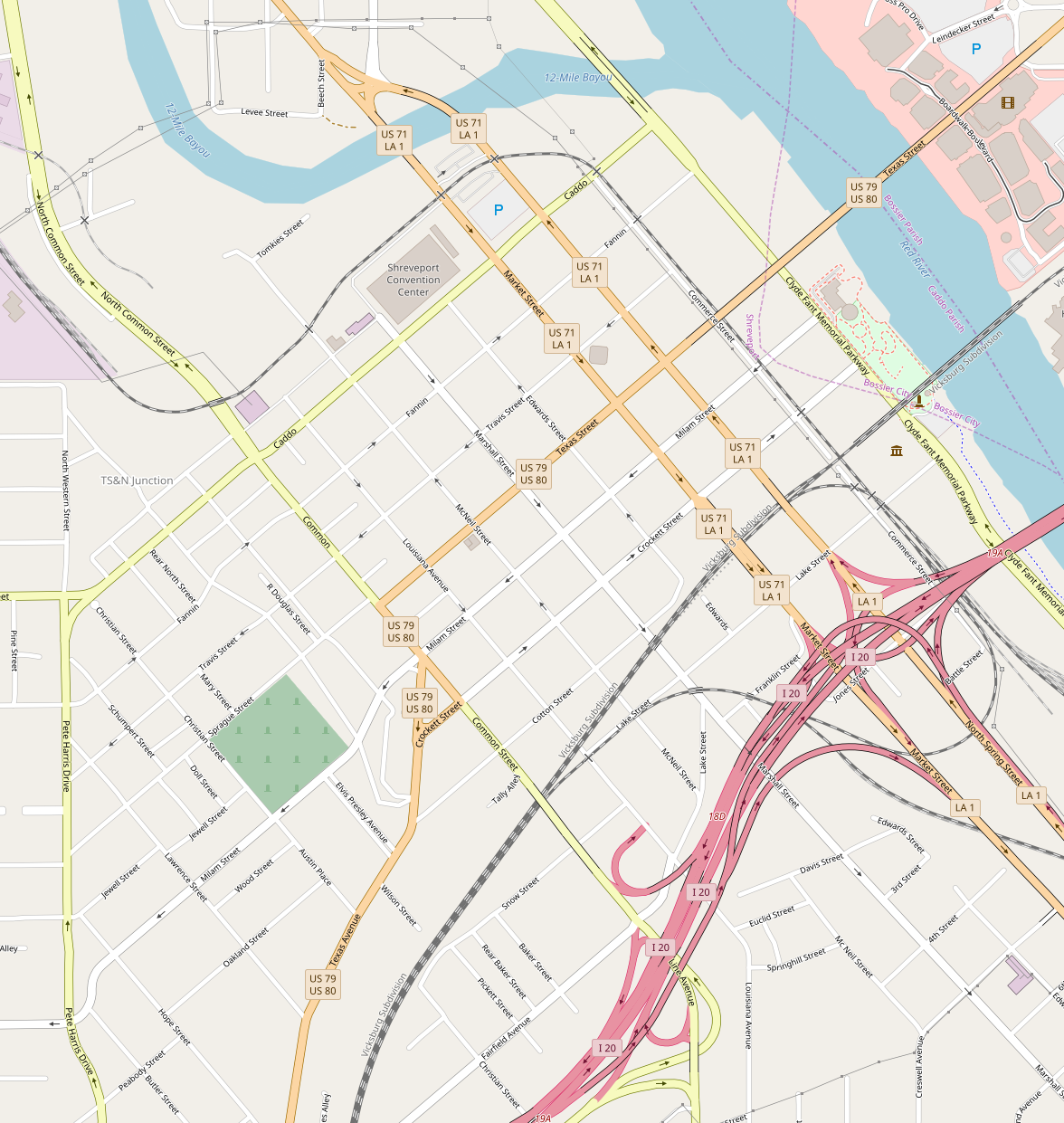
- Location in Shreveport, Louisiana

Religion
- Affiliation: Reform Judaism
- Ecclesiastical or organizational status: Synagogue
- Status: Active

Location
- Location: 802 Cotton Street, Shreveport, Louisiana
- Country: United States
- Interactive map of B'nai Zion Temple
- Coordinates: 32°30′30″N 93°45′02″W

Architecture
- Architects: Edward F. Neild & Clarence Olschner
- Type: Synagogue
- Style: Beaux Arts
- Established: 1861 (as a congregation)
- Completed: 1915

Website
- bnaizioncongregation.or
- B'nai Zion Temple
- U.S. National Register of Historic Places
- U.S. Historic district – Contributing property
- Area: 0.3 acres (0.12 ha)
- Part of: Shreveport Commercial Historic District (ID82002760)
- NRHP reference No.: 93001547

Significant dates
- Added to NRHP: January 21, 1994
- Designated CP: May 16, 1997

B'nai Zion Temple is a historic Jewish synagogue located in downtown Shreveport, Louisiana. It was constructed in 1914 and dedicated in 1915.

== History ==
The Jewish community of Shreveport started off small in the late 1840s. By 1857 a small congregation of Jews had been created. They met in one of the congregant's homes under the leadership of Rabbi Julius Lewin. In 1861 the congregation adopted the name Har-el and started attending services in the home of a local Jewish businessman. At that time, most members of the congregation identified with the Reform tradition of Judaism. Once the Civil War was over, the group became known as Hebrew Zion.

In 1869 the congregation constructed its first building of worship on Fannin Street. In 1875 a disagreement about the religious traditions of Judaism triggered a split in the congregation. A new Orthodox congregation was formed but the split was short lived. In 1877, the two groups reconciled and agreed to become identified with the Reform tradition of Judaism.

By 1910 the Fannin Street building was above capacity, with over 150 members belonging to the Hebrew Zion congregation. By 1910, plans to construct a new temple were being devised. In 1915, the Beaux-Arts building was dedicated and the congregation was renamed B'Nai Zion. The building was seen as "an architectural gem and an ornament to the city." Shortly after the end of World War II, the temple had over 300 members.

In 1955 the congregation had relocated to a new building on Southfield Road. By 1962, membership was above 400 people. After the relocation, the building was sold to the Knights of Columbus. In 1993 the building was bought by a private historical group who planned to preserve the building for its beautiful architecture. The historic structure is now vacant. It was added to the National Register of Historic Places in 1994.

The building also became a contributing property of Shreveport Commercial Historic District when its boundaries were increased on May 16, 1997.

== See also ==
- National Register of Historic Places listings in Caddo Parish, Louisiana
