= Central Fire Station (Shreveport, Louisiana) =

- U.S. National Register of Historic Places
- U.S. Historic district – Contributing property
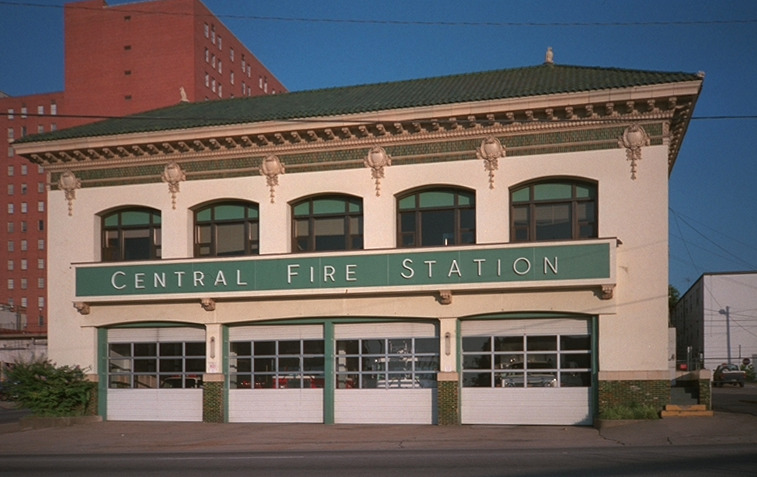

- Location within Louisiana
- Location: 801 Crockett St., Shreveport, Louisiana
- Coordinates: 32°30′32″N 93°45′03″W
- Area: less than one acre
- Built: 1922
- Built by: Werner, W.H.
- Architect: King, Clarence W.
- Architectural style: Beaux Arts, Renaissance, Italian Renaissance
- Part of: Shreveport Commercial Historic District
- NRHP reference No.: 91000625
- Added to NRHP: May 28, 1991

The Central Fire Station in Shreveport, Louisiana, at 801 Crockett St., was built in 1922. It was listed on the National Register of Historic Places in 1991. The listing included two contributing buildings.

It is a two-story stuccoed brick building. It has Beaux Arts styling including "a watertable composed of green glazed bricks surmounted by a cast concrete band and a series of prominent cartouches mounted at the entablature level along the main facade and on the building's corners."

A second contributing resource on the property is a five-story hose tower.

It was designed by architect Clarence W. King and built by contractor W.H. Werner.

It has hosted the Shreveport Regional Arts Council.

It is also a contributing property of the Shreveport Commercial Historic District since its first boundary increase on May 16, 1997.

== See also ==
- Shreveport Fire Station No. 8
- Shreveport Fire Station No. 10
- National Register of Historic Places listings in Caddo Parish, Louisiana
