= Antioch Baptist Church (Shreveport, Louisiana) =

Historic church in Louisiana, United States

- U.S. National Register of Historic Places
- U.S. Historic district – Contributing property
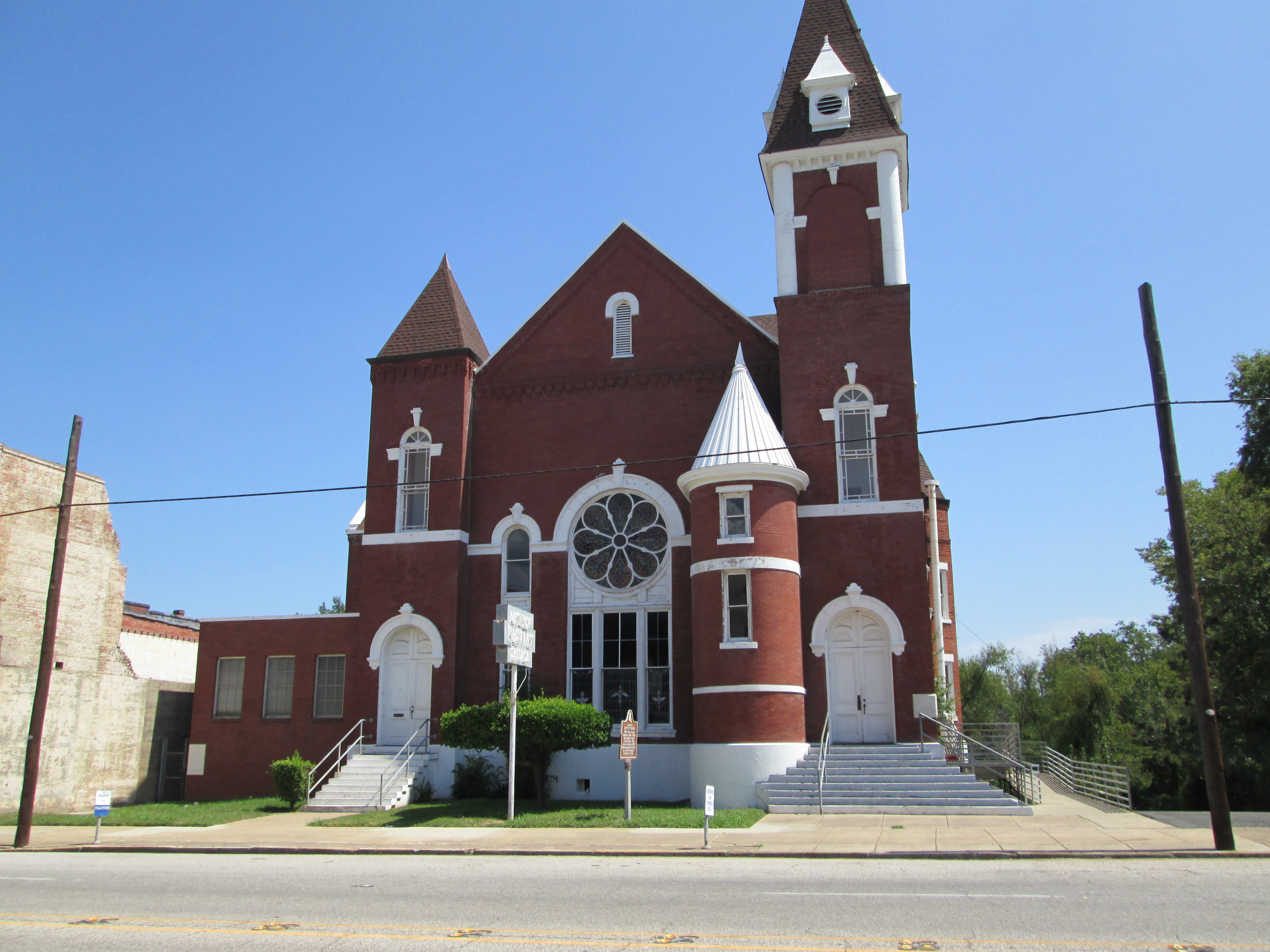

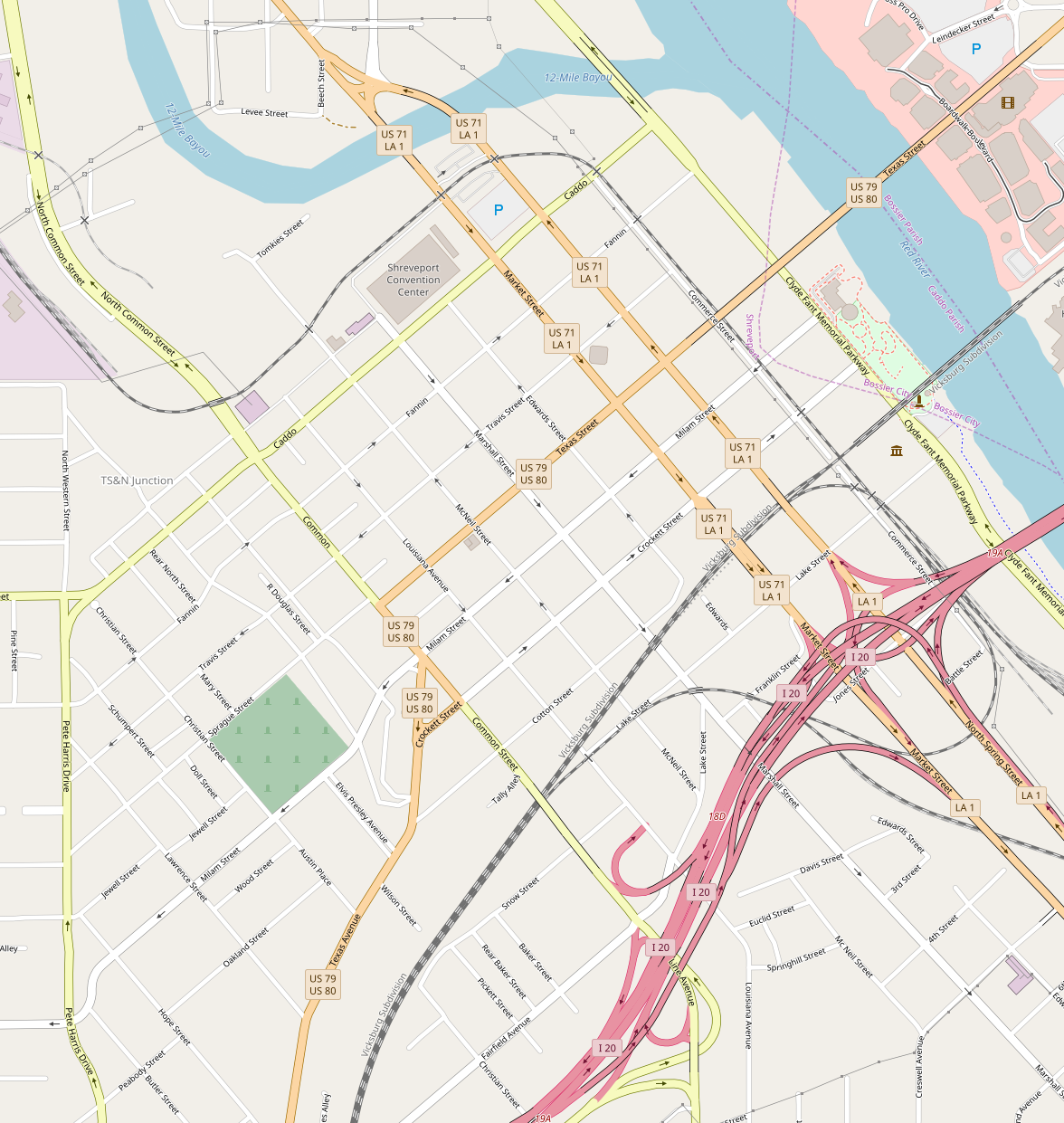
- Location within Shreveport Downtown
- Location: 1057 Texas Avenue; Shreveport, Louisiana
- Coordinates: 32°30′14″N 93°45′13″W
- Area: 0.3 acres (0.12 ha)
- Built: 1903
- Architect: Nathanial Sykes Allen
- Architectural style: Romanesque Revival
- Part of: St. Paul's Bottoms (ID84000033)
- NRHP reference No.: 82000431

Significant dates
- Designated NRHP: November 1, 1982
- Designated CP: July 9, 1999

Antioch Baptist Church (French: Église baptiste d'Antioche) is a historic church located in Shreveport, Louisiana.

On April 23, 1866, two leaders of the First Baptist Church honorably dismissed 73 black members of its church so they could begin construction of a new black, Baptist church. This church came to be known as the First Colored Baptist Church of Shreveport. The original building was dedicated on August 18, 1871. In the late 1800s, the church bought land on Texas Avenue and began construction of a new church. As the church was being built, a storm destroyed the entire structure. The leaders of the First Colored Baptist Church decided to rebuild the structure at a cost of $3,198.45. This new church, designed by Nathaniel Sykes Allen, was dedicated at 1057 Texas Avenue in 1903. Soon after its dedication, the church was renamed Union Missionary Baptist Church. Finally, the church was renamed once more, to Antioch Baptist Church.

The structure is built of red brick and white trim. The church became a member of the National Baptist Convention, USA, Inc. in 1906. The church has been renovated two times since its original dedication, in 1943 and 1958 respectively. The church was added to the National Register of Historic Places in 1982.

The church also became a contributing property of St. Paul's Bottoms historic district when its boundaries were increased on July 9, 1999.

== See also ==
- National Register of Historic Places listings in Caddo Parish, Louisiana
