= Petroleum Tower =

- U.S. National Register of Historic Places
- U.S. Historic district – Contributing property
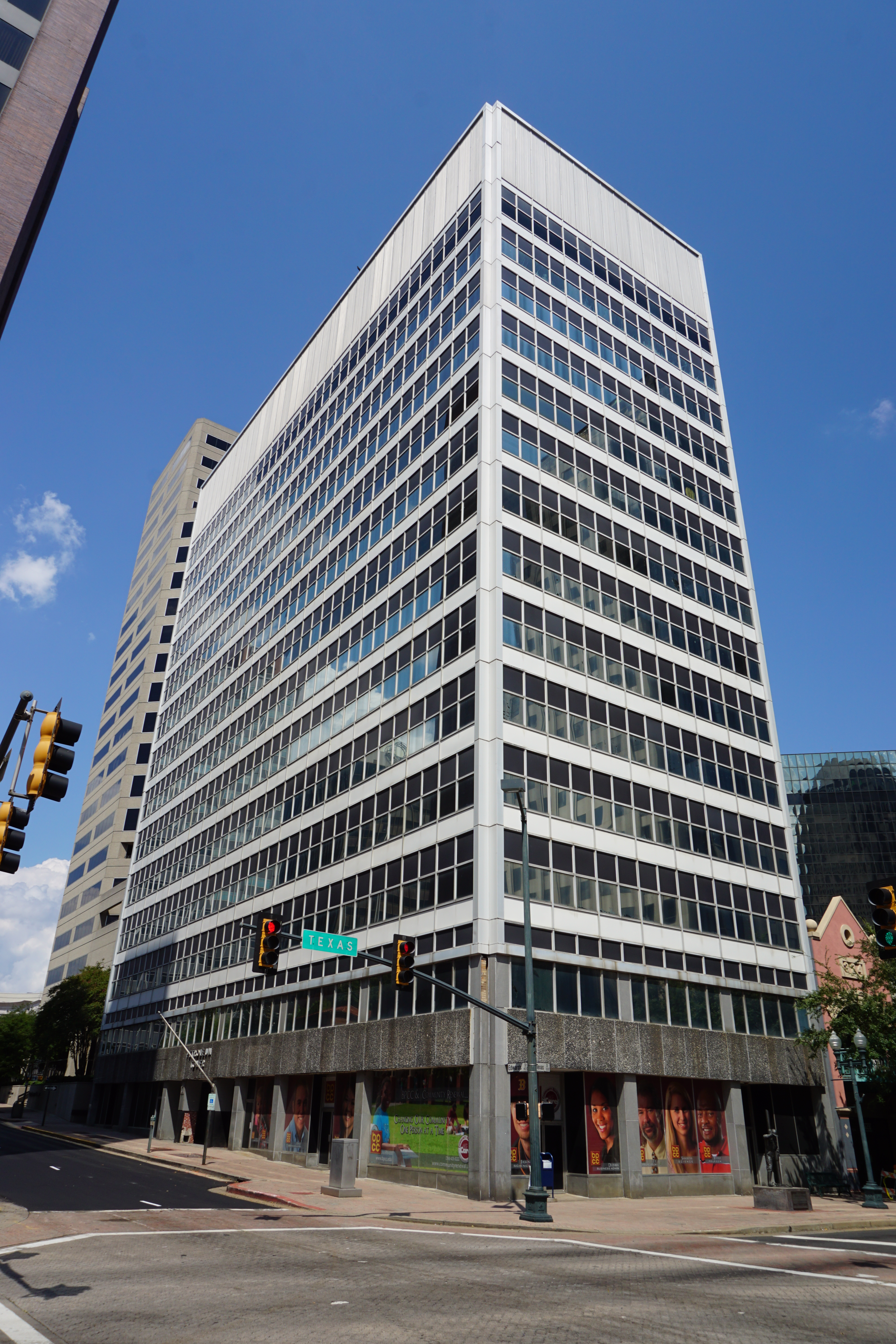
- Building in 2015

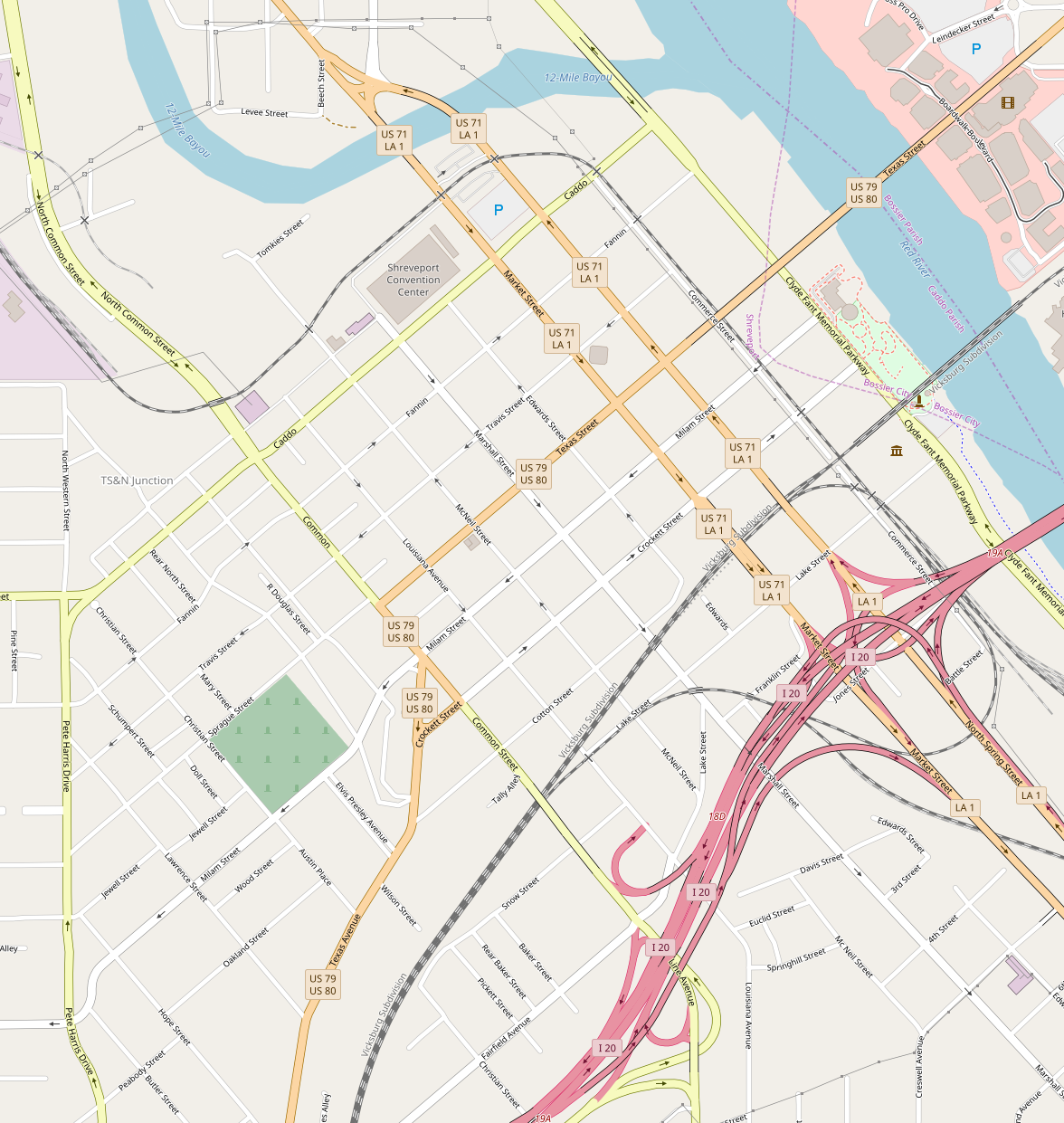
- Location within Shreveport Downtown
- Location: 425 Edwards Street; Shreveport, Louisiana
- Coordinates: 32°30′50″N 93°44′56″W
- Area: less than one acre
- Built: 1958-59
- Architect: Hedrick and Stanley
- Architectural style: International
- Part of: Shreveport Commercial Historic District (ID82002760)
- NRHP reference No.: 13000730

Significant dates
- Added to NRHP: September 17, 2013
- Designated CP: March 11, 1982

The Petroleum Tower is a 16-story high-rise office building located at 425 Edwards Street at the corner of Texas Street and Edwards Street in Shreveport, Louisiana. It stands at a height of 187 feet, making it currently the seventh-tallest building in Shreveport. It was completed in 1959, and is listed on the National Register of Historic Places.

== History ==
The building was opened in 1959 and was a functioning office building until it was abandoned in the 1980s. It was subsequently unoccupied and was left in disrepair until it was donated to Shreveport-Bossier Community Renewal in 2001. In 2006, plans were made public to convert the building into the National Center for Community Renewal, a $62 million project which would have significantly altered the building's design. Then, in 2014, it was announced that it would be converted into 130 apartments, with the street floor being occupied by retail space.

Because of the period during which it was constructed, as well as its representation of a commodity that has been the lifeblood of the region for many decades, the building became a contributing property of Shreveport Commercial Historic District at the time of its creation on March 11, 1982.

On September 17, 2013, the building was also individually enlisted in the National Register of Historic Places.

== Design and construction ==
The building has a length of 150 feet, and a width of 60 feet. From the 2nd Floor to the 14th Floor, the facade of the building is a curtain wall consisting of glass panels separated by narrow light gray aluminum panels. Floors 15 and 16 are windowless and function as mechanical floors, characterized by the aluminum vents near the top of the building. The north, south and west facades of the building have curtain walls, while the east facade is a windowless masonry wall.

The straight angles and boxy appearance of the buildings exterior is a common element of the international-style architecture that defines the Petroleum Tower. One of the most unique characteristics of the building that makes it stand out from the buildings around it is that it was built during the post-war era. Construction began in 1958 and was completed in 1959.

The building was designed by the now-liquidated Texas-based architecture firm Hedrick & Stanley, whose principals were Wyatt C. Hedrick and Thomas D. Stanley. It is one of only six listed projects built by this particular firm.

== See also ==
- National Register of Historic Places listings in Caddo Parish, Louisiana
