= Mooretown, Shreveport, Louisiana =

Coordinates: 32.460°N 93.806°W

Mooretown (also known as Motown by many of its residents) is a neighborhood within the city limits of Shreveport, Louisiana, United States. It is located approximately 5 miles West of downtown. At one time, Mooretown was an independent town, formed in the early 1900s by a group of African-Americans led by Giles D. Moore. They formed a completely African-American community outside Shreveport.

When the city of Shreveport grew, soon after the end of World War II it annexed Mooretown into the city limits.

Residents, including prominent persons, were buried at Zion Rest Cemetery.

== See also ==
- St. Paul's Bottoms, a historically African American neighborhood in Shreveport
