= Shreveport Fire Station No. 8 =

- Shreveport Fire Station #8
- U.S. National Register of Historic Places
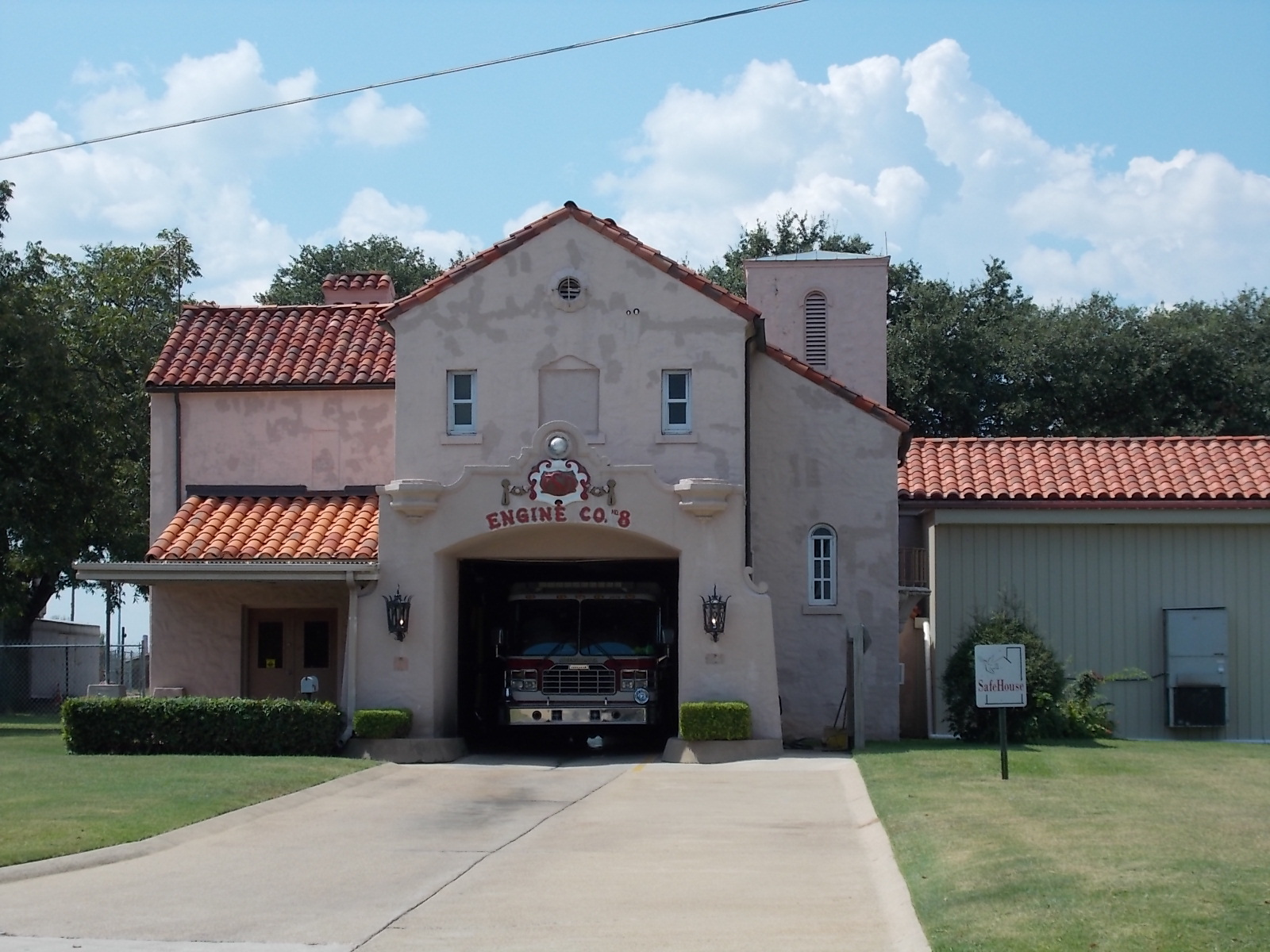

- Location within Louisiana
- Location: 3406 Velva St., Shreveport, Louisiana
- Coordinates: 32°28′49″N 93°46′54″W
- Area: 1 acre (0.40 ha)
- Built: 1925
- Architect: King, Clarence
- Architectural style: Spanish Colonial Revival
- NRHP reference No.: 00000683
- Added to NRHP: June 30, 2000

The Shreveport Fire Station #8, at 3406 Velva St. in Shreveport, Louisiana, was built in 1925. Also known as the Velva Street Station, it was listed on the National Register of Historic Places in 2000.

It is a two-story stuccoed Spanish Colonial Revival-style building, and has a red tile roof. It was designed by architect Clarence W. King.

The land was given to local Willis Knighton hospital as part of a land swap, and is no longer used to store active firefighting equipment.

== See also ==
- Central Fire Station (Shreveport, Louisiana)
- Shreveport Fire Station No. 10
- National Register of Historic Places listings in Caddo Parish, Louisiana
