= A. C. Steere Elementary School =

A.C. Steere Elementary
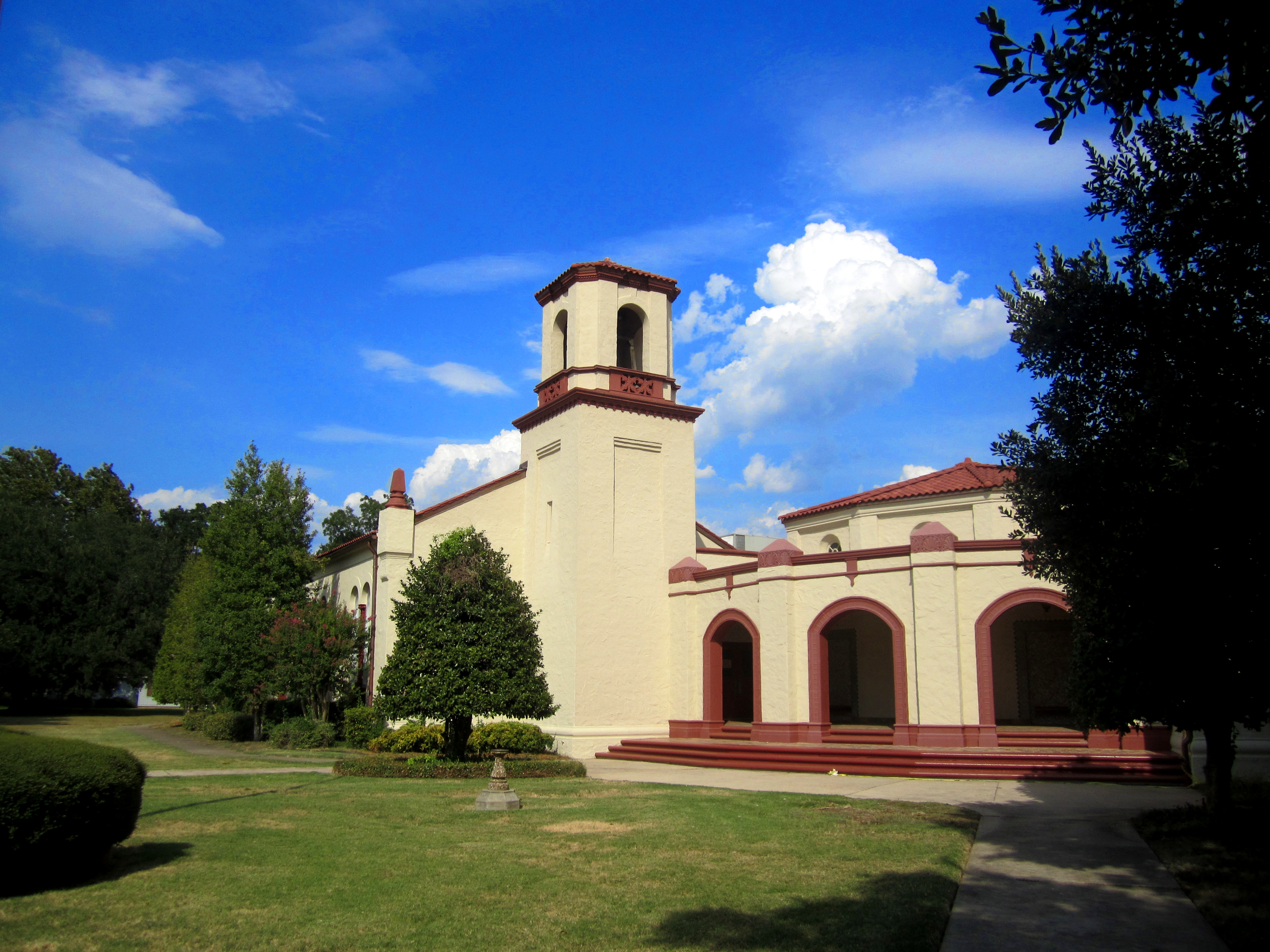
- A.C. Steere Elementary on August 15, 2011

Location
- 4009 Youree Drive; Shreveport, LA 71105; United States; 32°28′01″N 93°43′18″W

Information
- School type: Public Elementary
- Established: 1929
- School district: Caddo
- Principal: Brandy Holcomb
- Grades: PreK - Fifth Grade
- Gender: Co-Ed
- Age range: 4-12
- Enrollment: 500
- Campus size: 17 acres
- Colors: Green & Gold
- Mascot: Gators
- Newspaper: Gator Gazette (monthly)
- Website: http://acsteere.net/; www.acspta.org
- A.C. Steere Elementary School
- U.S. National Register of Historic Places
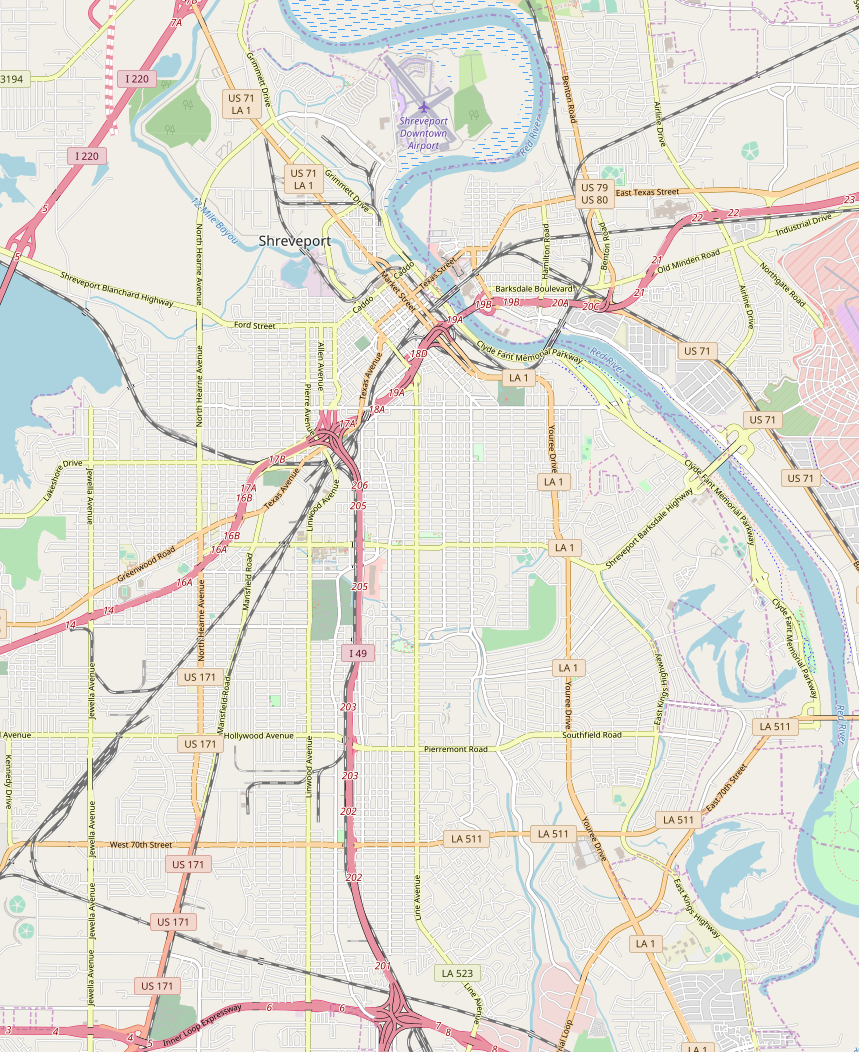
- Location within Shreveport Location within Louisiana
- Location: 4009 Youree Drive, Shreveport, Louisiana
- Coordinates: 32°28′01″N 93°43′18″W
- Area: 1.75 acres (0.71 ha)
- Built: 1929
- Architect: Edward Fairfax Neild
- Architectural style: Mission/Spanish Revival
- NRHP reference No.: 91000074
- Added to NRHP: February 20, 1991

A. C. Steere Elementary School, formerly Broadmoor School, is an elementary school located at 4009 Youree Drive in Shreveport, Louisiana, and operated under the direction of the Caddo Parish school board.

== History ==
It opened its doors Oct. 29, 1929 as the new Broadmoor School, previously located at 305 Albany Ave. The new school housed 225 students and 12 teachers. The school flower was the yellow and green dandelion, which is believed to be the source of the school's colors. In the mid-1920s, A.C. Steere donated 12–17 acres of land in Broadmoor for schools and recreational parks. Following his death in 1930, the Broadmoor School was renamed in honor of the man whose contributions made it possible. The east wing, with four classrooms and a central office was added to the original school structure in 1939. In 1954, A.C. Steere's enrollment topped out at 1,078 with classes housed in permanent classrooms, temporary buildings and borrowed space from Broadmoor Baptist Church. Renovations and additions in 2010 updated the campus structures, with a central air and heating system and new Library/Media Center. Also in 2010, the title to the domed gymnasium that formerly belonged to Shreveport Parks and Recreation was accepted by Caddo Parish School Board and became a permanent part of the school campus. Sixth-grade classes were moved to Broadmoor Junior High in 1982.

On Dec. 3, 1936, the A.C. Steere Parent Teacher Association was chartered under the Louisiana Parent Teacher Association, which was then a branch of the National Congress of Parents and Teachers. In 2011, the PTA will celebrated its Diamond Anniversary, 75 years as a unit in good standing. It is the longest standing active elementary school PTA unit in Caddo Parish. Programs introduced to the school through PTA efforts include Accelerated Reader, Watch DOGS and National Elementary Honor Society.

On Feb. 20, 1991, A.C. Steere was named to the National Register of Historic Places because of the significance of its architecture. Renovations in 2010-2011 restored the clay roof tiles and copper gutters to their original state. The school's bell tower houses the bell from the USS Shreveport, a Tacoma-class frigate of the United States Navy.

== See also ==
- National Register of Historic Places listings in Caddo Parish, Louisiana
