= History of Shreveport, Louisiana =

Shreve Town was originally contained within the boundaries of a section of land sold to the company by the indigenous Caddo Indians in the year of 1835, during the period of Indian Removal. In 1838, Caddo Parish was created from the large Natchitoches Parish and Shreve Town was designated as the parish seat. Shreveport remains the parish seat of Caddo Parish today. On March 20, 1839, the town was incorporated as "Shreveport".

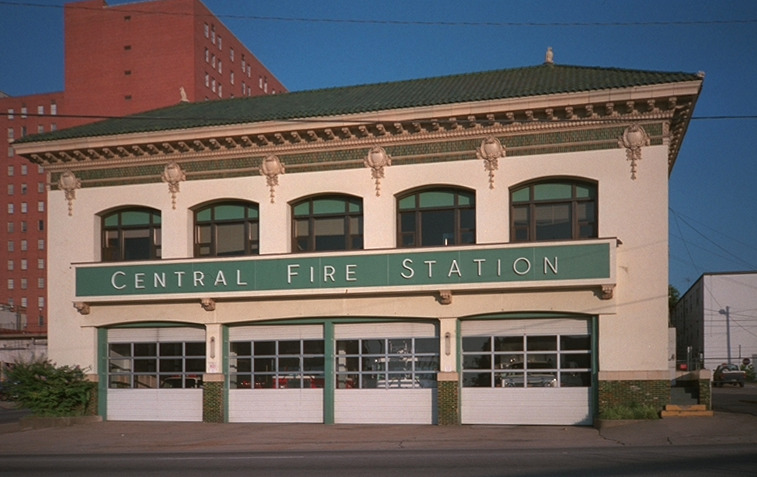
Central Fire Station downtown

== 1900 to present ==
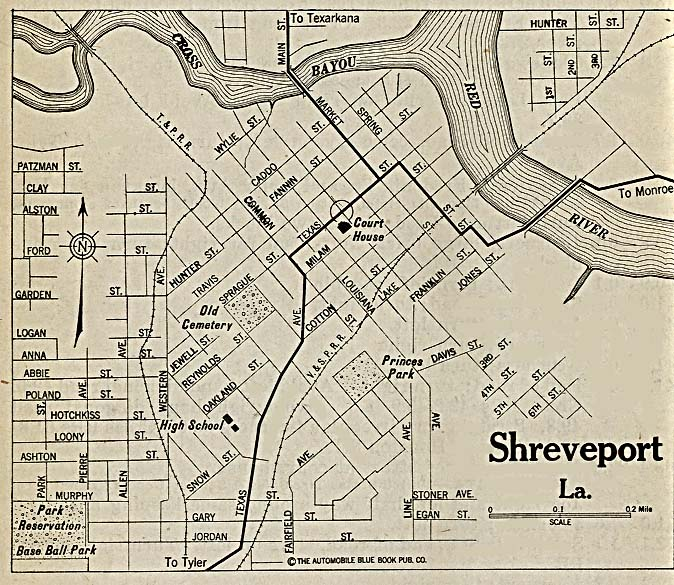
Shreveport in 1920

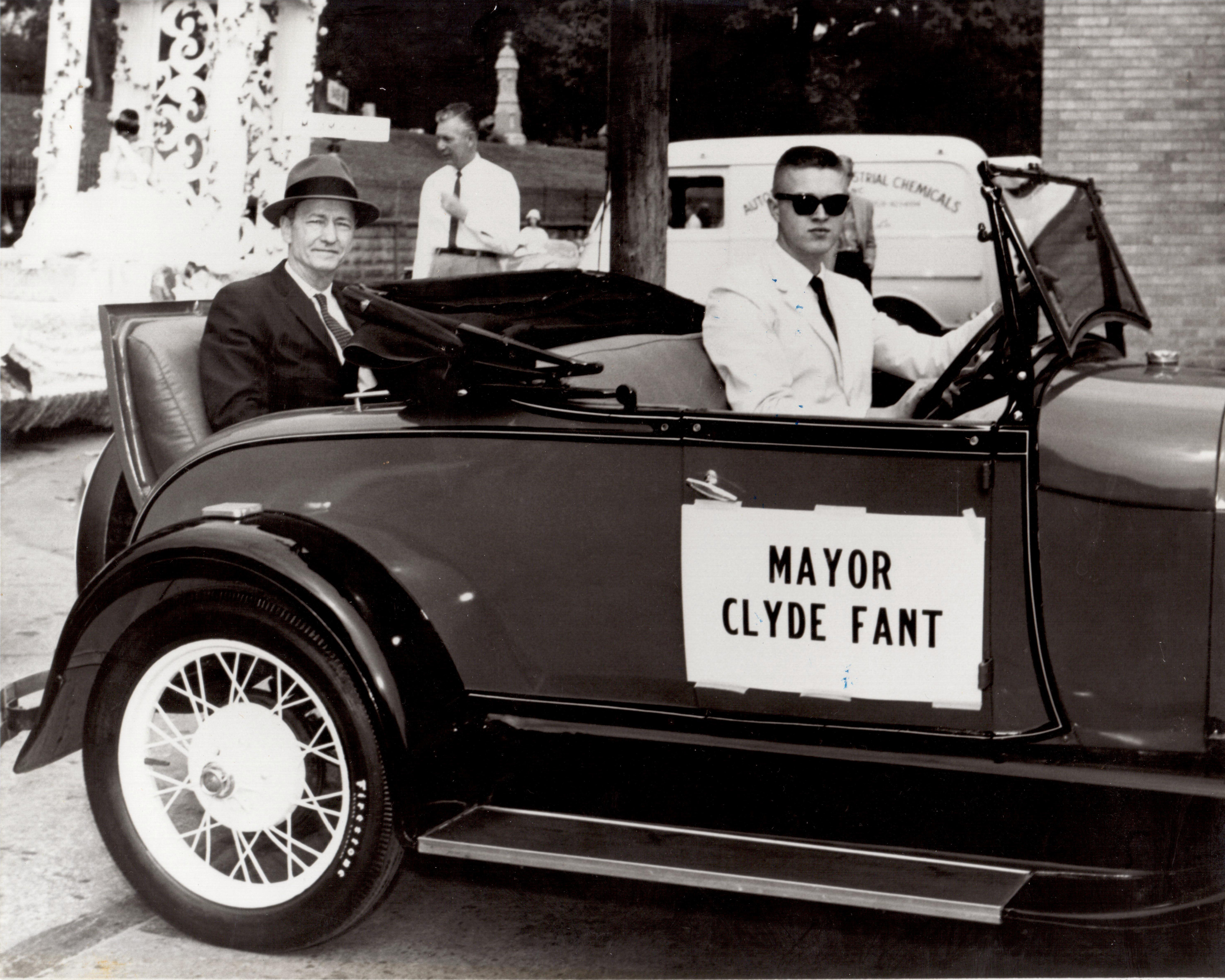
Mayor Clyde Fant in the Holiday in Dixie Parade, 1962

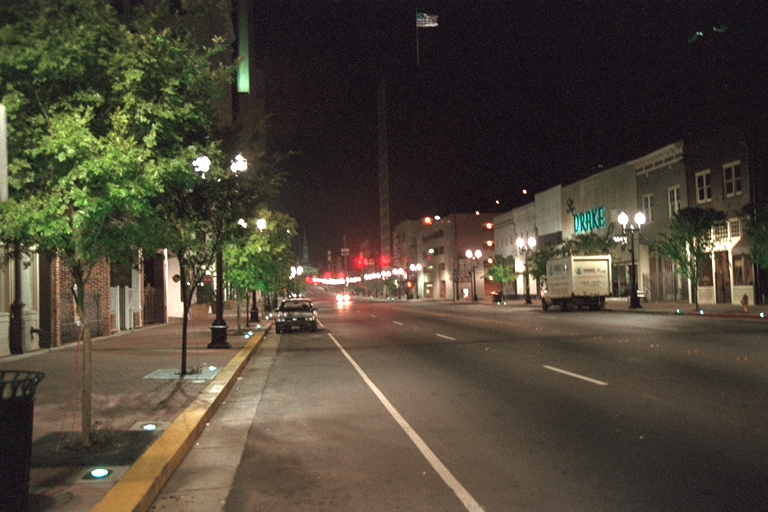
Downtown Shreveport at night, showing Streetscape-enhanced sidewalks.

Shreveport was home to the Louisiana Hayride, a radio broadcast from the city's Municipal Auditorium. During its heyday from 1948 to 1960, it featured musicians who became noted nationally, such as Hank Williams, Sr., and Elvis Presley (who got his start at this venue).

The city and region suffered during and after the decline of the oil business. Both blacks and whites lost good-paying work, and many people left. After the third black man had been fatally shot by whites within a few months, on September 23–24, 1988, there was rioting in black neighborhoods after charges were reduced for a defendant in a case of a young white woman fatally shooting a David McKinney, a black man who appeared to be an innocent bystander.

Since the downturn in the oil industry and other economic problems, the city has struggled with a declining population, unemployment, poverty, drugs and violent crime. City data from 2017 showed a dramatic increase in certain violent crimes from the previous year, including a 138 percent increase in homicides, a 21 percent increase in forcible rapes and more than 130 percent increases in both business armed robberies and business burglaries. In 2018 the local government and police authorities reported a crime drop in most categories; it was part of an overall reduction in crime since the late 20th century. In late 2018, Shreveport was named the "worst place to live in Louisiana" and in 2019, the worst place to start a career.

On January 16, 2020, Advanced Aero Services planned to open a facility at Shreveport Regional Airport, with an estimated 1,000 jobs by the end of the decade.

In March 2020, Shreveport was named the fourth-fastest shrinking city by the 24/7 Wall St. online magazine.

On June 19, 2020 rapper Hurricane Chris was arrested in Shreveport for second degree murder. In July 2020, information alleging corruption in the Mayor Adrian Perkins administration was leaked. A Shreveport Police officer was also placed on leave regarding comments of the George Floyd killing in Minnesota.

== See also ==
- Timeline of Shreveport, Louisiana
