= United States Post Office and Courthouse (Shreveport, Louisiana) =

- U.S. Post Office and Courthouse
- U.S. National Register of Historic Places
- U.S. Historic district – Contributing property
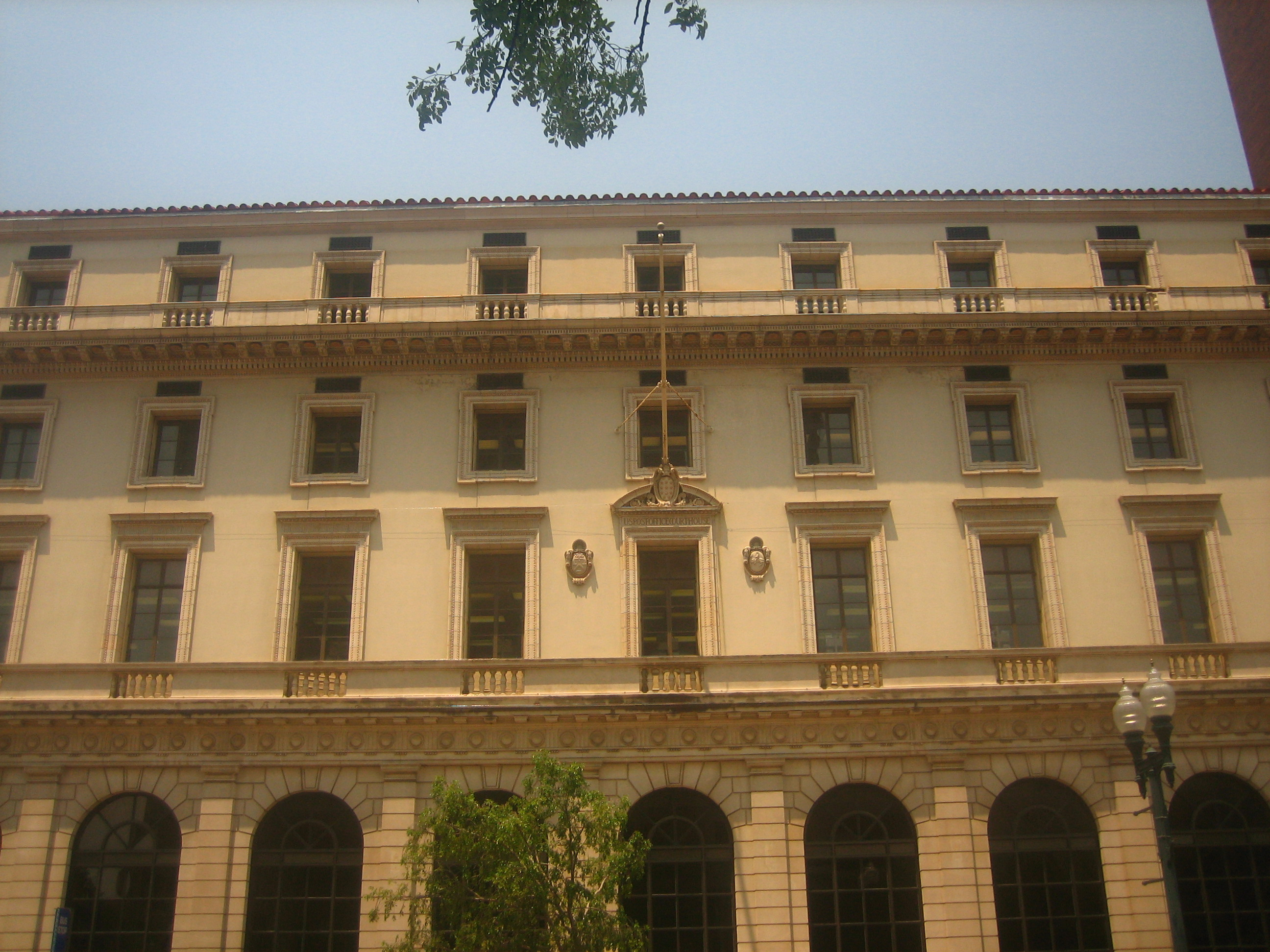
- The building in August 2008

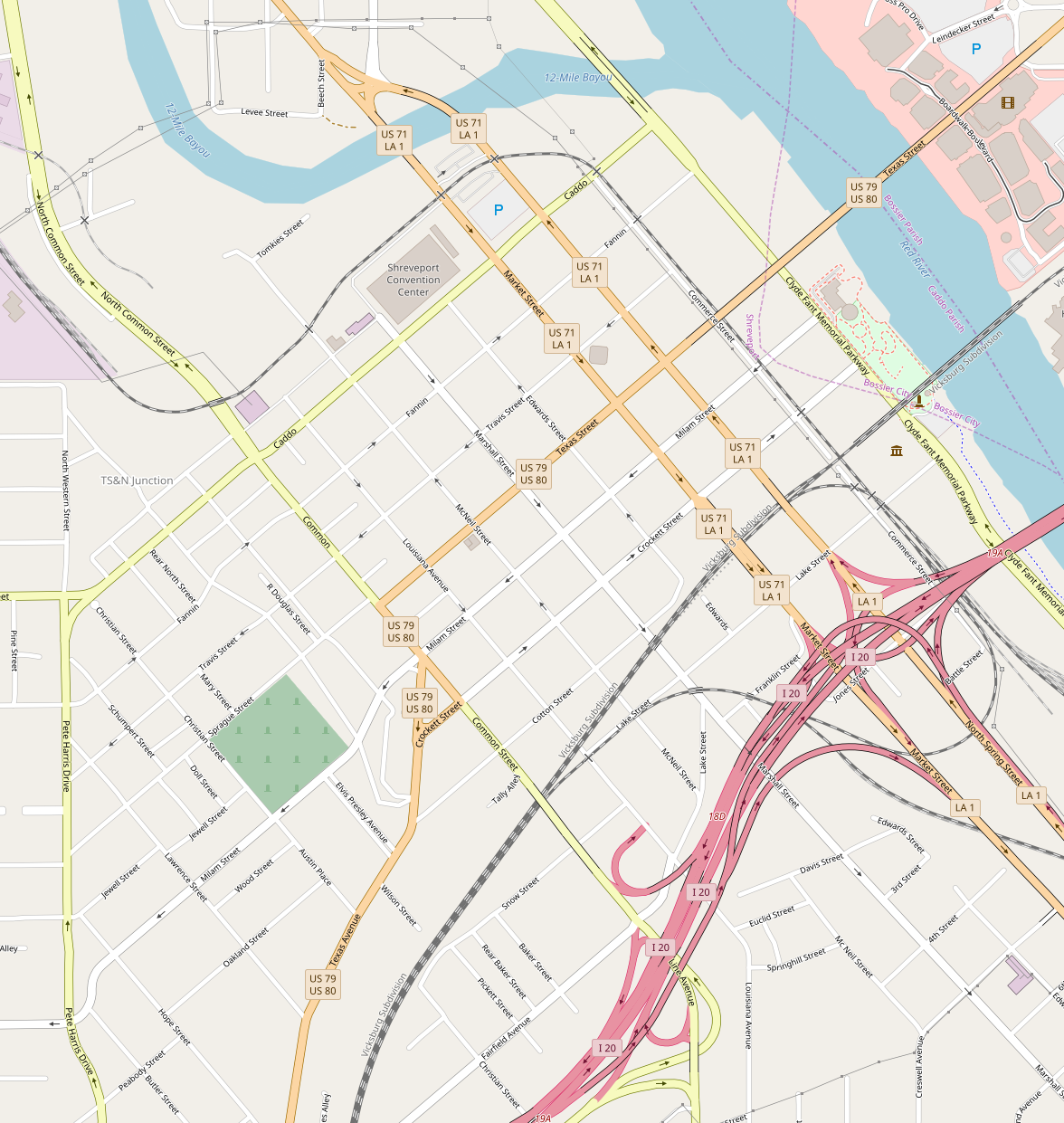
- Location within Shreveport Downtown
- Location: 424 Texas Street, Shreveport, Louisiana
- Coordinates: 32°30′48″N 93°44′59″W
- Area: less than one acre
- Built: 1910
- Architect: James K. Taylor, James A. Wetmore
- Architectural style: Italian Renaissance
- Part of: Shreveport Commercial Historic District (ID82002760)
- NRHP reference No.: 74000920

Significant dates
- Added to NRHP: September 12, 1974
- Designated CP: March 11, 1982

The U.S. Post Office and Courthouse in Shreveport, Louisiana, was built in 1910. It was designed in Italian Renaissance architecture style by James K. Taylor and James A. Wetmore. It served historically as a courthouse and as a post office.

The building was listed on the National Register of Historic Places in 1974 and became a contributing property of Shreveport Commercial Historic District at the time of its creation on March 11, 1982.

In 1974 all federal offices vacated the building. It is currently a branch of the Shreve Memorial Library.

== See also ==
- List of United States post offices
- National Register of Historic Places listings in Caddo Parish, Louisiana
