= Hose House No. 10 =

- U.S. National Register of Historic Places
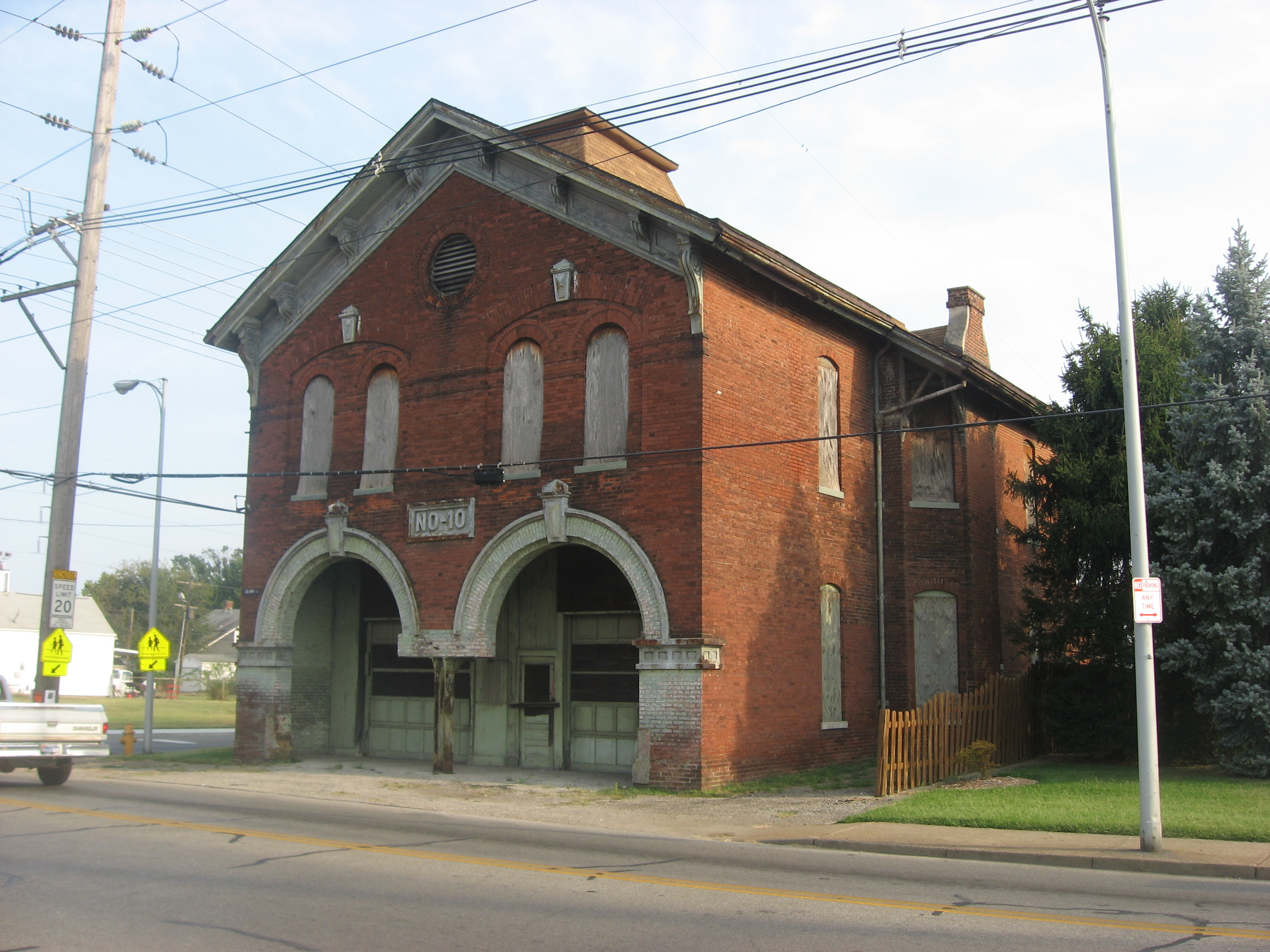
- The view from Columbia St.

- Location within Indiana Location within the United States
- Location: 117 E. Columbia St., Evansville, Indiana
- Coordinates: 37°59′04″N 87°33′41″W
- Built: December 1888
- Architect: Frank J. Schlotter
- Architectural style: Italianate
- NRHP reference No.: 82000099
- Added to NRHP: 11 February 1982

Hose House No. 10, also known as Old Hose House No. 10, is a historic fire station located at Evansville, Indiana. The Italianate style brick structure was built in December 1888 to serve the then-northeast side. A tower attached to the building was removed in 1947. In 1977 the fire department moved to a new station on the opposite side of Columbia Street.

It was added to the National Register of Historic Places in 1982.

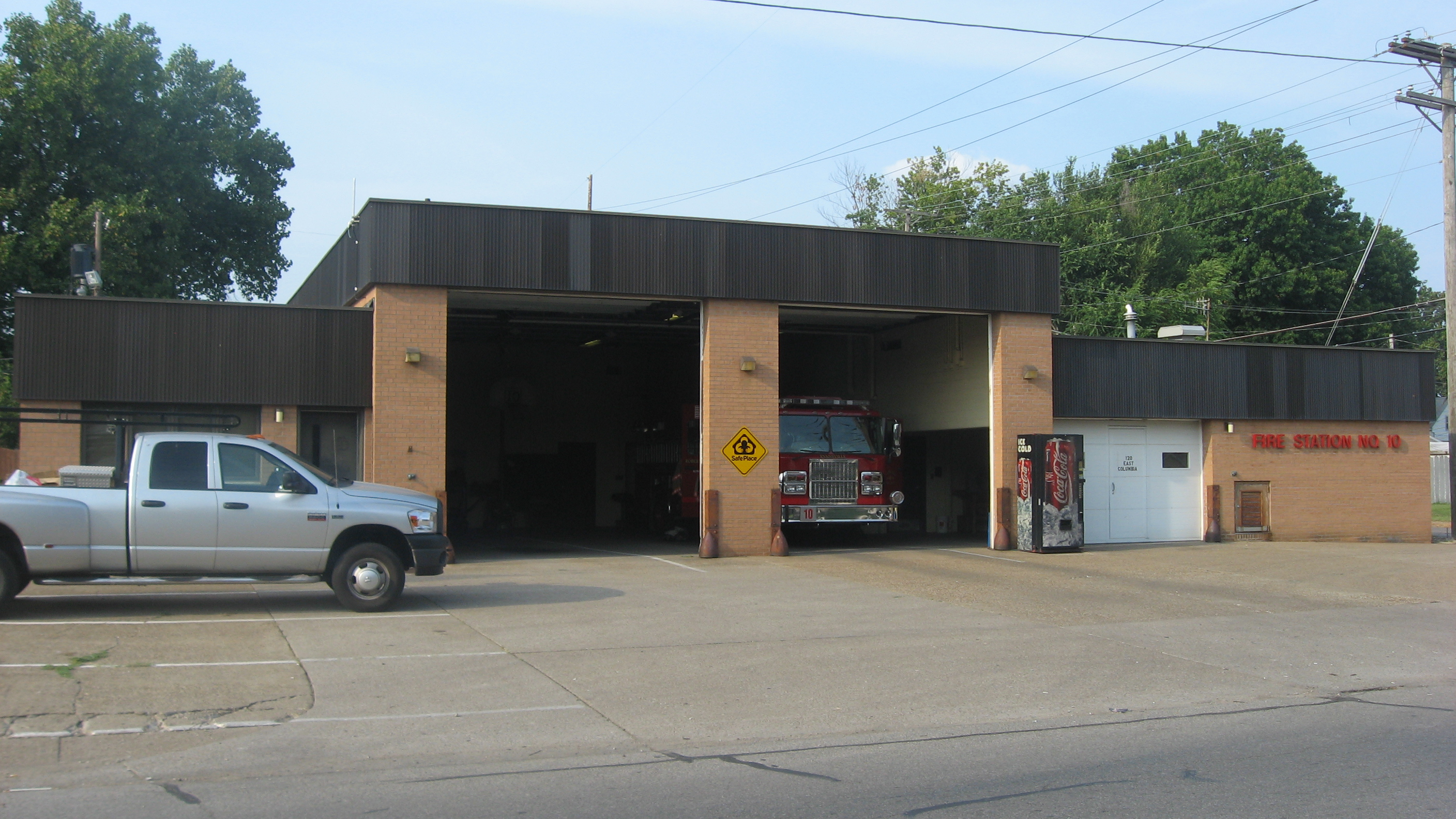
The new Fire Station #10
