= Jefferson Hotel (Shreveport, Louisiana) =

- U.S. National Register of Historic Places
- U.S. Historic district – Contributing property
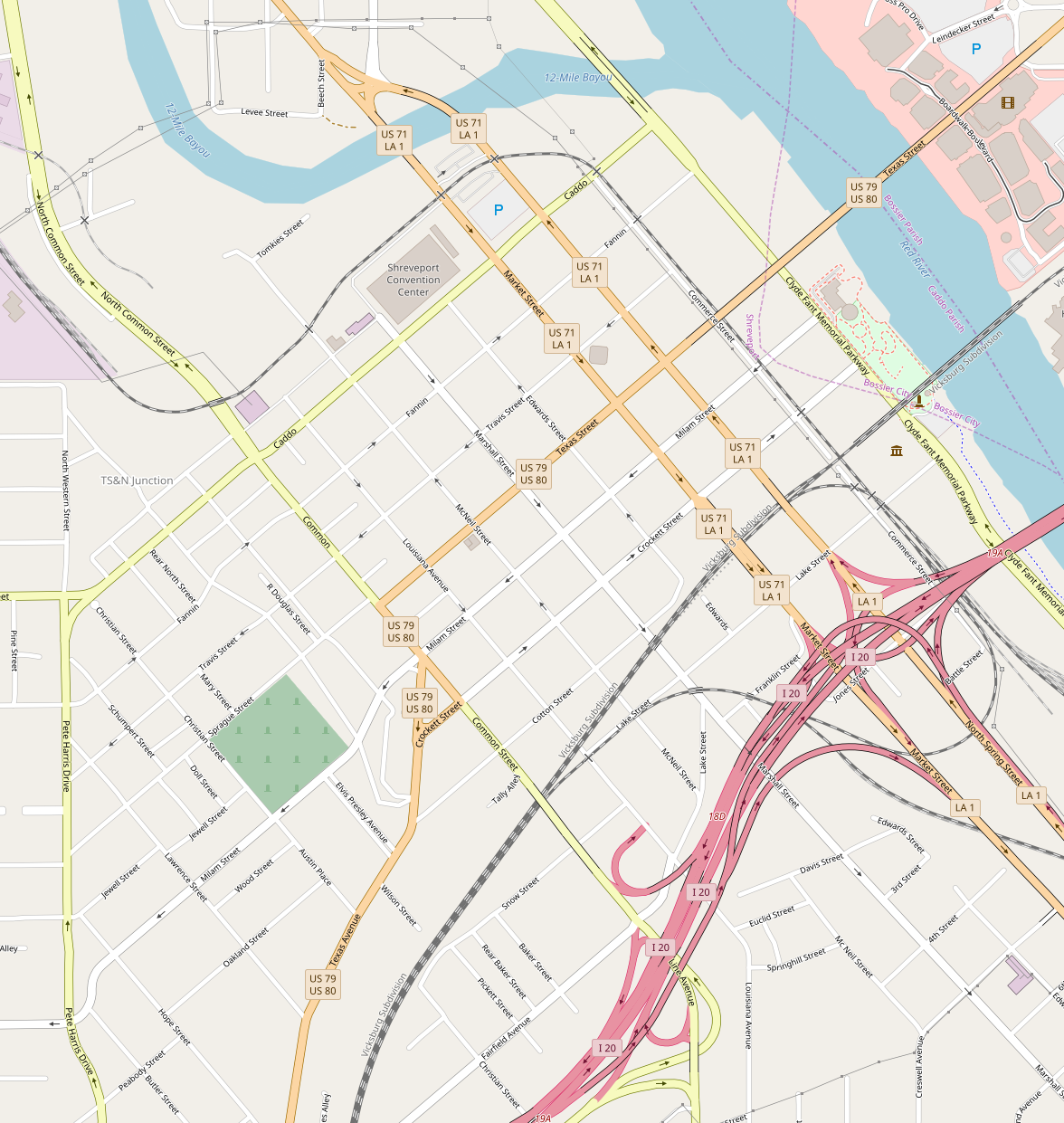
- Location within Shreveport Downtown
- Location: 907 Louisiana Avenue, Shreveport, Louisiana
- Coordinates: 32°30′30″N 93°44′52″W
- Area: less than one acre
- Built: 1922
- Built by: B & T Construction Co.
- Architect: H.E. Schwartz
- Part of: Shreveport Commercial Historic District (ID82002760)
- NRHP reference No.: 89000977

Significant dates
- Designated NRHP: July 27, 1989
- Designated CP: May 16, 1997

The Jefferson Hotel in Shreveport, Louisiana is a four-story brick railway hotel that was built in 1922. It was listed on the National Register of Historic Places in 1989. It also became a contributing property of Shreveport Commercial Historic District when its boundaries were increased on May 16, 1997.

It was designed by architect H.E. Schwartz and served the travelers of Union Depot Station, which was located across the street, until its demolition in 1972. Alterations, particularly to the exterior, have been minimal since its construction.

== See also ==
- National Register of Historic Places listings in Caddo Parish, Louisiana
