= National Register of Historic Places listings in Caddo Parish, Louisiana =

Location of Caddo Parish in Louisiana

This is a list of the National Register of Historic Places listings in Caddo Parish, Louisiana.

This is intended to be a complete list of the properties and districts on the National Register of Historic Places in Caddo Parish, Louisiana, United States. The locations of National Register properties and districts for which the latitude and longitude coordinates are included below, may be seen in a map.

There are 71 properties and districts listed on the National Register in the parish, including 2 National Historic Landmarks. Four properties were once listed, but have since been removed. One listing, the Caddo Parish Confederate Monument, was originally listed in Caddo Parish but has since been relocated to De Soto Parish.

This National Park Service list is complete through NPS recent listings posted October 9, 2026.

== Current listings ==
	Name on the Register	Image	Date listed	Location	City or town	Description
1	Antioch Baptist Church	Antioch Baptist Church	November 1, 1982 (#82000431)	1057 Texas Avenue; 32°30′14″N 93°45′13″W	Shreveport	Also contributing property of St. Paul's Bottoms historic district since its boundary increase on July 9, 1999.
2	B'Nai Zion Temple	B'Nai Zion Temple	January 21, 1994 (#93001547)	802 Cotton Street; 32°30′30″N 93°45′02″W	Shreveport	Also contributing property of Shreveport Commercial Historic District since its first boundary increase on May 16, 1997.
3	Barret Elementary School		April 2, 2025 (#100010961)	2600 Barret Street; 32°29′13″N 93°45′09″W	Shreveport	
4	Bethune Junior-Senior High School	Bethune Junior-Senior High School	February 21, 2018 (#100002113)	4331 Henry Street; 32°27′50″N 93°48′44″W	Shreveport	Part of Caddo Parish Public School System Building Program, 1946-1961 MPS.
5	C. E. Byrd High School	C. E. Byrd High School	June 10, 1991 (#91000704)	3201 Line Avenue; 32°28′49″N 93°44′43″W	Shreveport	
6	Caddo Lake Bridge	Caddo Lake Bridge	October 18, 1996 (#96001166)	Across Caddo Lake, next modern LA 538 bridge 32°41′47″N 93°57′28″W	Mooringsport	
7	Caspiana House	Caspiana House	December 10, 1981 (#81000288)	Pioneer Heritage Center, Louisiana State University campus 32°25′52″N 93°42′11″W	Shreveport	Once was part of the Caspiana Plantation in Caspiana, Caddo Parish.
8	Central Fire Station	Central Fire Station	May 28, 1991 (#91000625)	801 Crockett Street; 32°30′32″N 93°45′03″W	Shreveport	Now hosting the Shreveport Regional Arts Council. Also contributing property of Shreveport Commercial Historic District since its first boundary increase on May 16, 1997.
9	Central High School	Central High School	May 16, 1991 (#91000606)	1627 Weinstock Street; 32°30′02″N 93°45′51″W	Shreveport	Originally known was Central Colored School it later became a junior high and then Central Elementary School
10	Central Railroad Station	Central Railroad Station	May 28, 1991 (#91000622)	1025 Marshall Street; 32°30′32″N 93°44′43″W	Shreveport	Also contributing property of Shreveport Commercial Historic District since its second boundary increase on April 29, 2015.
11	Cross Lake Pumping and Filtration Plant		July 26, 2024 (#100010600)	3205 Blanchard Road; 32°30′19″N 93°47′27″W	Shreveport	
12	Crystal Grocery	Crystal Grocery	March 5, 1998 (#98000181)	1124 Fairfield Avenue; 32°30′12″N 93°45′02″W	Shreveport	Also known as Fertitta's Delicatessen.
13	Davidson House	Davidson House	December 22, 1983 (#83003604)	654 Wichita Street; 32°29′41″N 93°44′37″W	Shreveport	Also contributing property of Highland Historic District.
14	Dodd College President's Home	Dodd College President's Home	July 22, 1982 (#82002758)	601 Ockley Drive; 32°28′07″N 93°44′32″W	Shreveport	
15	Dunn House	Dunn House	December 2, 1998 (#98001423)	9371 Greenwood Road; 32°26′36″N 93°58′29″W	Greenwood	
16	Fair Park High School	Fair Park High School	January 11, 2001 (#00001630)	3222 Greenwood Road; 32°28′45″N 93°47′26″W	Shreveport	
17	The Fairfield Building	The Fairfield Building	September 17, 2013 (#13000729)	1600-1612 Fairfield Avenue; 32°29′49″N 93°45′10″W	Shreveport	
18	Fairfield Historic District	Fairfield Historic District	February 19, 1987 (#87000190)	Fairfield Avenue and adjacent streets, from Olive Street to Kings Highway; 32°29′12″N 93°44′59″W	Shreveport	The 120.6 acres (48.8 ha) historic district comprises 253 contributing properties built between 1900 and 1936. On October 24, 1996, an additional property located at 948 Boulevard Street increased district boundaries.
19	First National Bank Tower		October 16, 2026 (#100013521)	400 Texas Street; 32°30′49″N 93°44′56″W	Shreveport	
20	First Presbyterian Church	First Presbyterian Church	June 15, 2011 (#11000358)	900 Jordan Street; 32°29′55″N 93°44′56″W	Shreveport	
21	Flesch House	Flesch House	June 10, 1991 (#91000703)	415 Sherwood Road; 32°27′09″N 93°44′18″W	Shreveport	
22	Flournoy-Wise House	Flournoy-Wise House	March 16, 1990 (#90000435)	9251 Bois d'Arc Lane; 32°26′30″N 93°58′38″W	Greenwood	Originally at 9152 Bois d'Arc Lane.
23	Forest Home		October 30, 1989 (#89001873)	About 240 yards (220 m) west of Johns Road and Johns Gin Road intersection 32°12′29″N 94°01′31″W	Four Forks	
24	Highland Historic District	Highland Historic District	February 19, 1987 (#87000192)	Roughly bounded by Vine Street, Gilbert Drive, and Topeka Street and Irving Place; also roughly bounded by Stoner Avenue, Centenary Boulevard, Kings Highway, and Line Avenue; 32°29′30″N 93°44′23″W	Shreveport	The 96.8 acres (39.2 ha) historic district comprises 251 contributing properties built between c.1890 and 1933. Second set of boundaries represents an increase of April 17, 2001.
25	Holy Trinity Catholic Church	Holy Trinity Catholic Church	September 27, 1984 (#84001261)	315 Marshall Street; 32°30′52″N 93°45′03″W	Shreveport	Also contributing property of Shreveport Commercial Historic District since its second boundary increase on April 29, 2015.
26	Walter B. Jacobs House		September 19, 2016 (#16000670)	5935 East Ridge Drive; 32°27′09″N 93°44′04″W	Shreveport	
27	Jefferson Hotel		July 27, 1989 (#89000977)	907 Louisiana Avenue; 32°30′30″N 93°44′52″W	Shreveport	Also contributing property of Shreveport Commercial Historic District since its first boundary increase on May 16, 1997.
28	Kansas City Southern Depot	Kansas City Southern Depot	January 20, 1995 (#94001578)	100 North West Front Street; 32°52′19″N 93°59′07″W	Vivian	
29	Kansas City Southern Railroad Bridge, Cross Bayou	Kansas City Southern Railroad Bridge, Cross Bayou	March 23, 1995 (#95000347)	Over Cross Bayou, between North Spring Street bridge and Clyde Fant Memorial Parkway bridge 32°31′10″N 93°45′00″W	Shreveport	
30	Kings Highway Christian Church	Kings Highway Christian Church	August 7, 1989 (#89001042)	806 Kings Highway; 32°28′54″N 93°44′48″W	Shreveport	
31	Lakeside Municipal Golf Course	Lakeside Municipal Golf Course	June 1, 2005 (#05000504)	2200 Milam Street; 32°30′19″N 93°46′40″W	Shreveport	The historic golf course comprises a 38 acres (15 ha) area at northeast corner of Hearne Avenue and Milam Street.
32	Lewis House	Lewis House	July 27, 1979 (#79001054)	675 Jordan Street; 32°29′53″N 93°44′40″W	Shreveport	Also contributing property of Highland Historic District.
33	Col. Robert H. Lindsay House		July 16, 1973 (#73000861)	2803 Woodlawn Avenue; 32°29′04″N 93°43′45″W	Shreveport	Also known as Symphony House and Scofield House.
34	Line Avenue School	Line Avenue School	June 3, 1981 (#81000289)	1800 Line Avenue; 32°29′39″N 93°44′47″W	Shreveport	Building now host Northwestern State University nursing campus.
35	Huey P. Long House	Huey P. Long House	August 15, 1991 (#91001060)	305 Forest Avenue; 32°28′47″N 93°44′11″W	Shreveport	
36	Louisiana State Exhibit Building	Louisiana State Exhibit Building	February 20, 1991 (#91000071)	3015 Greenwood Road; 32°28′48″N 93°47′06″W	Shreveport	
37	Mason House		May 22, 2001 (#01000512)	103 Ardmore Avenue; 32°28′38″N 93°43′06″W	Shreveport	
38	Masonic Temple	Masonic Temple	June 10, 1991 (#91000702)	1805 Creswell Avenue; 32°29′39″N 93°44′29″W	Shreveport	Also contributing property of Highland Historic District.
39	Mooringsport Masonic Lodge		October 10, 2023 (#100009426)	144 West Croom St. 32°41′32″N 93°57′36″W	Mooringsport	
40	Mooringsport School	Mooringsport School	June 13, 1996 (#96000605)	602 Latimer Street; 32°41′14″N 93°57′37″W	Mooringsport	Also known as Mooringsport Elementary School.
41	Oakland Cemetery	Oakland Cemetery	July 13, 1977 (#77000667)	Bounded by Milam Street, Christian Street and Sprague Street; 32°30′31″N 93°45′17″W	Shreveport	Post NRHP source available through wikilibrary: Newberry, Jane Leslie "Oakland Cemetery: Its Trials and tribulations; The Evolution of a National Historic Landmark" 19 (Spring/Summer 1988) North Louisiana Historical Association Journal pp 69-77
42	Ogilvie Hardware Company Building		October 12, 2000 (#00001210)	217 Jones Street; 32°30′33″N 93°44′32″W	Shreveport	Converted to 90 loft-style apartments in 2011, while preserving the historic building.
43	Oil City School	Oil City School	August 2, 2017 (#100001429)	407 North Kerley Avenue; 32°44′54″N 93°58′15″W	Oil City	Also known as Oil City Elementary Middle Magnet School, the 6 acres (2.4 ha) area comprises three historic buildings (Elementary School, High School and Gym/Cafeteria) and one historic site (Football/Baseball Field).
44	Old Commercial National Bank Building	Old Commercial National Bank Building	March 11, 1982 (#82002759)	509 Market Street; 32°30′51″N 93°44′51″W	Shreveport	Also known as the United Mercantile Bank Building. Built in 1910. Not to be confused with nearby 1938-39 building at the corner of Edward Street and Texas Street. Also contributing property of Shreveport Commercial Historic District since its creation on March 11, 1982.
45	Petroleum Tower	Petroleum Tower	September 17, 2013 (#13000730)	425 Edwards Street; 32°30′50″N 93°44′56″W	Shreveport	Also contributing property of Shreveport Commercial Historic District since its creation on March 11, 1982.
46	St. Mark's Episcopal Church	St. Mark's Episcopal Church	June 11, 1991 (#91000700)	875 Cotton Street; 32°30′25″N 93°45′05″W	Shreveport	Now known as Church of the Holy Cross. Also contributing property of Shreveport Commercial Historic District since its first boundary increase on May 16, 1997.
47	St. Paul's Bottoms	St. Paul's Bottoms	October 11, 1984 (#84000033)	Roughly bounded by North Western Avenue, North Pierre Avenue, Alston Street, Christian Street, Oakland Street, Snow Street, Texas Avenue and Milam Street; 32°30′26″N 93°45′28″W	Shreveport	Also known as Ledbetter Heights. The 134 acres (54 ha) area comprises a total of 792 contributing properties built between c.1880 and c.1934. A boundary increase, including 17 other contributing properties located on Texas Avenue and Milam Street, took place on July 9, 1999.
48	Scottish Rite Cathedral	Scottish Rite Cathedral	November 6, 1986 (#86003132)	725 Cotton Street; 32°30′30″N 93°44′59″W	Shreveport	Also contributing property of Shreveport Commercial Historic District since its first boundary increase on May 16, 1997.
49	Shreveport Commercial Historic District	Shreveport Commercial Historic District	March 11, 1982 (#82002760)	Roughly bounded by Commerce Street, Crockett Street, Market Street, Franklin Street, Lake Street, Commons Street, Elvis Presley Avenue, Douglas Street, Travis Street, Marshall Street and Fannin Street; 32°30′43″N 93°44′59″W	Shreveport	Also known as Downtown Shreveport Historic District. The 145 acres (59 ha) area comprises a total of 181 contributing properties. A first boundary increase took place on May 16, 1997, and a subsequent modification was made on April 29, 2015.
50	Shreveport Fire Station No. 8	Shreveport Fire Station No. 8	June 30, 2000 (#00000683)	3406 Velva Avenue; 32°28′49″N 93°46′54″W	Shreveport	
51	Shreveport Municipal Building	Shreveport Municipal Building	May 5, 1982 (#82002761)	724 McNeil Street; 32°30′35″N 93°44′55″W	Shreveport	Also contributing property of Shreveport Commercial Historic District since its first boundary increase on May 16, 1997.
52	Shreveport Municipal Memorial Auditorium	Shreveport Municipal Memorial Auditorium	May 28, 1991 (#91000624)	705 Elvis Presley Boulevard; 32°30′29″N 93°45′11″W	Shreveport	Also contributing property of Shreveport Commercial Historic District since its first boundary increase on May 16, 1997.
53	Shreveport Water Works Company, Pump Station	Shreveport Water Works Company, Pump Station	May 9, 1980 (#80001707)	142 North Common Street; 32°31′04″N 93°45′26″W	Shreveport	
54	Shreveport Woman's Department Club Building	Shreveport Woman's Department Club Building	July 18, 1985 (#85001590)	802 Margaret Place; 32°29′47″N 93°44′47″W	Shreveport	
55	South Highlands Fire Station	South Highlands Fire Station	May 28, 1991 (#91000626)	763 Oneonta Street; 32°27′53″N 93°44′45″W	Shreveport	Also a contributing property to South Highlands Historic District
56	South Highlands Historic District	South Highlands Historic District	April 29, 1999 (#99000496)	Roughly bounded by Southern Avenue, Lawhon Street, Fairfield Avenue, Trabue Street, Unadilla Street, Gilbert Drive, Oneonta Street, Line Avenue, Thora Boulevard, Thornhill Avenue, Delmar Street and Southfield Road; 32°27′50″N 93°44′54″W	Shreveport	The 188 acres (76 ha) area comprises a total of 394 contributing properties built between 1912 and 1949.
57	Star Cemetery	Star Cemetery	January 17, 2002 (#01001478)	West of St. Joseph Cemetery, access entrance in front of 2205 Texas Avenue; 32°29′26″N 93°46′09″W	Shreveport	
58	A. C. Steere Elementary School		February 20, 1991 (#91000074)	4009 Youree Drive; 32°28′01″N 93°43′18″W	Shreveport	
59	Strand Theatre	Strand Theatre	May 26, 1977 (#77000668)	630 Crockett Street; 32°30′37″N 93°45′00″W	Shreveport	Also contributing property of Shreveport Commercial Historic District since its first boundary increase on May 16, 1997.
60	Tally's Bank		July 14, 1976 (#76000963)	525 Spring Street; 32°30′52″N 93°44′46″W	Shreveport	Also contributing property of Shreveport Commercial Historic District since its creation on March 11, 1982.
61	Taylor Wholesale Grocers and Cotton Factors Warehouse-Lee Hardware Building		February 13, 1986 (#86000251)	719-729 Edwards Street; 32°30′42″N 93°44′47″W	Shreveport	Now known as Lee Hardware, building is also a contributing property of Shreveport Commercial Historic District since its first boundary increase on May 16, 1997.
62	Texas Avenue Buildings	Texas Avenue Buildings	May 25, 1979 (#79001055)	824-874 Texas Avenue; 32°30′31″N 93°45′07″W	Shreveport	All the district buildings became contributing properties of Shreveport Commercial Historic District since its first boundary increase on May 16, 1997.
63	Thrasher House		September 10, 1987 (#87001565)	Pioneer Heritage Center, Louisiana State University campus 32°25′53″N 93°42′12″W	Shreveport	
64	Trees City Office and Bank Building	Trees City Office and Bank Building	August 13, 1986 (#86001492)	200 South Land Avenue; 32°44′28″N 93°58′16″W	Oil City	
65	Trosper House	Trosper House	May 14, 1987 (#87000728)	7078 Magnolia Street; 32°26′29″N 93°58′35″W	Greenwood	
66	U.S. Post Office and Courthouse	U.S. Post Office and Courthouse	September 12, 1974 (#74000920)	424 Texas Street; 32°30′48″N 93°44′59″W	Shreveport	Also contributing property of Shreveport Commercial Historic District since its creation on March 11, 1982.
67	Booker T. Washington High School	Booker T. Washington High School	July 14, 2015 (#15000414)	2104 Milam Street; 32°30′19″N 93°46′26″W	Shreveport	
68	Samuel Wiener House	Samuel Wiener House	September 30, 2004 (#04001079)	615 Longleaf Road; 32°28′03″N 93°44′33″W	Shreveport	
69	Wile House	Wile House	August 5, 1991 (#91001007)	626 Wilder Place; 32°28′35″N 93°44′35″W	Shreveport	
70	Wray-Dickinson Building	Wray-Dickinson Building	March 24, 1983 (#83000492)	308 Market Street; 32°30′56″N 93°44′58″W	Shreveport	Also contributing property of Shreveport Commercial Historic District since its second boundary increase on April 29, 2015.
71	YMCA, Downtown Branch	YMCA, Downtown Branch	May 28, 1991 (#91000621)	400 McNeil Street; 32°30′46″N 93°45′05″W	Shreveport	Also contributing property of Shreveport Commercial Historic District since its first boundary increase on May 16, 1997.

== Former listings ==
	Name on the Register	Image	Date listed	Date removed	Location	City or town	Description
1	C.C. Antoine House	C.C. Antoine House	August 20, 1999 (#99001013)	March 13, 2024	1941 Perrin Street; 32°30′35″N 93°46′15″W	Shreveport	In April 2007 a move of the property to a public park at corner of Sycamore Avenue and Milam Street was pre-approved, but never took place. Destroyed by fire in May 2022.
2	Sidney Herold Mansion		July 25, 1978 (#78003197)	August 2, 1978	840 Jordan Street; 32°29′56″N 93°44′51″W	Shreveport	Removed from the register due to owner objection. Demolished later in 1978.
3	Huey P. Long House	Huey P. Long House	June 10, 1991 (#91000701)	May 2, 2016	2403 Laurel Street; 32°29′43″N 93°46′36″W	Shreveport	Destroyed by fire in September 1992.
4	Sprague Street Houses		October 3, 1983 (#83003606)	January 31, 2019	1100-1118 Sprague Street; 32°30′32″N 93°45′21″W	Shreveport	All houses have been demolished. The last one, at 1118 Sprague Street, on the corner of Christian Street, was torn down in early 2017.

== See also ==
- List of National Historic Landmarks in Louisiana
- National Register of Historic Places listings in Louisiana
