= Shreveport Waterworks Pumping Station =

- U.S. National Register of Historic Places
- U.S. National Historic Landmark
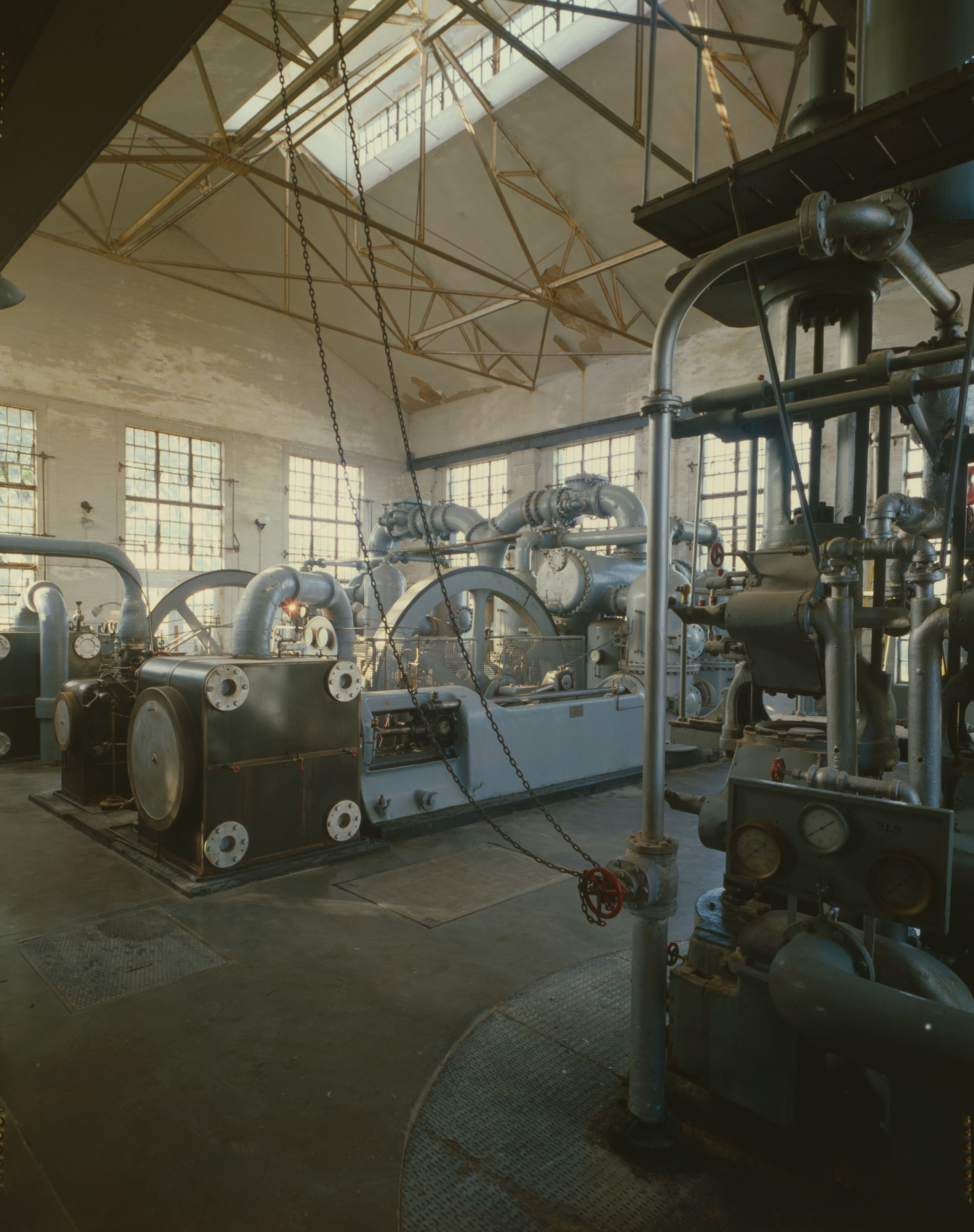
- McNeil Street Pumping Station

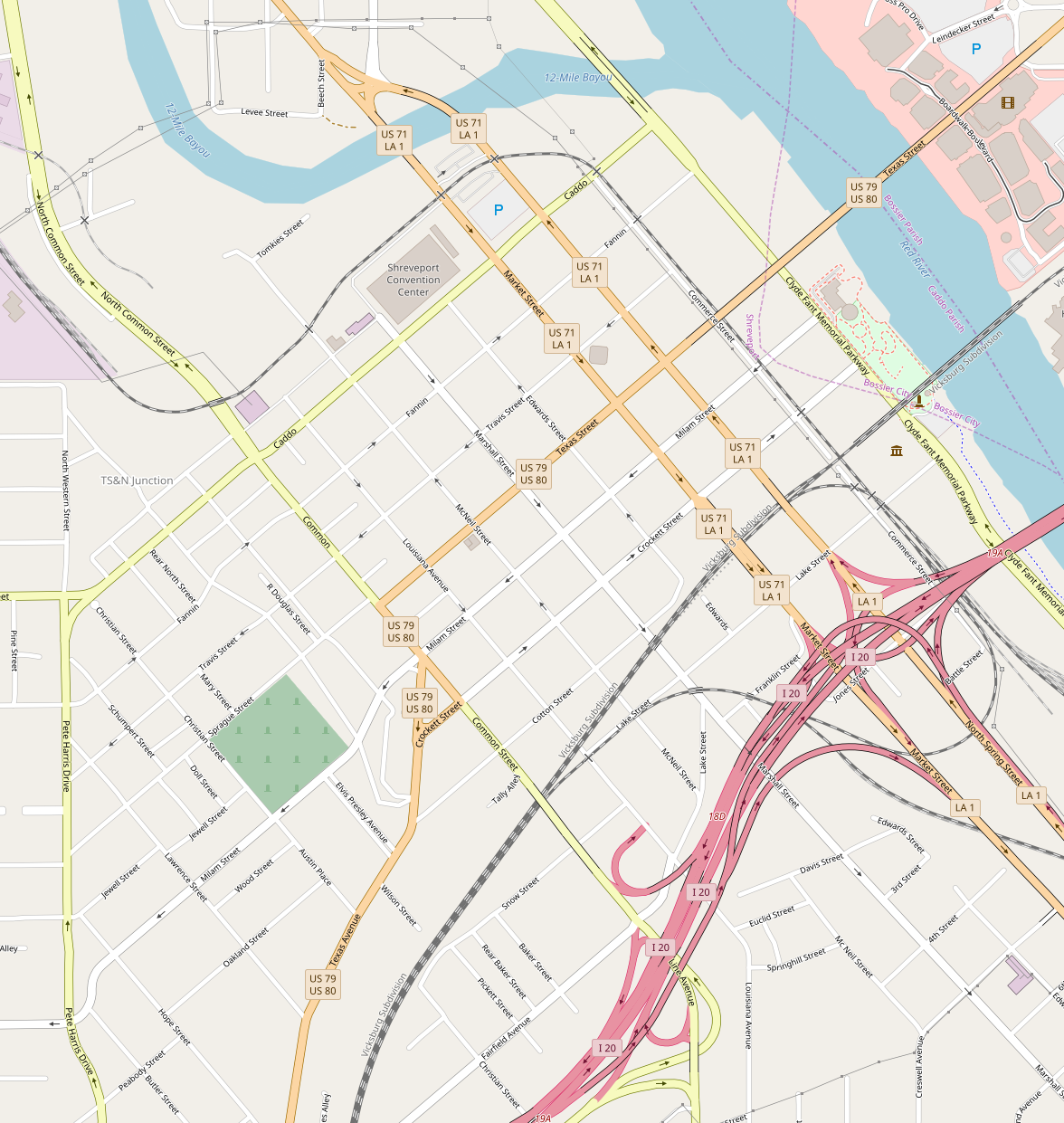
- Location within Shreveport Downtown
- Location: 142 North Common Street, Shreveport, Louisiana
- Coordinates: 32°31′04″N 93°45′26″W
- Area: 4 acres (1.6 ha)
- Built: 1887
- NRHP reference No.: 80001707

Significant dates
- Added to NRHP: May 9, 1980
- Designated NHL: December 17, 1982

The Shreveport Waterworks Pumping Station, also known as the McNeil Street Pump Station, is a historic water pumping station at 142 North Common Street in Shreveport, Louisiana. Now hosting the Shreveport Water Works Museum, it exhibits in situ a century's worth of water pumping equipment, and was the nation's last steam-powered waterworks facility when it was shut down in 1980.

It was added to the National Register of Historic Places in 1980, declared a National Historic Landmark in 1982, and designated as a National Historic Civil Engineering Landmark in 1999.

== Description and history ==
The Shreveport Water Works Museum is located west of Shreveport's downtown, between North Common Avenue and Twelve Mile Bayou, which feeds into the Red River just north of downtown. The complex consists of a group of predominantly brick buildings, which house in them a variety of pumping equipment, dating from 1892 to about 1921. The oldest buildings date to 1887, when the city contracted for the construction of a waterworks facility to replace a combination of cisterns and wells that had become inadequate to meet the city's needs. As the technology for pumping and filtering water changed, either the existing buildings were altered, or new ones built, in many cases leaving some of the older equipment in place. It saw significant changes to the plant in the first decade of the 20th century, and again after the city purchased the plant from its private operator in 1917. The city continued to operate the steam pumps through the 1970s, even as they were becoming obsolete due to advances in electric pumping engines.

The station was closed in 1980. The property was afterward converted to a museum, featuring displays of the restored steam machinery, including pumps, filters and other equipment.

The Shreveport Railroad Museum is located on the grounds of the Shreveport Water Works Museum. Both museums are open to the public.

== See also ==
- List of National Historic Landmarks in Louisiana
- National Register of Historic Places listings in Caddo Parish, Louisiana
