= South Highlands Fire Station =

- U.S. National Register of Historic Places
- U.S. Historic district – Contributing property
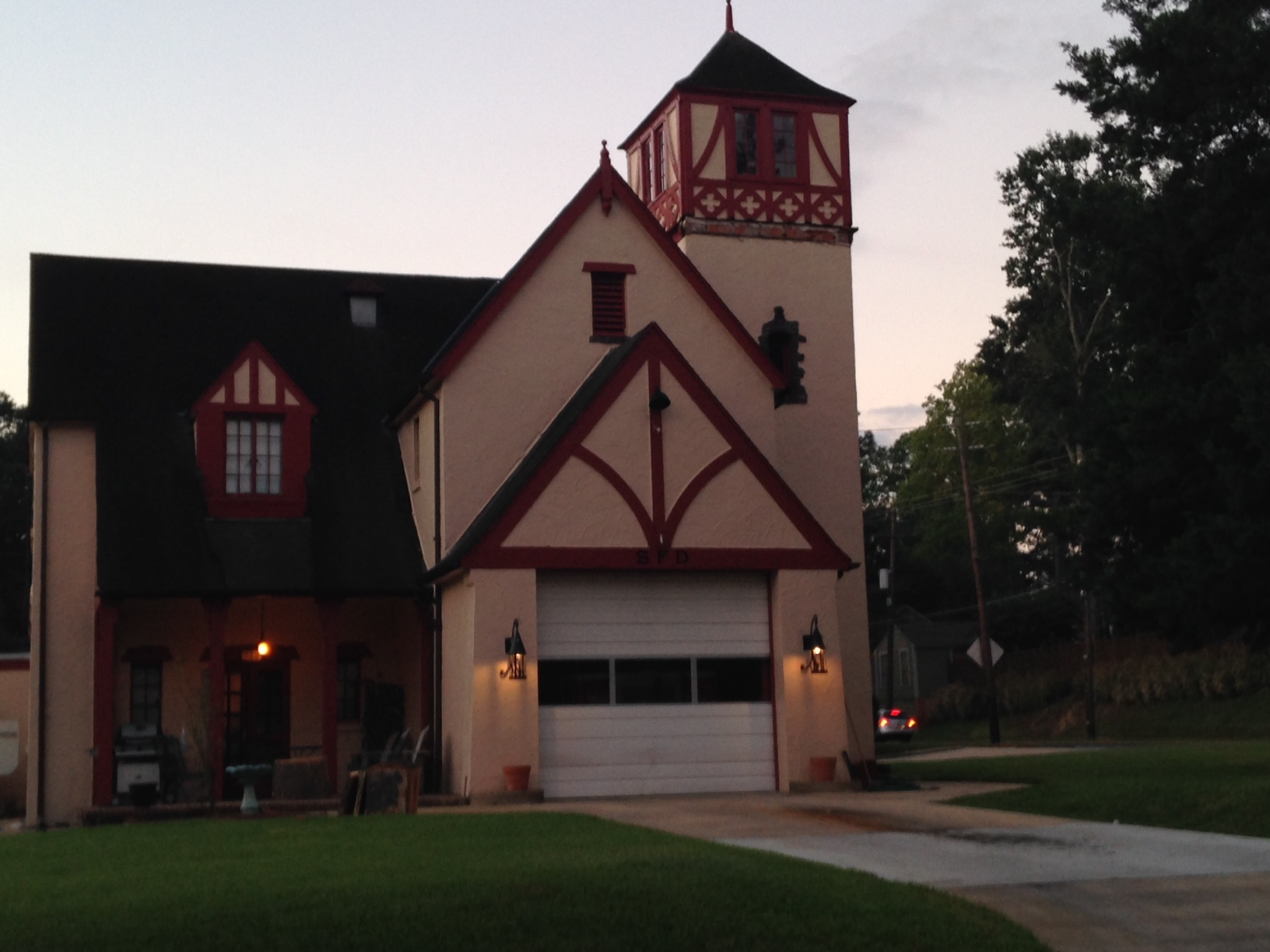

- Location within Louisiana
- Location: 763 Oneonta, Shreveport, Louisiana
- Coordinates: 32°27′53″N 93°44′45″W
- Area: less than one acre
- Built: 1929
- Architect: Henry Schwartz
- Architectural style: Late 19th and 20th Century Revivals, German Medieval
- Part of: South Highlands Historic District (ID99000496)
- NRHP reference No.: 91000626

Significant dates
- Added to NRHP: May 28, 1991
- Designated CP: April 29, 1999

The South Highlands Fire Station, at 763 Oneonta in Shreveport, Louisiana, was built in 1929. It was listed on the National Register of Historic Places in 1991. It has also been known as Fire Station No. 10.

It was designed by architect Henry Schwartz. According to its NRHP nomination, "The South Highlands Fire Station is conspicuous among Shreveport's vast collection of early twentieth century eclectic buildings because of its very unusual choice of inspiration. Although it is an evocative interpretation rather than an exact copy, it strongly reflects the influence of the German vernacular architecture of the Middle Ages."

It is also a contributing property in the South Highlands Historic District.

== See also ==
- Central Fire Station (Shreveport, Louisiana)
- Shreveport Fire Station No. 8
- National Register of Historic Places listings in Caddo Parish, Louisiana
