= Engine House (disambiguation) =

An engine house is a building that holds engines, often stationary engines providing power.

The term is also used, at least in the United States, to mean a fire station holding fire engines/trucks.

Engine House or variations such as Engine House No. X, may refer to:

== United States ==
(ordered by state then city)

- Engine House No. 18 (Los Angeles, California), a fire station
- Engine House No. 31 (San Francisco, California), a fire station
- Mechanics Engine House No. 4, Macon, Georgia, a fire station
- Engine House No. 3 (Fort Wayne, Indiana), a fire station
- Valley Junction-West Des Moines City Hall and Engine House, West Des Moines, Iowa, a fire station
- Engine House No. 6 (Wichita, Kansas), a fire station
- Engine House (Auburn, Maine), a fire station
- Monson Engine House, Monson, Maine, a fire station that is now the Monson Historical Society Museum
- Old City Hall and Engine House, Annapolis, Maryland
- Engine House No. 6 (Baltimore, Maryland), a fire station
- Engine House No. 8 (Baltimore, Maryland), a fire station
- Engine House No. 34 (Boston, Massachusetts), a fire station
- Engine House No. 6 (Lawrence, Massachusetts), a fire station
- Weir Engine House, Taunton, Massachusetts, a fire station
- Engine House No. 11 (Detroit), Michigan, a fire station
- Engine House No. 18 (Detroit), Michigan, a fire station
- Cleveland Mine Engine House Number 3, Ishpeming, Michigan, an engine house holding hoist engines
- Engine House No. 3 (Kalamazoo, Michigan), a fire station
- Winona and St. Peter Engine House, Winona, Minnesota, a fire station
- Fort Benton Engine House, Fort Benton, Montana, a fire station
- Engine House No. 3, Truck No. 2, in Hoboken, New Jersey, a fire station
- Engine House No. 28, in Buffalo, New York, a fire station
- Niagara Engine House, Poughkeepsie, New York
- Engine House No. 5 (Columbus, Ohio), a fire station
- Engine House No. 6 (Columbus, Ohio), a fire station
- Engine House No. 7 (Columbus, Ohio), a fire station
- Engine House No. 8 (Columbus, Ohio), a fire station
- Engine House No. 10 (Columbus, Ohio), a fire station
- Engine House No. 12 (Columbus, Ohio), a fire station
- Engine House No. 16 (Columbus, Ohio), a fire station that is now the Central Ohio Fire Museum
- Engine House No. 1 (Sandusky, Ohio), a fire station
- Engine House No. 3 (Sandusky, Ohio), a fire station
- Waynesville Engine House and Lockup, Waynesville, Ohio, a fire station
- Engine House No. 4 (Tacoma, Washington), a fire station
- Engine House No. 8 (Tacoma, Washington), a fire station
- Engine House No. 9 (Tacoma, Washington), a fire station
- Engine House No. 11 (Tacoma, Washington), a fire station
- Engine House No. 13 (Tacoma, Washington), a fire station
- Engine House No. 7 (Washington, D.C.), a fire station
- Engine House No. 10 (Washington, D.C.), a fire station
- Omro Village Hall and Engine House, Omro, Wisconsin, a fire station
- Tigerton Village Hall and Engine House, Tigerton, Wisconsin, a fire station

== Other countries ==
- The Engine House, a railway education centre in Shropshire, England

== See also ==
- List of fire stations, which lists notable fire stations including numerous of name "Engine House No. X" format
