= Fire Station No. 4 =

Fire Station No. 4, and variations such as Engine House No. 4, may refer to:

(ordered by U.S. state then city)

- Fire Station No. 4 (Miami, Florida)
- Mechanics Engine House No. 4, Macon, Georgia
- Fire Station Number 4 (Columbus, Indiana), designed by Robert Venturi, 1966 in architecture
- Old Hose House No. 4, Evansville, Indiana
- Fire Station No. 4 (Des Moines, Iowa)
- Hose Station No. 4, Davenport, Iowa, home of International Fire Museum
- Portland Fire Museum, Portland, Maine, in the former home of Fire Engine 4
- Fire Station No. 4 (New Bedford, Massachusetts)
- Old Fire House No. 4 (Kalamazoo, Michigan)
- Firehouse No. 4 (Plainfield, New Jersey)
- Fire Station No. 4 (Elmira, New York)
- Fire Station Number 4 (Asheville, North Carolina)
- Fire Station No. 4 (Pawtucket, Rhode Island)
- Number 4 Hook and Ladder Company, Dallas, Texas
- Engine House No. 4 (Tacoma, Washington)
- Fire Station No. 4 (Madison, Wisconsin)

== See also ==
- List of fire stations
