= Fire Station No. 11 =

Fire Station No. 11, and variations such as Engine House No. 11, may refer to:

in the United States

(by state then city)

- Fire Station No. 11 (Birmingham, Alabama)
- Fire Station No. 11 (Denver, Colorado), a Denver Landmark
- Fire Station No. 11 (Atlanta, Georgia)
- Fire Station No. 11 (Kansas City, Missouri), the city's first Black company and historic station
- Engine House No. 11 (Detroit), Michigan
- Engine House No. 11 (Columbus, Ohio)
- Number 4 Hook and Ladder Company, Dallas, Texas, also known as "Fire Station No. 11"
- Engine House No. 11 (Tacoma, Washington), also known as "Fire Station No. 11"
- Truck Company F, Washington D.C., also known as "Old Engine Company 11"
- Warwood Fire Station, Wheeling, West Virginia, also known as "Fire Department No. 11"

== See also ==
- List of fire stations
