= Fire Station No. 8 =

Fire Station No. 8, and variations such as Engine House No. 8, may refer to:

in Canada

- No. 8 Hose Station, Toronto

in the United States

(ordered by state then city)

- Terre Haute Fire Station No. 8, Terre Haute, Indiana
- Shreveport Fire Station No. 8, Shreveport, Louisiana
- Engine House No. 8 (Baltimore, Maryland)
- Engine House No. 8 (Columbus, Ohio)
- Firestation No. 8 (Salt Lake City, Utah)
- Engine House No. 8 (Tacoma, Washington)

== See also ==
- List of fire stations
