= Fire Station No. 6 =

Fire Station No. 6, and variations such as Engine House No. 6, may refer to:

- Fire Station No. 6 (Birmingham, Alabama)
- Fire Station No. 6 (Sacramento, California)
- Fire Station No. 6 (Atlanta), Georgia, included in the Martin Luther King, Jr., National Historic Site
- Engine House No. 6 (Wichita, Kansas)
- Engine House No. 6 (Baltimore, Maryland)
- Engine House No. 6 (Lawrence, Massachusetts)
- Engine House No. 6 (Columbus, Ohio)
- James Geddes Engine Company No. 6, Nashville, Tennessee
- Truck Company F, Washington, D.C., also known as "Truck Company 6"

== See also ==
- List of fire stations
