= Fire Station No. 13 =

Fire Station No. 13 may refer to:

- Station 13 Minneapolis Fire Department, Minneapolis, MN, NRHP-listed
- Firehouse No. 13, Louisville, KY, NRHP-listed
- Engine House No. 13 (Tacoma, Washington), NRHP-listed

== See also ==
- List of fire stations
