= Paca Street Firehouse =

- U.S. National Register of Historic Places
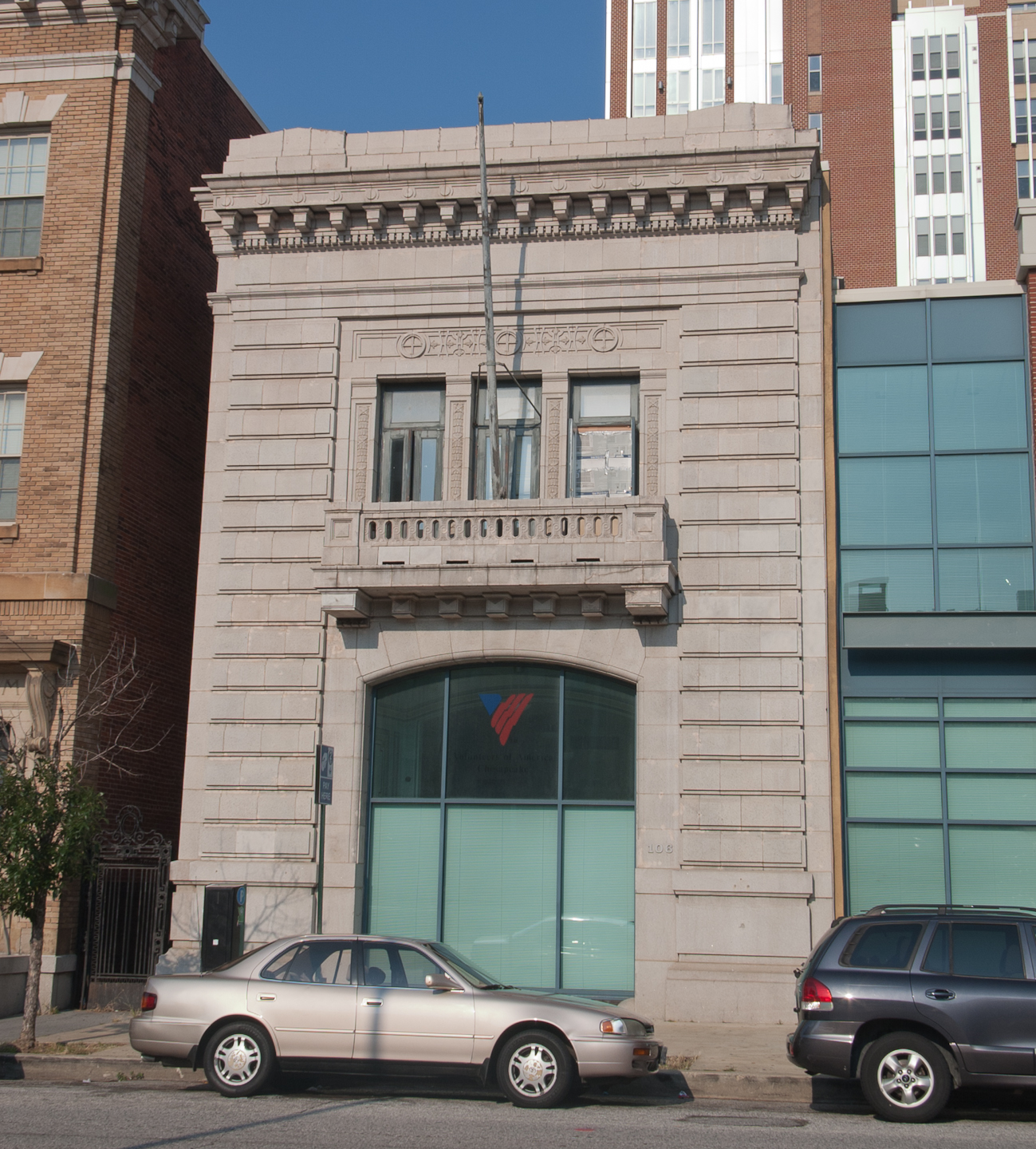
- Paca Street Firehouse, August 2011

- Location within Baltimore Location within Maryland Location within the United States
- Location: 106 North Paca Street, Baltimore, Maryland
- Coordinates: 39°17′26.7″N 76°37′21.3″W
- Area: less than one acre
- Built: 1909
- Architect: Laferty, J. E.
- Architectural style: Classical Revival
- NRHP reference No.: 83003631
- Added to NRHP: October 28, 1983

Paca Street Firehouse, also known as Truck House No. 2, is a historic fire station located at Baltimore, Maryland, United States. The architect of Paca Street Firehouse is John E. Lafferty. It is a 1909 two-story brick structure with a highly detailed stone Renaissance Revival façade. The principal space is a large room subdivided at the Paca Street end into offices. It is one of three early 20th century firehouses standing and is the only one to retain its original features, particularly in the interior.

Paca Street Firehouse was listed on the National Register of Historic Places in 1983.

== See also ==
- Fire departments in Maryland
- Engine House No. 6 (Baltimore, Maryland)
- Engine House No. 8 (Baltimore, Maryland)
- Poppleton Fire Station
