= Poppleton Fire Station =

- U.S. National Register of Historic Places
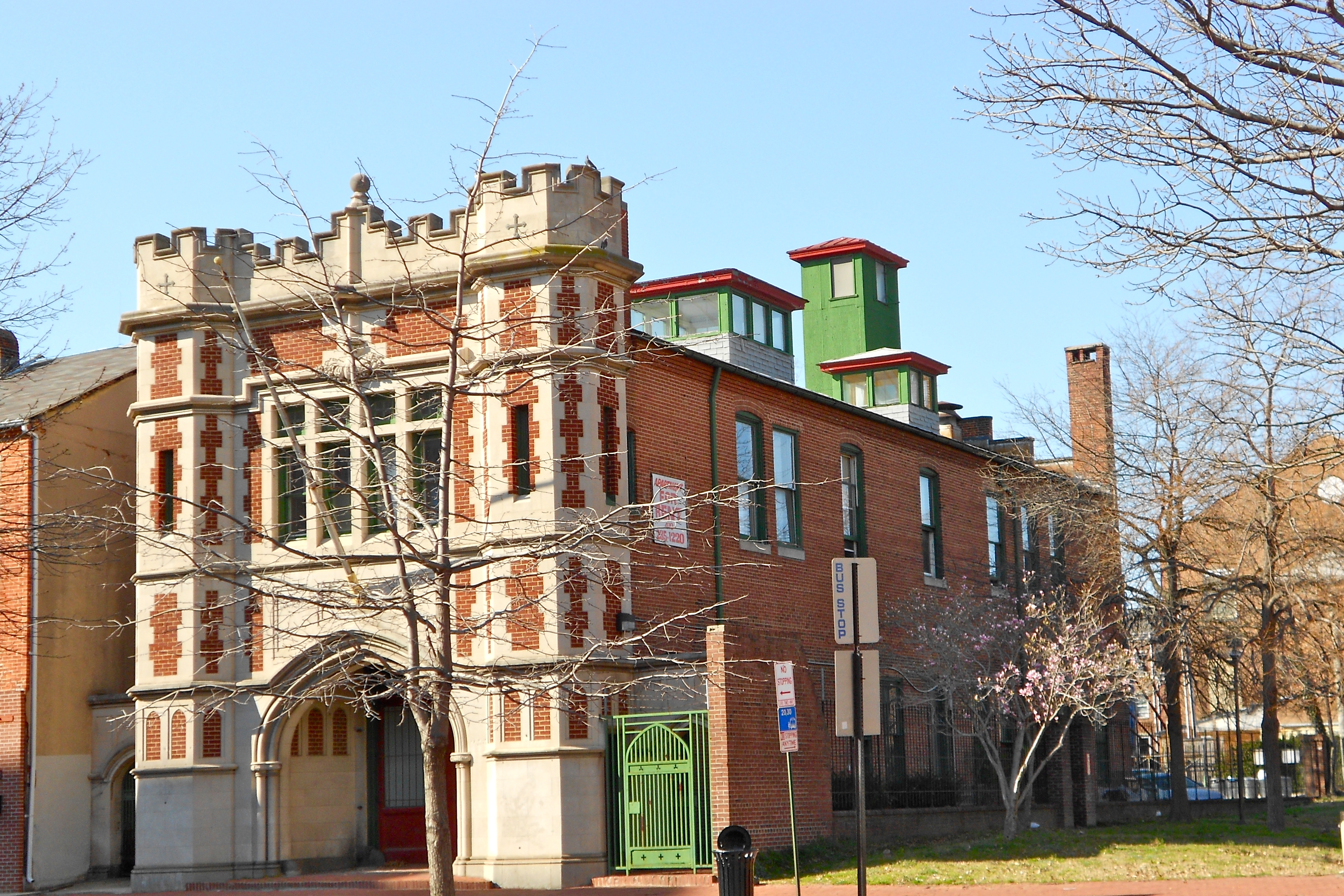

- Location within Baltimore Location within Maryland Location within the United States
- Location: 756-760 W. Baltimore St., Baltimore, Maryland
- Coordinates: 39°17′20″N 76°37′44″W
- Area: 0.2 acres (0.081 ha)
- Built: 1910
- Architectural style: Tudor Revival
- NRHP reference No.: 83002938
- Added to NRHP: September 8, 1983

Poppleton Fire Station, also known as Engine House #38, is a historic fire station located at Baltimore, Maryland, United States. It is a Tudor Revival style building built of brick, one large bay wide, approximately nine bays long, and two stories high with a gable roof. The front façade is a brick and limestone composition featuring a central, Tudor archway flanked by octagonal towers and crowned with crenellation. The archway features engaged colonettes with carved, foliated capitals containing firemen racing to extinguish a fire. It was designed by Owens and Sisco and built in 1910.

Poppleton Fire Station was listed on the National Register of Historic Places in 1983.

== See also ==
- Fire departments in Maryland
- Engine House No. 6 (Baltimore, Maryland)
- Engine House No. 8 (Baltimore, Maryland)
- Paca Street Firehouse
