= Fire Station Number 4 (Asheville, North Carolina) =

Historic firehouse in North Carolina, US

- U.S. National Register of Historic Places
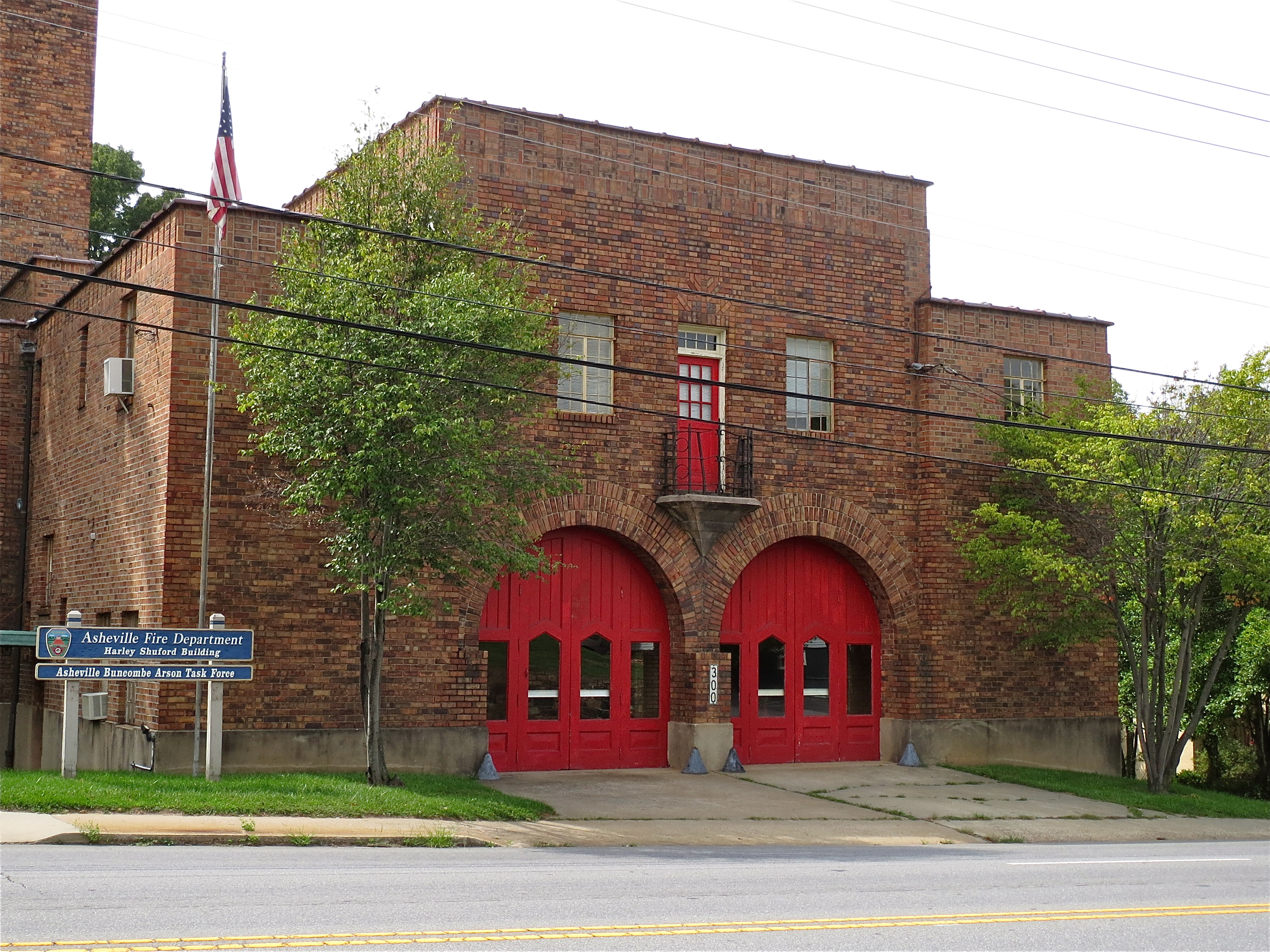

- Location within North Carolina Location within the United States
- Location: 300 Merrimon Ave., Asheville, North Carolina
- Coordinates: 35°36′32″N 82°33′17″W
- Area: 1 acre (0.40 ha)
- Built: 1927
- Architect: Ellington, Douglas D.
- Architectural style: Art Deco
- NRHP reference No.: 00000336
- Added to NRHP: April 6, 2000

Fire Station Number 4 in Asheville, North Carolina, also known as Merrimon Avenue Fire Station, is a historic fire station. It was built in 1927, and is a two-story, flat roofed, multi-colored brick building in the Art Deco style. It features a five-story tower with an open-shaft staircase.

It was listed on the National Register of Historic Places in 2000.
