= Fire Museum of Maryland =

Museum in Lutherville, Maryland, US

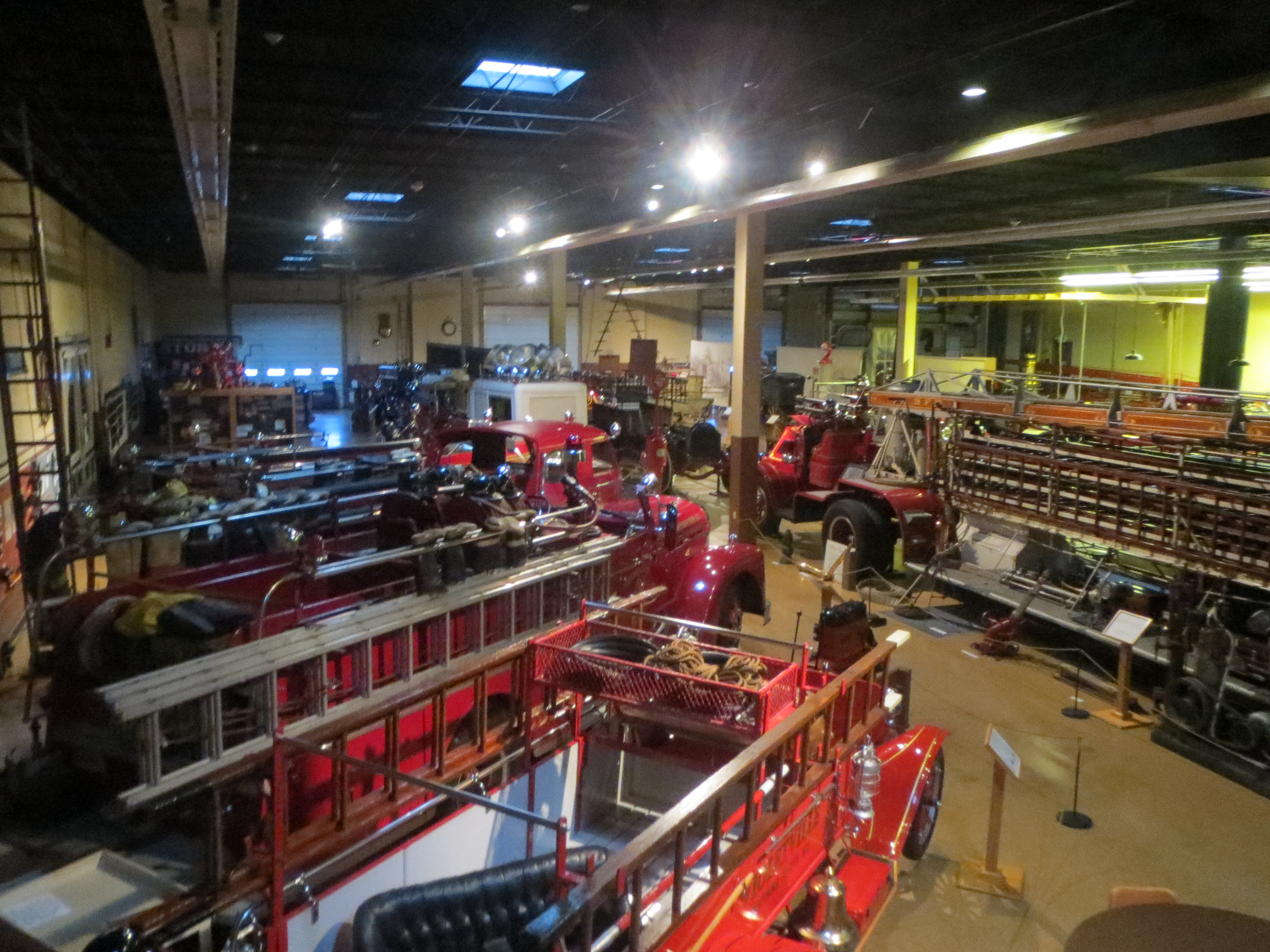
- Main exhibit hall
- Established: 1971
- Location: 1301 York Road; Lutherville, Maryland 21093
- Coordinates: 39.418001°N 76.614551°W
- Type: Fire museum
- Director: Jeff Buchheit
- Curator: Stephen Heaver
- Parking: Free on-site parking
- Website: www.firemuseummd.org

The Fire Museum of Maryland, founded in 1971, is located in Lutherville, Maryland near Baltimore, Maryland. With a collection of over forty pieces of firefighting apparatus, the Fire Museum of Maryland explains and interprets the history of the urban fire service in the U.S. for visitors and through school programming. The museum began as the private collection of the Stephen G. Heaver family collected over forty years. The museum has one of the largest collections of fire apparatus in the country.

On September 12, 2025, Speaker Emeritus Nancy Pelosi visited the Fire Museum of Maryland to spread awareness of the Thomas D'Alesandro, Jr. fireboat, which was named after her father.

The museum holds an annual "Lantern Night" program where museum docents and staff tell stories from the Battle of Baltimore and the War of 1812 while dressed in period clothing.
