= James Geddes Engine Company No. 6 =

- Geddes, James, Engine Company No. 6
- U.S. National Register of Historic Places
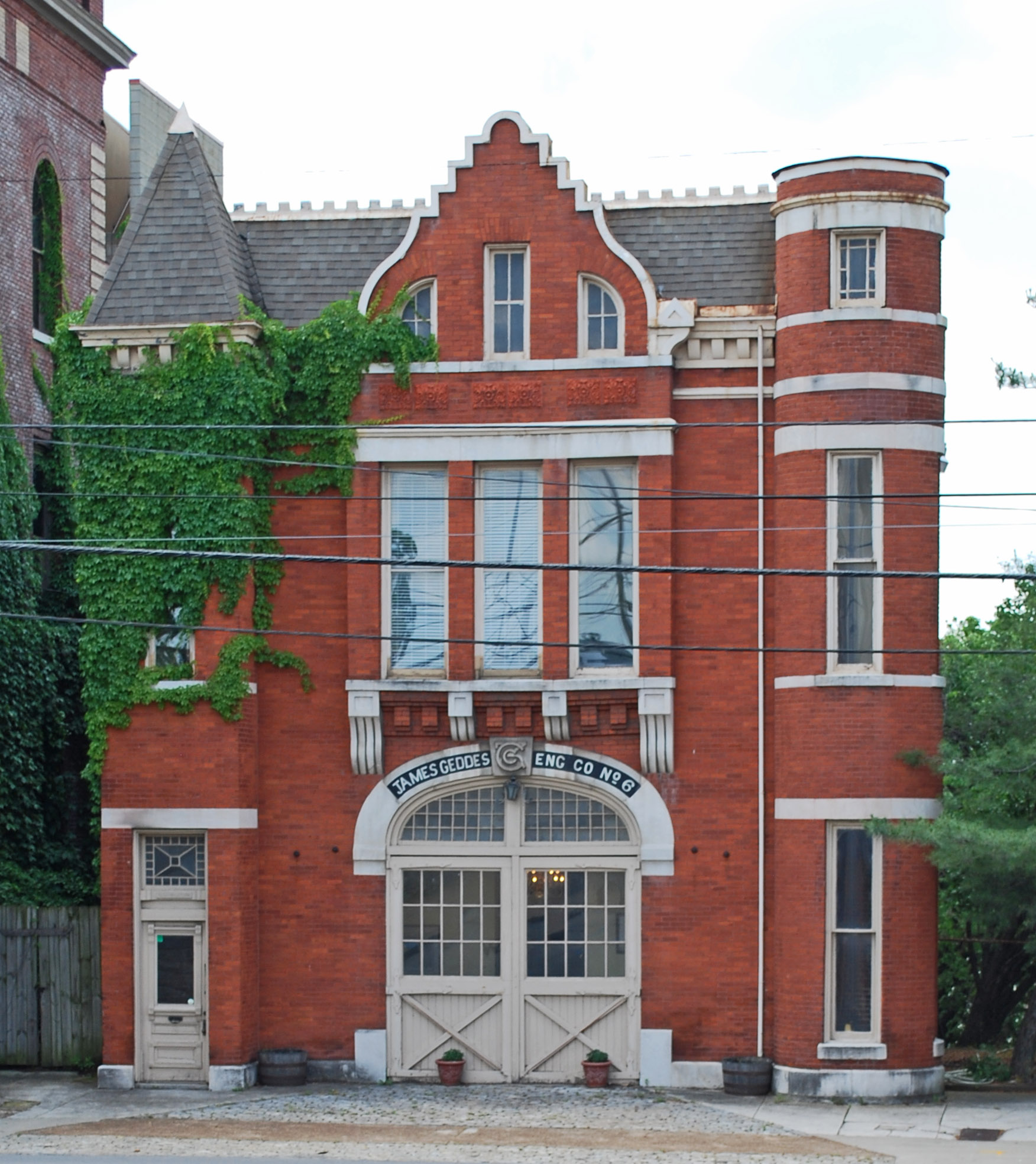

- Location within Tennessee
- Location: 629 2nd Ave., S., Nashville, Tennessee
- Coordinates: 36°09′16″N 86°46′14″W
- Area: less than one acre
- Built: 1884-85
- Architectural style: Victorian
- NRHP reference No.: 78002580
- Added to NRHP: January 9, 1978

The James Geddes Engine Company No. 6, at 629 2nd Ave., S., in Nashville, Tennessee, was built in 1884–85. It was listed on the National Register of Historic Places in 1978.

It is a two-story red brick building with terra cotta, stone, and metal details.

It is named for James Geddes, a Scottish-born civil engineer who long worked for the Louisville and Nashville Railroad and was a "prominent Nashvillian".
