= Firestation No. 8 (Salt Lake City) =

Historic building in Salt Lake City, Utah, U.S.

- U.S. National Register of Historic Places
- U.S. Historic district – Contributing property
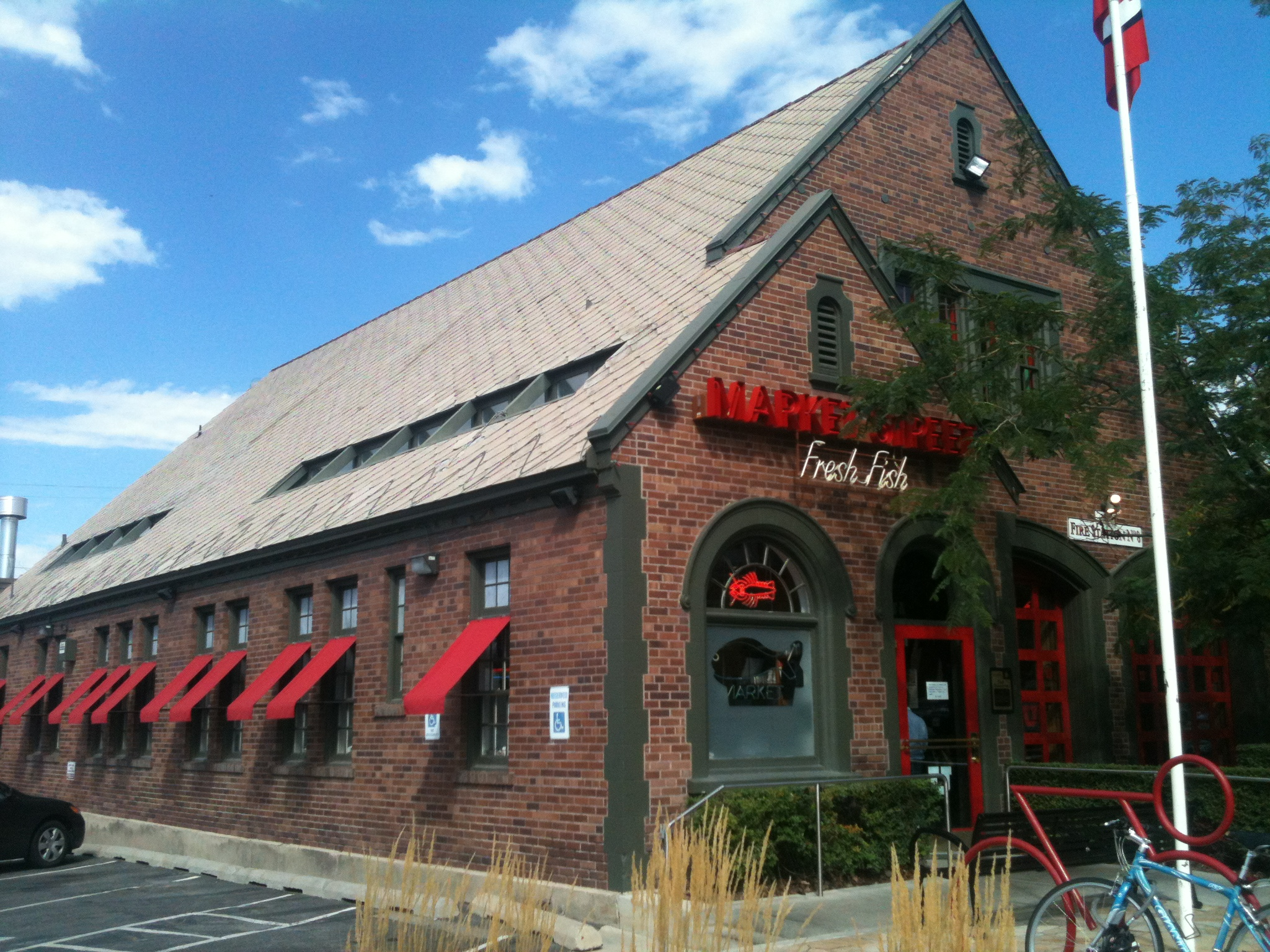
- Firestation No. 8, September 2013

- Location within Utah Location within the United States
- Location: 258 South 1300 East; Salt Lake City, Utah; United States
- Coordinates: 40°45′49″N 111°51′13″W
- Area: less than one acre
- Built: 1930
- Built by: Albert White, contractor
- Architectural style: Late 19th and 20th Century Revivals, English Period Revival
- Part of: University Neighborhood Historic District (ID95001430)
- NRHP reference No.: 83004423

Significant dates
- Added to NRHP: July 28, 1983
- Designated CP: December 13, 1995

Firestation No. 8 is a historic building in northeastern Salt Lake City, Utah, United States, that is located within the University Neighborhood Historic District, but is individually listed on the National Register of Historic Places (NRHP).

== Description ==
The former fire station, located at 258 South 1300 East, was built in 1930. When listed, it was then the second oldest relatively intact fire station in Salt Lake City, after No. 3, built in 1914. The station was built in 1930 to serve the east bench area. It was designed to be compatible with the residential neighborhood, and has elements of English Cottage styling.

The station was operational until 1980, although used only by paramedics in the later years, because the doorways could not handle large modern firetrucks. It later served as a restaurant.

The building was listed on the NRHP July 28, 1983. Over a decade later it was also included as a contributing building in the University Neighborhood Historic District, NRHP-listed in 1995.

== See also ==
- National Register of Historic Places listings in Salt Lake City
