= Old Hose House No. 4 =

- Formerly listed on the U.S. National Register of Historic Places
- Location within Indiana Location within the United States
- Location: 623 Ingle St., Evansville, Indiana
- Coordinates: 37°58′35″N 87°34′16″W
- Area: less than one acre
- Built: 1860
- MPS: Downtown Evansville MRA
- NRHP reference No.: 82001856

Significant dates
- Added to NRHP: July 1, 1982
- Removed from NRHP: June 8, 2011

Old Hose House No. 4, also known as Whiting Sheet Metal, was a historic fire station located in downtown Evansville, Indiana. It was built in 1860. It has been demolished.

It was listed on the National Register of Historic Places in 1982 and delisted in 2011.
