= Monson Historical Society Museum =

- Monson Engine House (Former)
- U.S. National Register of Historic Places
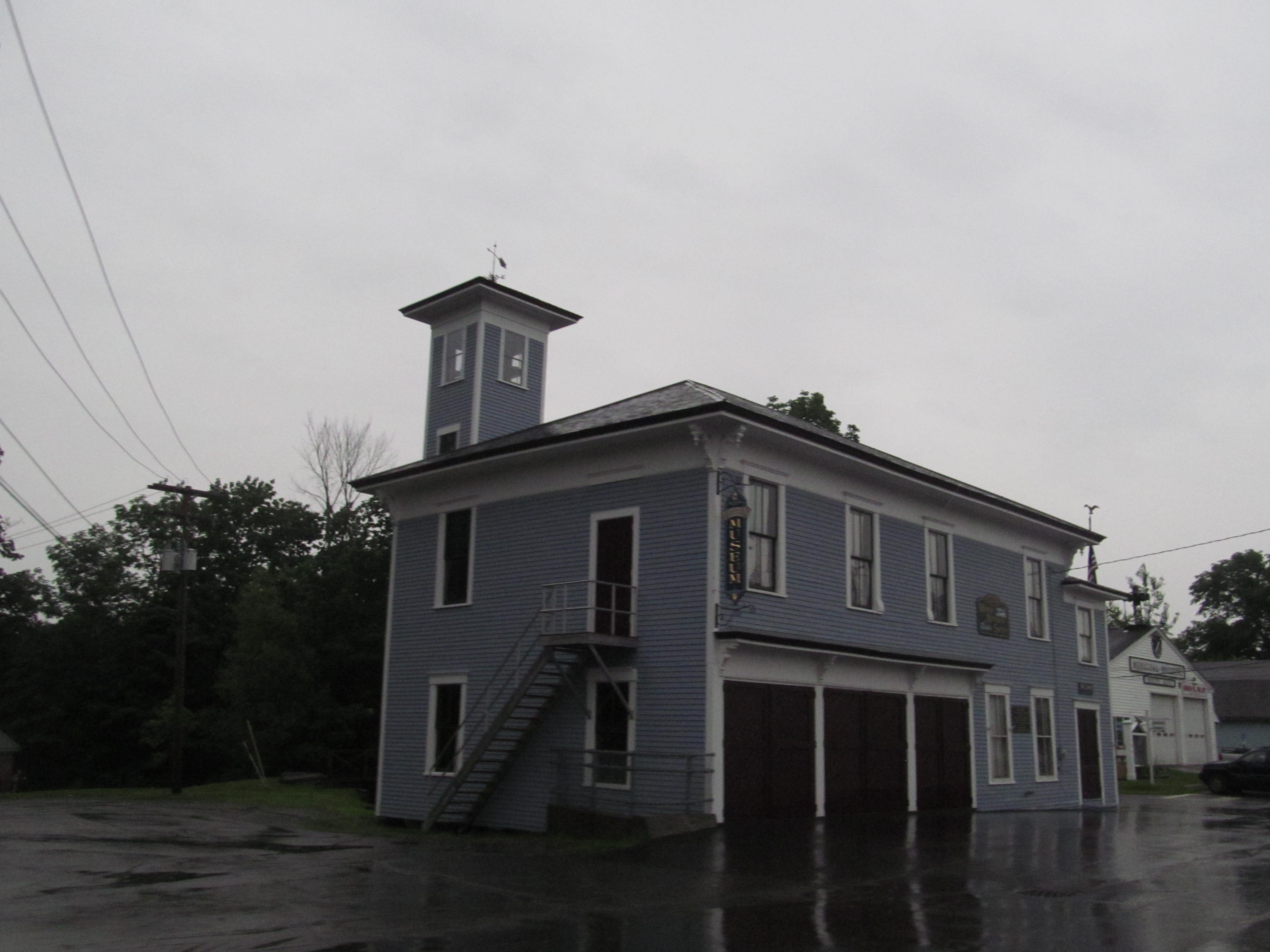

- Location within Maine Location within the United States
- Location: Main Street, Monson, Maine
- Coordinates: 45°17′10″N 69°30′0″W
- Area: less than one acre
- Built: 1889
- Architectural style: Italianate
- NRHP reference No.: 05000798
- Added to NRHP: August 5, 2005

The Monson Historical Society Museum is located on Main Street in the center of Monson, Maine. It is housed in a former municipal building, built in 1889 to house firefighting equipment and a fraternal lodge, and listed on the National Register of Historic Places as Monson Engine House (Former) on August 5, 2005, as one of a small number of surviving 19th-century fire stations in rural interior Maine. The museum is open on Saturdays in the summer, showing items of local historical interest.

== Architecture and building history ==
The museum building is a rectangular two-story wood-frame structure, set on the east side of Main Street, just south of Phillips Brook, which is the outlet of nearby Hebron Pond. The building is set on a slate pier foundation, whose northeast corner projects over the stream. This corner is the location of a four-story hose-drying tower, arranged so that drying firehoses can drain directly into the stream. The building has a hip roof, as do the tower and a southern 1 1/2-story addition. The main facade faces west, and is divided into six bays. The three left bays have double-leaf equipment doors with a decorative frieze above, and symmetrically placed sash windows on the second floor. The next two bays have sash windows on the first floor, the right one with a window above as well. The rightmost bay has the building's personnel entrance and a smaller sash window above. Below the roofline is a soffit supported by scrolled brackets.

The building has seen multiple, sometimes overlapping, uses since its construction in 1889. It was originally built to store firefighting equipment on the lower level, and to provide a meeting space for the Grand Army of the Republic (GAR), a Civil War veterans organization, on the upper level. The town used the building for fire equipment storage until 1968. The GAR chapter was moribund by 1910, and surviving members sold the group's interest in the building to the town in 1918. The GAR facility was also used by a number of other local social organizations, including the Daughters of the American Revolution (DAR) and the local Grange chapter.

The town held its town meetings and offices in another building (no longer standing) until 1918, when these functions were moved into the GAR facilities of this building, which included the construction of a small jail cell in the basement. In 1936-37 the building was enlarged by the southern addition, and the building was outfitted with heat. It was known as Monson Town Hall until 1968, when the present town hall was built next door. It was sold to the DAR in that year, which established a small local history museum. The DAR sold it back to the town in 2003, which turned maintenance of management of the building over to the local historical society.

The building is one of four known 19th-century fire stations still standing in Maine's smaller communities. It was listed on the National Register of Historic Places in 2005.

== See also ==
- National Register of Historic Places listings in Piscataquis County, Maine
