= Old City Hall and Engine House =

- U.S. National Register of Historic Places
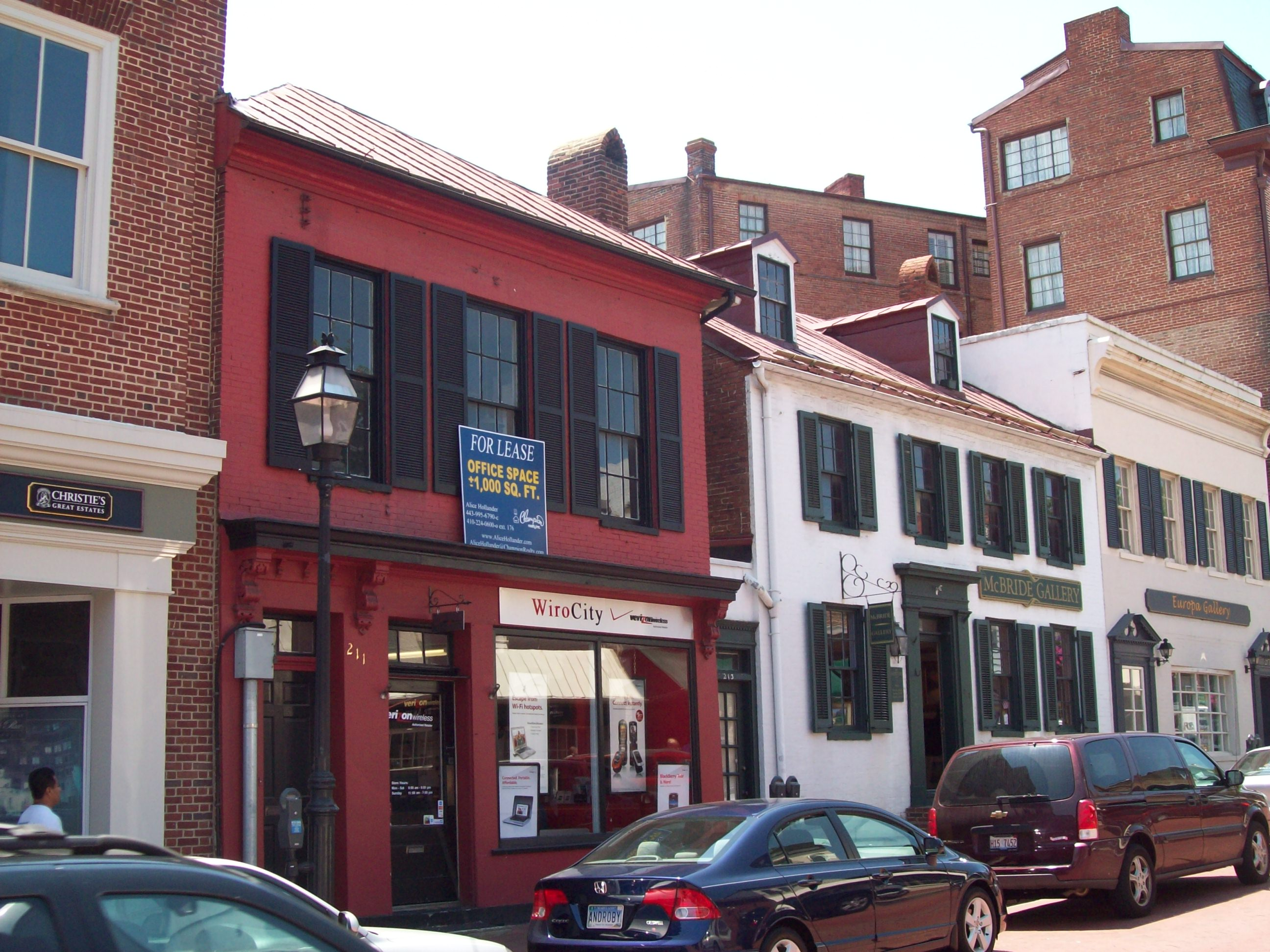
- Old City Hall and Engine House, July 2009

- Location within Maryland Location within the United States
- Location: 211–213 Main St., Annapolis, Maryland
- Coordinates: 38°58′40.9″N 76°29′29.2″W
- Built: 1821
- NRHP reference No.: 73000892
- Added to NRHP: January 29, 1973

The Old City Hall and Engine House is a historic municipal building at Annapolis, Anne Arundel County, Maryland, United States. It is a 2 1/2-story, three bay brick building built 1821–1822 by the City of Annapolis. It was the first structure erected by the city for municipal purposes. On the first floor was the fire station, with a meeting room for the town council above. In 1868 the city sold the building for commercial purposes.

The Old City Hall and Engine House was listed on the National Register of Historic Places in 1973.
