= Terre Haute Fire Station No. 8 =

- U.S. National Register of Historic Places
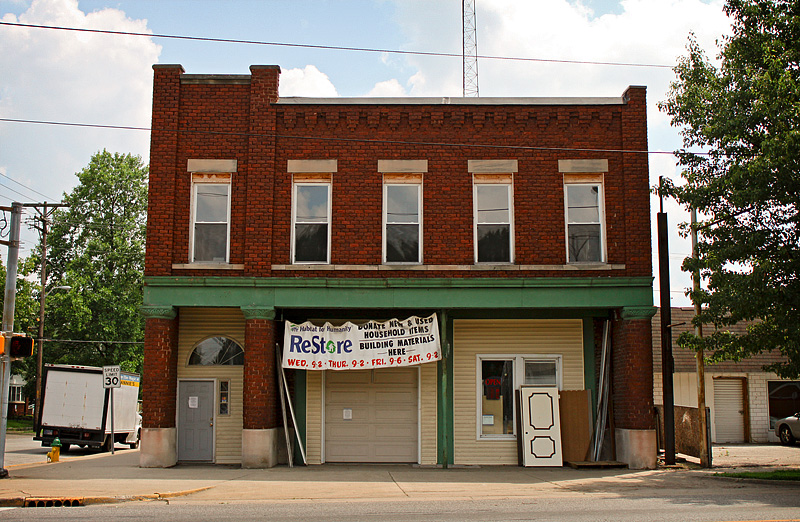
- Terre Haute Fire Station 8, May 2010

- Location within Vigo County, Indiana Location within Indiana Location within the United States
- Location: 1831 Wabash Ave., Terre Haute, Indiana
- Coordinates: 39°28′8″N 87°23′19″W
- Area: less than one acre
- Built: 1906
- Architectural style: Romanesque
- NRHP reference No.: 00000668
- Added to NRHP: June 15, 2000

Terre Haute Fire Station No. 8 is a historic fire station located at Terre Haute, Indiana. It was built in 1906, and is a two-story, Romanesque Revival style brick building on a dressed limestone base. It served as a fire station until 1972.

It was listed on the National Register of Historic Places in 2000.
