= Waynesville Engine House and Lockup =

- U.S. National Register of Historic Places
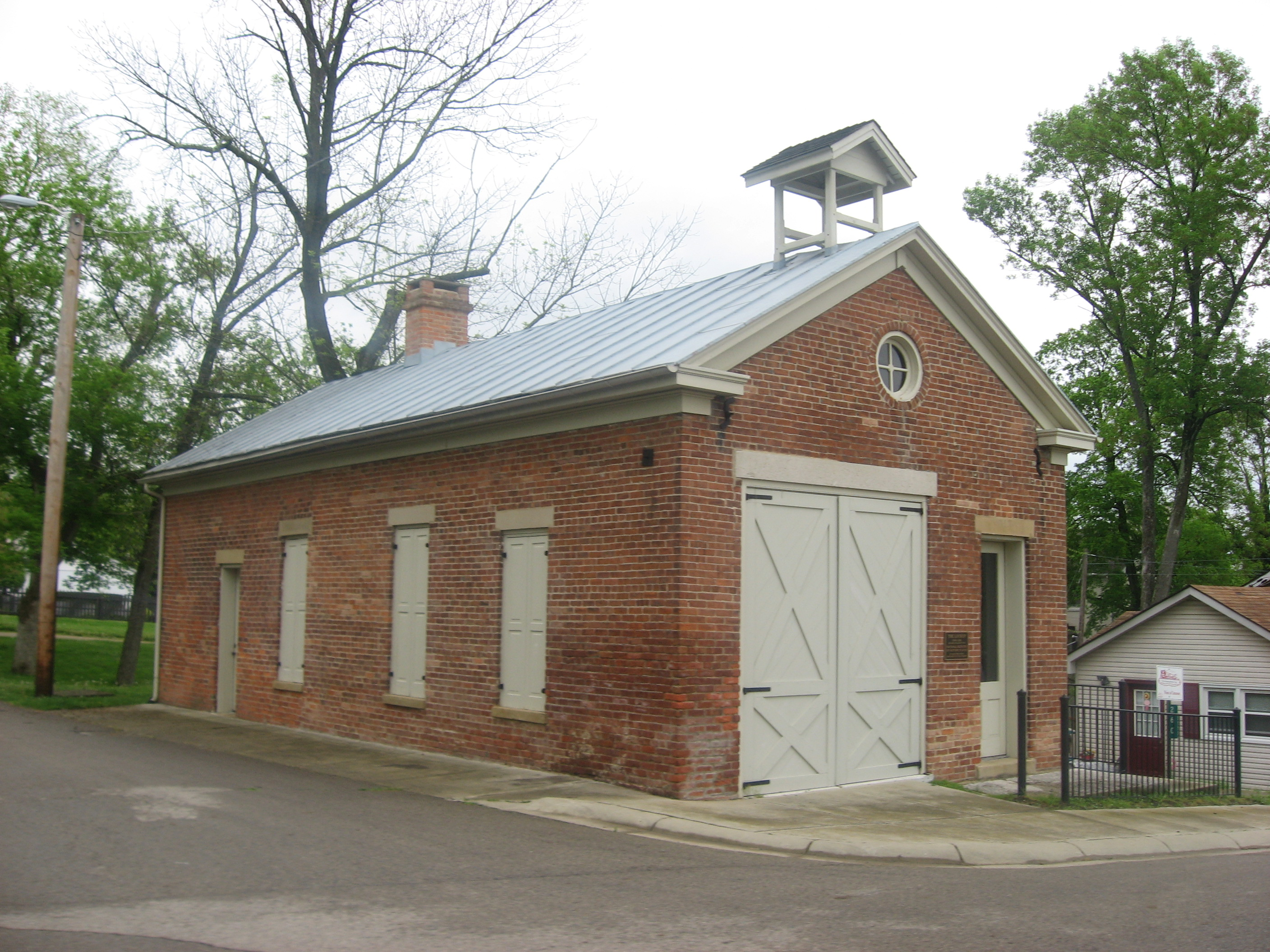

- Location within Ohio
- Location: 260 Chapman St., Waynesville, Ohio
- Coordinates: 39°31′56″N 84°05′08″W
- Area: less than one acre
- Built: 1881
- Architectural style: Classical Revival
- NRHP reference No.: 98001643
- Added to NRHP: January 21, 1999

The Waynesville Engine House and Lockup, at 260 Chapman St. in Waynesville, Ohio, was built in 1881. It was listed on the National Register of Historic Places in 1999. It has also been known as the Waynesville Lockup.

It was built in 1881 as Waynesville's first fire station. A fire truck was purchased in 1886, and in the same year an extension to the rear was added to serve as a jail.

It is not covered in the Ohio Historic Places Dictionary.
