= Engine House No. 3 (Kalamazoo, Michigan) =

- U.S. National Register of Historic Places
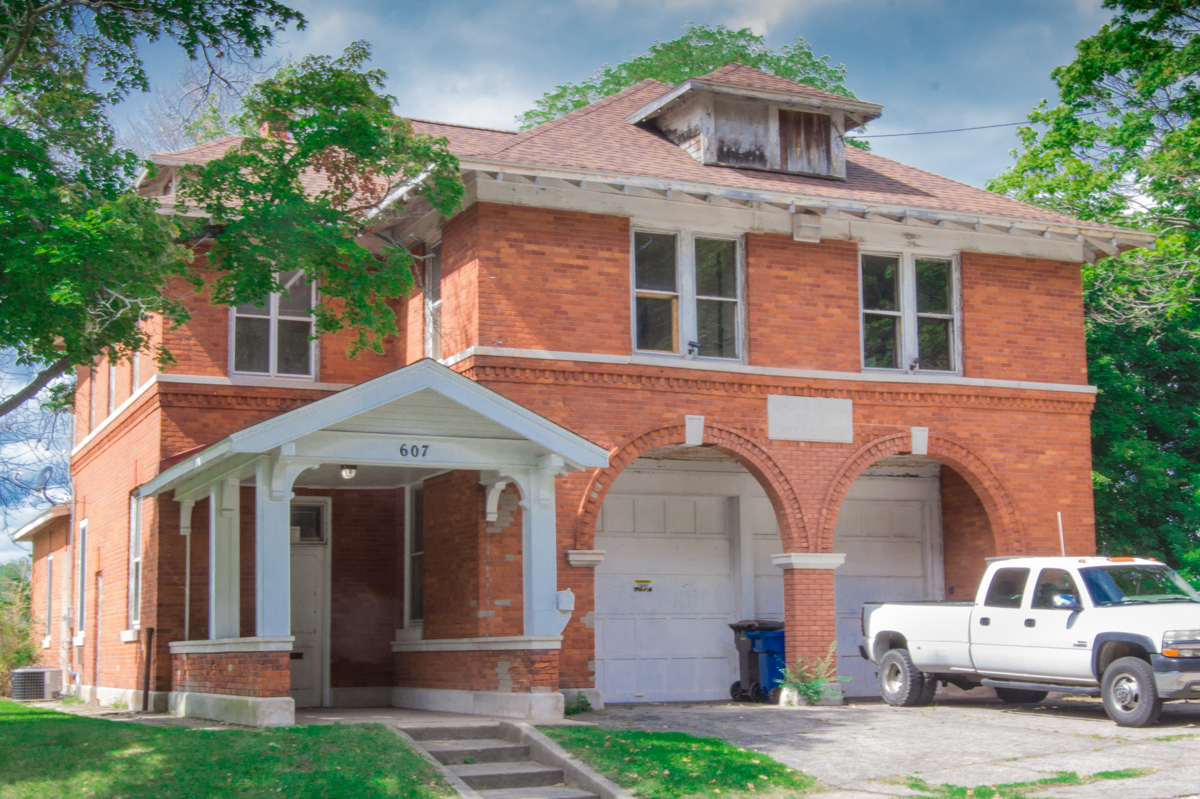
- Interactive map
- Location: 607 Charlotte Ave., Kalamazoo, Michigan
- Coordinates: 42°17′51″N 85°33′52″W
- Area: less than one acre
- Built: 1907
- Architect: F. D. Van Volkenberg
- Architectural style: Prairie School, Bungalow/craftsman
- MPS: Kalamazoo MRA
- NRHP reference No.: 83000857
- Added to NRHP: May 27, 1983

Engine House No. 3 is a former fire station located at 607 Charlotte Avenue in Kalamazoo, Michigan. It was listed on the National Register of Historic Places in 1983.

== History ==
The first Kalamazoo hook and ladder company was established in 1846. By 1854 there were two companies, and the fire department continued to grow. In the early part of the 20th century, a number of new stations were constructed, and by 1910, the city had six stations. Four of these were designed by local architect Forrest D. Van Volkenberg, including Engine House No. 3. This station was constructed between 1907 and 1908, and it was used as a fire station by the city until 1980, when it was sold. As of 2013, the building was vacant.

== Description ==
Engine House No. 3 is a two-story brick structure, built in a Prairie School / Bungalow style that was popular at the time of construction. The architect, Forrest D. Van Volkenberg, designed the station with the local area in mind, and the design echoes that of the surrounding houses. It includes a small front porch similar to the houses in the neighborhood.

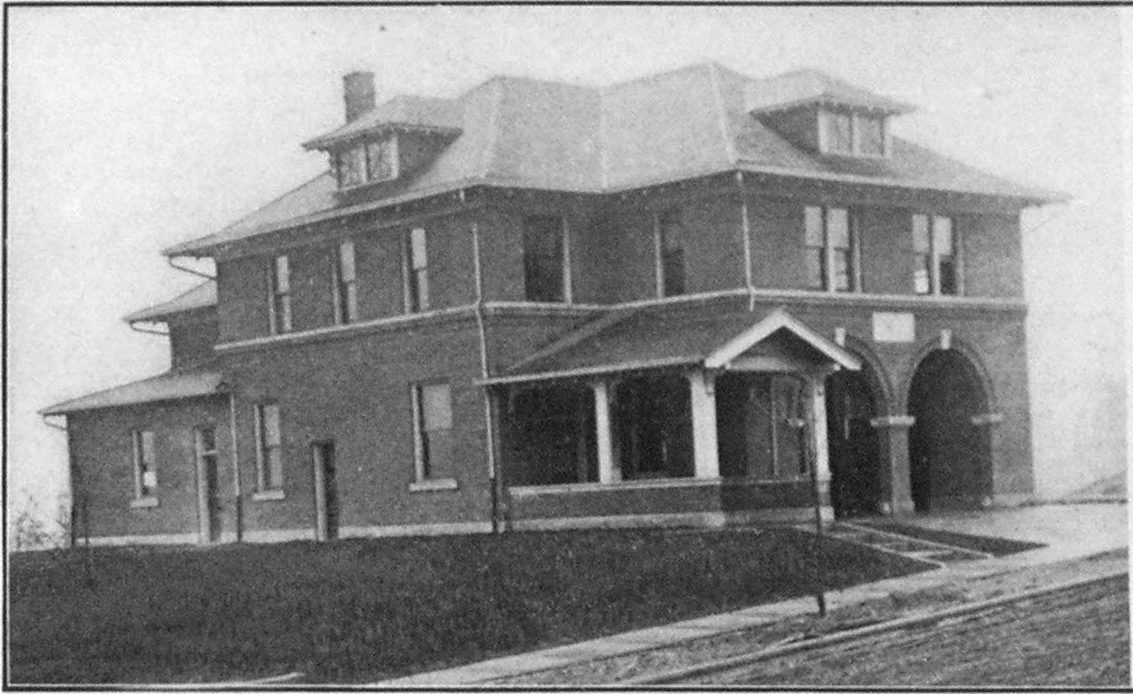
Engine house no 3, in 1910
