= Old Fire House No. 4 (Kalamazoo, Michigan) =

- U.S. National Register of Historic Places
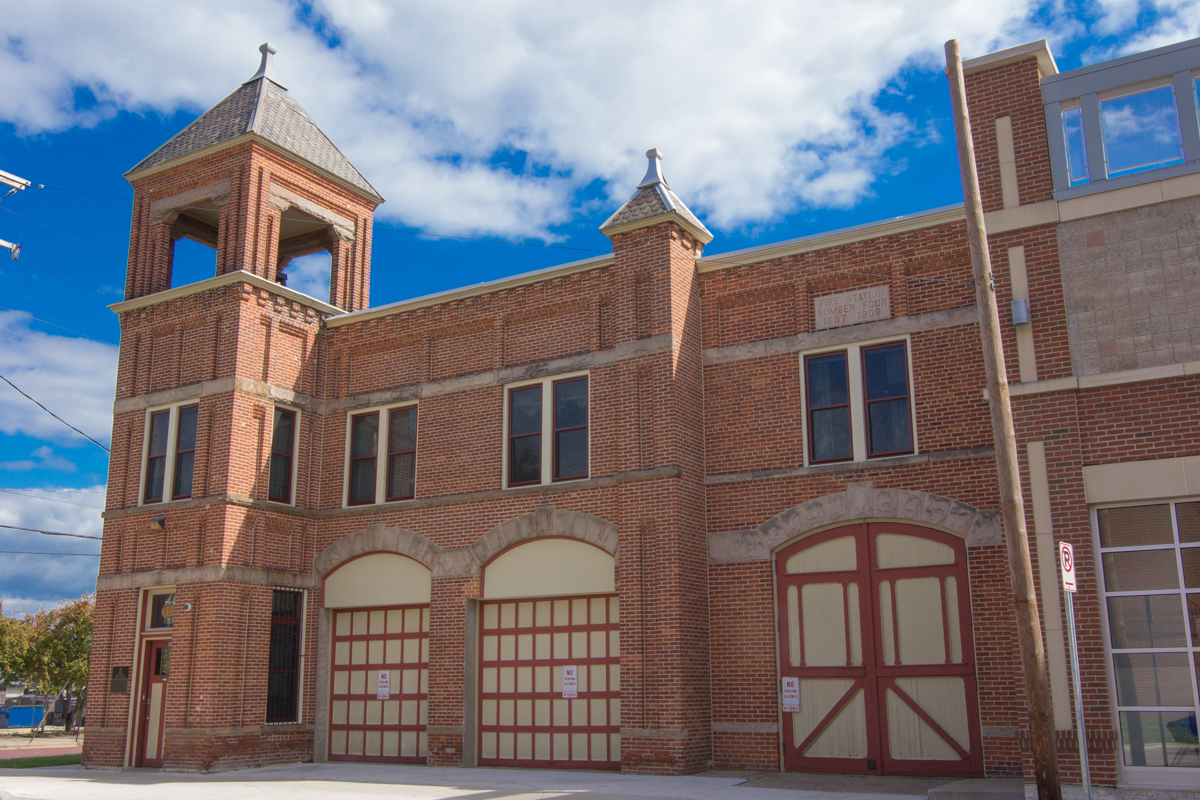
- Interactive map
- Location: 526 N. Burdick St., Kalamazoo, Michigan
- Coordinates: 42°17′50″N 85°34′59″W
- Area: less than one acre
- Built: 1887
- Built by: Alexander Robbins
- Architect: Martin W. Roberts
- Architectural style: Late Victorian
- MPS: Kalamazoo MRA
- NRHP reference No.: 83000867
- Added to NRHP: May 27, 1983

Old Fire House No. 4 is a former fire station located at 526 North Burdick Street in Kalamazoo, Michigan. It was listed on the National Register of Historic Places in 1983.

== History ==
As the north side of Kalamazoo grew in the late 1800s, there was a need for greater fire protection in that part of the city. In 1887, the city purchased land for a new station and hired local architect Martin W. Roberts to design a new station. Contractor Alexander Robbins of Kalamazoo constructed the station, and it was in use by the end of 1887. In 1901, a matching addition on one side of the station was constructed to house a new fire truck. The city used the station until 1956, when it was sold. In the 1980s it was used as a warehouse. It was later refurbished into office space. In 2009, "Rescued Treasures," a thrift store associated with the nearby Kalamazoo Gospel Mission, was constructed adjacent to the building.

== Description ==
Old Fire House No. 4 is a two-story brick Late Victorian structure; the original section is two bays wide. It has a pyramid-roof tower at one corner, and paneled brick detailing.
