= Engine House No. 8 (Baltimore) =

- U.S. National Register of Historic Places
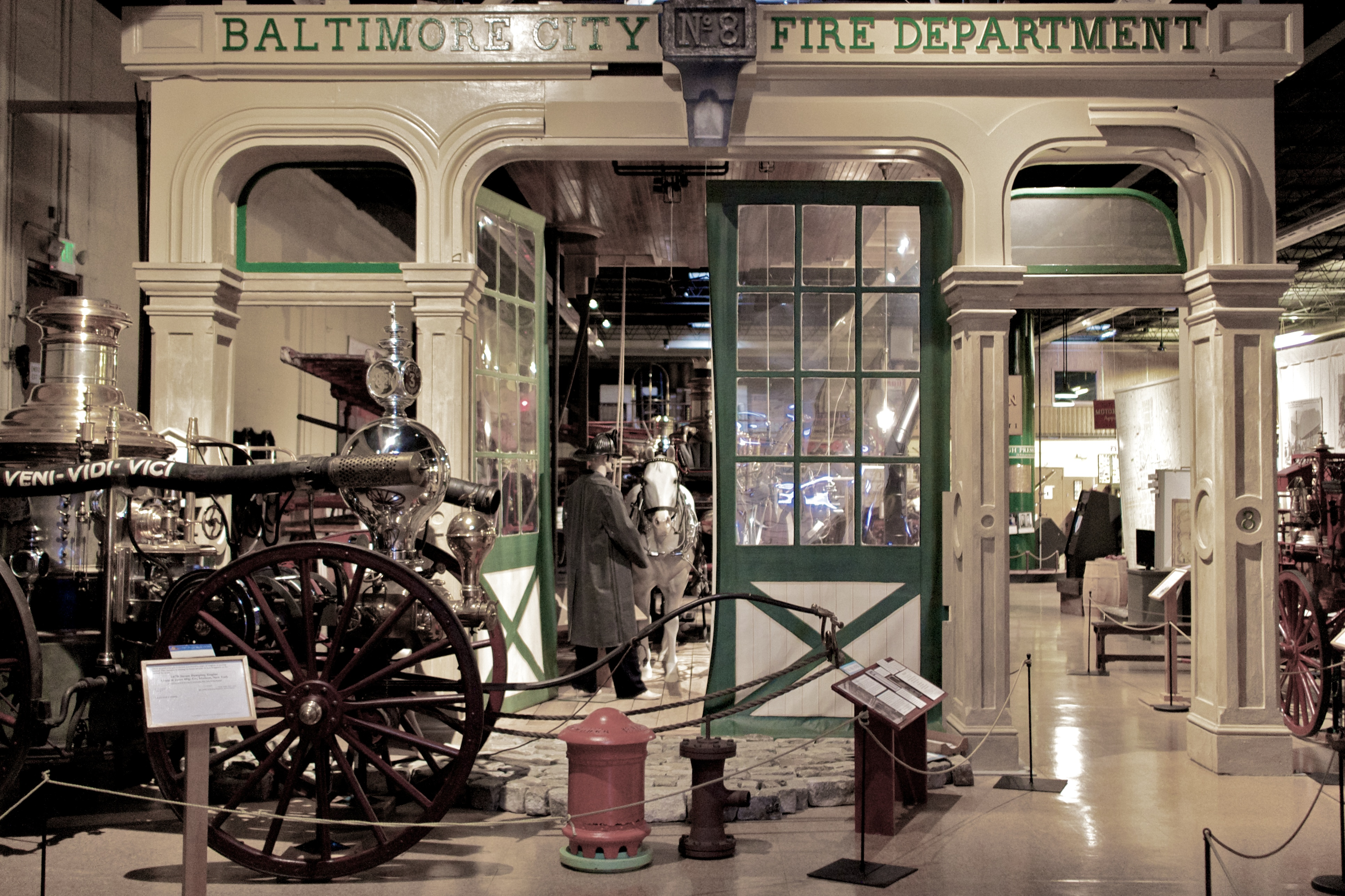
- First floor cast-iron components of the original Engine House No. 8, as displayed at the Fire Museum of Maryland

- Location within Baltimore Location within Maryland Location within the United States
- Location: 1027 W. Mulberry St., Baltimore, Maryland
- Coordinates: 39°17′36″N 76°38′9″W
- Area: less than one acre
- Built: 1871
- Architectural style: Italianate
- MPS: Cast Iron Architecture of Baltimore MPS
- NRHP reference No.: 94001577
- Added to NRHP: January 26, 1995

Engine House No. 8 was a historic fire station located at Baltimore, Maryland, United States. It was a two-story masonry building with a cast-iron street front, erected in 1871 in the Italianate style. The front featured a simple cornice with a central iron element bearing the legend "No. 8". Engine Company No. 8 operated from this building until 1912. In 1928 it became the motorcycle shop of Louis M. Helm and the upper story functioned as a clubhouse for a series of boys’ clubs into the 1940s.

Engine House No. 8 was listed on the National Register of Historic Places in 1995. About 2002, the property was sold and the building was torn down. However, the cast-iron facade was saved, and the first floor cast-iron components were installed at the Fire Museum of Maryland, where the fire house has been put back together.

== See also ==
- Fire departments in Maryland
- Engine House No. 6 (Baltimore, Maryland)
- Paca Street Firehouse
- Poppleton Fire Station
