= Tigerton Village Hall and Engine House =

- U.S. National Register of Historic Places
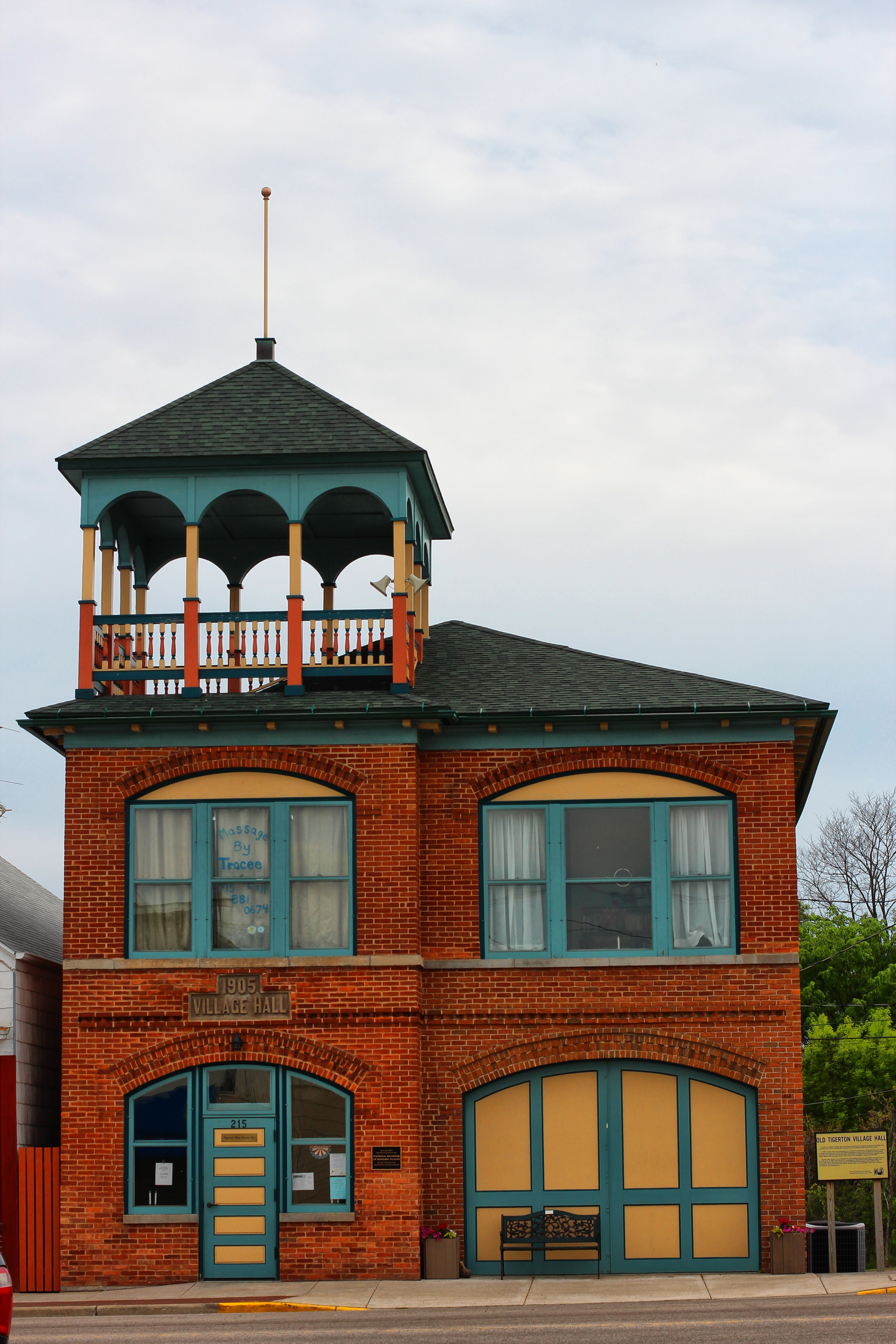
- Nearest city: Tigerton, Wisconsin
- Coordinates: 44.74024°N 89.06255°W
- Built: 1905
- Architect: Charles Miller
- NRHP reference No.: 08001036
- Added to NRHP: November 5, 2008

The Tigerton Village Hall and Engine House is a municipal building built in 1906 in Tigerton, Wisconsin. Built with the support of Herman Swanke's Tigerton Lumber Company, it was placed close to that lumber company's mill to protect it from fire. The building also served as a community center, housing both government offices and social functions. In 2008 it was added to the National Register of Historic Places.

The forest that would become Shawano County had been developed for logging ever since 1843, when Charles Wescott and Samuel Farnsworth paddled up the Wolf River. In 1879, Frederick Rhinelander's Milwaukee Lakeshore & Western Railroad reached the site on the Embarrass River that would become Tigerton. The town was platted, mills opened to process the wood coming from the surrounding forest, and the community grew.

In 1887 Herman Swanke and some partners built a sawmill two and a half miles west of Tigerton on the Embarrass River. They named their enterprise the Tigerton Lumber Company Corporation, and that mill operated until 1891, when it burned. After that disaster, they moved the sawmill to Tigerton town, and expanded it. In 1896 Swanke bought out his partners to become sole owner. His mill was producing 15,000 to 20,000 feet of lumber per day by that time. In 1897 he opened a company store in Tigerton.

The village of Tigerton was incorporated in 1896. In 1904, the village board decided to construct a town hall and engine house. Charles Wojahn, a member of the site selection committee, offered to sell the town one lot. H.R. Swanke offered to sell a different lot near his mill for $675. He would also clean the lot, and he would lend the village money for the project at 5% interest. Controversy ensued, with several votes before Swanke's offer was accepted. Charles Miller designed the structure, for $25. Swanke won the bids for construction: $485 for the foundation, and $2,870 for the building if green joists were selected, or $2,920.80 if dry joists.

The building is two stories, with a low-pitched hip roof topped with a broad square bell tower in one corner. The building sits on a fieldstone foundation. Above that, walls are wood frame clad in a red brick veneer. The windows are topped with decorative segmental brick arches. Inside the ground-level double door is a fire engine garage. Other rooms were used for village offices, council chambers, a polling area, and a social hall. The building also contained two steel jail cells.

In 1913 the village created the Tigerton Library, and it initially located in an unheated room in the Village Hall and Engine House. By 1922, interest had waned and the library was deteriorating, so its books were merged into the library at Tigerton High School. In 1929, with renewed interest, the separate village library was revived in the Village Hall, and books were moved back from the high school.

The library and village offices remained in the old Village Hall until 1969, when the safety and accessibility of the second floor became an issue. Then the library and some offices moved to an adjacent building. In 1980, the remaining functions moved to a new Village Hall. After that, the old Village Hall was used for storage for years, until the village sold it in 1994.

In 2003 Tigerton Main Street bought the building, put a new roof on it, rebuilt the bell tower, and restored the arch above the truck door. The building now houses offices of Tigerton Main Street, and is rented out for social functions.
