= Engine House No. 9 (Tacoma, Washington) =

- U.S. National Register of Historic Places
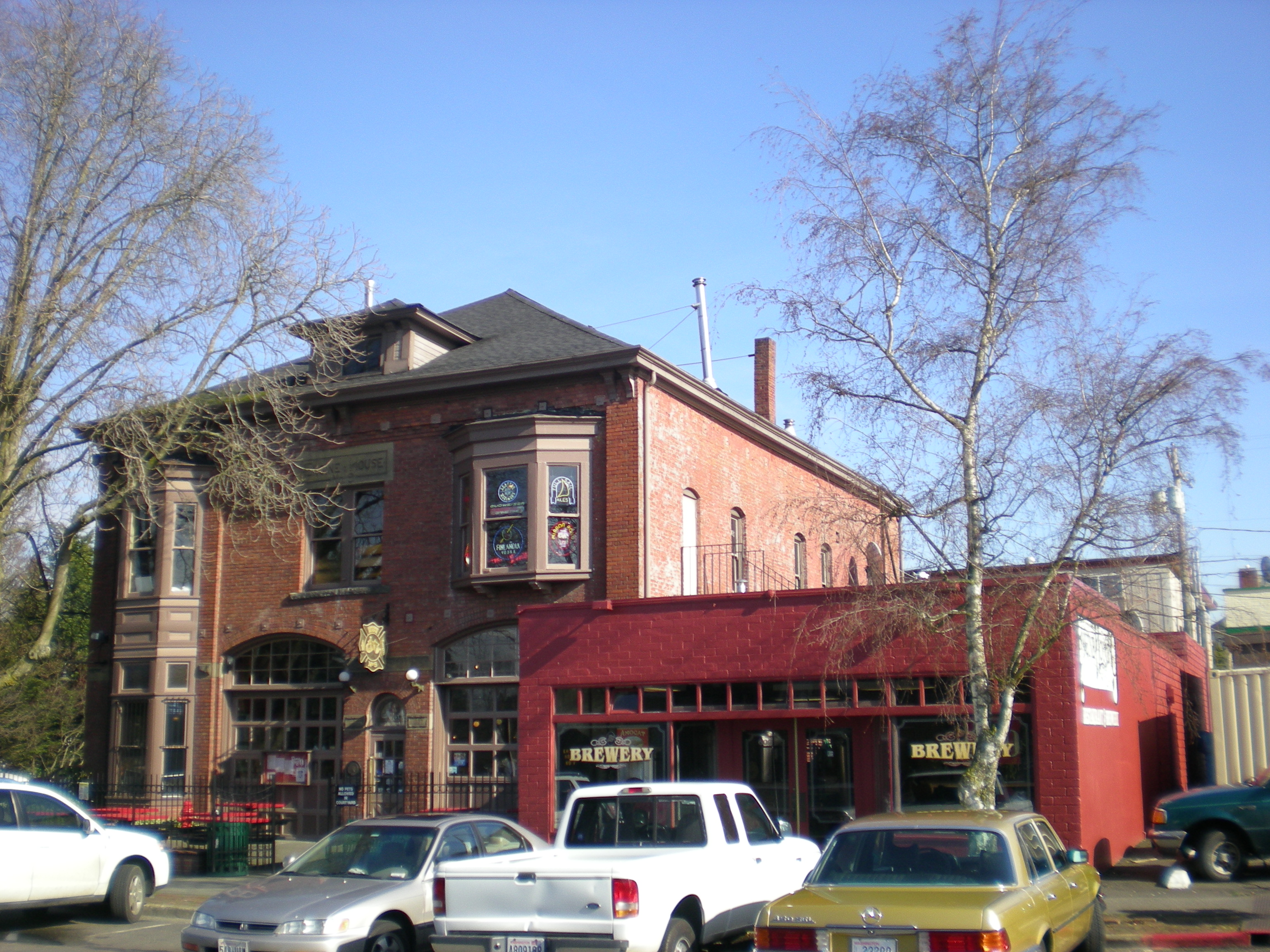

- Location within Washington (state)
- Location: 611 N. Pine St., Tacoma, Washington
- Coordinates: 47.25595°N 122.47331°W
- Built: 1907
- NRHP reference No.: 75001866
- Added to NRHP: July 30, 1975

Engine House No. 9 in Tacoma, Washington, is a fire station built in 1907. The building was placed on the National Register of Historic Places in 1975.

It hosted horse-drawn fire equipment from 1908 until the first motorized equipment was bought in 1919. When eventually a replacement station was being completed, the 1965 Puget Sound earthquake shook the building and it was abruptly abandoned. It was reopened in 1973 as a restaurant and bar and was "the city's first historic building to be restored and put to a commercial use by private enterprise."

The building remains a neighborhood restaurant and also houses an award-winning microbrewery of the same name.
