= Warwood Fire Station =

- U.S. National Register of Historic Places
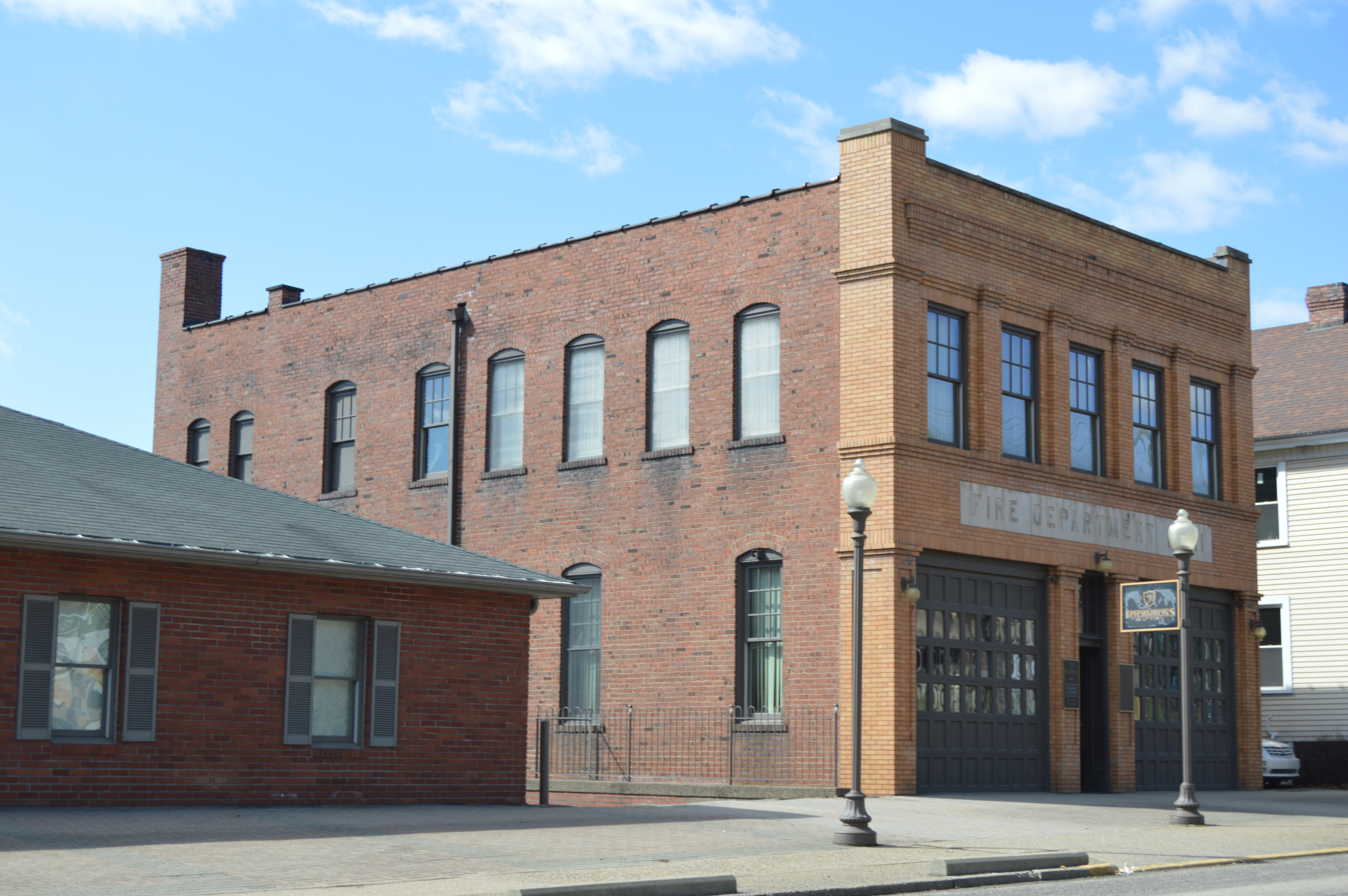
- Southern side and front

- Location within West Virginia Location within the United States
- Location: 1609 Warwood Ave., Wheeling, West Virginia
- Coordinates: 40°7′4″N 80°41′56″W
- Area: less than one acre
- Built: 1923
- Architectural style: Classical Revival
- NRHP reference No.: 96000440
- Added to NRHP: May 2, 1996

Warwood Fire Station is a historic fire station located at Wheeling, Ohio County, West Virginia. It was built in 1923, and is a two-story, rectangular brick building in the Classical Revival-style. The three-bay front facade has two garage openings with a single center entrance. Its entablature is a centered limestone panel incised with "FIRE DEPARTMENT NO. 11."

It was listed on the National Register of Historic Places in 1996.
