= Engine House No. 28 (Buffalo, New York) =

- U.S. National Register of Historic Places
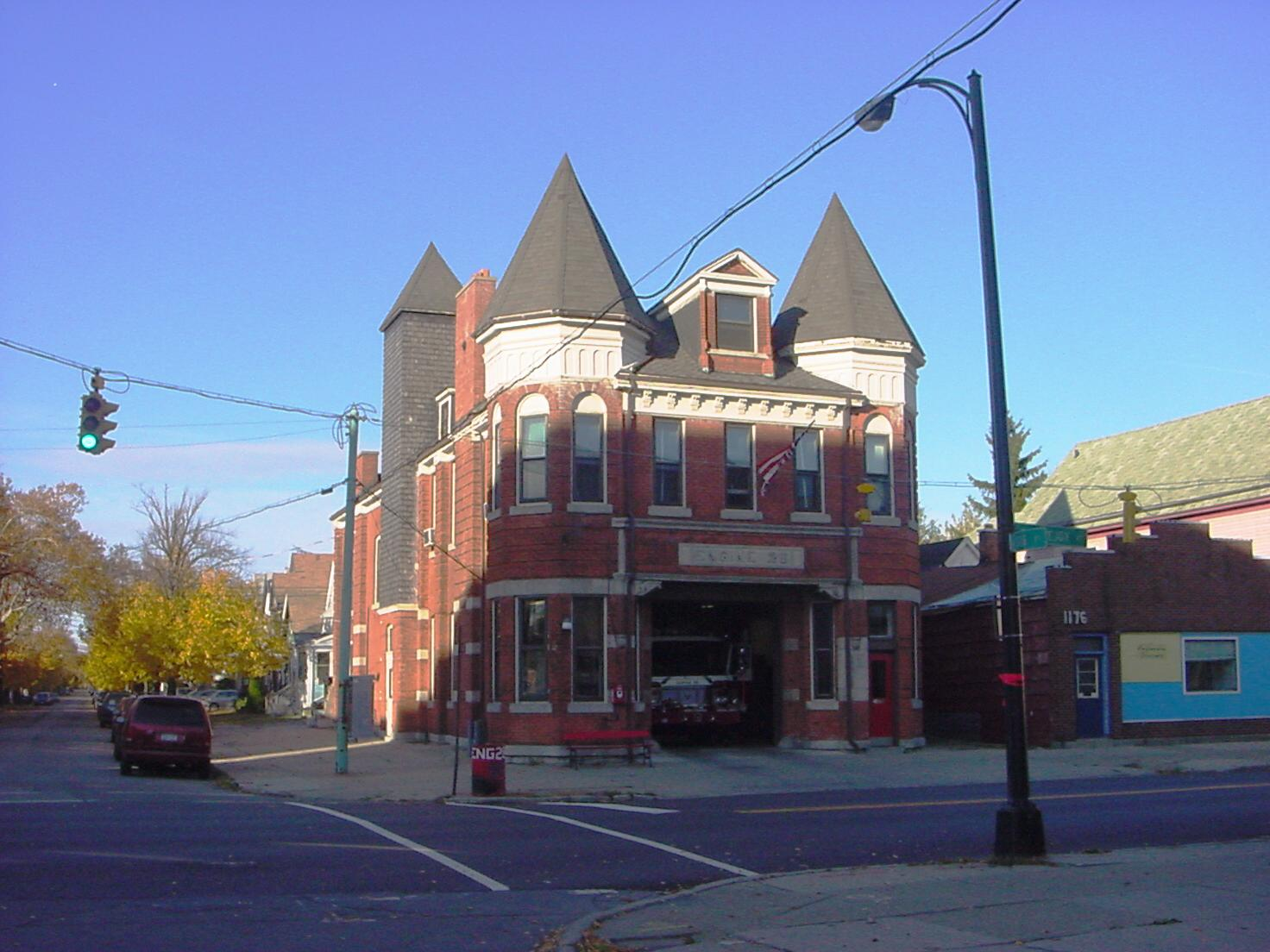

- Location within New York Location within the United States
- Location: 1170 Lovejoy St., Buffalo, New York
- Coordinates: 42°53′23″N 78°48′18″W
- Area: 0.1 acres (0.040 ha)
- Built: 1897
- Architect: Mohr, Frederick; Watson and McGuinness
- Architectural style: Queen Anne
- NRHP reference No.: 01000554
- Added to NRHP: May 25, 2001

Engine House No. 28 is a historic fire station building located at Buffalo in Erie County, New York. It is a Queen Anne style structure built in 1897.

It was listed on the National Register of Historic Places in 2001.
