= Fire Station No. 4 (Des Moines, Iowa) =

- U.S. National Register of Historic Places
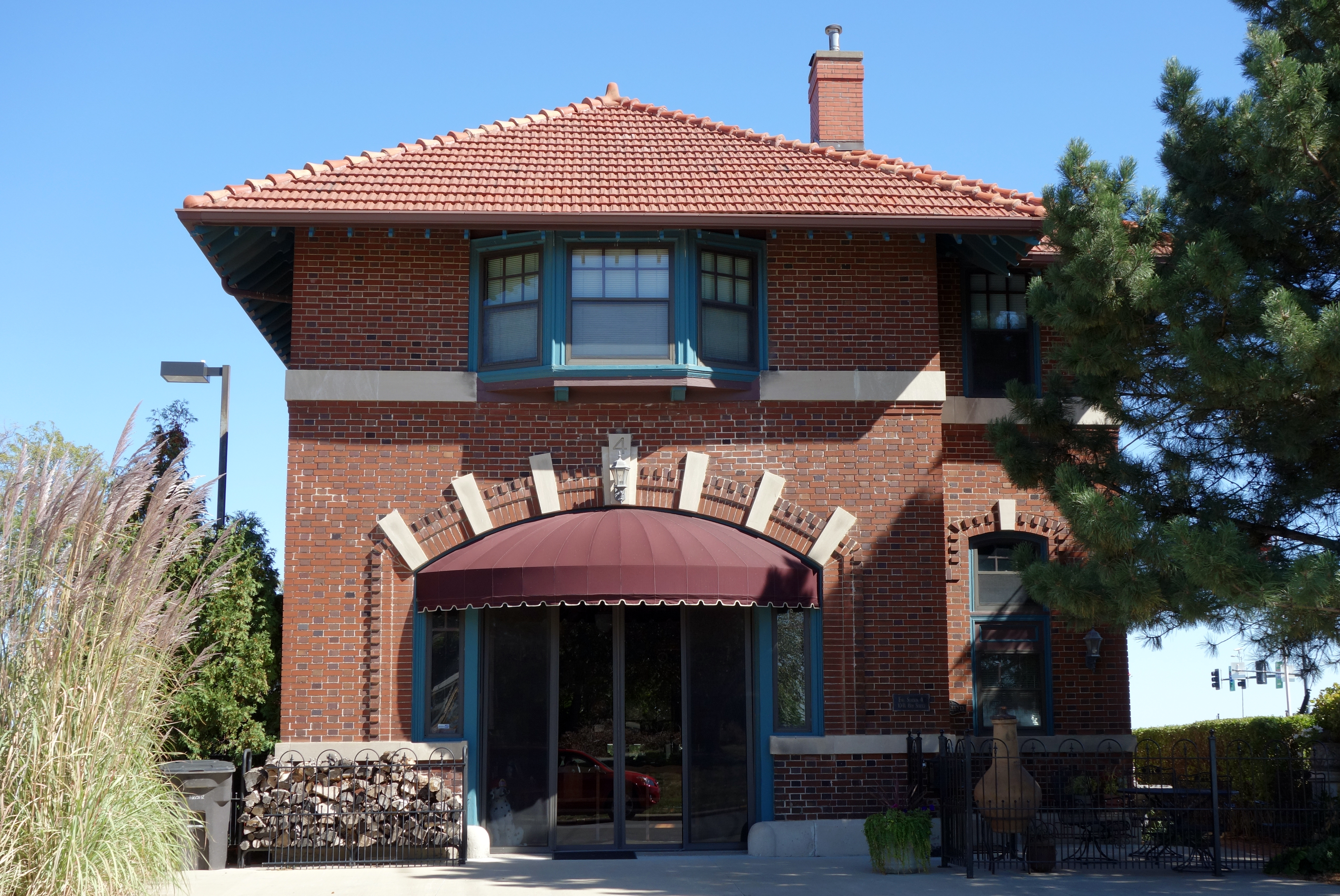

- Location within Iowa Location within the United States
- Location: 1041 8th St., Des Moines, Iowa
- Coordinates: 41°35′47.4″N 93°37′40.1″W
- Area: less than one acre
- Built: 1896
- NRHP reference No.: 79000923
- Added to NRHP: June 27, 1979

Fire Station No. 4 is a historic building located in Des Moines, Iowa, United States. This is one of a small group of fire stations built in the city around the turn of the 20th century, and one of the earliest local examples of this building type. It was completed about 1896, and it has an addition on the east side that was built in 1962. The two-story brick structure features a tiled hip roof, stone beltcoursing, a projecting bay window on the main facade on second floor, and a Gibbs surround with stone voussoirs that surround the main entrance. The building was listed on the National Register of Historic Places in 1979.
