= Engine House No. 4 (Tacoma, Washington) =

- U.S. National Register of Historic Places
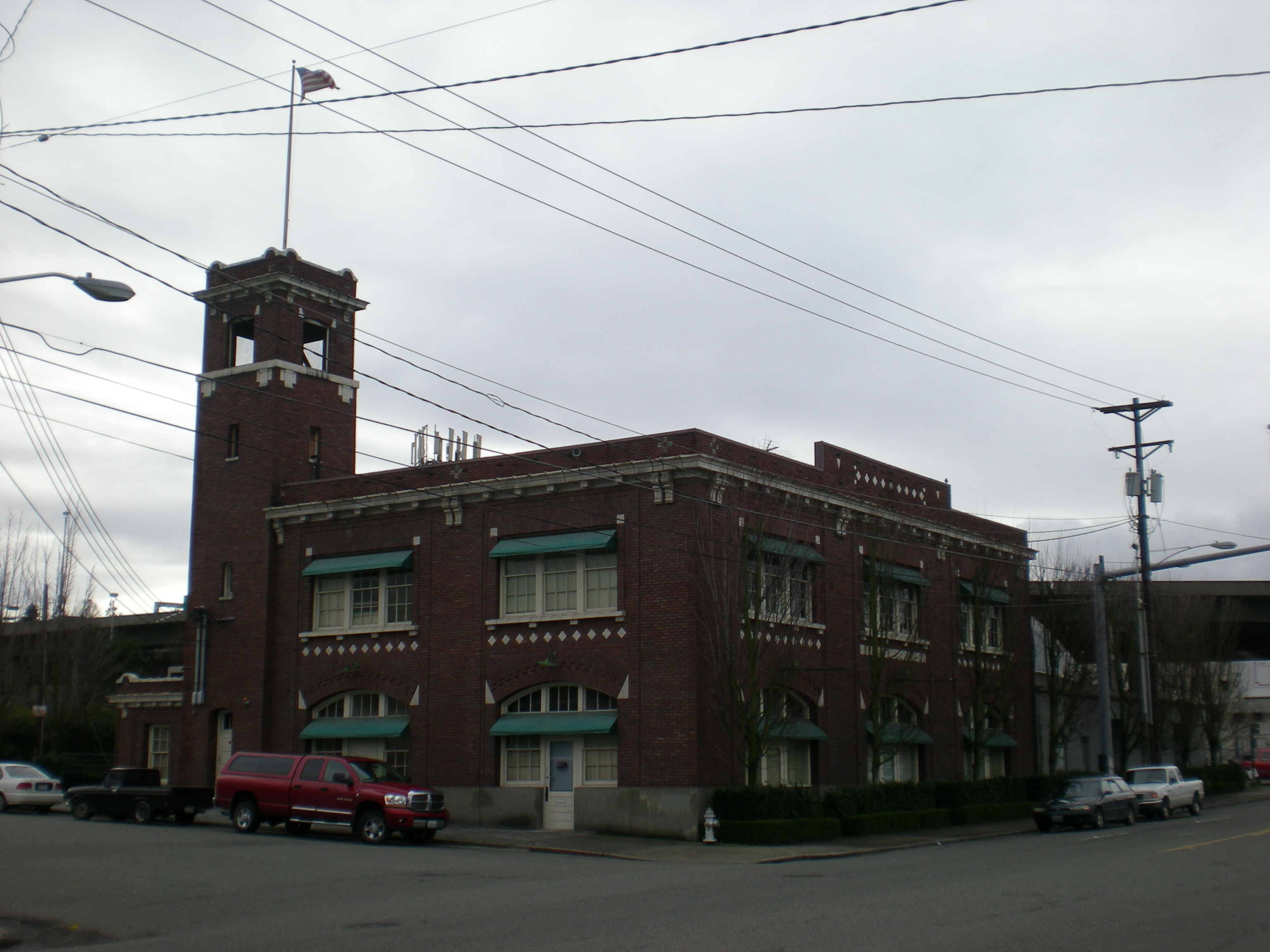

- Location within Washington (state) Location within the United States
- Location: 220-224 E. 26th St., Tacoma, Washington
- Coordinates: 47°14′19″N 122°25′45″W
- Area: less than one acre
- Built: 1911
- Architect: Shaw, Frederic
- NRHP reference No.: 84002425
- Added to NRHP: October 18, 1984

The Engine House No. 4 in Tacoma, Washington, at 220-224 E. 26th St., was built in 1911. It was listed on the National Register of Historic Places in 1984.

It is a two-story brick building with "classically inspired terra cotta details", and it has a salient four-story hose tower. It was designed by architect Frederic Shaw.

It is no longer in service as a fire station. In 2008 it was used by the City of Tacoma's traffic signal division. It is currently the union hall for United Food and Commercial Workers local 367.
