= Engine House No. 11 (Tacoma, Washington) =

- U.S. National Register of Historic Places
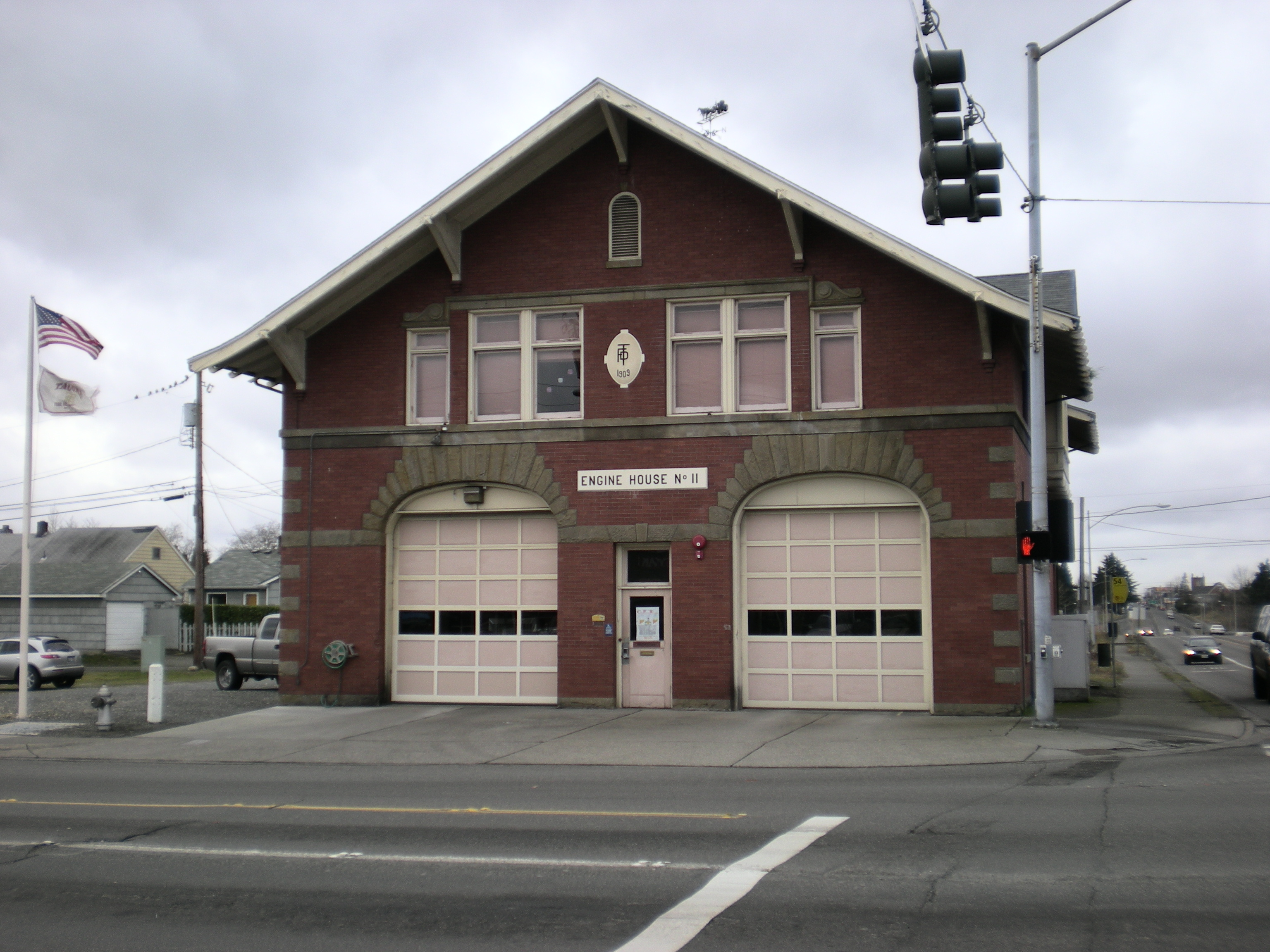

- Location within Washington (state)
- Location: 3802 McKinley Ave., Tacoma, Washington
- Coordinates: 47°13′23″N 122°25′11″W
- Area: less than one acre
- Built: 1909
- Built by: C.A. Opperman, contractor
- Architect: City Engineer`s Office
- MPS: Historic Fire Stations of Tacoma, Washington TR
- NRHP reference No.: 86000965
- Added to NRHP: May 2, 1986

The Engine House No. 11 in Tacoma, Washington, also known as Fire Station No. 11, at 3802 McKinley Ave., was built in 1909. It was listed on the National Register of Historic Places in 1986.

It has a flared gable roof.

In 1985, it was still an active fire station.

== In popular culture ==
The facade of this firehouse is the basis for the exterior shots of the firehouse on the television series Tacoma FD.
