= Mechanics Engine House No. 4 =

- U.S. National Register of Historic Places
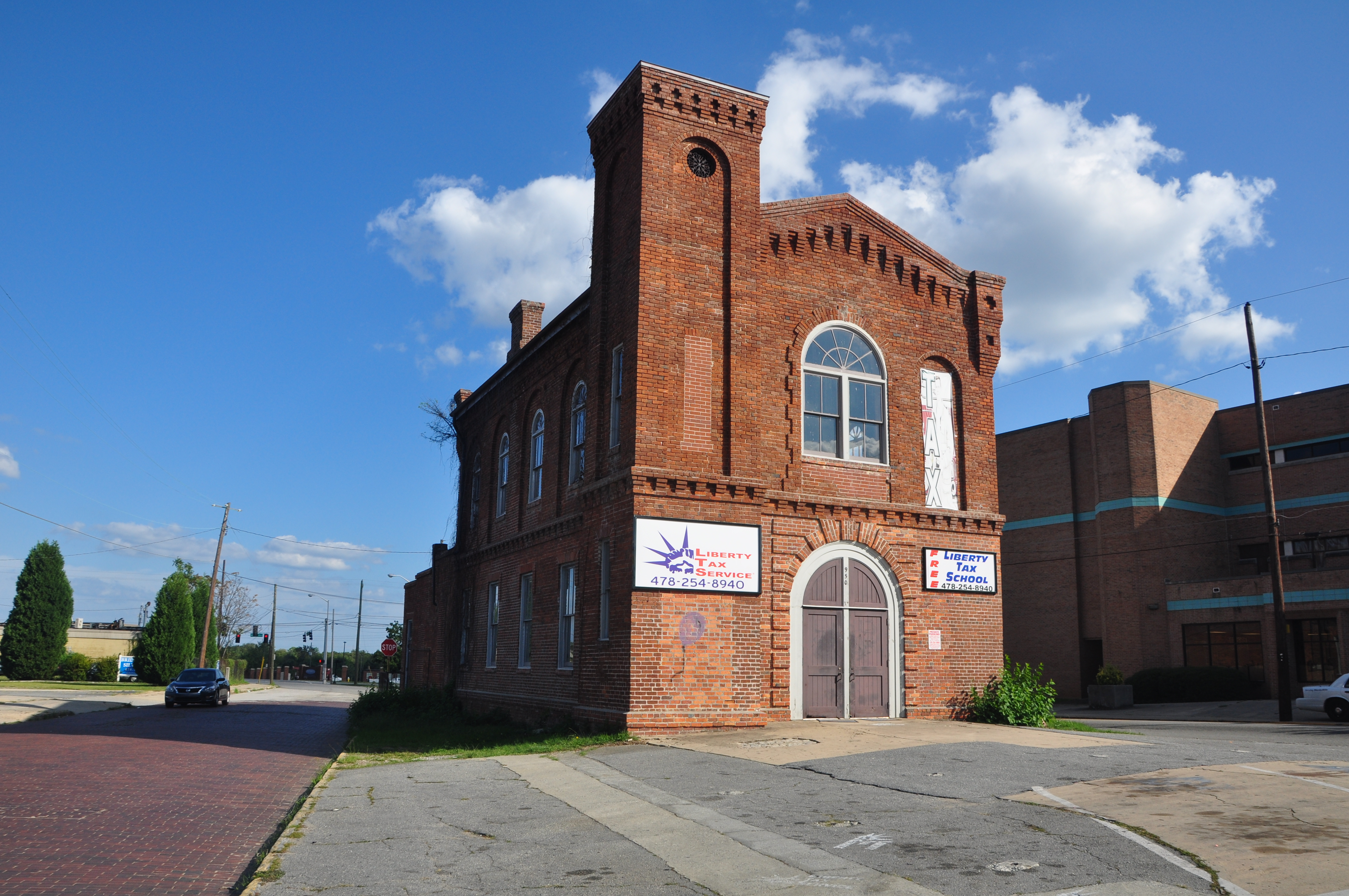

- Location within Georgia
- Location: 950 Third St., Macon, Georgia
- Coordinates: 32°49′43″N 83°37′58″W
- Area: less than one acre
- Built: 1870
- Architectural style: Italianate
- NRHP reference No.: 90001434
- Added to NRHP: September 13, 1990

Mechanics Engine House No. 4, also known as Fire Engine Company House No. 4, at 950 Third St. in Macon, Georgia was built around 1870. It was listed on the National Register of Historic Places in 1990.

It was used by volunteer firefighters from c.1870 to 1890, then by professionals until 1930.
