= Engine House No. 6 (Wichita, Kansas) =

- U.S. National Register of Historic Places
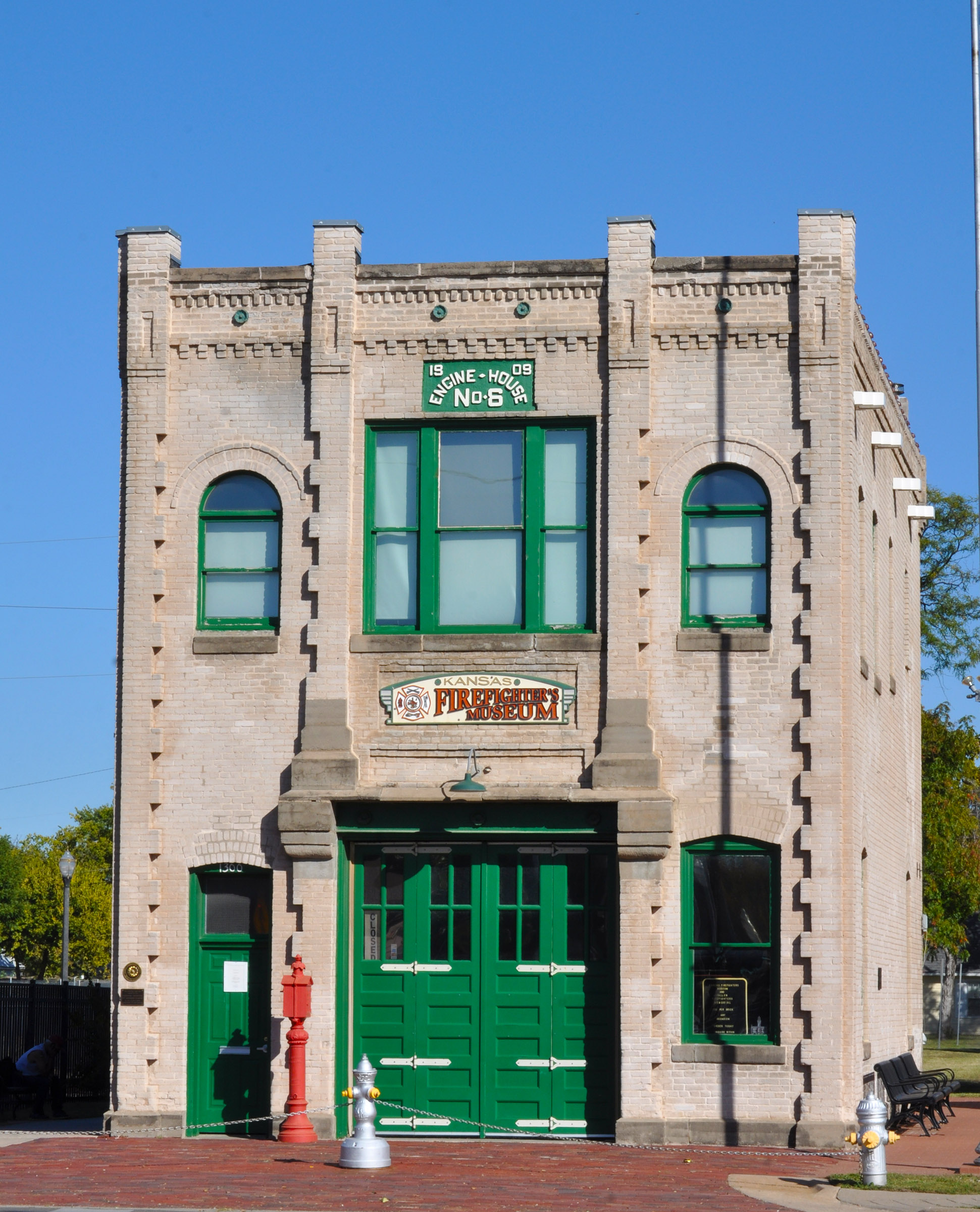

- Location within Kansas
- Location: 1300 S. Broadway, Wichita, Kansas
- Coordinates: 37°40′11″N 97°20′06″W
- Area: Less than one acre
- Built: 1909
- Built by: Wolters, J.C.
- Architectural style: Tudor Revival
- NRHP reference No.: 94001623
- Added to NRHP: February 2, 1995

The Engine House No. 6 in Wichita, Kansas, at 1300 S. Broadway, is a fire station which was built in 1909. It was listed on the National Register of Historic Places as "Engine House #6" in 1995.

It is a two-story concrete brick building, 26 by 51 feet (7.9 m × 15.5 m) in plan, with Tudor Revival-esque features.

It was operational until 1953 when a replacement was built.

The building was saved from demolition in 1993 by a community preservation alliance. The preservation alliance restored the building. The building then became the Kansas Firefighters Museum, and a year later in 1994 was placed on both the Kansas and National Registers of Historic Places.
