= Engine House No. 8 (Tacoma, Washington) =

- U.S. National Register of Historic Places
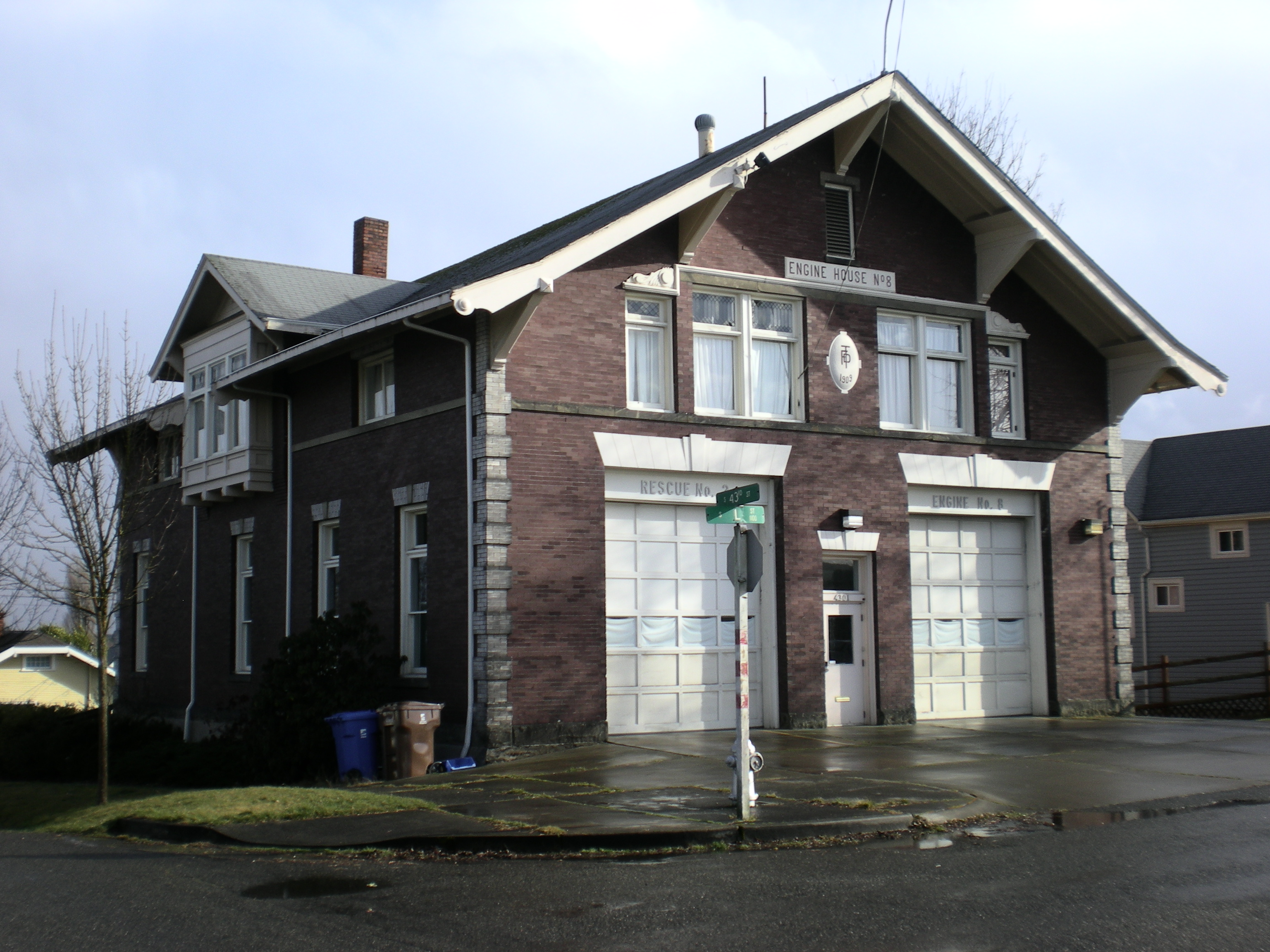

- Location within Washington (state) Location within the United States
- Location: 4301 S. L St., Tacoma, Washington
- Coordinates: 47°13′06″N 122°26′52″W
- Area: less than one acre
- Built: 1909
- Built by: John Huntington, contractor
- Architect: City Engineer`s Office
- MPS: Historic Fire Stations of Tacoma, Washington TR
- NRHP reference No.: 86000968
- Added to NRHP: May 2, 1986

The Engine House No. 8 in Tacoma, Washington, which has also been known as Fire Station No. 8, was built in 1909. Located at 4301 S. L St., it was listed on the National Register of Historic Places in 1986.

It was designed to be compatible with its residential neighborhood: "The fire station possesses a distinctly domestic scale that seeks to harmonize the building with its residential neighbors. Its blocky mass, together with its flared gable roof, wide eaves and knee braces imitate the form of Craftsman style "chalets" that were a very popular residential type in Tacoma at this time."

This station was replaced in 2006 with a larger facility, and is now a private residence.
