= Number 4 Hook and Ladder Company =

- U.S. National Register of Historic Places
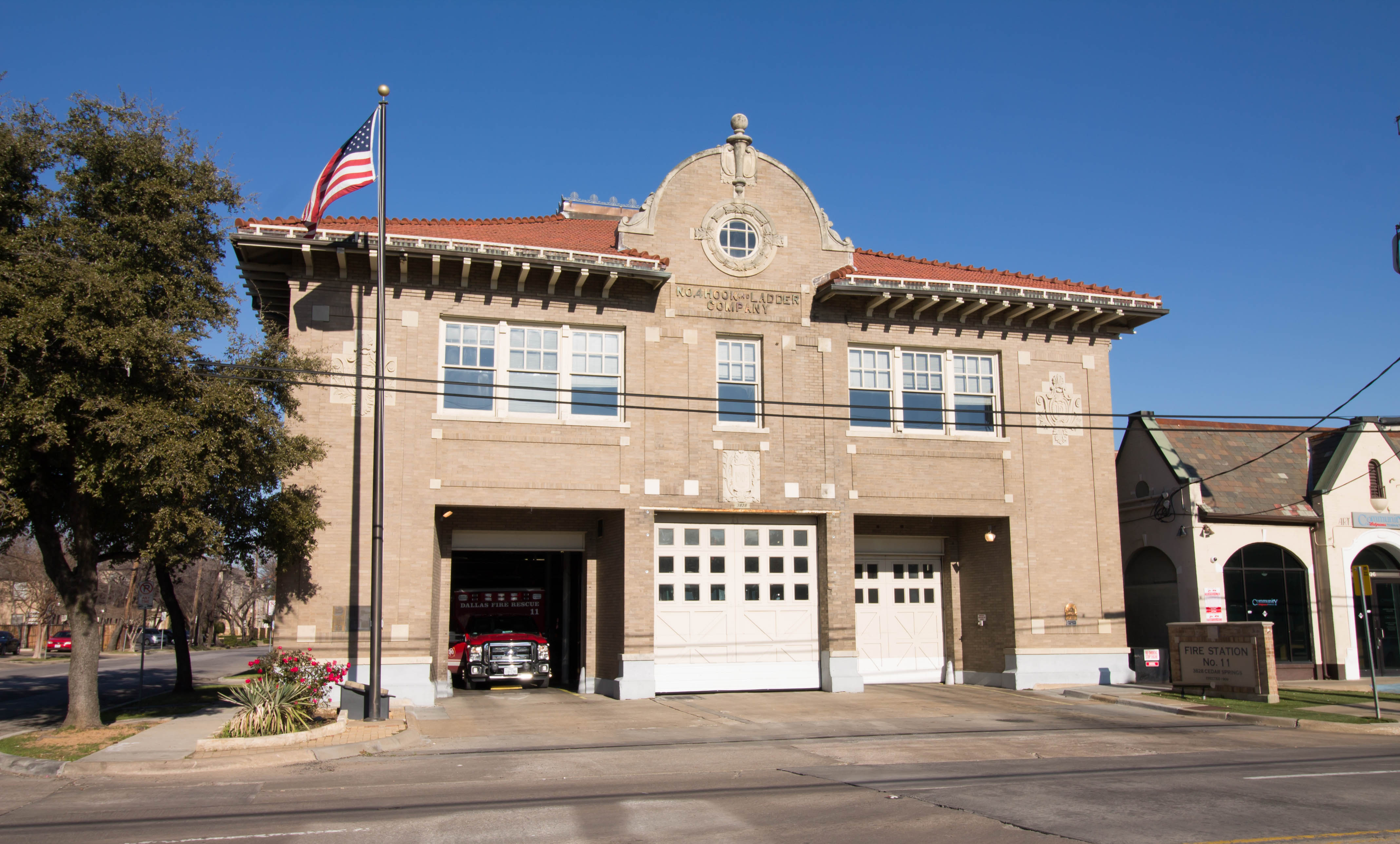

- Location within Texas Location within the United States
- Location: Cedar Springs Rd. and Reagan St., Dallas, Texas
- Coordinates: 32°48′35″N 96°48′32″W
- Area: 1 acre (0.40 ha)
- Built: 1909
- Architect: Herbert M. Greene
- Architectural style: Prairie School, Mission/spanish Revival
- NRHP reference No.: 81000627
- Added to NRHP: May 4, 1981

The Number 4 Hook and Ladder Company in Dallas, Texas, located at Cedar Springs Rd. and Reagan St., was built in 1909. It has also been known as the Oak Lawn Fire Station and as Fire Station No. 11. It was listed on the National Register of Historic Places in 1981.

It is notable as the first "suburban" fire station in Dallas. It is a two-story building designed by prominent Dallas architect Herbert M. Greene, and is one of the last public buildings in Dallas designed in the Prairie School style. It also includes elements of Mission/Spanish Revival style.
