= Engine House No. 6 (Baltimore) =

Historic fire station in Maryland, US

- U.S. National Register of Historic Places
- Baltimore City Landmark
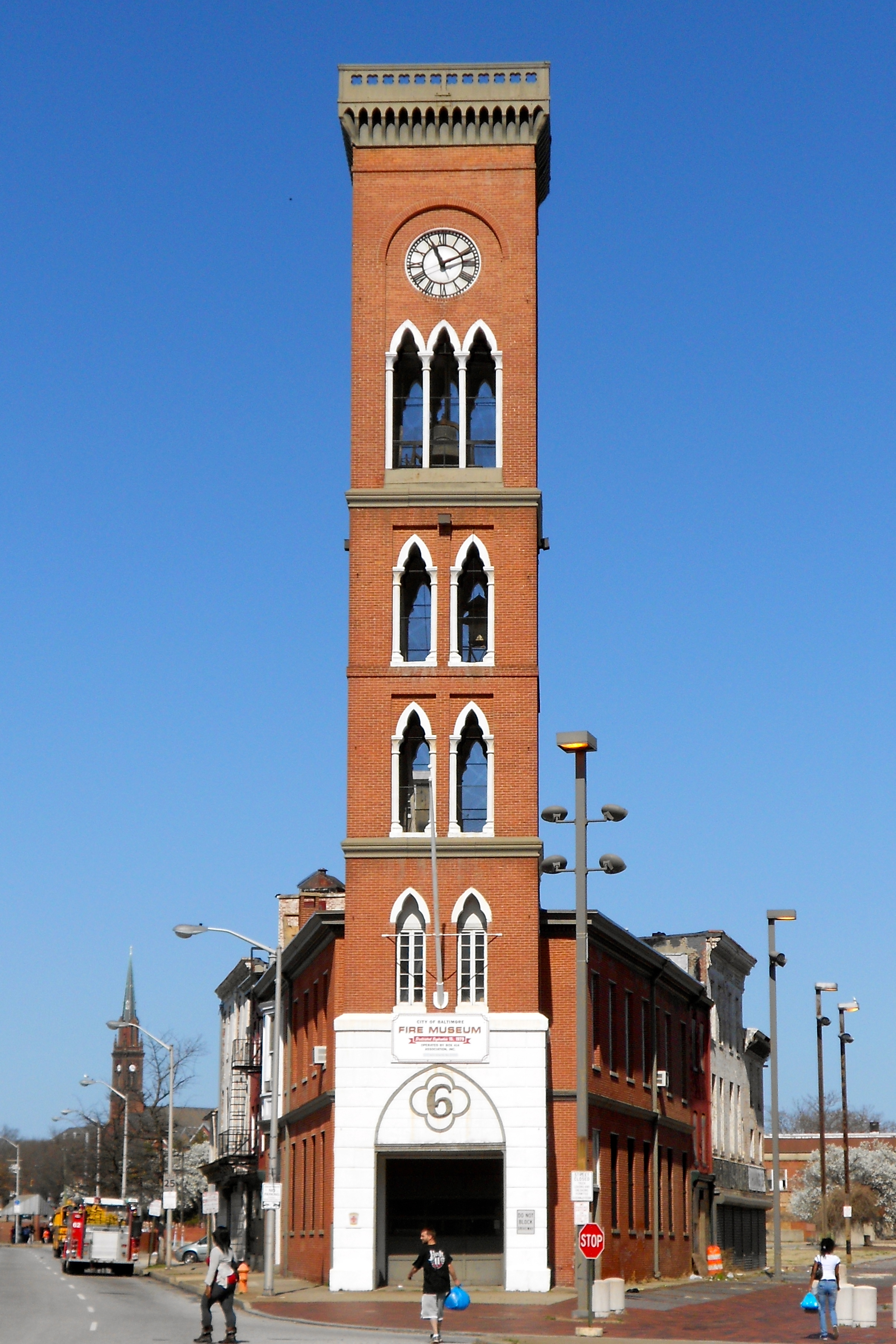
- Fire station tower
- Interactive map of Engine House No. 6
- Location: 414 N. Gay St., Baltimore, Maryland
- Coordinates: 39°17′43″N 76°36′20″W
- Area: 1 acre (0.40 ha)
- Built: 1853
- Architect: Reasin & Wetherald
- Architectural style: Gothic Revival, Italian Gothic
- NRHP reference No.: 73002185

Significant dates
- Added to NRHP: June 18, 1973
- Designated BCL: 1975

Engine House No. 6 is a historic fire station located at Baltimore, Maryland, United States. This two-story brick building features a 103-foot Italian-Gothic tower at the apex of its truncated triangular shape. It was built in 1853–54, and the tower is said to be a copy of Giotto's campanile in Florence, Italy.

Engine House No. 6 was listed on the National Register of Historic Places in 1973.

The building is now home to the Baltimore City Fire Museum, operated by Box 414 Association housing a collection of historic fire equipment and artifacts. The building also serves as their headquarters on the second level since 1979.

== See also ==
- Fire departments in Maryland
- Engine House No. 8 (Baltimore, Maryland)
- Paca Street Firehouse
- Poppleton Fire Station
