= Engine House No. 11 (Detroit) =

- U.S. National Register of Historic Places
- Michigan State Historic Site
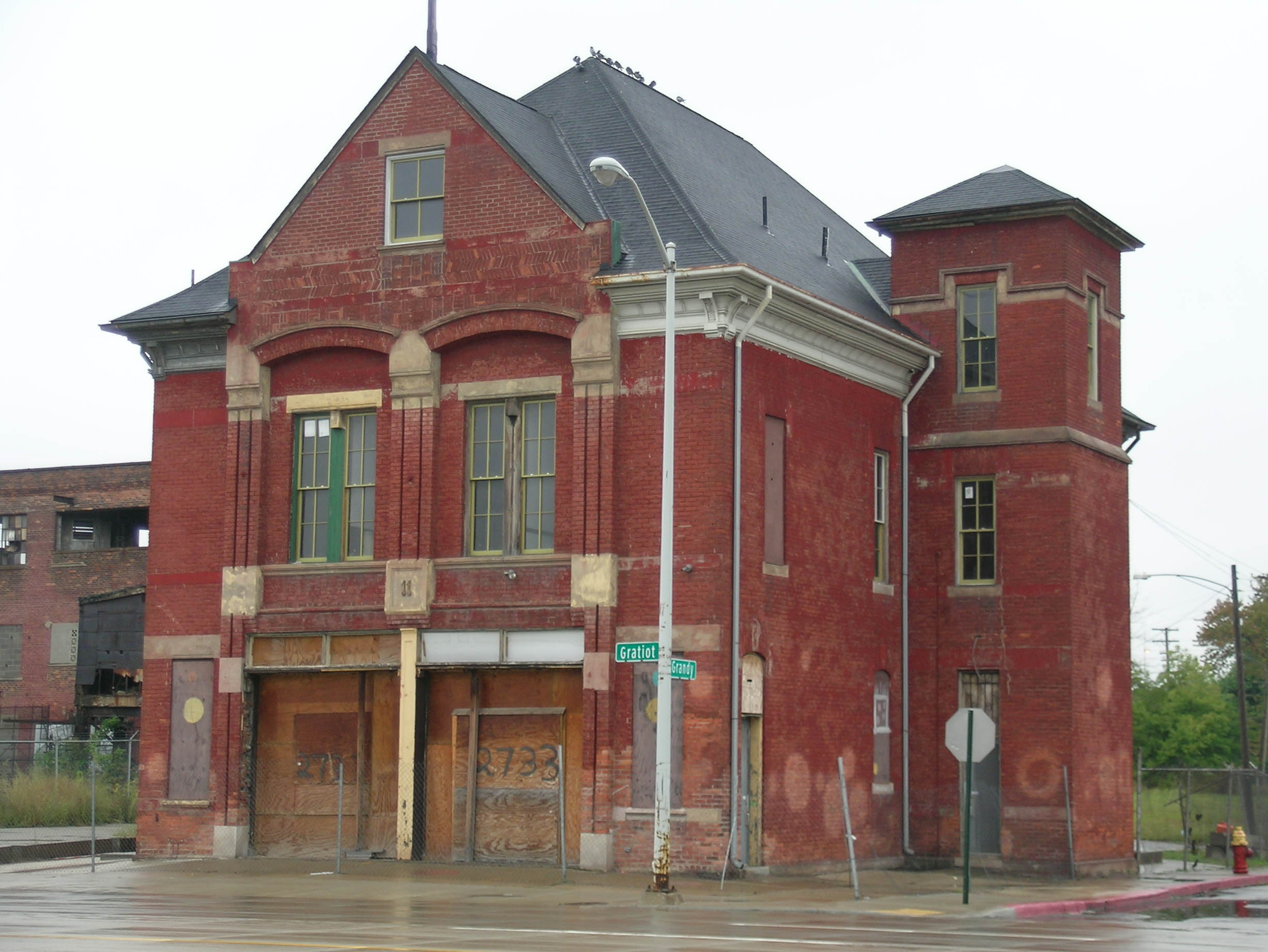
- Interactive map
- Location: 2737 Gratiot Avenue; Detroit, Michigan
- Coordinates: 42°21′16″N 83°1′53″W
- Built: 1883
- Built by: Gascione & Sons
- Architect: William Scott & Company
- Architectural style: Queen Anne
- NRHP reference No.: 78001519

Significant dates
- Added to NRHP: January 9, 1978
- Designated MSHS: May 14, 1975

The Engine House No. 11 is a fire station located at 2737 Gratiot Avenue in Detroit, Michigan. It is the oldest remaining firehouse in the city of Detroit; it was designated a Michigan State Historic Site in 1975 and listed on the National Register of Historic Places in 1978.

== History ==
According to the September 9, 1883, edition of the Detroit Free Press, William Scott & Company was the architect of the building. Detroit's Engine Company No. 11 was organized as the "Steam Fire Engine Company #11" on January 1, 1884. The original equipment included a horse-drawn Silsby Steam engine and hose reel cart. The company converted to motorized operation in 1916, obtaining a Seagrave gasoline propelled pumping engine.

The firehouse tower on the southeast side of the building was shortened during World War II so an air raid siren could be installed. In 1972, Engine Company No. 11 moved to new quarters. The building was used by the Emergency Medical Unit until 1976, and then as a Detroit Fire Department museum, containing several pieces of historic fire fighting equipment.

== Description ==
Engine House No. 11 is a 2 1/2-story brick building with a hipped roof. The front facade contains a wide center section flanked by two small bays. The first story of the center section contains four wide doors, the second story has two large windows. A dormer atop the center section contains the attic story. A hose-drying tower is centered on the east side of the building. This tower had an air raid siren installed during World War II, which reduced its height somewhat.

On the interior, the first floor contains the apparatus room, kitchen, dining area and a lounge. The walls are wainscoted, and the ceiling is plastered. The second floor contains a dormitory style sleeping quarters, showers, locker room, and two private sleeping rooms for the Captain and Lieutenant. At the rear of the dormitory, but on a slightly lower level, is a room that was originally the hay loft, but has been turned into a recreation room.
