= Engine House No. 13 (Tacoma, Washington) =

- U.S. National Register of Historic Places
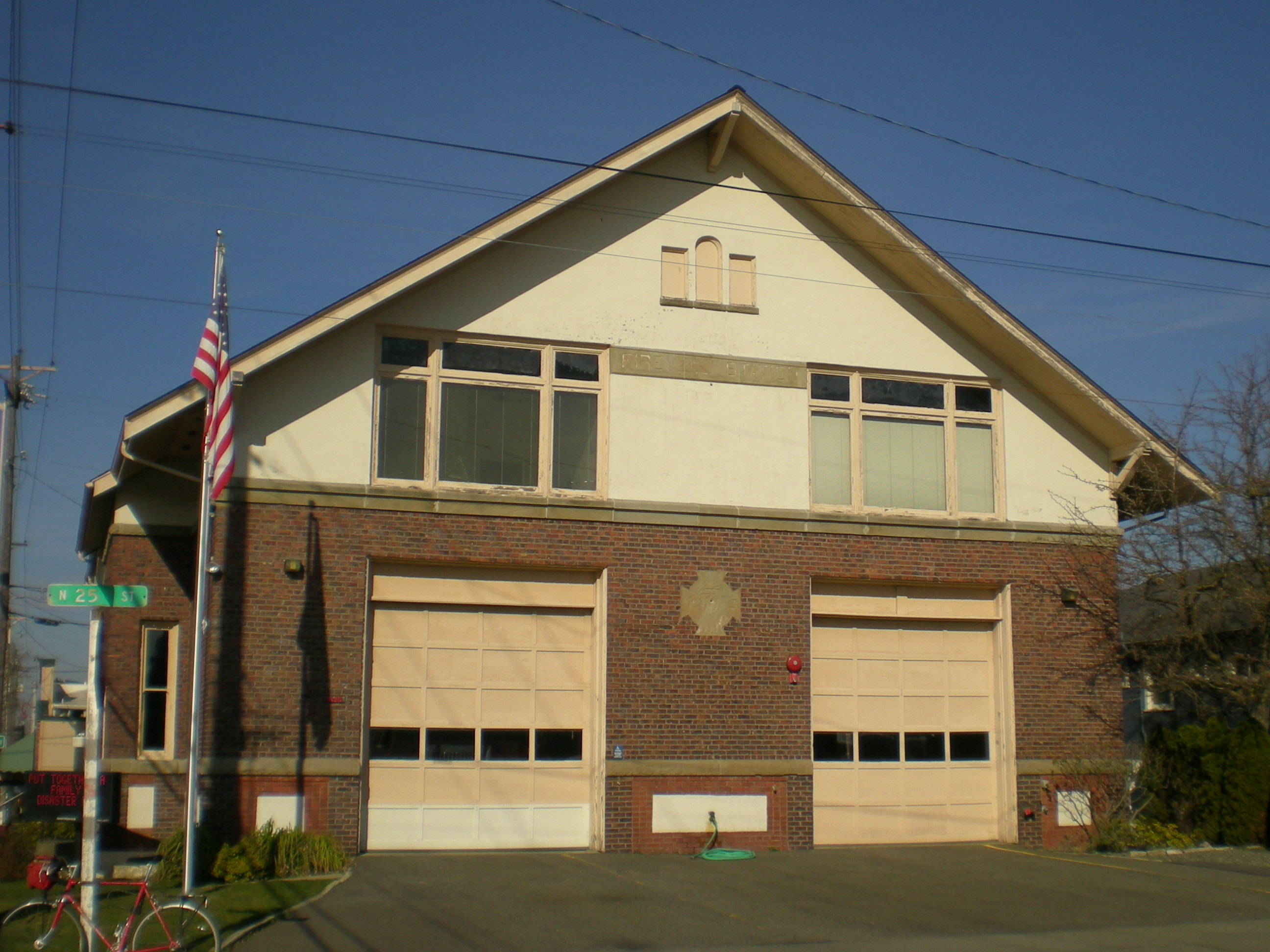

- Location within Washington (state) Location within the United States
- Location: 3825 N. Twenty-fifth St., Tacoma, Washington
- Coordinates: 47°16′14″N 122°29′15″W
- Area: less than one acre
- Built: 1911
- Built by: Department of Public Works
- Architect: City Engineer's Office
- MPS: Historic Fire Stations of Tacoma, Washington TR
- NRHP reference No.: 86000964
- Added to NRHP: May 2, 1986

The Engine House No. 13 in Tacoma, Washington, at 3825 N. Twenty-fifth St., is a fire station, which was built in 1911. It was listed on the National Register of Historic Places in 1986.

It has red brick walls, with brick laid in stretcher bond. The second floor exterior was stuccoed.

In 1985, this was still an active fire station.

The fire station remains in active use and features equipment from multiple eras. Major changes include the removal of its hose tower—once used to dry canvas hoses—and interior modifications like the loss of its original fireplace, which heated water for steam pumps in the early 1900s. On January 20, 1993, the Inauguration Day Storm tore off nearly a quarter of the roof, which was later replaced.
