= Richmond Fire Station =

Former fire station in Melbourne, Victoria, Australia

- Location within Melbourne
- Interactive map of the Richmond Fire Station area

General information
- Architectural style: Victorian
- Location: 131 Lord Street, Richmond, Yarra City, Melbourne, Victoria, Australia
- Coordinates: 37°49′28″S 145°00′16″E
- Opened: 6 May 1893; 133 years ago
- Owner: Metropolitan Fire Brigade (1893–c. 1966)

Technical details
- Material: Red brick
- Floor count: 2

Design and construction
- Architect: J. A. B. Koch

The Richmond Fire Station is a former fire station, located at 131 Lord Street in Richmond, an inner-city suburb of Melbourne, in Victoria, Australia. The former fire station was built in 1893 and was operated by the Melbourne Metropolitan Fire Brigade.

== Description ==
=== Historical use ===
It is a two-storey red brick building designed in the late-Victorian style by J. A. B. Koch. When it was built, the building was considered important "because it incorporated a fire services system similar to those which were used in America"; it was reported that it has "'a very imposing appearance, and is replete with the latest fire-fighting appliances. Electricity plays a leading part in the new service. By simply connecting the current by the merest pressure of a button, or pulling a cord, open fly the main doors, the horse rushes out of the stable, and backing itself into the horse-cart, is harnessed in full going order within 20 seconds. With such a marvellously perfect system, ought we not to henceforth feel secure against the devastating elements of fire.'"

The building is a particularly simple and bold late Victorian composition and is an unusual and prominent local heritage element on a corner in an otherwise predominantly residential area. The building was designed by prominent Melbourne architect and former Richmond councillor and mayor, J. A. B. Koch.

The building was added to the local heritage register of the City of Yarra on an unknown date.

=== Contemporary use ===
Converted to a four-bedroom residence in c. 1966, the building was sold at auction for $3.335 million in December 2016.

== See also ==
- Richmond Metropolitan Fire Station
- Architecture of Melbourne
