= John A. B. Koch =

Australian architect (1845–1928)

John Augustus Bernard Koch (1845-1928) was a Melbourne (Victoria, Australia) architect who practiced between 1869 and 1913. He also became mayor of Richmond near Melbourne.

== Life and career ==
Koch was born in Hamburg in August 1845 and migrated to Australia with his family in 1855. He was educated and trained as an architect in Melbourne and served his articles with F. M. White. He became White's assistant until 1873 when he started his own practice. In 1871 he married Anna Puttmann at the German Lutheran Trinity Church at Eastern Hill (East Melbourne) where they were active members of the congregation. They had a family of six sons and three daughters. In 1873 he was appointed as Architect to the City of Melbourne and designed a number of market buildings. In 1887 he was appointed Architect for the City of Richmond. He took an active interest in professional and community affairs. He was active in the R.V.I.A., served as a Councillor in the City of Richmond for eight years and served as Mayor from 1882 to 1883.

Koch ceased practice in 1913 and his fifth son, Bernard, carried on his practice. He died in Hawthorn, Victoria in August 1928. He is buried in Boroondara Cemetery.

His best known for the highly elaborate mansion Labassa (now National Trust owned), an extensive enlargement of an earlier house in 1889-1890 in Caulfield North, and Friesia, a single storey house of 1888 with an arcaded porch on three sides at 23 Isabella Grove, Hawthorn, built for Melbourne's first German consul William A Brahe. Most of his work was in Hawthorn and Richmond.

== Selected projects ==
The following is a selected list of Koch's architectural projects.

Project	Image	Date	Location	Description	Notes
Castlemaine Hospital		1869	Castlemaine	demolished	
Castlemaine Hospital Nurses’ Home		c. 1870	2 Edward Street, Castlemaine		
Hay Market, Horse, Cow and Pig markets and Corn Exchange		1873	Cnr. Flemington Rd and Elizabeth St, Melbourne	demolished	
House		1873	38 Stanley St, Richmond	Residence for J. A. B. Koch	
E.S.& A. Bank		1874	Cnr. Church and Swan Streets, Richmond	demolished	
Richmond Temperance Hall		1874	316 Church St, Richmond		
South Richmond Free Library		1880	417 Church St, Richmond	demolished	
Terrace houses		1884	23, 25, 27 Shakespeare Grove, Hawthorn		
The Herald Office			30 Swanston St, Melbourne	demolished; now City Square	
Deutscher Verein Club Rooms		1885	7 Alfred Place, Melbourne	German Association club rooms	
The Spread Eagle Hotel		1885	Corner of Bridge Rd & Coppin St, Richmond		
Residence and Surgery		1885	384 Church St, Richmond	For Dr. Druidin	
Record Chambers		1887	479-481 Collins St, Melbourne	now part of Olderfleet Buildings redevelopment	
Richmond UFS Free Dispensary		1887	292 Church St, Richmond		
Oxford		1888	23 Isabella Grove, Hawthorn	Built as Friesia, for the German Consul; added to the Victorian Heritage Register	
Borussia		1888	6 Shakespeare Grove, Hawthorn	Built for the German Consulate	
Howse		1888	45 Chrystobel Cres, Hawthorn		
Narellan		1889	3 Moule St, Brighton		
Howlands		1889	37 Docker St, Richmond	Also known as Alexander's House	
Ulimaroa		1889	630 St Kilda Rd, South Melbourne	Now the home of the Australian and New Zealand College of Anaesthetists	
Labassa		1889-1890	Manor Gove, Caulfield North	Built as Ontario, for A. W. Robertson; added to the Victorian Heritage Register	
Helenville		1889	377 Church St, Richmond	Residence for J. A. B. Koch	
Ancient Order of Foresters (lodge?)			Swan St, Richmond	demolished?	
Parsonage, Lutheran Church		1890	22a Parliament Place, East Melbourne		
Tandarra		1891	68 (now 58) Vale St, East Melbourne	Built as Minerva for J. C. Stanford	
Trinity Lutheran Church and Manse		1892	51-53 Victoria St, Doncaster		
Richmond Fire Station		1893	131 Lord St, Richmond		
Tantallon		1894	79 Oxley Rd, Hawthorn	Formerly 77 Oxley Rd; villa built for Mrs Annie Cameron	
Bowen Memorial Operating Theatre		1896	Melbourne Hospital		
House		c. 1896	48 Power St, Hawthorn	Koch family residence, 1896-1899	
Maffra Beet Sugar Co. Factory		1897	Maffra	demolished 1960	
Warehouse		1898	Flinders Lane, Melbourne	For Messrs L. Stevenson & Son Ltd; unbuilt, competition winner	
Mount Gambier		1898	32 Barkers Rd (Cnr. Findon Ave) Hawthorn	Villa residence for Rudolf Boehnke, a brewer	
Fallon’s Prince Alfred Hotel		1899	619 Church St, Richmond		
Nurses Quarters		1900	Women's Hospital, Melbourne		
German Arch		1901	Collins St, Melbourne	Built to celebrate the opening of the Parliament in Melbourne for the Commonwealth of Australia; decorated by Peter Hansen	
Rosscommon		1901	55 Kinkora Rd, Hawthorn	Villa residence for F. W. Fallon, a publican	
Urbrae		c. 1901	171 Hoddle St, Richmond		
House		undated	5-9 Yarra St, Hawthorn	attrib.	
St. James		undated	23 Isabella Grove, Hawthorn	Koch family residence	
House		undated	361 Highett St, Richmond	attrib.	
