= Labassa =

Historic building in Melbourne, Australia

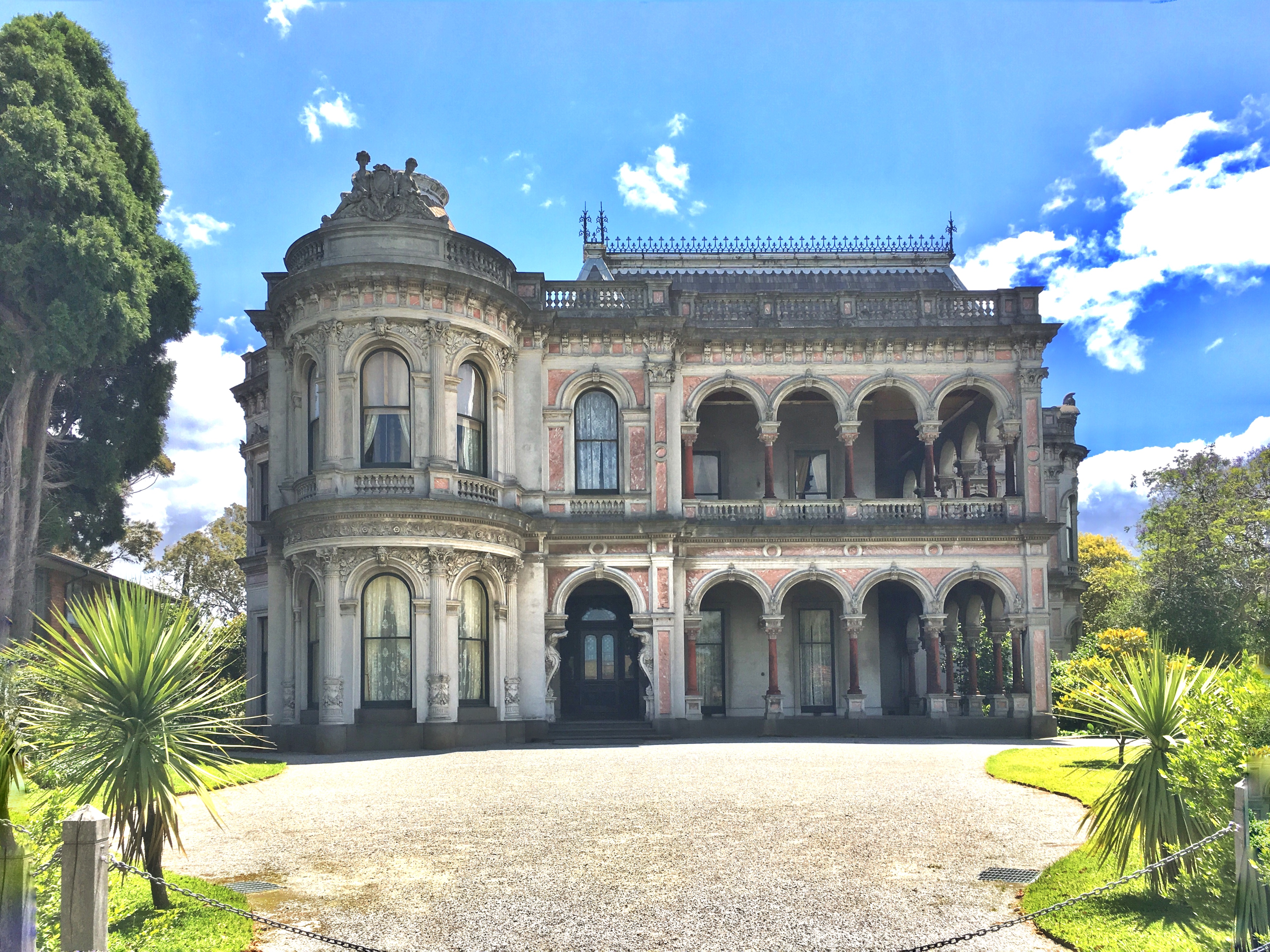
- Front entrance to the mansion, 2018

- Location of the house in Greater Metropolitan Melbourne
- Former names: Sylliott Hill (1863–1890); Ontario (1890–1904)
- Etymology: Labasa, Fiji

General information
- Status: Completed
- Type: Mansion
- Architectural style: Renaissance Revival; French Second Empire; Gründerzeit
- Location: 2 Manor Drive, Caulfield North, City of Glen Eira, Melbourne, Victoria, Australia
- Coordinates: 37°52′11″S 145°00′35″E
- Year built: 1862–1890
- Completed: 1890; 136 years ago
- Client: Richard A. Billing (1863); Alexander William Robertson (1890)

Technical details
- Grounds: 6.31 ha (15.6 acres) (1886)

Design and construction
- Architects: Crouch and Wilson (1873); JAB Koch (1890)
- Other designers: Peter Hansen (interior, 1890)
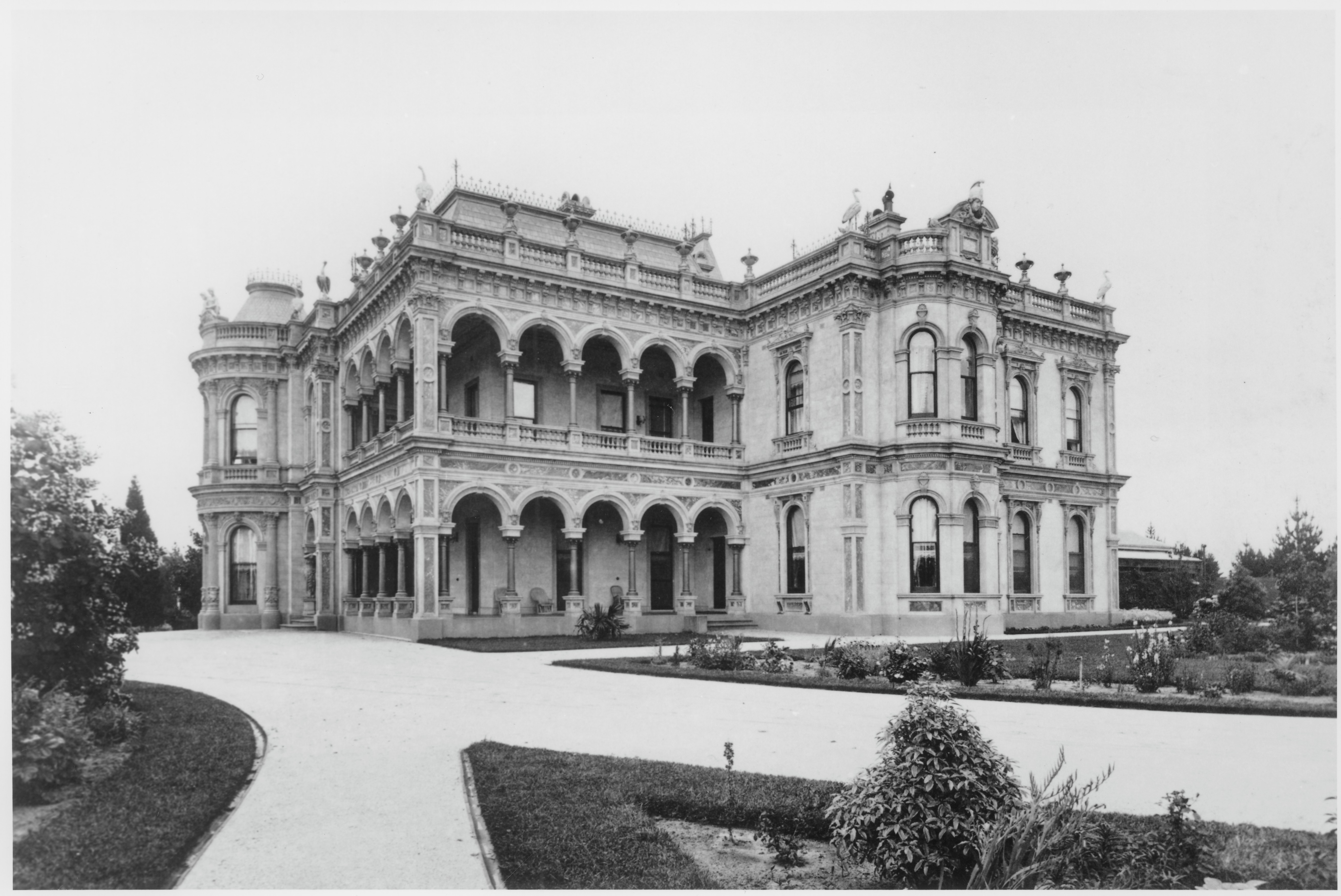
- Labassa, c. 1890 – c. 1893

Site notes
- Owner: National Trust of Australia (Victoria) (since 1980)
- Public access: Third Sunday of the month (excl. December); 10:30am-4:00pm
- Website: nationaltrust.org.au

Victorian Heritage Register
- Official name: Labassa
- Type: Registered place
- Designated: 9 October 1974
- Reference no.: VHR H0135
- Heritage overlay no.: HO42
- Category: Residential buildings (private)

Victorian Heritage Register
- Official name: Labassa Conservatory (former)
- Type: Registered place
- Designated: 14 November 2002
- Reference no.: VHR H2005
- Heritage overlay no.: HO44
- Categories: Parks, Gardens and Trees; Residential buildings (private)

Register of the National Estate
- Official name: Labassa
- Type: Defunct register
- Designated: 21 March 1978
- Reference no.: 5740

Labassa is a late-19th century former mansion, now an historic house museum, located at 2 Manor Drive in Caulfield North, in the City of Glen Eira, in the inner eastern suburbs of Melbourne, in Victoria, Australia. It is particularly noted for the lavish decoration of the main rooms, a rare survival. The former mansion, then known as Sylliott Hill, was built on the traditional lands of the Bunurong people from 1862; expanded in 1873 as Ontario to plans by Crouch and Wilson; and then significantly expanded to its present form in 1890 by JAB Koch for the family of Alexander Robertson, a prominent businessman. When it was converted into flats in 1920, an appreciation for the interiors of the main rooms meant they were retained, surviving though nine owners and countless tenants. By 1960 all the grounds were subdivided or built on, leaving the house on a small site on a side street.

The former mansion was amongst the first places added to the Victorian Heritage Register when it was established in 1974 in recognition of its architectural, aesthetic, and historical significance. The mansion's former conservatory, located at an adjacent site and built in 1890, was also added to the same register, in 2002, in recognition of its historical and architectural significance. The former mansion, former conservatory, former tennis pavilion, former stables, and the former entrance gates to the estate – relocated to Bacchus Marsh in 1922 – were all also added to a non-statutory list by the Victorian branch of the National Trust between 1974 and 1989. The National Trust acquired the property in 1980, and subsequently restored the former mansion and adjacent buildings as an historic house museum, open to the public. The former mansion was also added to the non-statutory and now defunct Register of the National Estate on 21 March 1978.

== History ==
=== The first house ===
Two large lots at the corner of Balaclava and Orrong Roads, North Caulfield, were first acquired in 1854 by William Lyall; and were transferred in 1859 to his partner, John Mickle, who also acquired the adjoining allotment on Balaclava Road. The three allotments were purchased by lawyer, Richard A. Billing, and he built an eight-roomed house named Sylliott Hill in 1862–3. The house was extended significantly in 1873 into a twenty-room house, designed by architects Crouch and Wilson. The new works added a tower and the grand staircase lit by a stained glass window. The expansion reflected Billing's ongoing success as a barrister, and he lived here until his death in 1882.

=== Robertson’s mansion ===
In 1883 prominent Melbourne businessman, Alexander William Robertson leased the property from Billing's widow. Robertson, recently widowed and with six children, was an energetic immigrant from Canada. He had found success in the 1870s as a partner with another Canadian running the Victorian arm of Cobb & Co, the biggest coaching firm in Australia. He was an accomplished horseman and enthusiastic member of the Melbourne Hunt Club, chasing deer across the estates and paddocks of the suburban fringe. His fortune multiplied greatly in 1886 through his share of the successful Mount Morgan gold mine in Queensland. In 1885 he purchased the adjoining allotment in Balaclava Road, and then in 1886 purchased Sylliott Hill itself, creating a 6.31-hectare (16-acre) estate. He renamed the property Ontario, after his home province in Canada. The 1880s were years of economic boom in Victoria, and many large houses and mansion estates sprang up around the city, with a concentration in the areas around North Caulfield such as East St Kilda, Armadale, Malvern and Toorak.

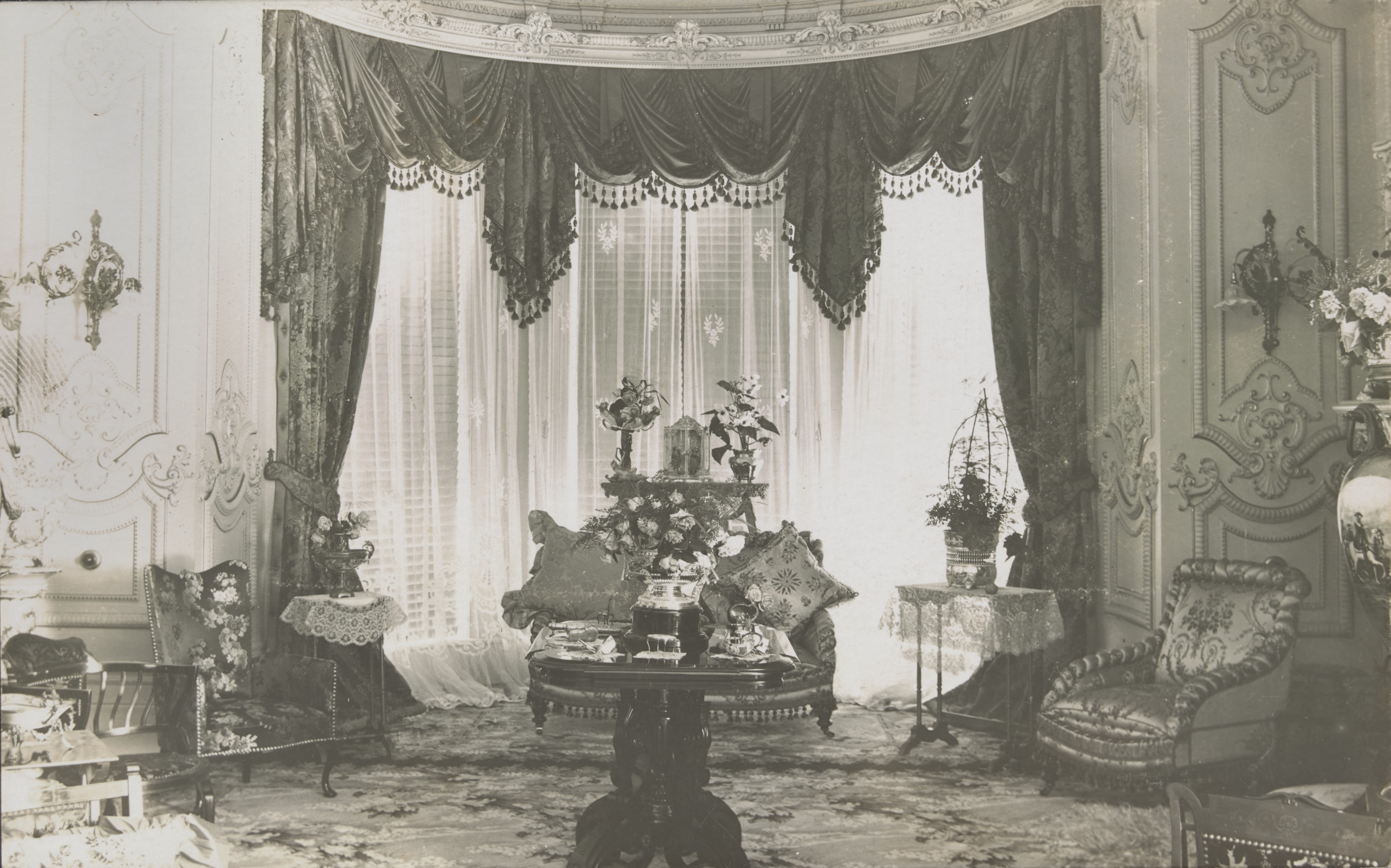
Drawing room during Watson ownership

In c. 1889, Robertson commissioned the German-born and locally-trained architect, John A. B. Koch, to extensively remodel the house into a thirty-five roomed mansion. The already large house was extended and altered, resulting in the mansion as it now appears. This involved expanding some existing main rooms with projecting bays, removing internal walls, and adding rooms on the east side, creating four large reception rooms - drawing room, dining room, billiard and music room. Arcaded verandahs were created on two sides, connecting the projecting bays. The interiors were decorated by Danish born Peter Hansen, who was known for his painted ceilings.

The gardens were expanded, with 100 trees, extensive flower beds, a tennis court and pavilion, and a freestanding cast-iron conservatory, also believed to have been designed by Koch. Elaborate cast iron entry gates for the corner of Balaclava and Orrong Roads were purchased from the Saracen Foundry in Glasgow.

While the works were underway, the family was in London, where Robertson's two daughters entered British society, and the family returned at the end of 1890. A lavish party at the new house made the newspapers in August 1892, when the Victorian economic crash after the boom years of the 1880s was well under way. Robertson did not live to enjoy the house for long, dying in 1896. The house was then tenanted until it was eventually sold in 1904 to John Boyd Watson II, son of a Bendigo mining millionaire. He renamed the property Labassa, probably after the town of Labasa in Fiji, which he and wife Flora had visited on a cruise.

In 1910, the family put the estate up for sale, possibly because of John's declining health, since he died the next year. After failing to sell, in 1913 about two-thirds of the estate to the east and south of the mansion was subdivided, with Flora and her teenage children remaining in the house with a reduced garden. The subdivision created forty-six house lots, and included the formation of the southern parts of Labassa Grove and Ontario Street.

The cast iron gates on the corner of Balaclava and Orrong Roads were purchased by architect Edmond George Ovey, who also purchased one of the lots facing Balaclava Road (now No 72). The gates remained in situ until 1921, when they were bought by the Bacchus Marsh branch of the Australian Natives' Association (ANA) to serve as an entrance to Maddingley Park in Bacchus Marsh, and as a World War I war memorial.

=== Labassa flats ===
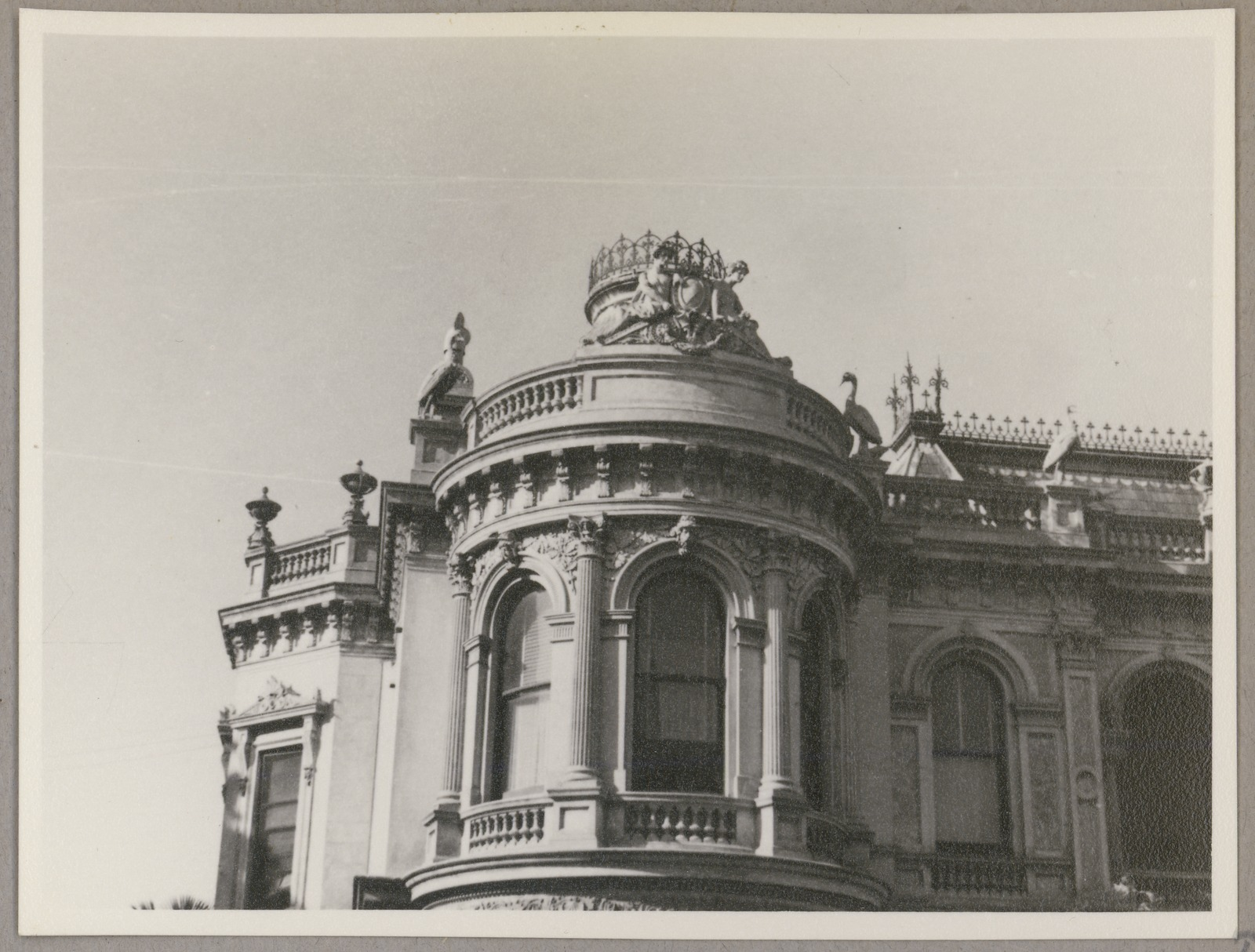
Bay window, 1949

In 1919, with her children grown, Flora Watson decided to sell up. The house was retained on a much smaller lot, and the rest subdivided into 10 lots, creating Manor Grove. Some outbuildings were retained, such as the stables, now at no 5-9 Manor Grove, which were then altered to become a house. The conservatory, on a very small lot, was purchased by Ovey, and added to the rear of his block. The tennis pavilion ended up in the rear of 13 Manor Grove, and was repurposed as a shed. The house was bought by 'flipper' Stanley Stuart Sergeant who could see potential in turning the house into superior flats. The grandest ones were those created from the main reception rooms, where the decoration was carefully retained; partitions in some rooms to create two smaller ones stopped short of the elaborate ceilings. Sergeant lived there himself with his family for a short time, and other tenants included well off professional people, some recently single women, and some families with children. He installed James and Emily Brearley as caretakers, who stewarded the care of the interiors. Emily stayed on after James died in 1943 right up to 1964, becoming the longest resident by far. Sergeant's ownership was short, selling on to former grazier Robert Hannon in 1922, who also moved in with his wife, and his son's family. Residents continued to remain fairly well to do, and one family, Percy Kingston, his wife Ivy and her sister Helen occupied the billiard room / music room flat, where they lived for 30 years. Hannon bought the old stables back and converted it into three apartments in 1926, called Ontario Flats, and he and his wife moved into one. It was here that he committed suicide in 1929, leaving the house in the hands of trustees for many years. Labassa was finally sold in 1933 to William and Sarah (Sal) O'Callaghan, who had run a series of country hotels, with Ontario Flats sold separately. In 1936, William built a red brick block of four flats adjacent to the house to the rear, parallel to the rear wing, naming it Willas (Wil plus Sal backwards). The mansion flats and Willas were operated as one, with a communal laundry and telephone. With more residents and more children, it felt like an extended family to some. The community extended to the adjacent Ontario flats, where the future politician and activist Barry Jones arrived as a child with his family in 1938. Occupants of the mansion included a set of relatives, the Spencers and the Dalys, who contributed eight people in four flats from the late 30s to the early 50s. The Chadwicks, Tom and Annie, who rented flat 10 (the former drawing room and boudoir) from 1934-1948, hosted charity events, sometimes in the remaining front garden. Louise Lovely, who had been a Hollywood actress in the early 1920s, lived in one of the Willas flats from 1936 to about 1941 with her husband Bert Cowen.

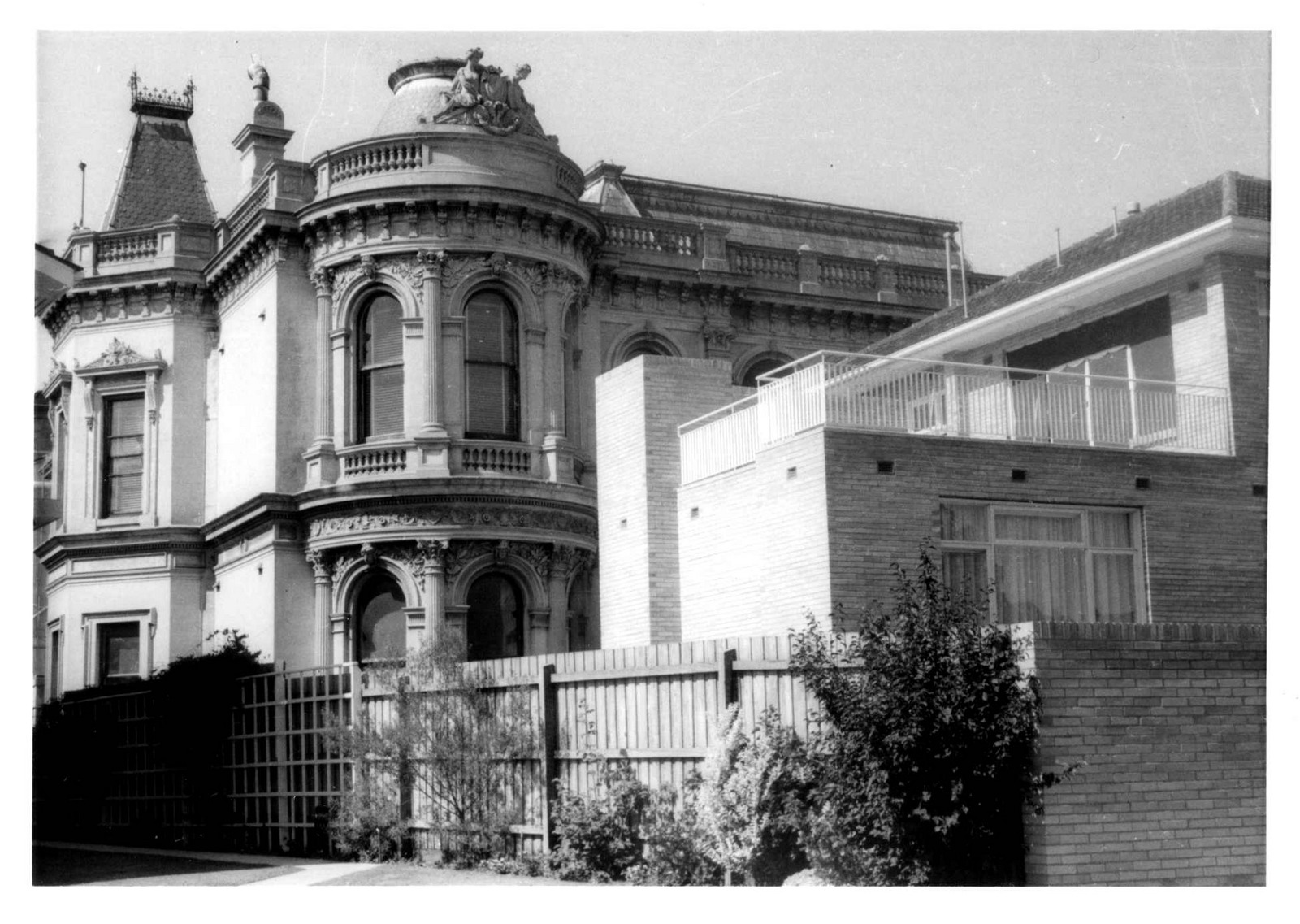
Labassa, with Kazer house in front, 1970s

In 1946 Labassa was sold to Teodor and Sima Lapin, the first of many Jewish owners, a time when the North Caulfield area began to become the centre of Jewish community in Melbourne. They sold it the next year to a family of Jewish investors, who then sold it in 1949 to Wolf and Hinda Kazer, who had fled Poland just before WWII. By the early 1950s most residents on the top floor were post-war Jewish refugees, and though from different countries they mostly spoke Yiddish, and supported each other in their new home. Caretaker Emily Brearley continued to look after the house, as well as the specific needs of the new residents, for instance by turning on the heating in their flats for them on the Sabbath in winter. In 1957 the Kazers subdivided a part of the garden, and a block of flats (1B Manor Grove) replaced the fountain and rockery. In 1960, they built a cream brick home for themselves over what remained of the garden. By the early 1960s, young migrant families from northern Europe and Scandinavia were added to the mix, creating a 'little United Nations' of young and old, married and single. In 1962 Wolf died, and Hinda sold the new house, but retained the mansion. Though now hemmed in, it remained untouched, indeed neglected, to the point that sections of the ceiling collapsed. The brolgas on the parapet had already been removed as dangerous in 1958. Tenants also began souveniring items such as bell-pulls and even a chandelier on the assumption that the days of the house were numbered.

After Mrs Brearley died in 1964, management became more remote, and the flats started to attract 'bohemian' and artistic residents. By the early 1970s, tenants included art school students and musicians who were attracted to the cheap rents and faded glamour of the house. Labassa became a place of parties, music, performances, and overnight visitors, and a source of irritation to other residents of Manor Grove. Fascinated by this relic of another era, some tenants filled their flats with Victorian furniture and bric-a-brac found cheap at second hand stores. Residents at this time who went on to successful careers included performer Jane Clifton, song writer Hans Poulsen, playwright John Romeril, and poet Geoffrey Eggleston. Many films both amateur and professional were shot using the interiors, including Patrick, a successful 1978 horror film.

=== National Trust ownership ===
At the same time, Labassa became known to the conservation movement, and it was amongst the initial 370 places listed the Victorian Heritage Register in 1974. By the late 1970s, the Victorian branch of the National Trust was exploring ways to rescue the mansion from further decay. When Hinda Kazer died in 1980, the house was auctioned and following a large donation from Alcoa, the Trust purchased the mansion for $282,500. While urgent repairs were undertaken, many tenants stayed on since the Trust needed the rental income. Poet Javant Biarujia and his partner Ian, who moved into the house just after the auction, were the last tenants to leave in 2005.

Restoration work also started, and the approach was to only clean or reveal what had survived of the 1890 decoration, rather than repaint or restore to as-new condition. When investigating leaks above the stairs in 1986, a false ceiling was discovered hiding the original trompe-l'oeil ceiling above, depicting a balustraded view to the sky. As soon as the house had a secure future, former residents began to return items, and over the next decades the Trust tracked down and purchased others, such as one of the statue-lamps from the stairwell niche which had been taken by the Watsons in 1919.

In 1984 the Trust purchased the Kazer's house, and in 1986 it was demolished by Whelan the Wrecker to great fanfare, revealing something of the full grandeur of the mansion once again. In 2014 the former tennis pavilion at 13 Manor Grove was donated to the Trust, which was restored and placed in the rear garden. The former conservatory, which had been over-clad and used as a small house at 21 Manor Grove, was carefully restored in 2010 to serve as a living space with a new separate bedroom wing.

The National Trust began publishing a series of newsletters Labassa Lives from 2013 with detailed oral histories and research; and in 2020, the Trust published Labassa: House of Dreams.

Various proposals for a new use, for instance as a costume or decorative arts museum, proved difficult to achieve or inappropriate. Instead, the house remains as a carefully preserved example of an extravagant 19th-century Victorian interior, open to visitors and events on a limited basis.

== Description ==
=== Exterior ===
The main frontages of the house adopt the typical form seen on many large Victorian houses in Melbourne, with projecting bays on two sides, joined by an L-shaped double height verandah. At Labassa, the level of rich cement render detailing over this basic form is rarely seen in any other extant house of the period. The elements are drawn from the Renaissance Revival as practiced in Melbourne, as well as the French Second Empire, and 19th-century Germany has been suggested as another source.

The south west bay is semi-circular and articulated by engaged Corinthian columns with swags to their bases, Ionic columns above, foliated decoration above the windows, and statuary above the cornice, all topped by a truncated conical roof. The verandah features insets of pink marble, Corinthian colonettes in cast iron, and a pair of caryatid figures flanking the entrance. The east projection (containing the billiard and music rooms) employs plain walls with very elaborate window hoods, and a round-cornered bay window topped by a broken pediment with a classical bust. There is a very elaborate bracketed cornice running around all main sides, topped by a balustrade, originally supporting large urns and statues of brolgas on the corners, and a short mansard roof with cast iron cresting provides a backdrop.The west front includes a faceted bay window and has detailing matching the east projection. Further north the walls are plain, with the tower above, topped by a tall mansard roof. The service wing beyond is undecorated.

=== Interior ===
Labassa is particularly noted for its very elaborate interiors, which largely survive from the 1890 renovations, and the 1981 book Victorian Splendour notes that "Labassa is a rarity amongst Victorian houses. It possess a wealth of architectural excitement coupled with workmanship and materials of the richest calibre.", and includes it as one of only six houses in Australia as worthy of individual discussion for their intact interiors.

The hall features a high Lincrusta dado of raised panels filled with arabesques, and wallpaper above manufactured in Japan with gilt floral decoration featuring grapes and chrysanthemums on a beige background, while the ceiling is filled with painted decoration of arabesques. The stairs feature elaborate lamps on the newels, and divide at the landing in front of the large 1873 stained glass window depicting the four seasons, by the leading firm of Ferguson & Urie. There are niches either side for statuette-lamps, and a trompe-l'oeil ceiling above depicting a balustraded view to the sky. The drawing room is decorated in a contrasting light coloured Louis XVI style, with panelled walls, elaborate mouldings, and a Rococo overmantel, all originally with gold leaf highlights. The ceiling is stencilled with Rococo arabesques in pale colours. The smaller boudoir adjacent has a panelled dado with embossed flowers and birds, and a floral wallpaper above probably from the Watson redecoration in c1904.

The room opposite the drawing room, probably the dining room, has a Lincrusta dado embossed with panels and floral motifs in imitation of timber panelling, and the wallpaper above has a late Renaissance pattern of scrolls and foliage in bronze on a white and beige background. The ceiling has Moorish geometric divisions, with papers embossed with zig-zag lines and chrysanthemums. There is a tall Queen Anne style mirrored overmantel, and an equally tall sideboard in similar style. The next large room, possibly a billiard room, has a polished timber dado, a wallpaper of cream patterns on a blue background (damaged by later wallpaper now removed), and a heavier Queen Anne style polished timber overmantel. The bay window is framed by an arch supported on pairs of Corinthian columns decorated with vines. There is a painted ceiling of elaborate illusionistic borders, which includes a painted marine scene, and a similar desert one. The next room beyond, possibly a music room, is a large space, with a small raised stage on one side, flanked by carved timber columns, with smaller ones flanking the doors, dark polished as is the timber dado. The wallpaper is another Renaissance inspired floral pattern, in gold on a dark pink background, and the ceiling is deeply coffered into large panels, each with delicate painted decoration.

In the upstairs rooms, only some decoration or wallpapers survive, and some partitions for the flats have been preserved. Two bathrooms partly survive, with some original tiling up to the ceilings, but later fixtures.

== Gallery ==
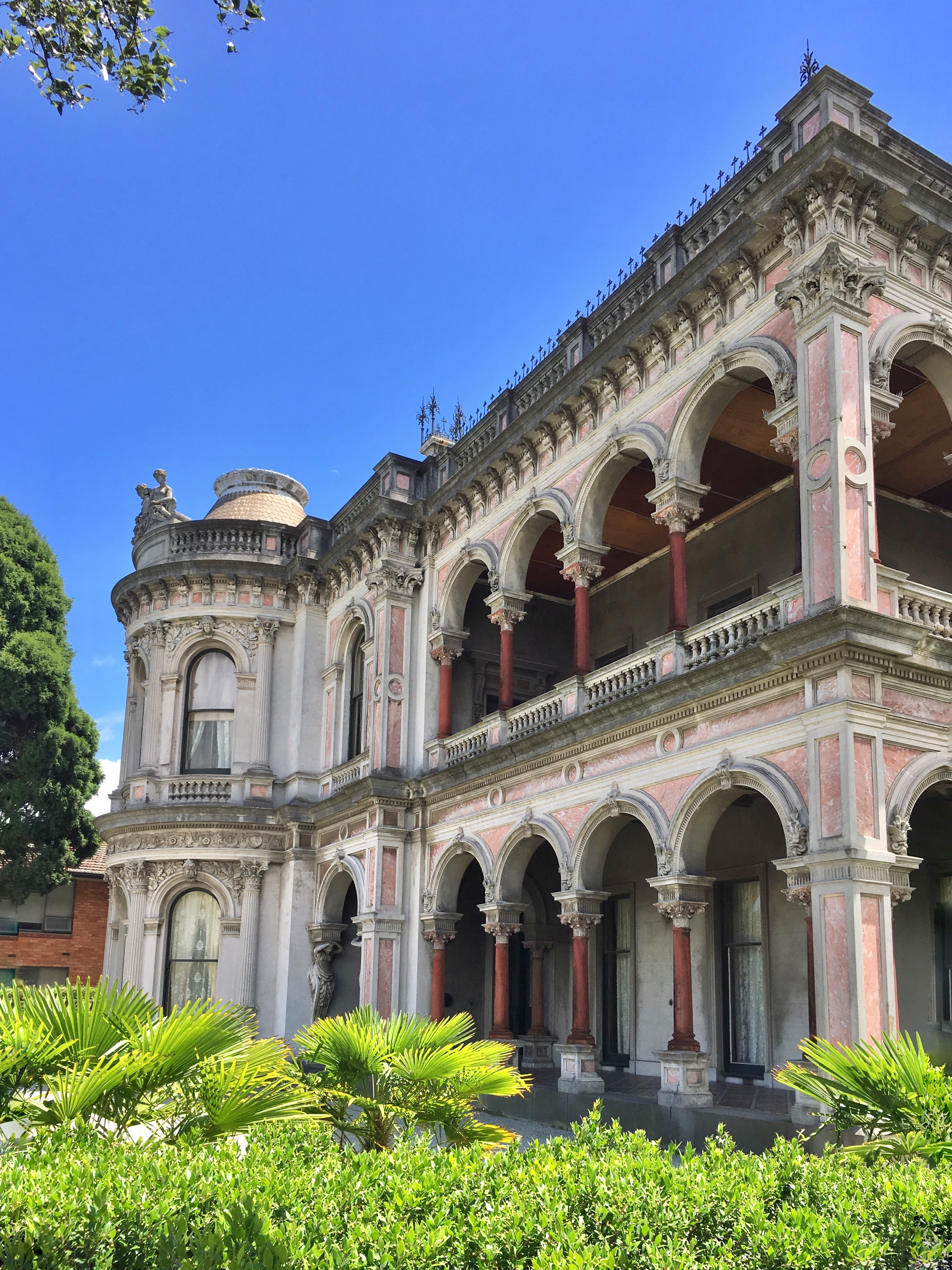
From the south east

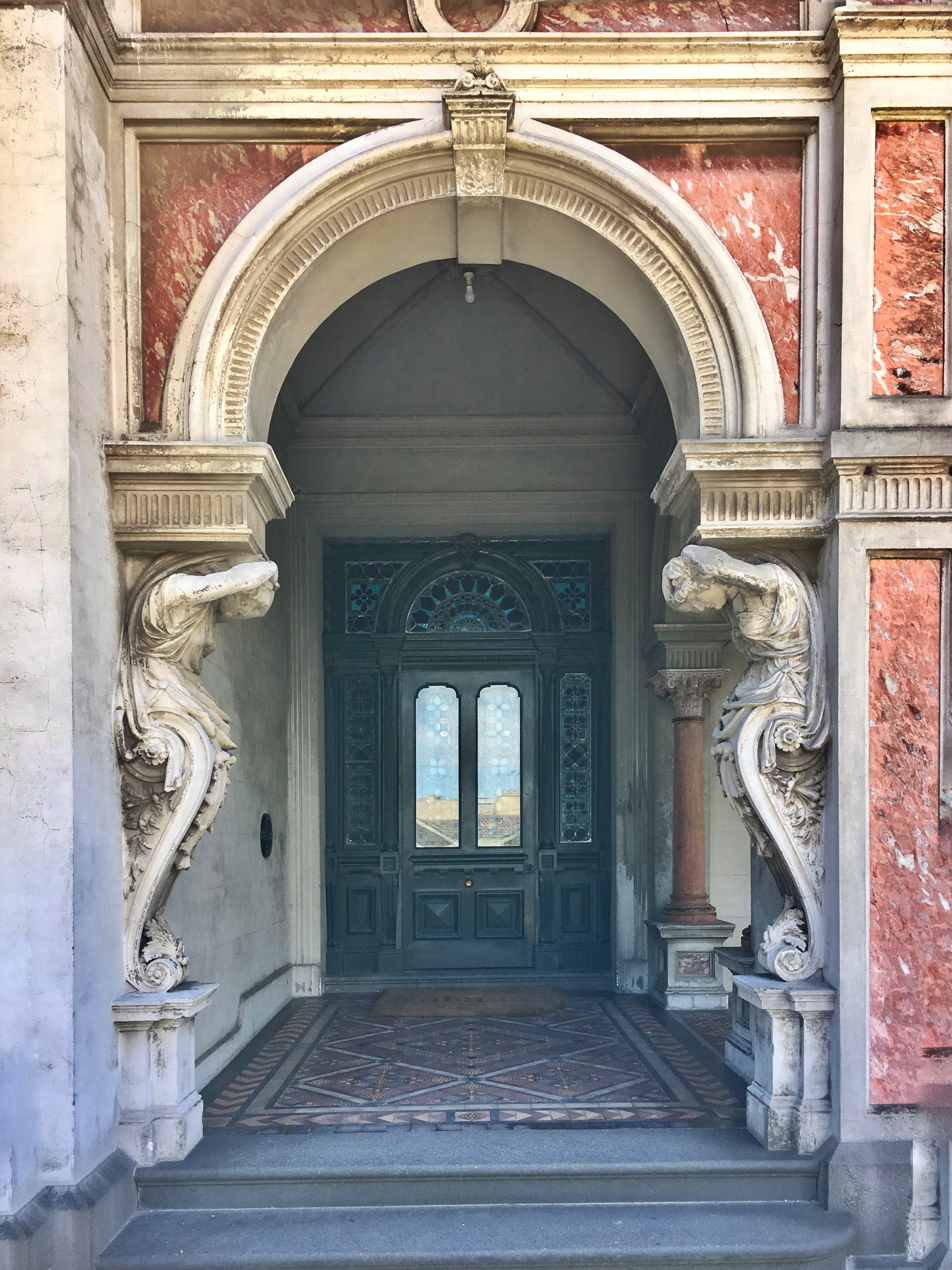
Entrance

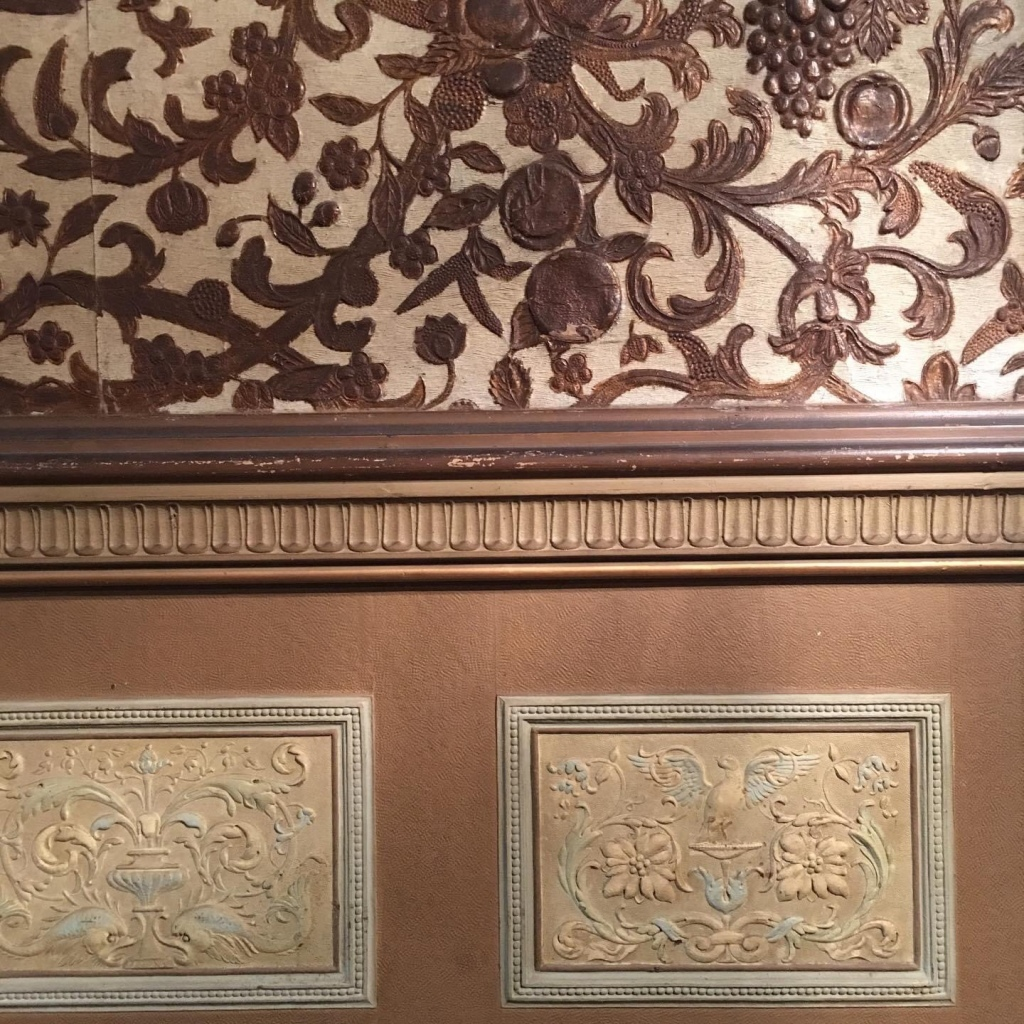
Hall wallpapers

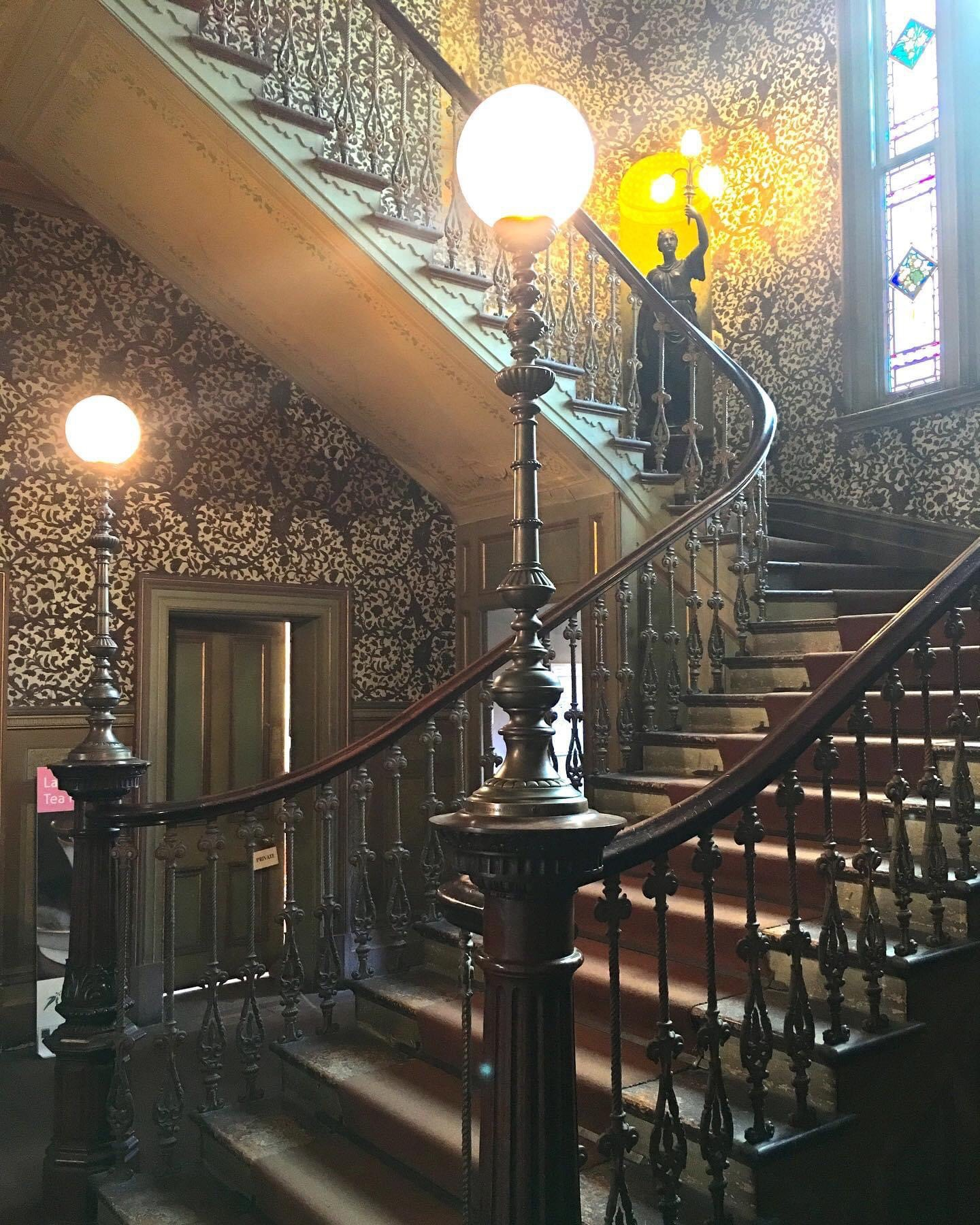
Stairs

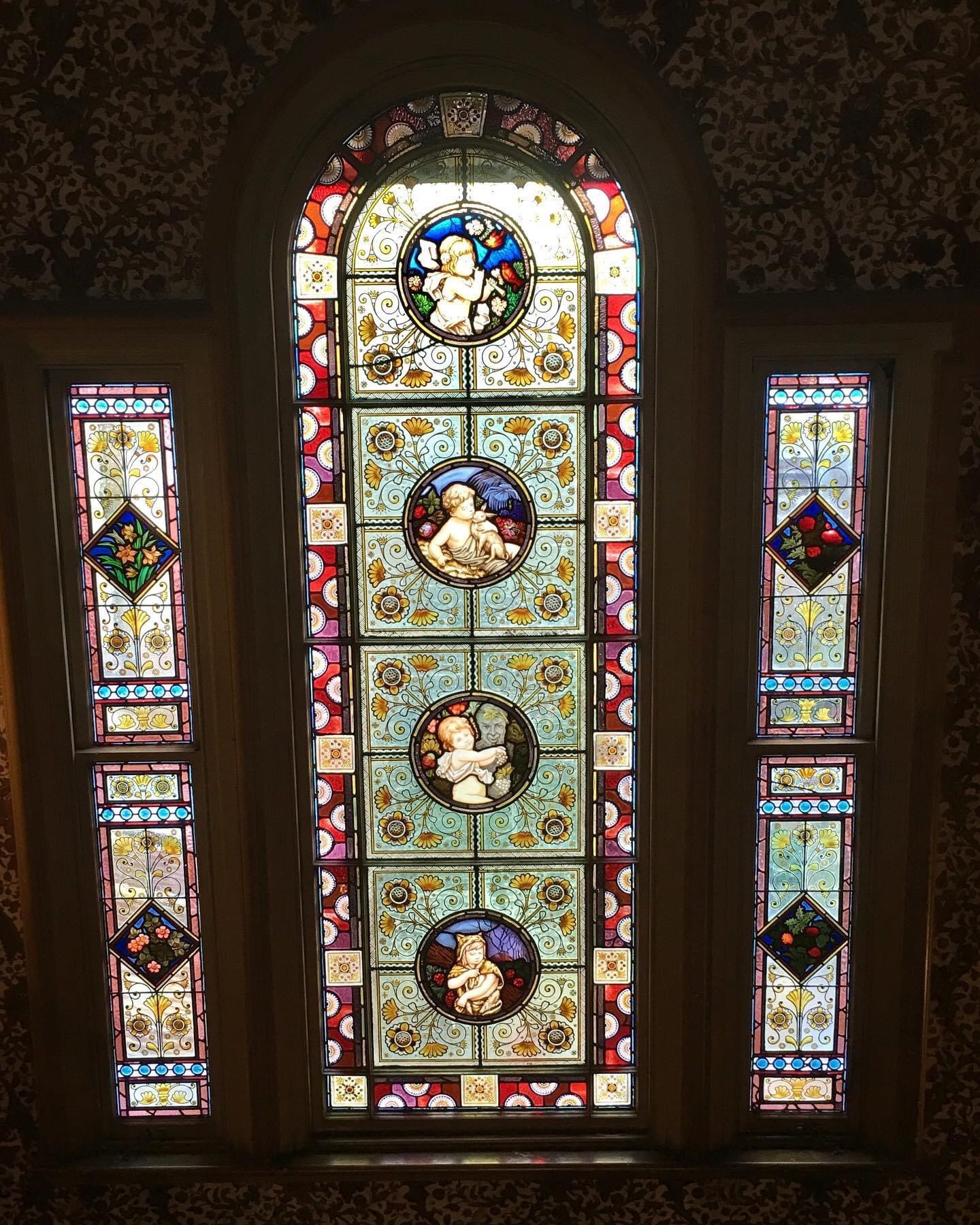
Stairhall stained glass

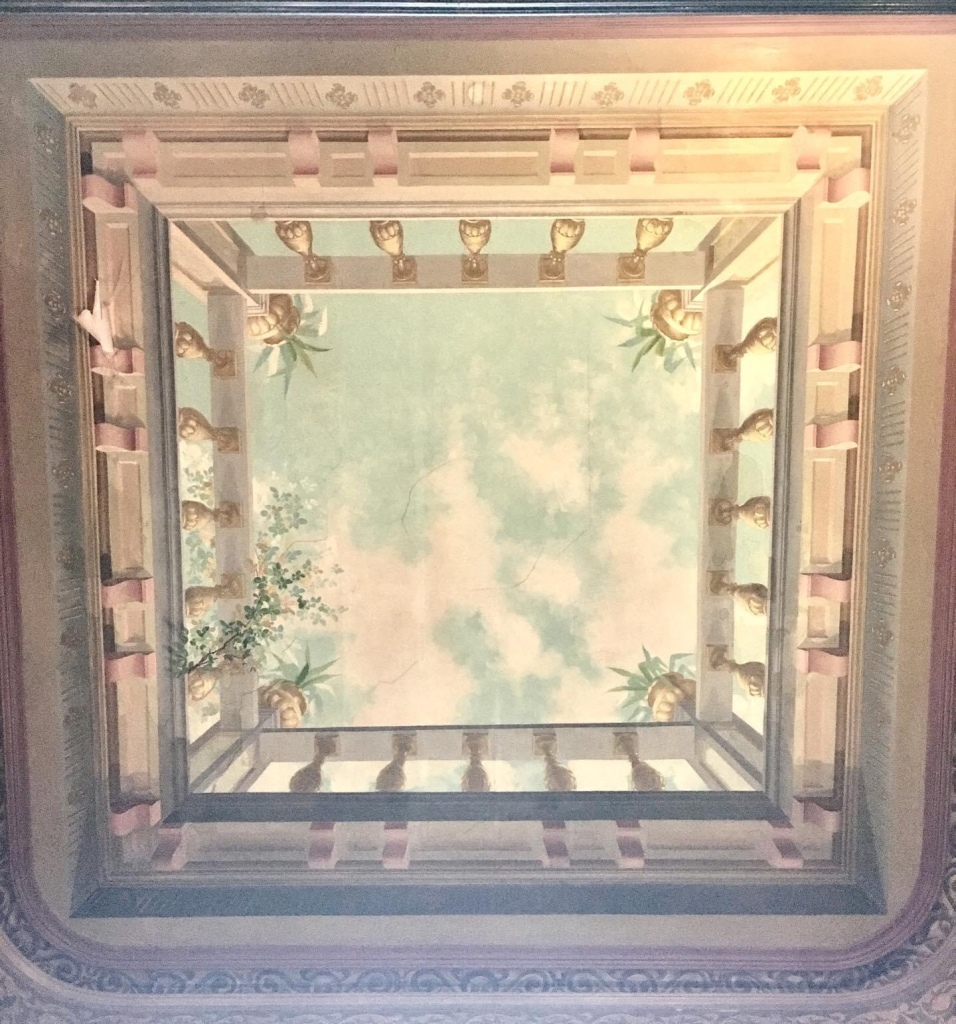
Stairhall trompe-l'oeil ceiling

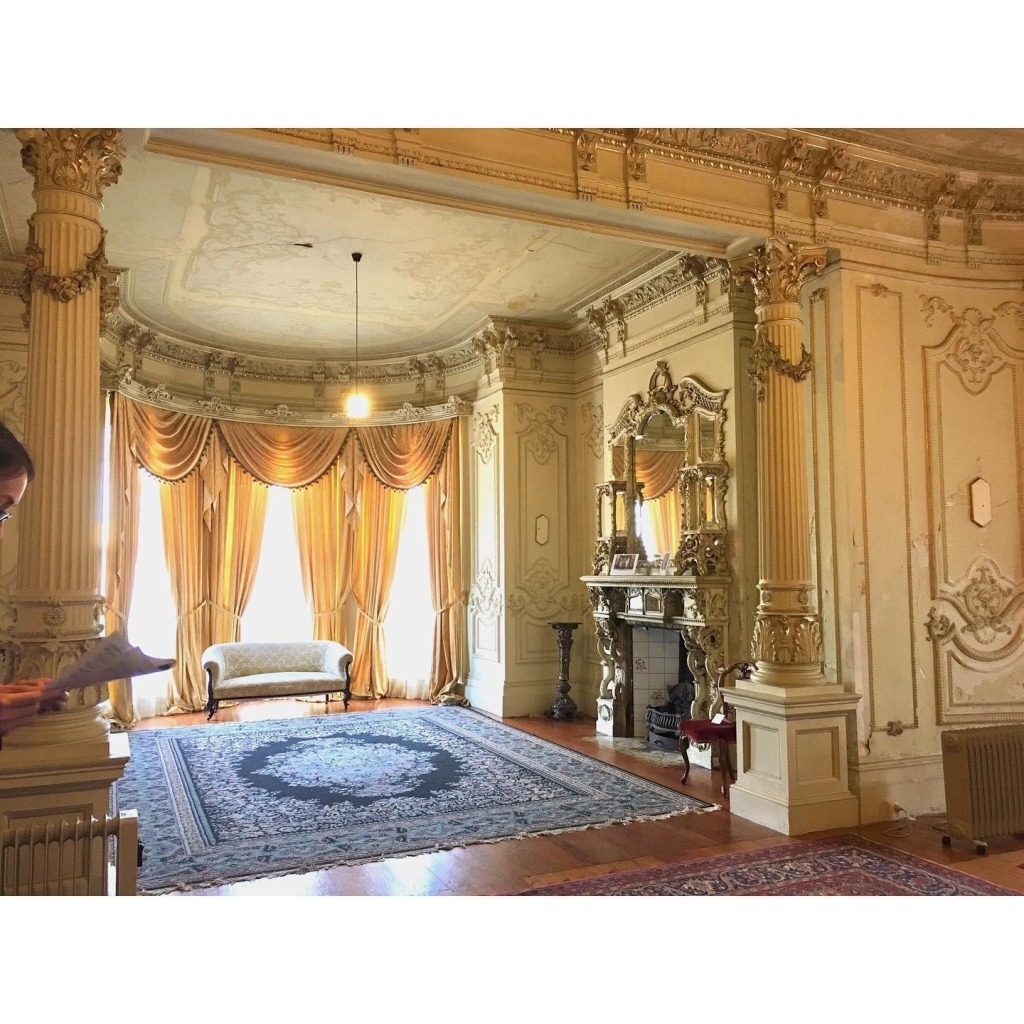
Drawing room

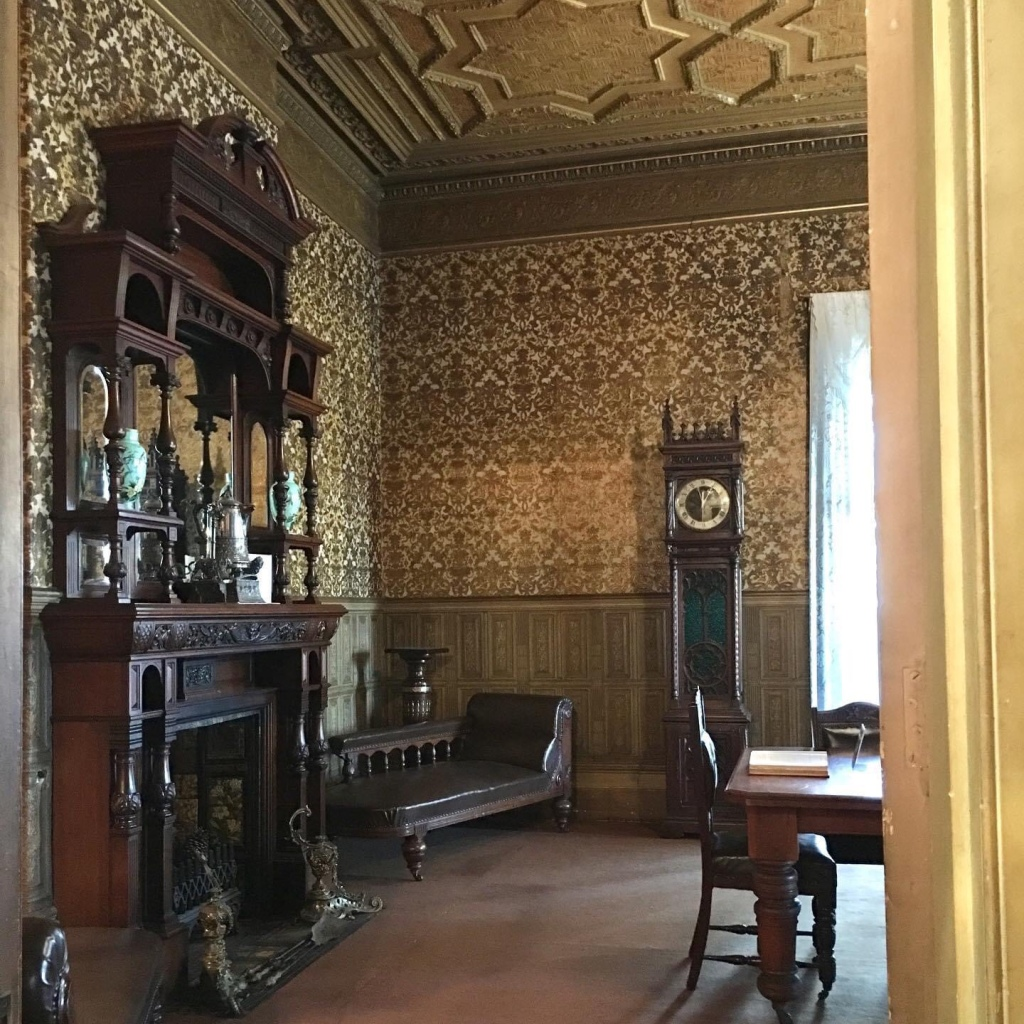
Dining room

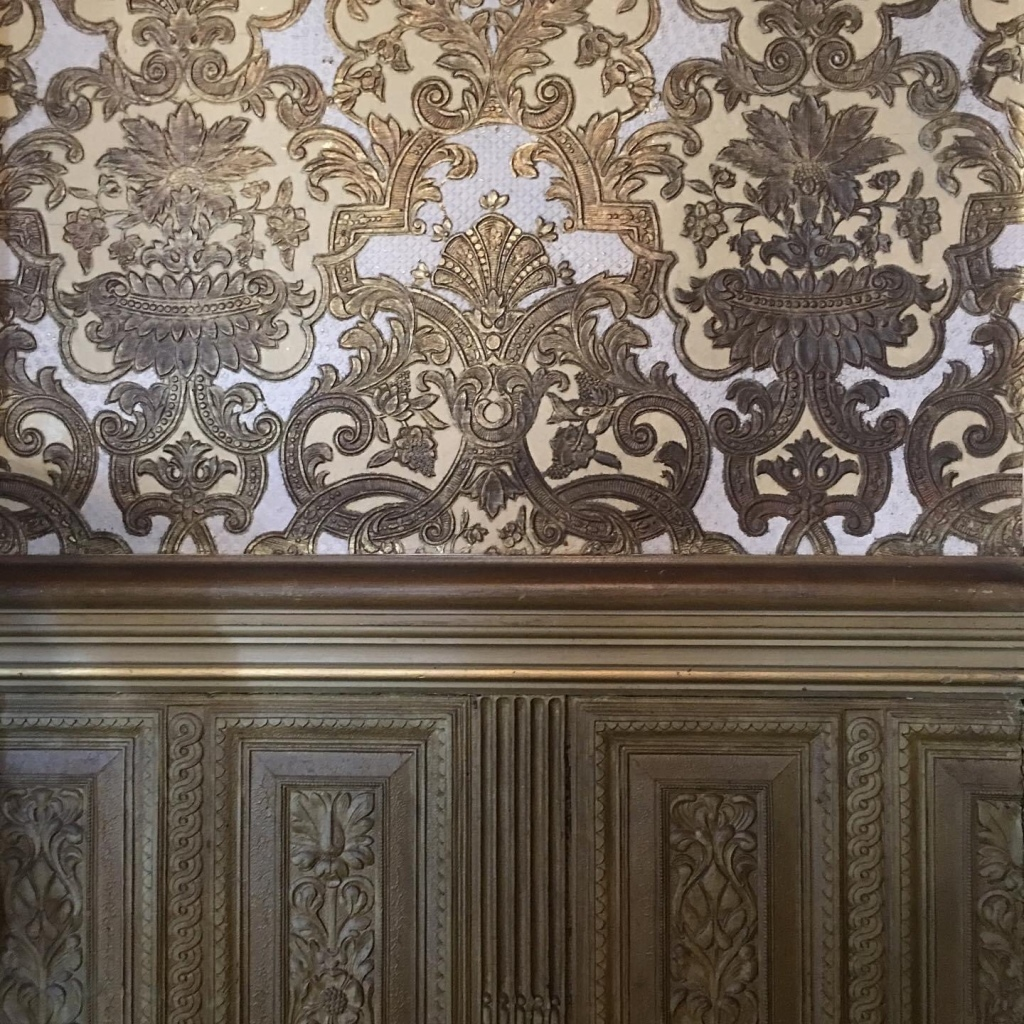
Dining Room wallpapers

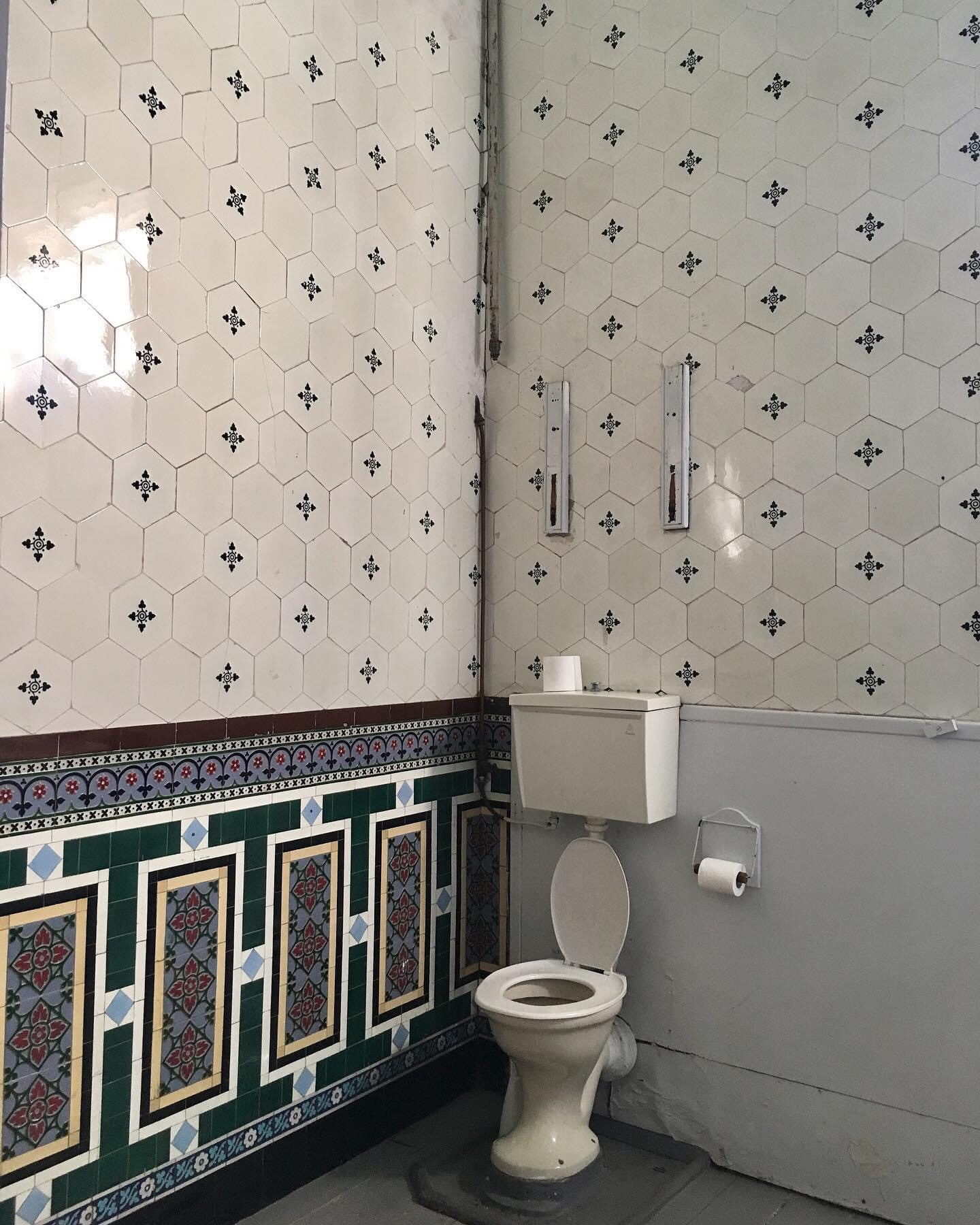
Bathroom

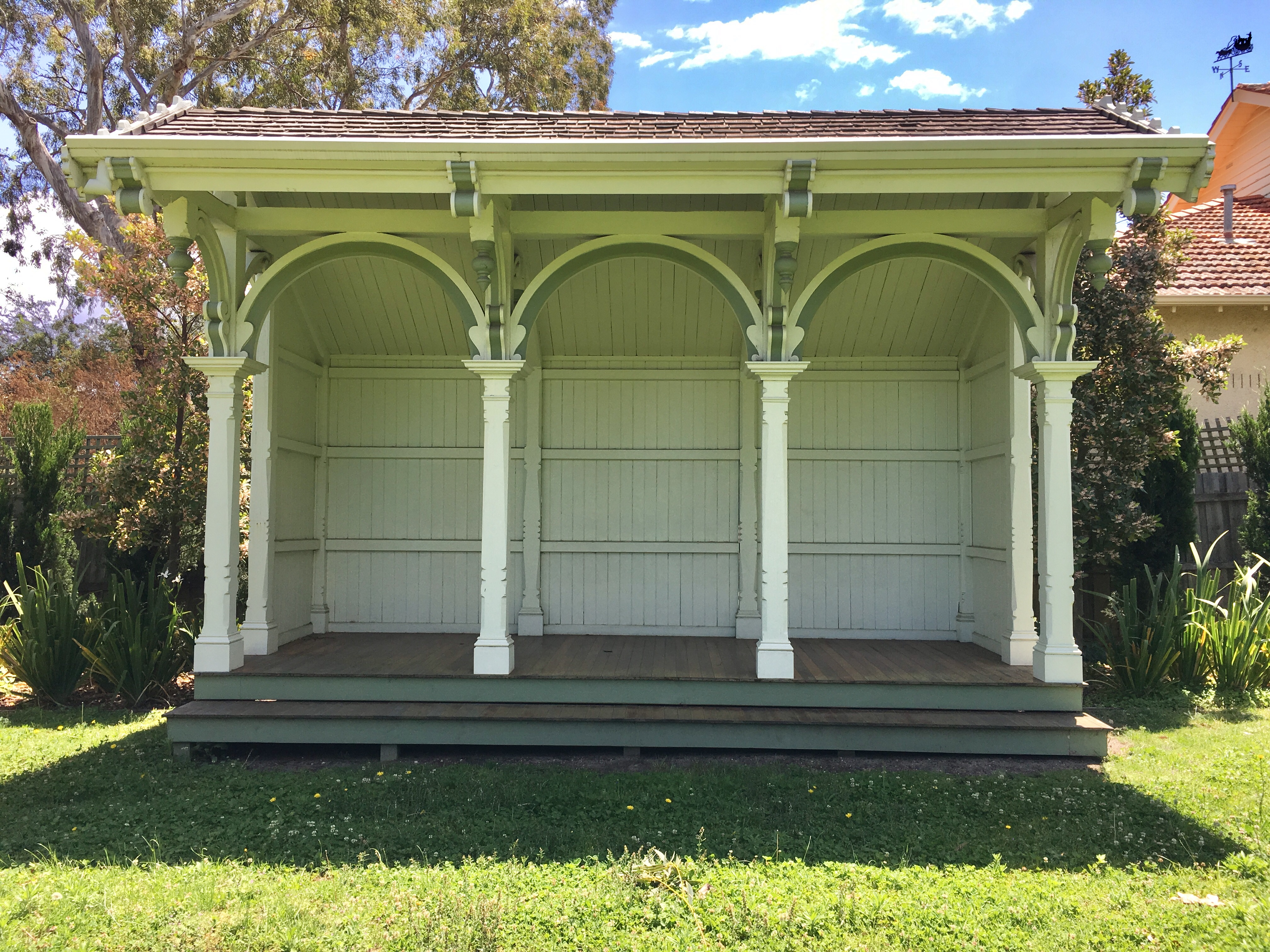
Tennis pavilion

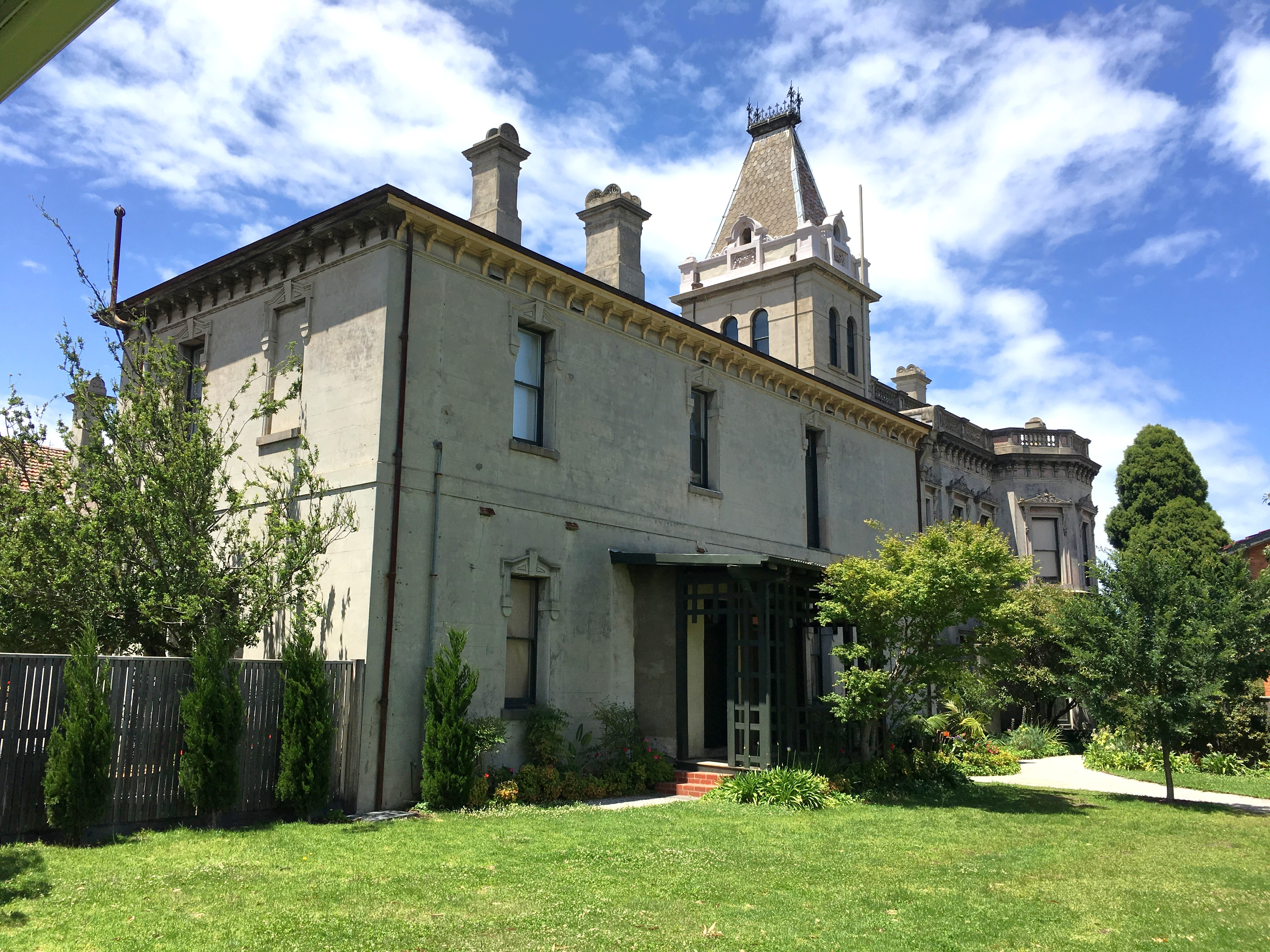
Rear wing

== See also ==
- Architecture of Melbourne
- List of places on the Victorian Heritage Register in the City of Glen Eira
