= Richmond Metropolitan Fire Station =

Former fire station in Melbourne, Victoria, Australia

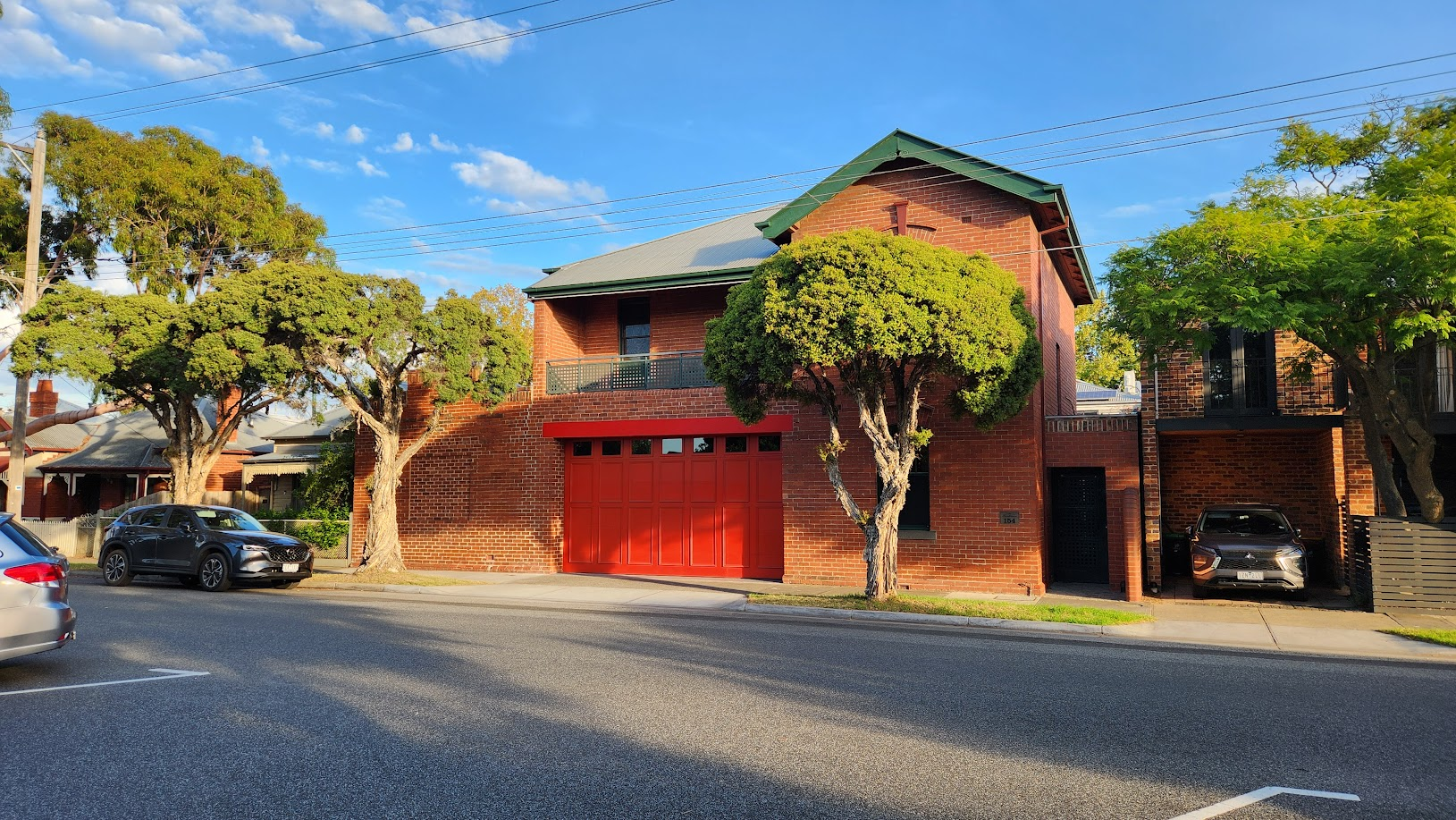
- The former fire station, in May 2026

- Location within Melbourne

General information
- Location: 154 Somerset Street, Richmond, Yarra City, Melbourne, Victoria, Australia
- Coordinates: 37°48′59″S 145°00′29″E
- Year built: 1905–1910
- Completed: 1910; 116 years ago
- Owner: Metropolitan Fire Brigade (1910– )

Technical details
- Material: Red brick
- Floor count: 2

Design and construction
- Architect: Percy Oakden

The Richmond Metropolitan Fire Station is a former fire station located at 154 Somerset Street in Richmond, an inner-city suburb of Melbourne, in Victoria, Australia. The former fire station was built between 1905 and 1910.

== Description ==
=== Historical use ===
The two-storey brick building was built as the Richmond branch of the Metropolitan Fire Brigade with a residential wing. Its designer may have been MFB architect Percy Oakden.

The building was added to the local heritage register of the City of Yarra in c. 2007.

=== Contemporary use ===
Converted to a four-bedroom 370-square-metre (4,000 sq ft) residence, the building was sold at auction for $2.75 million in October 2014.

== See also ==
- Architecture of Melbourne
