= Newton J. Tharp =

American architect, painter (1867–1909)

Newton James Tharp
- Born: July 28, 1867; Mount Pleasant, Henry County, Iowa, United States
- Died: May 12, 1909 (aged 41); New York City, New York, United States
- Education: San Francisco School of Design, École des Beaux-Arts
- Occupations: Architect, painter
- Spouse: Laura Hanna (married 1892–1909; his death)
- Children: 2

Newton James Tharp (July 28, 1867 – May 12, 1909) was an American architect and painter. He was the city architect for San Francisco. He was the namesake of the Newton J. Tharp Commercial School (1908–1952) on Grove Street in San Francisco. He was a part of the firm Tharp and Holmes.

== Early life, family and education ==
Newton James Tharp was born on July 28, 1867, in Mount Pleasant, Iowa. His family moved in 1874 to Petaluma, California, where his childhood friend was botanist Luther Burbank.

For four years he attended the San Francisco School of Design (later known as San Francisco Art Institute); followed by study at École des Beaux-Arts in Paris. He also studied in Italy.

Tharp and Laura Hanna married on 1892 in Los Angeles, together they had two children.

== Career ==
After finishing his education, he worked in Chicago, and New York City. Tharp returned to San Francisco in 1889, where he was initially working under architect Edward Robinson Swain, on the San Francisco Ferry Building. He became a partner of Tharp and Holmes with Edward L. Holmes until the summer of 1901. This was followed by work with architect Albert L. Farr prior to the 1906 San Francisco earthquake.

In October 1907, Tharp became the city architect of San Francisco, succeeding the late William Dennis Shea Sr. (1866–1931). He was responsible for the design of local firehouses, hospitals, and schools. He held the role of city architect until his death.

He also worked as a landscape and portrait painter. Tharp was a member of the Bohemian Club. In 1902, he was elected to the American Institute of Architects.

== Death ==
He died of pneumonia on May 12, 1909, at The Knickerbocker Hotel while traveling in New York City. He was survived by his wife and one son.

After his death, many of the painters associated with the city came together under the leadership of Charles J. Dickson to hold an exhibition in his honor at the California Club in San Francisco, including Maynard Dixon, Arthur F. Matthews, Xavier Martínez, Giuseppe Cadenasso, Eugen Neuhaus, Ernest Peixotto, Will Sparks, Gordon Coutts, Ferdinand Burgdorff, Francis McComas, Orrin Peck, and Theodore Wores. The sales of the artwork went to the Tharp family, to help pay for his sons education.

== List of works ==
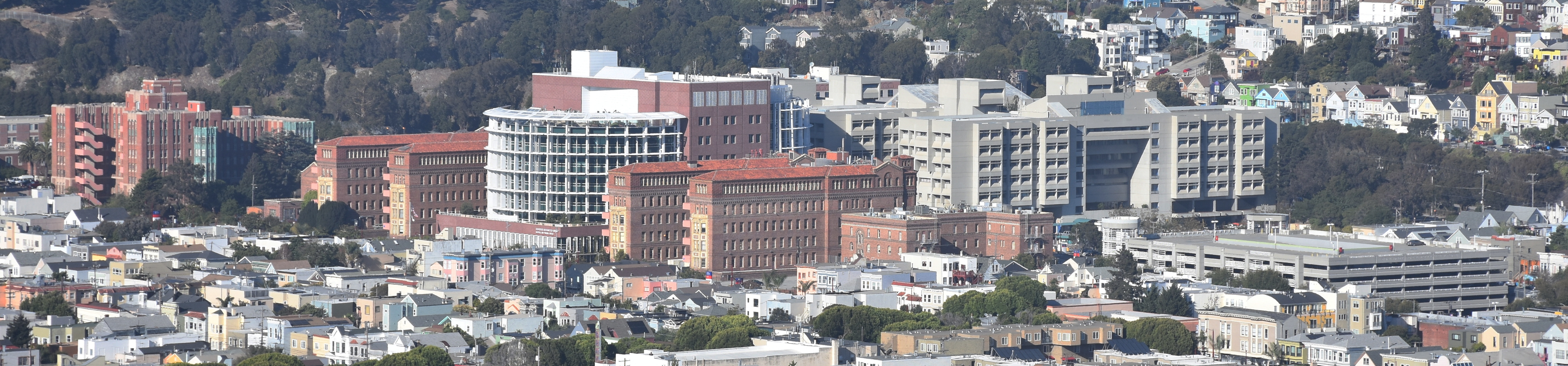
San Francisco General Hospital (built 1909, photo in 2018), six red brick buildings designed by Tharp

- 2590 Union Street (1899), San Francisco, California
- Dewey Monument (built 1901), Union Square, San Francisco, California; as Tharp and Holmes, with sculptor Robert Ingersoll Aitken
- Grant Building (1904), 1095 Market Street, San Francisco
- Pacific Telephone and Telegraph Company Building (built 1905) 445 Bush Street, San Francisco, California; a former firehouse
- San Francisco Fire Department Engine Co. Number 2 (built 1908), 460 Bush Street, San Francisco, California; NRHP-listed
- Engine House No. 31 (built 1908), 1088 Green Street, San Francisco, California; NRHP-listed
- San Francisco General Hospital (built 1909), corner of 23rd and Potrero Street, San Francisco, California; Tharp designed the six earliest buildings with brick pattern work, in the 1930s the entrance was designed by Martin Rist
- Clarendon Hall at Laguna Honda Hospital (1910), San Francisco, California; demolished
- Commercial High School (1910), Fell Street at Franklin Street, San Francisco, California; completed after his death, and named in his honor as Newton Tharp Commercial High School
- Hall of Justice (2nd version, built 1912), southeast corner of Kearny and Washington Streets, San Francisco, California; actively used from 1912–1961
