= Tiffany Building (San Francisco) =

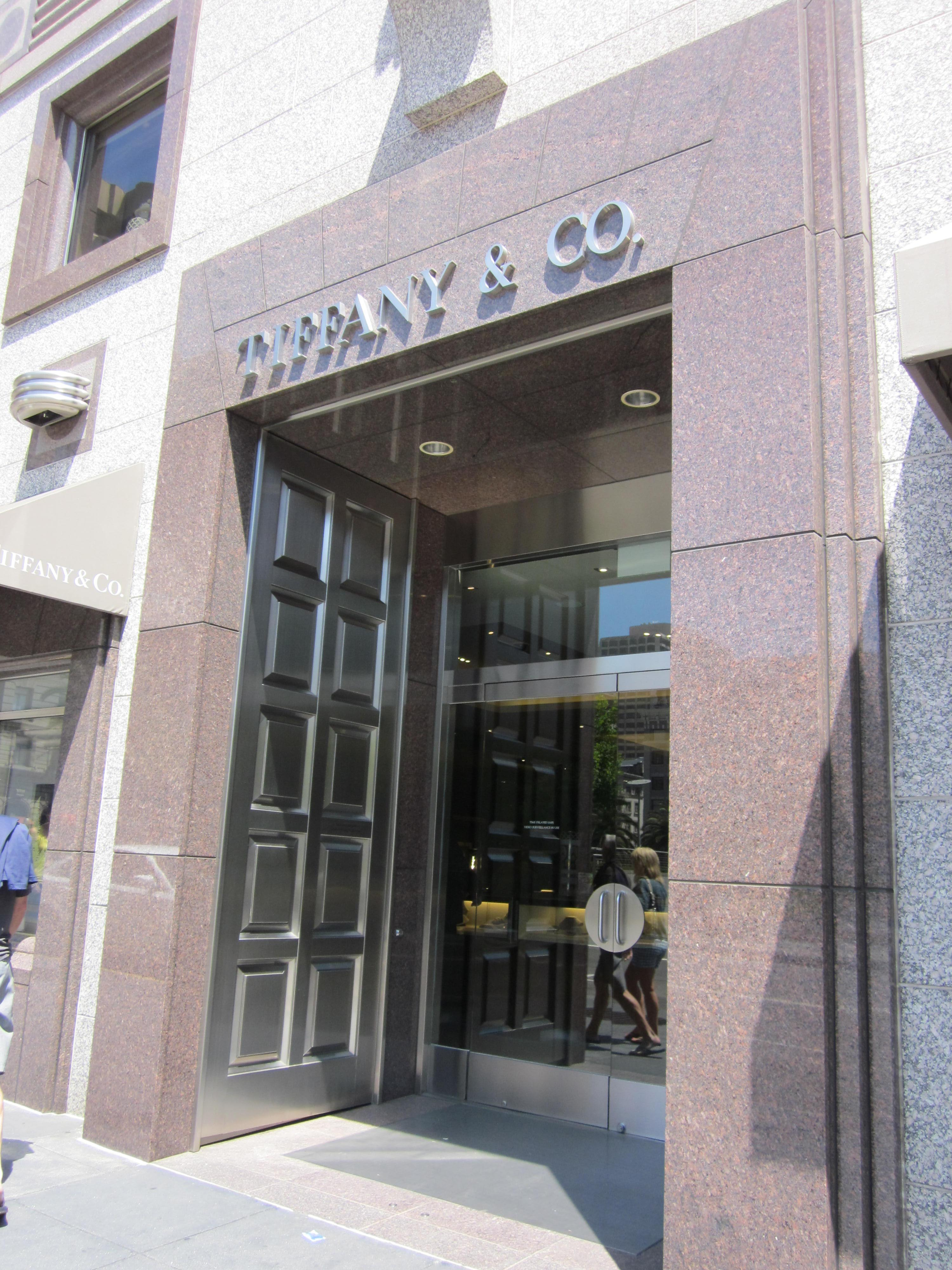
- The entrance to the Tiffany building in Union Square

- Location within San Francisco Location within California Location within the United States

General information
- Status: Completed
- Type: Commercial offices
- Location: 350 Post Street; San Francisco, California
- Coordinates: 37.78859°N 122.40768°W
- Completed: 1972; 54 years ago

Technical details
- Floor count: 11
- Floor area: 17,000 square feet (1,600 m^{2})

Design and construction
- Developer: Skidmore, Owings & Merrill

The Tiffany Building is an eleven-story, 100,000-square-foot (9,300 m^{2}) building at Union Square in San Francisco.; the bottom two floors contain a Tiffany & Co. store, while the upper floors contain offices. It is also known as 350 Post Street and the Qantas Building.

The Tiffany store has 17,000 square feet (1,600 m^{2}) of space. Cathay Pacific maintains its North America regional headquarters on the third floor of the Tiffany Building, in Suite 300. The Kenmark Real Estate Group, which manages the building, has its headquarters on the building's top floor.

== History ==
In 1972 Skidmore, Owings & Merrill completed the construction of the building which had been destined for Qantas. The building followed a 140-foot (43 m) height limit established for Union Square by the San Francisco Planning Commission. It was designed to be a background building between two Classical buildings. A guide to the local architecture said that it "looms blandly over the stripped[sic] palazzo that is Saks." Kenneth Halpern said that in relation to the Fitzhugh Building, the Qantas Building matched the color and height and roughly matched the proportions.

At one time the Consulate-General of Australia in San Francisco was located in the building. The Consulate General of Tonga was also previously located in the building before relocating to Burlingame in 2014.

The San Francisco Tiffany & Co. was scheduled to move into its current location in the building in October 1991. Werner & Sullivan built the store. John Loring, a senior vice president and design director for Tiffany & Co. and a committee of the company designed the store. The company planned to include an Art Deco-style granite arch with a stainless steel door framed inside and other features common to Tiffany & Co. stores. The store acquired a reproduction of the Atlas clock to place above the entrance. The store, previously at a location on Grant Street, more than doubled in size from 8,000 square feet (740 m^{2}) to 17,000 square feet (1,600 m^{2}). At the time it was the company's second largest store, after the New York City flagship store.

Qantas Investments US Inc sold the building in early 1996.

The Cathay Pacific North America headquarters moved from El Segundo in Greater Los Angeles to the Tiffany Building in 2005. The headquarters had only been in Los Angeles for 15 years as they were in San Francisco from the 1970s. Cathay had moved to Greater Los Angeles in 1990.

Before the Cathay Pacific USA headquarters opened in the Tiffany Building, the airline identified over twenty employees including eleven new staff from the San Francisco Bay Area. Cathay Pacific said "wanted to focus its attention on the Northern California market due to the cultural and economic ties that the Bay Area has with Hong Kong and Northern California's Chinese American community. Cathay Pacific cited the San Francisco to Hong Kong nonstop flight as a factor.

The grand opening of the Cathay Pacific USA headquarters was held on February 15, 2005. It included a ribbon cutting ceremony, a roast pig cutting ceremony, and the lion dance. The dance and pig cutting are Chinese customs meant to facilitate good luck. Gavin Newsom, the Mayor of San Francisco, proclaimed that day to be "Cathay Pacific Airways Day in San Francisco."
