= San Francisco Fire Department Engine Co. Number 2 =

- U.S. National Register of Historic Places
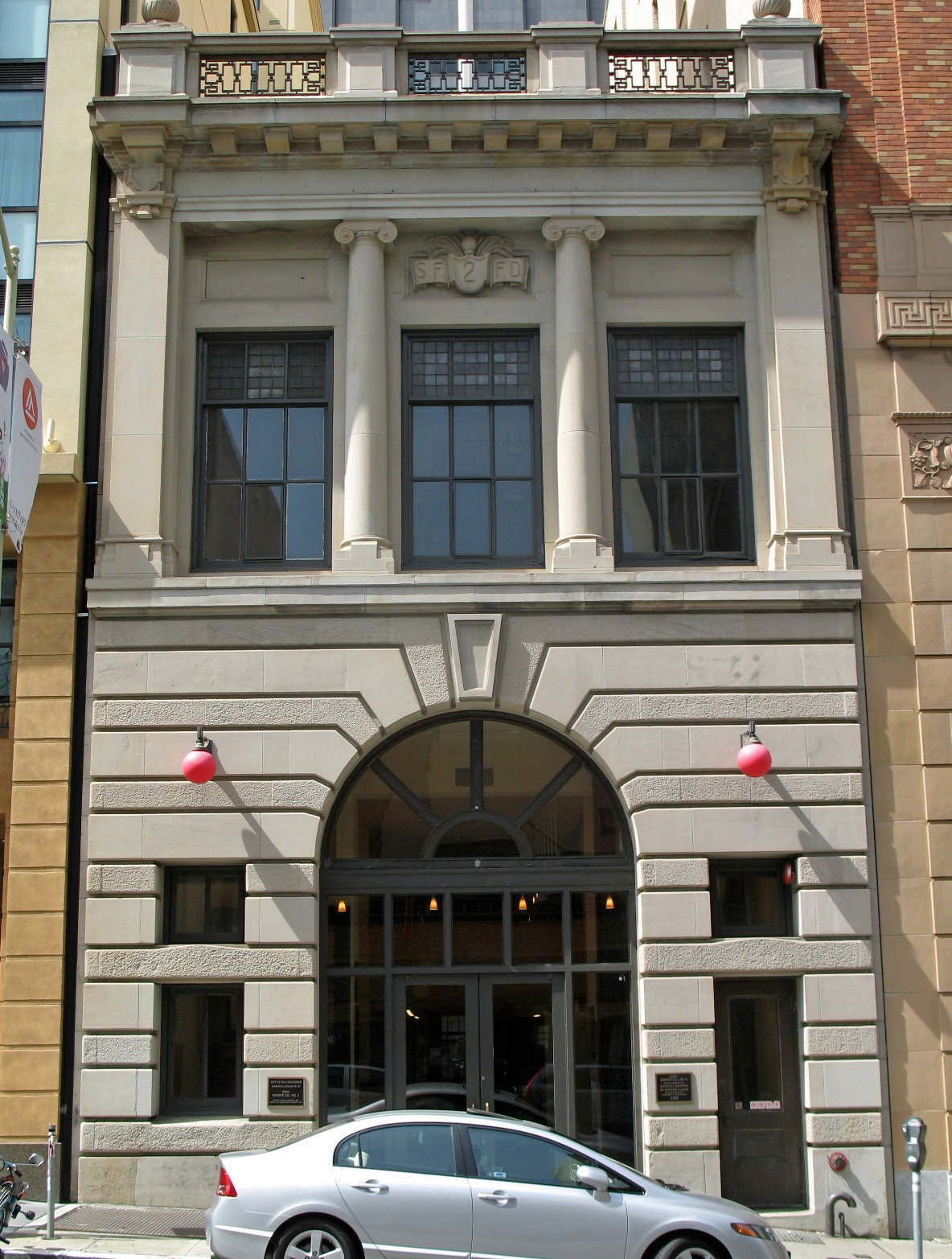

- Location within San Francisco County Location within California Location within the United States
- Location: 460 Bush St., San Francisco, California
- Coordinates: 37°47′27″N 122°24′18″W
- Area: less than one acre
- Built: 1908
- Architect: Newton J. Tharp
- Architectural style: Beaux Arts
- NRHP reference No.: 02000371
- Added to NRHP: April 17, 2002

San Francisco Fire Department Engine Co. Number 2, at 460 Bush Street in San Francisco, California, United States, was built in 1908. It was listed on the National Register of Historic Places in 2002.

It was designed by city architect Newton J. Tharp in Beaux Arts style. It is a two-story three-bay building with a projecting entablature and a raised parapet, clad with warm gray stone.
