= Engine House No. 31 (San Francisco, California) =

- U.S. National Register of Historic Places
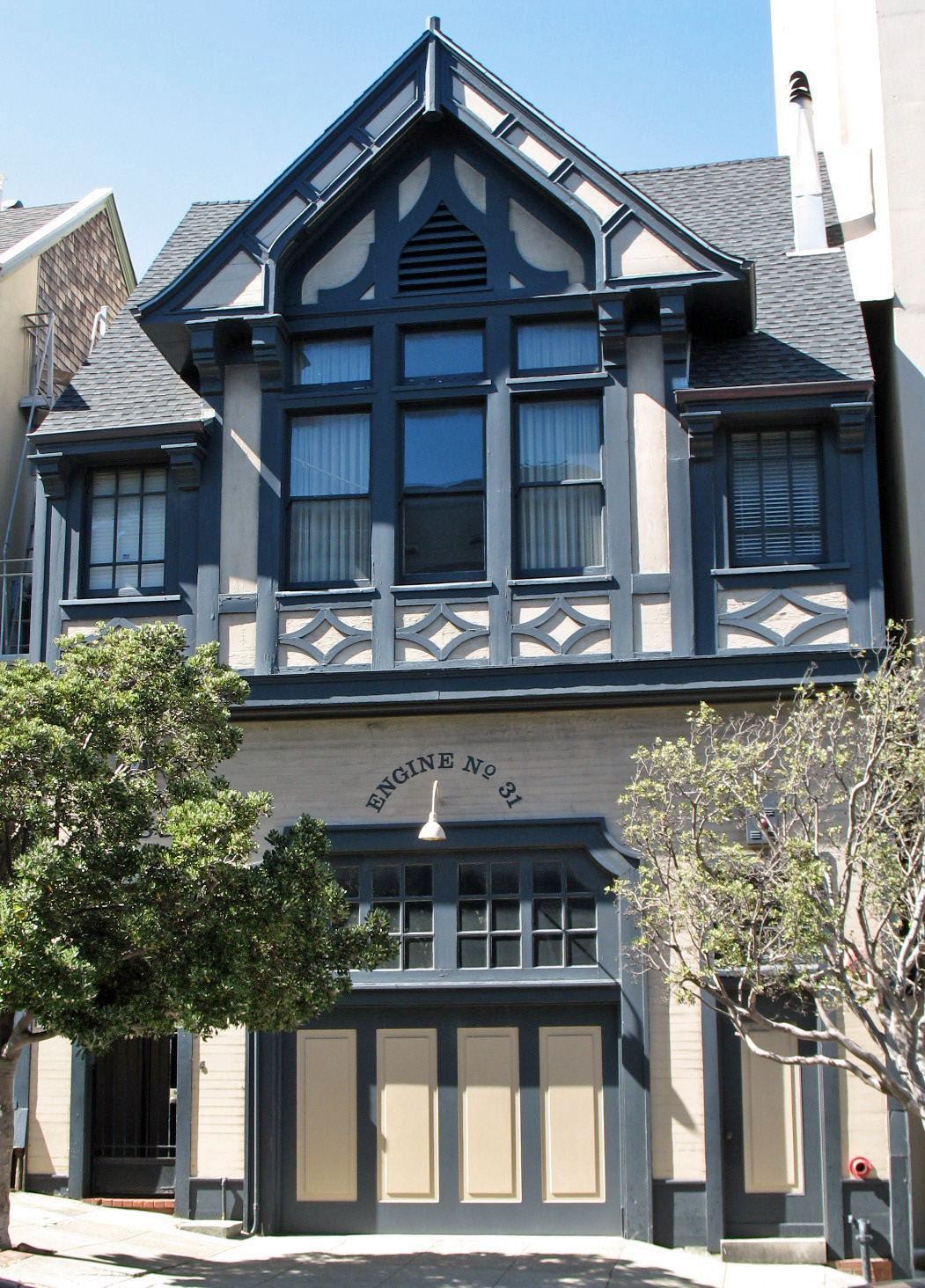

- Location within San Francisco County Location within California Location within the United States
- Location: 1088 Green St., San Francisco, California
- Coordinates: 37°47′55″N 122°25′01″W
- Area: 0.1 acres (0.040 ha)
- Built: 1908
- Architects: City Architecture Department, Newton J. Tharp
- Architectural style: Bungalow/craftsman, Tudor Revival
- NRHP reference No.: 87002290
- Added to NRHP: January 7, 1988

Engine House No. 31, in the Russian Hill neighborhood of San Francisco, California, was built in 1908. It was listed on the National Register of Historic Places in 1988. It is also called Russian Hill Firehouse.

== History ==
It is located at 1088 Green St. and is now a private residence. It was operational as a fire station from 1908 until 1952.
