= Dewey Monument =

Monument in Union Square, San Francisco, California, U.S.

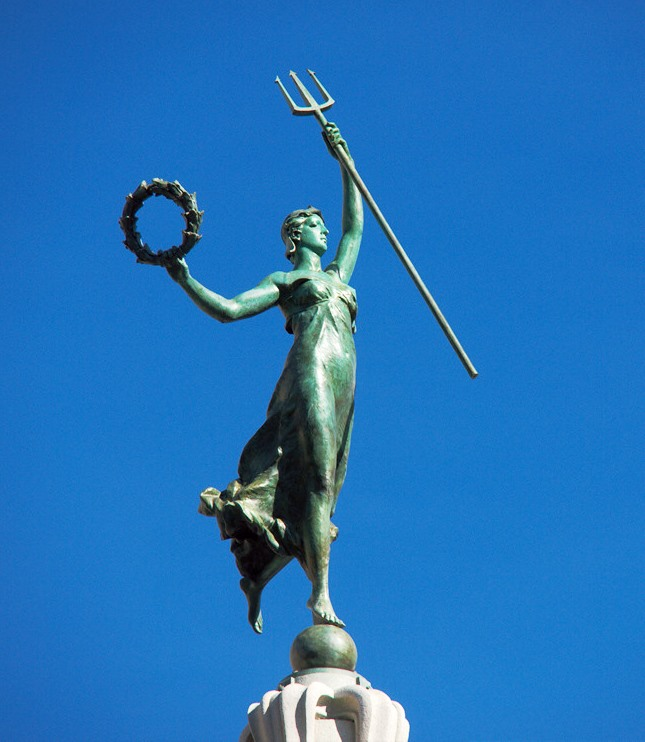
- The Goddess of Victory statue by Robert Ingersoll Aitken atop the Dewey Monument (2010)
- Interactive map of Dewey Monument
- Location: Union Square; San Francisco, U.S.
- Coordinates: 37.78795°N 122.40755°W
- Designer: Robert Ingersoll Aitken, sculptor Newton Tharp, architect
- Width: 5 ft (1.5 m)
- Height: 85 ft (25.9 m)
- Beginning date: 1901
- Completion date: 1903
- Dedicated to: Admiral George Dewey

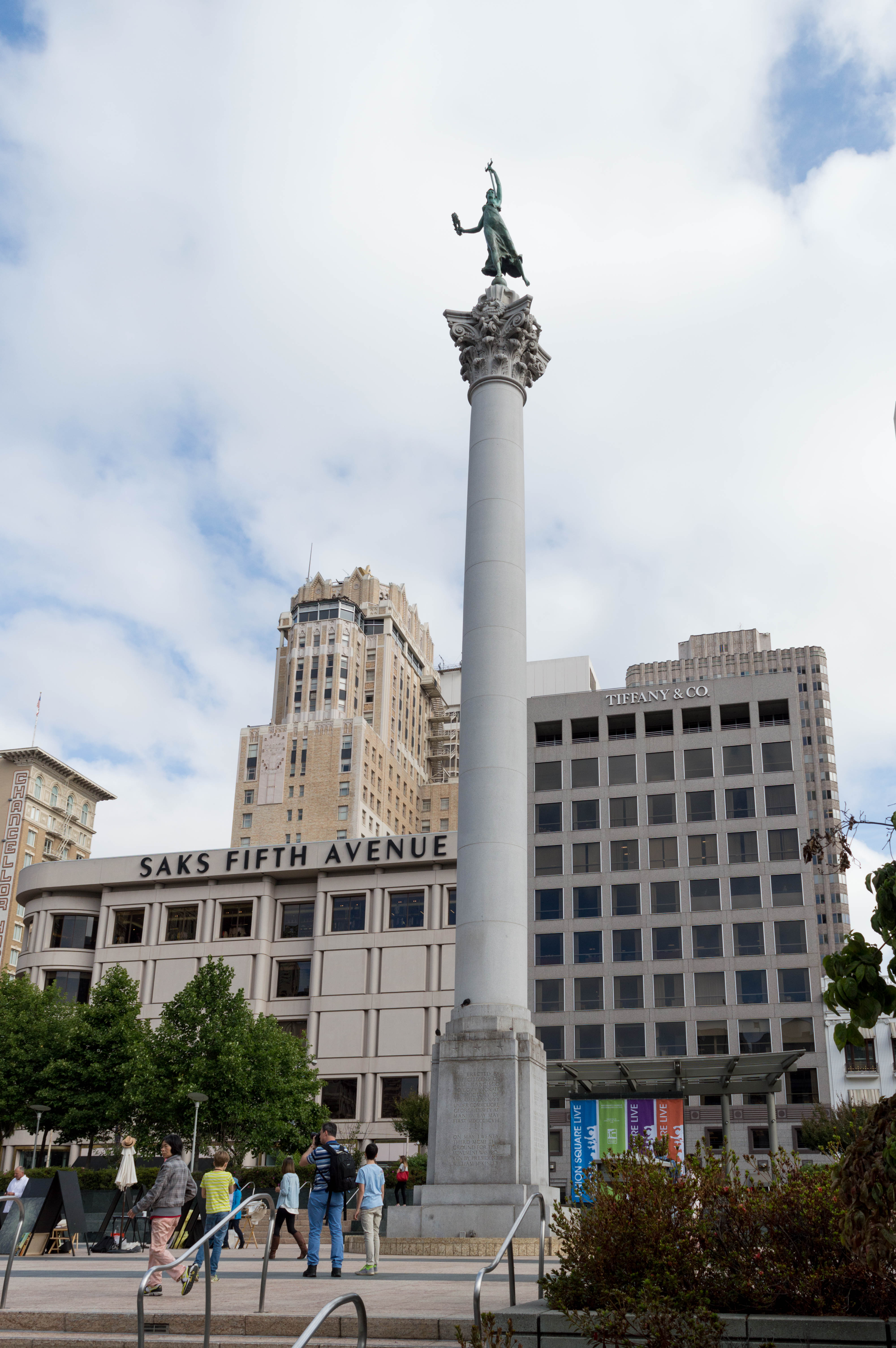
The monument (2015)

The Dewey Monument is a memorial statue by Robert Ingersoll Aitken in San Francisco, California, located at the center of Union Square. Union Square is bounded by Geary, Powell, Post and Stockton streets. The monument is dedicated to Admiral George Dewey and commemorates his victory in the Battle of Manila Bay during the Spanish–American War. Work on the monument began in 1901 and it was dedicated in 1903.

== History and description ==
The monument was erected to honor Admiral George Dewey, a hero of the Spanish–American War, for his victory in the Battle of Manila Bay.

On May 23, 1901, President William McKinley visited San Francisco to break ground for the monument. Six months later McKinley was assassinated and was succeeded by his vice president, Theodore Roosevelt. On May 14, 1903, Roosevelt officially dedicated the monument, which "commemorates the victory of Admiral George Dewey and the American fleet over Spanish forces at Manila Bay, the Philippines, on May 1, 1898, during the Spanish–American War" and also is a tribute to the sailors of the United States Navy.

Robert Ingersoll Aitken was hired to sculpt a 9-foot (2.7 m) statue representing Nike, the ancient Greek Goddess of Victory in honor of McKinley and Dewey. The statue holds a trident that represents Dewey and a wreath that represents McKinley. There are several stories about who modeled for Aitken's statue. One story holds that Aitken hired Alma de Bretteville (later Alma Spreckels), who he knew from the Mark Hopkins Institute of Art, to model for the statue. This version of the story was endorsed by San Francisco columnist Herb Caen and later in the Alma Spreckels biography, Big Alma. However, a 1902 San Francisco Chronicle article hailing the statue's completion and giving details on the progress of the monument states that the model who posed for the statue was Clara Petzold or Petzoldt, a popular artists' model in San Francisco at that time.

Architect Newton Tharp designed the base and column within a budget of $45,000. The column, over 5 ft (1.5 m) in diameter and over 85 ft (25.9 m) in height, was assembled from individual blocks weighing 40,000 lb (18,144 kg). Timbers over 100 ft (30.5 m) long were shipped from Oregon to support the block and tackle system used to construct the monument.

The column stands on a square base with inscriptions on each side.

The base of the Dewey Monument

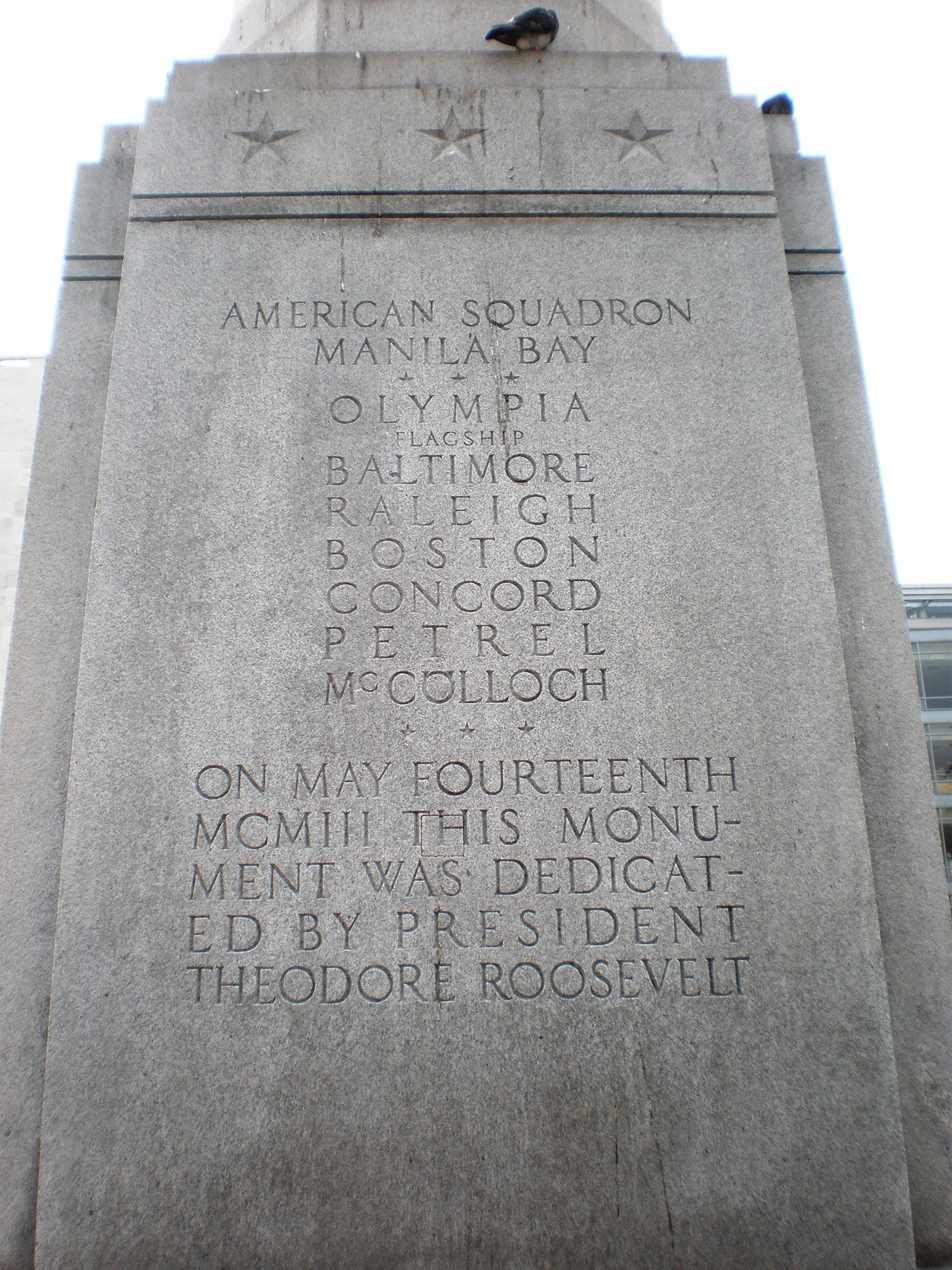
American squadron at Manila Bay: Olympia (flagship), Baltimore, Raleigh, Boston, Concord, Petrel, McColloch.
On May 14, 1903, this monument was dedicated by President Theodore Roosevelt.

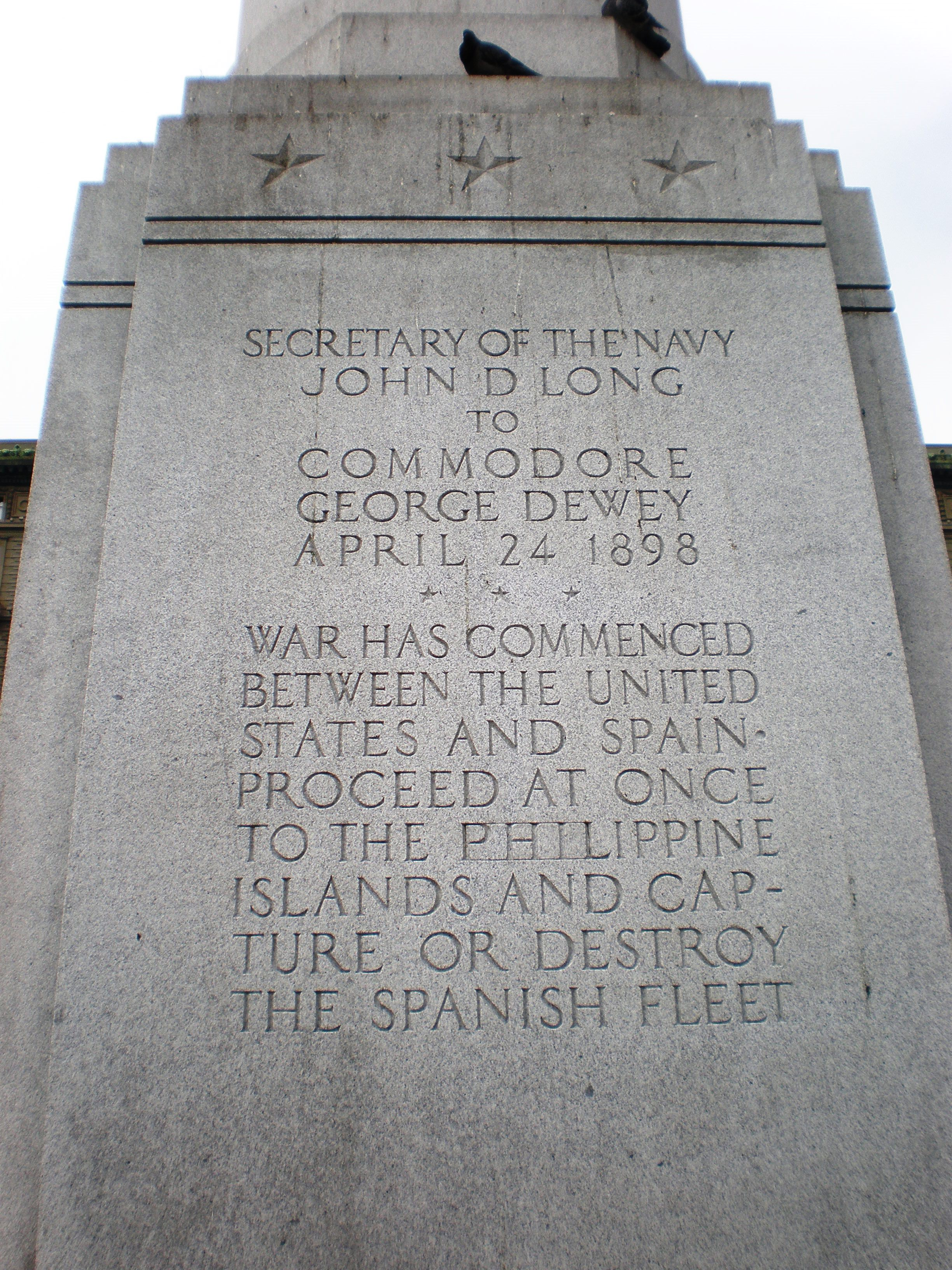
Secretary of the Navy John D. Long to Commodore George Dewey April 24, 1898:
'War has commenced between the United States and Spain. Proceed at once to the Philippine Islands and capture or destroy the Spanish fleet'.

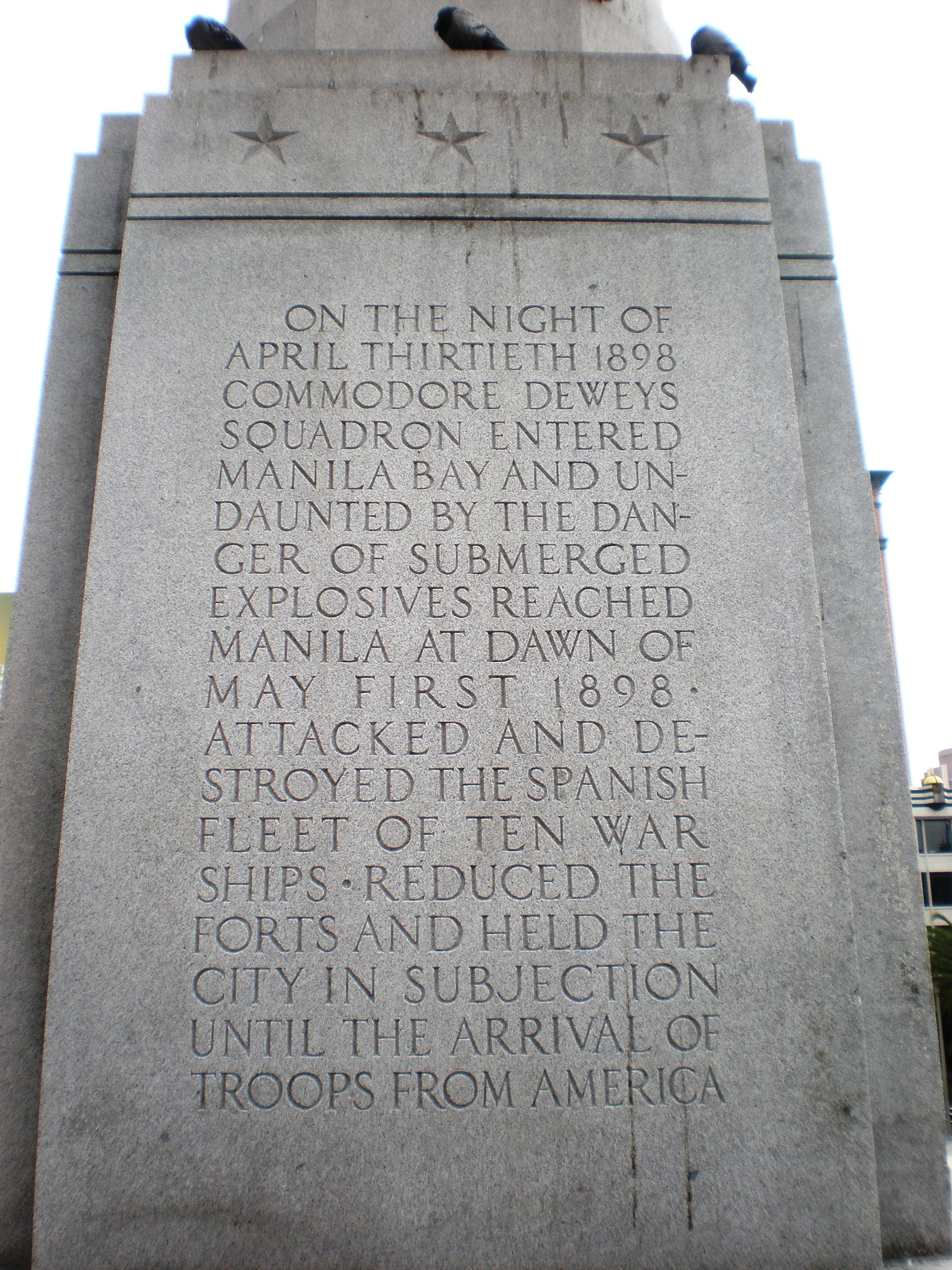
On the night of April 30, 1898 Commodore Dewey's squadron entered Manila Bay and, undaunted by the danger of submerged explosives, reached Manila at dawn of May 1, 1898. Attacked and destroyed the Spanish fleet of ten war ships. Reduced the forts and held the city in subjection until the arrival of troops from America.

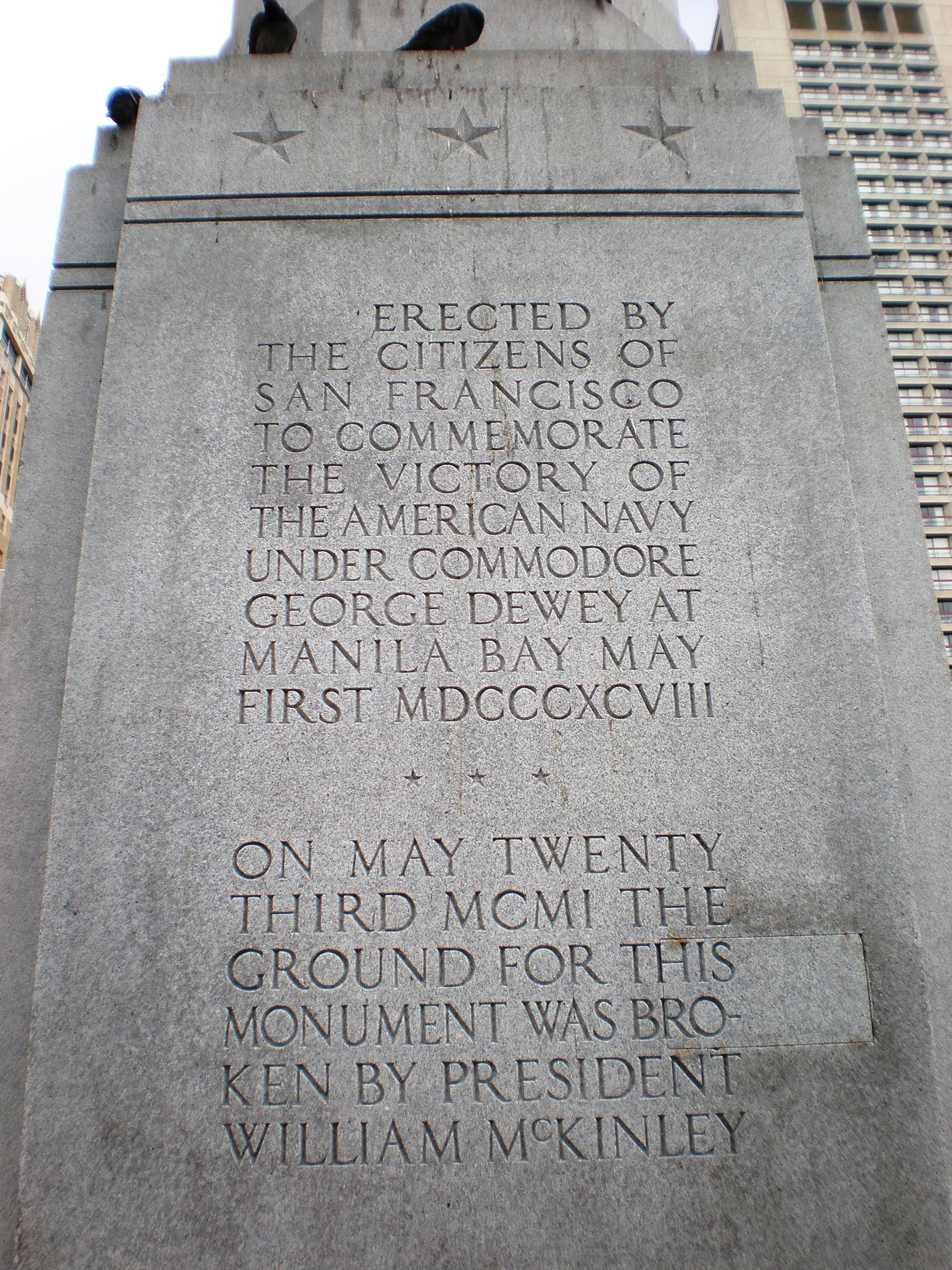
Erected by the citizens of San Francisco to commemorate the victory of the American Navy under Commodore George Dewey at Manila Bay on May 1, 1898.
On May 23, 1901, the ground for this monument was broken by President William McKinley.
