= Union Square, San Francisco =

Neighborhood of San Francisco in California, United States

Union Square
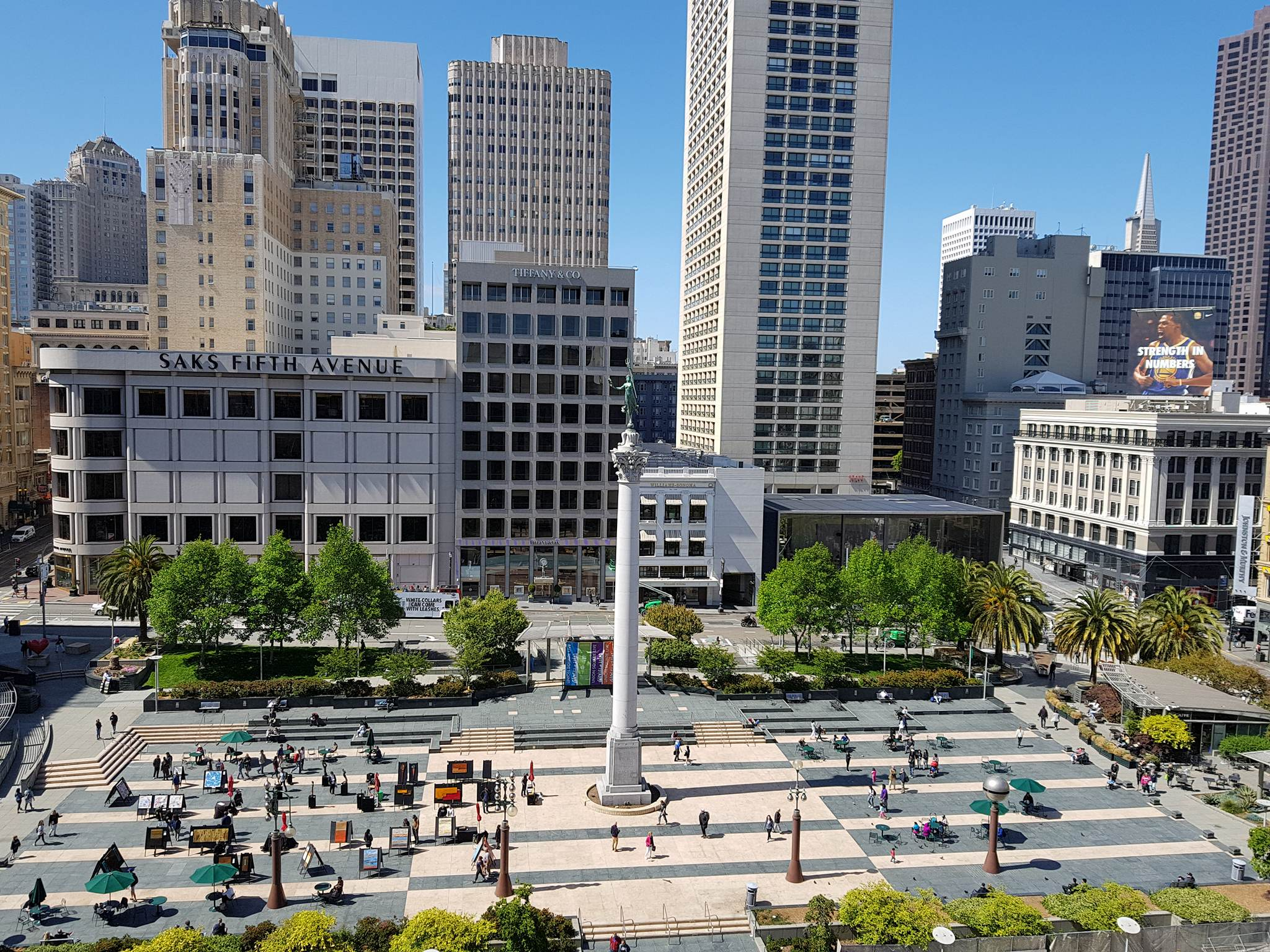
- Overview of the plaza, 2018
- Interactive map of Union Square
- Type: Urban square and neighborhood
- Maintained by: San Francisco Recreation & Parks Department
- Area: 2.6 acres (1.1 ha; 0.0041 mi^{2}; 0.011 km^{2})
- Location: San Francisco, California, United States
- Coordinates: 37.788056°N 122.4075°W

Other
- Website: Official website

California Historical Landmark
- Designated: October 22, 1957
- Reference no.: 623

Union Square is a 2.6-acre (1.1-hectare) public plaza bordered by Geary, Powell, Post, and Stockton Streets in downtown San Francisco, California. "Union Square" also refers to the central shopping, hotel, and theater district surrounding the plaza for several blocks. The area got its name because it was once used for Thomas Starr King rallies and support for the Union army during the American Civil War, earning its designation as a California Historical Landmark.

The one-block plaza and surrounding area was historically home to one of the largest collections of department stores, upscale boutiques, gift shops, art galleries, and beauty salons in the United States, making Union Square a major tourist destination and a well-known gathering place in downtown San Francisco. The Dewey Monument is situated at the center of Union Square. It is a statue of Nike, the ancient Greek goddess of victory.

The COVID-19 pandemic in the United States led to an exodus of companies from Downtown San Francisco, particularly affecting the Union Square retail district.

== History ==
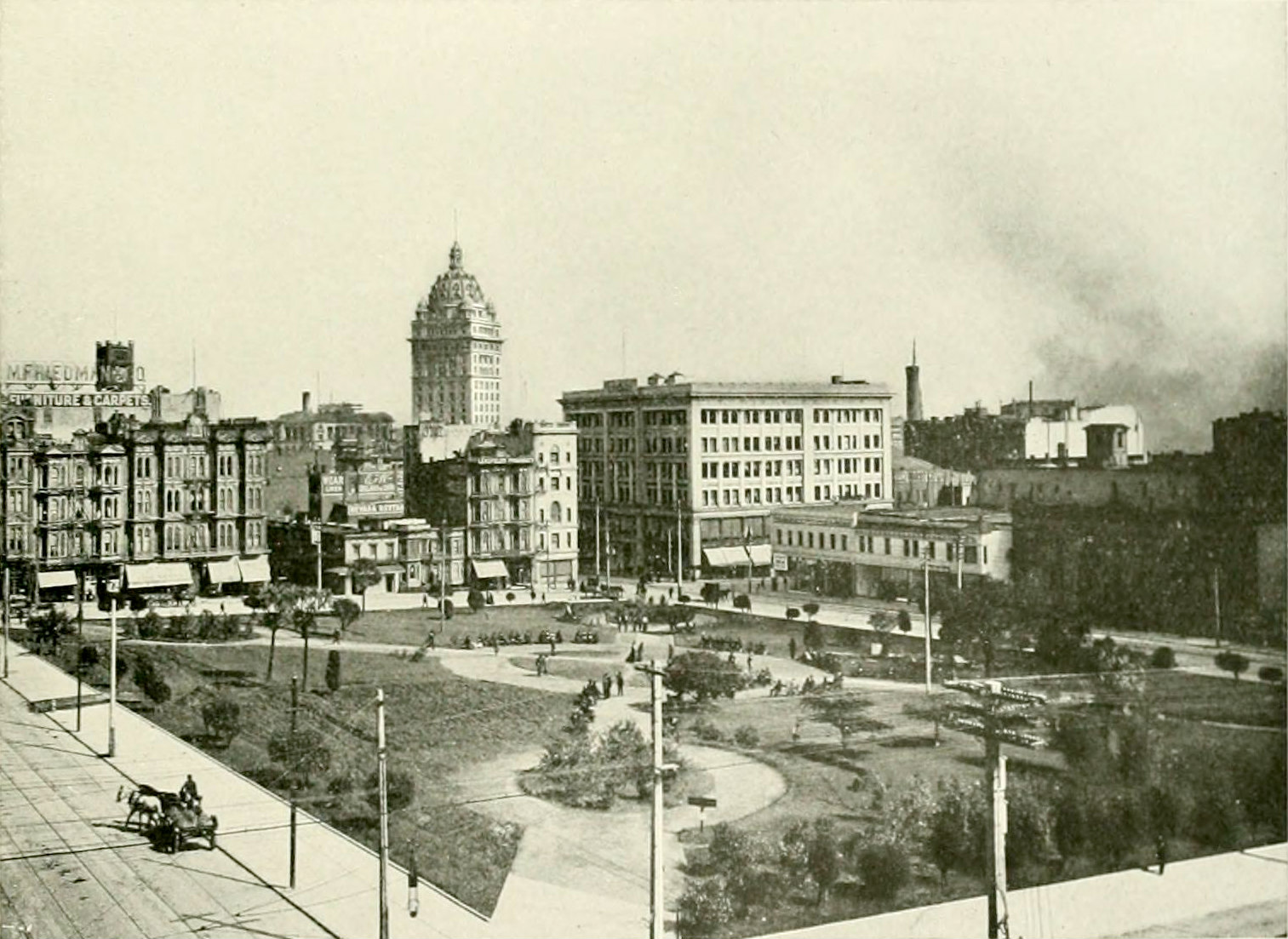
Union Square around 1904

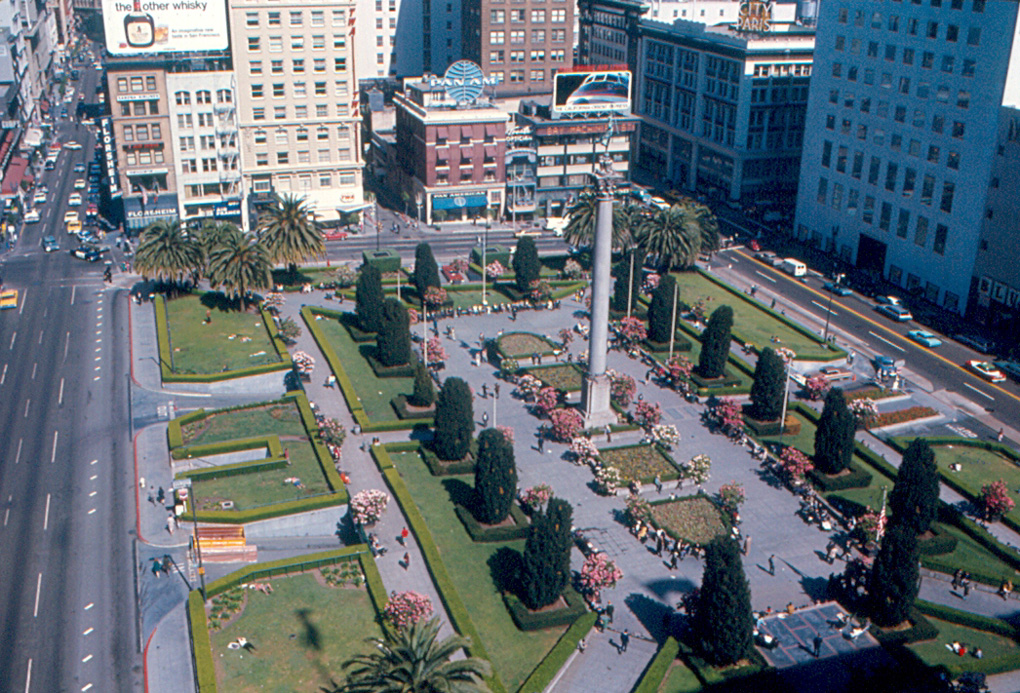
The square in 1968, as seen from the St. Francis Hotel

=== Creation ===
Union Square was originally a large sand dune, and the square was later set aside to be made into a public park in 1850. Union Square got its name from the pro-Union rallies held there on the eve of the Civil War. The monument itself is also a tribute to the sailors of the United States Navy.

Union Square was built and dedicated by San Francisco's first American mayor John Geary in 1850 and is so named for the pro-Union rallies by Thomas Starr King that happened there before and during the United States Civil War. Since then the plaza has undergone many notable changes, one of the most significant happening in 1903 with the dedication of a 97 ft (30 m) tall monument to Admiral George Dewey's victory at the Battle of Manila Bay during the Spanish–American War. It also commemorates U.S. President William McKinley, who had been recently assassinated. Executed by Robert Aitken, the statue at the top of the monument, "Victory," was modeled after a voluptuous Danish-American stenographer and artist's model, Alma de Bretteville, who eventually married one of San Francisco's richest citizens. Another significant change happened between 1939 and 1941 when a large underground parking garage was built under the square; this meant the plaza's lawns, shrubs and the Dewey monument were now on the garage "roof." Designed by Timothy Pflueger, it was the world's first underground parking garage.

=== Post WWII ===
For many decades, Union Square was the largest retail shopping district outside of New York and Chicago, the place that everyone in San Francisco and the larger San Francisco Bay Area visited "on a semi-regular basis, whether they were looking for a night on the town or a place to buy the basics". During the middle part of the 20th century, "going downtown" for a full day of lavish shopping and eating was a special treat for Bay Area residents—to the point that families often dressed up for the occasion. However, as travel writer Suzy Gershman pointed out, "the architecture is downright weird" and fails to "com[e] together visually" as one looks around at the buildings facing the square: "It has no feeling of fun or beauty, or even sense of place". Over time, both locals and tourists began to drift off to other neighborhoods slowly, leaving Union Square to "conventioneers and casual tourists".

The area became somewhat derelict during the late 1970s and through the 1980s and 1990s as homeless people began to camp in the plaza. San Francisco's rowdy New Year's parties used to happen yearly at the plaza, often followed by some sort of civil disruption and rioting happening afterward. In early 1998, city planners began plans to renovate the plaza to create more paved surfaces for easier maintenance, with outdoor cafes and more levels to the underground garage.

=== 2000 to 2020 ===
In late 2000, the park was partially closed to renovate the park and the parking garage. On July 25, 2002, the park reopened and a ceremony was held with then Mayor Willie Brown. In 2004 Unwire Now, a company founded by entrepreneur Jaz Banga, launched a free Wi-Fi network in Union Square which was championed by Mayor Gavin Newsom.

In 2016, the vacancy rate around Union Square was only 3%.

=== 2020 to present ===
During 2020, the vacancy rate in the area rose to 9.4% after the onset of the COVID-19 pandemic.

In May 2023, The San Francisco Standard counted 203 retailers operating in or near Union Square as of 2019. This count omitted tenants of the San Francisco Centre; it counted only true retailers and omitted service-oriented establishments like restaurants. Four years later, only 107 (53%) of those retailers were still in business, while 96 (47%) had closed.

== Events ==
Union Square hosts public concerts and events. Public views of the square can be seen from surrounding high places such as the Sir Francis Drake Hotel, Macy's top floor, and the Grand Hyatt hotel. The Union Square Business Improvement District was founded in 1999 and focused primarily on cleaning and safety issues. The BID also deals with marketing, advocacy, streetscapes, and capital improvement programs. The Union Square BID has been criticized by some as acting in a harassing manner toward homeless people at times, to deter them from being there.

During the holiday season, an ice skating rink and Christmas tree are set up.

Since 1975, Union Square has hosted the annual lighting of the Bill Graham Menorah, the first giant public menorah installed outside Israel. The 22-foot-wide, 15-foot-tall display was established with Graham's support and is lit on each night of Hanukkah.

== Public art ==
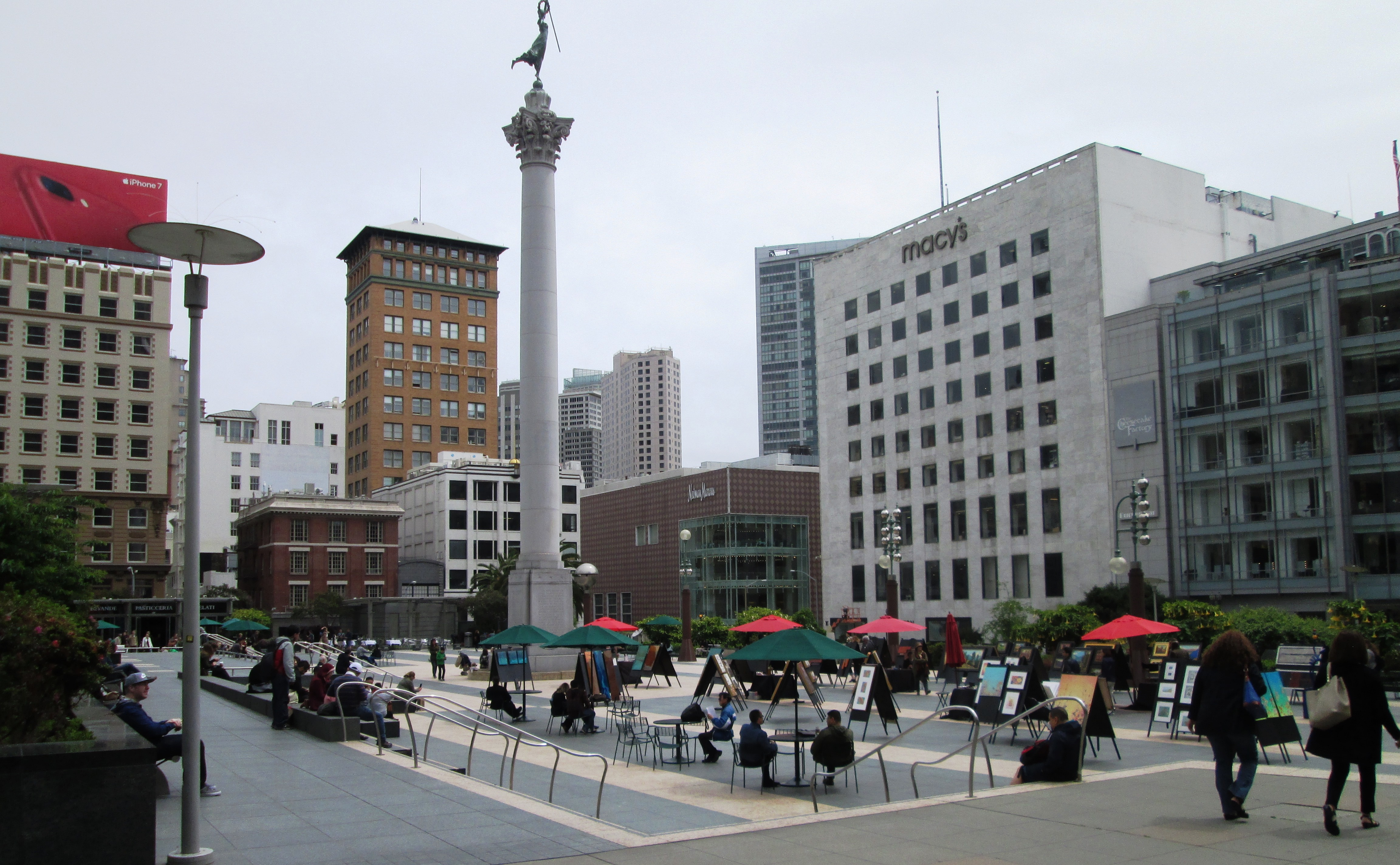
Dewey Monument in 2017

At the center of Union Square stands the Dewey Monument, an 85-foot (26 m) column on which stands a 9-foot (2.7 m) statue of Nike, the ancient Greek Goddess of Victory. The monument is dedicated to Admiral George Dewey, a hero of the Spanish–American War for his victory at the Battle of Manila Bay in 1898. The monument was dedicated in 1903.

Beginning in 2009, painted heart sculptures from the Hearts in San Francisco public art installation have been installed in each of the square's four corners.

== Economy ==
The Tiffany Building is an 11-story, 100,000-square-foot (9,300 m^{2}) building at Union Square; the bottom two floors contain a Tiffany & Co. store, while the upper floors contain offices.

The only hotel located on Union Square is the Westin St. Francis hotel which is celebrated for its historic Magneta Grandfather Clock. It is believed to be the only hotel in the world that offers its guests, as a courtesy, a coin washing service. The process originated in 1938 at a time when high-society ladies wore white gloves that were easily tarnished during the exchange of money. It uses borax soap in an antiquated, manually operated burnisher.

== Nearby attractions ==
Union Square has also come to describe not just the plaza itself but the general shopping, dining, and theater districts within the surrounding blocks. The Geary and Curran theaters one block west on Geary anchor the "theater district" and border the Tenderloin.

At the end of Powell Street two blocks south, where the cable cars turn around beside Hallidie Plaza at Market Street, is a growing retail corridor that is connected to the SOMA district. Nob Hill, with its grand mansions, apartment buildings, and hotels, stands northwest of Union Square. Directly northeast is Chinatown, with its famous dragon gate at Grant Avenue and Bush Street.

The city's historic French Quarter is northeast of Union Square and centers on the Belden Place alleyway between Bush and Pine Streets and Claude Lane off Bush Street. This area has many open-air French Restaurants and Cafes. Every year, the area is the site of the boisterous Bastille Day celebration, the nation's largest of its kind, and Bush Street is temporarily renamed "Buisson."

Directly east of the square off of Stockton Street is Maiden Lane, a short and narrow alley of exclusive boutiques and cafes that leads to the Financial District and boasts the Xanadu Gallery, San Francisco's only building designed by Frank Lloyd Wright—with its interior most notable for being the predecessor for New York City's Guggenheim Museum. The square is part of the Barbary Coast Trail, linking many San Francisco landmarks.

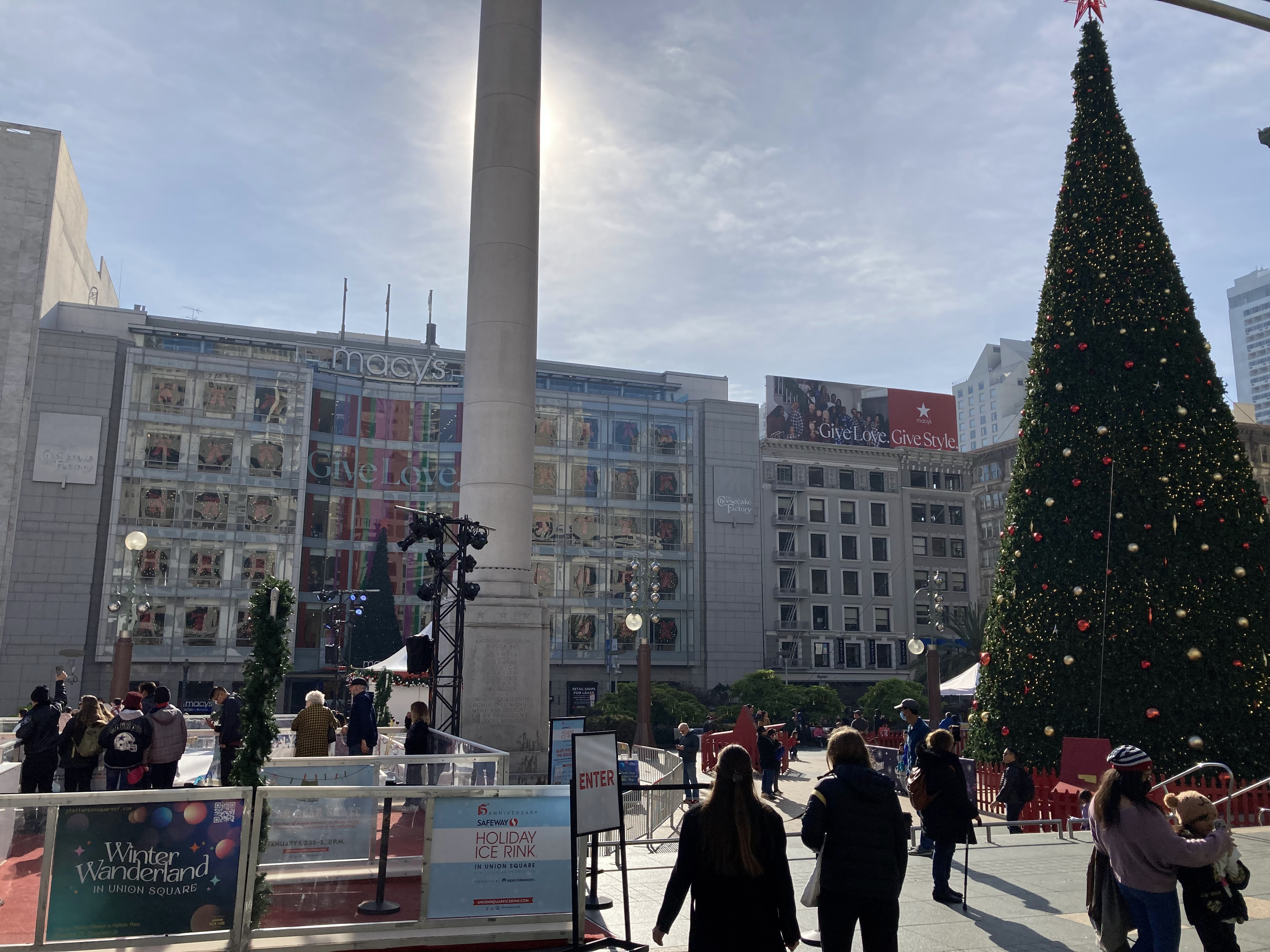
Ice skating and Christmas tree on display at Union Square during December 2022.

== Shopping ==
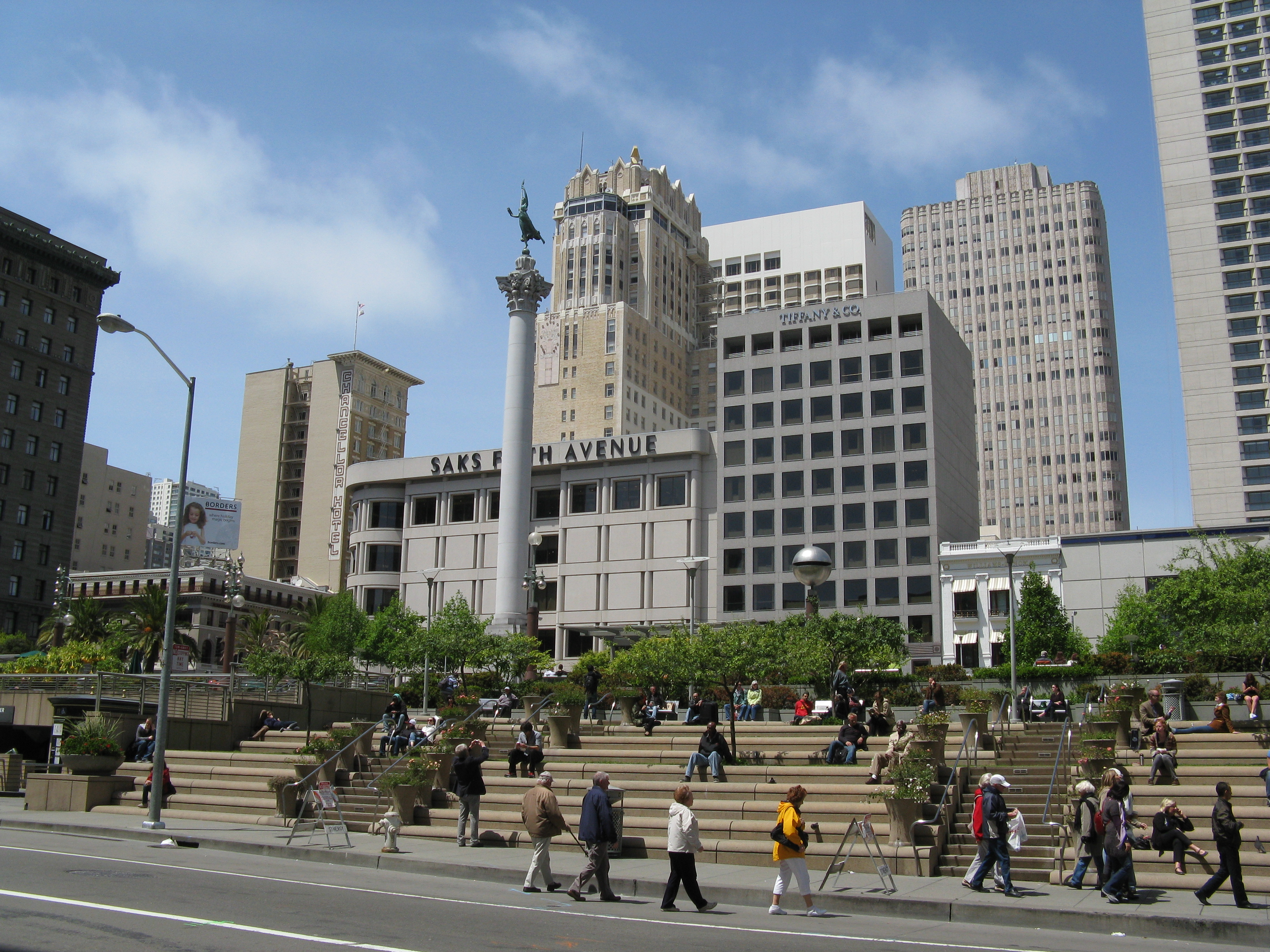
Some of the department stores along the square, 2011

Over the years, Union Square became a popular shopping destination. Several department stores sit within the three-block radius of Union Square, including Neiman Marcus, Macy's, and Saks Fifth Avenue. Barneys New York formerly operated a Union Square store which closed in 2019. Bloomingdale's anchors the nearby San Francisco Centre, a shopping mall built in 1988 on nearby Market Street. Nordstrom was formerly an anchor at San Francisco Centre and also operated a Nordstrom Rack store a block away, but closed both stores in 2023.

A mix of upscale boutiques and popular retailers occupy many buildings surrounding Union Square. Among the luxury retailers that front Union Square are Louis Vuitton, Gucci, Bulgari, Loro Piana, Moncler, and jeweler Tiffany & Co.; while flagship Victoria's Secret, Williams Sonoma, Nike, and Apple stores also occupy buildings surrounding Union Square. Other notable brands in the surrounding area include Chanel, Prada, Burberry, Salvatore Ferragamo, Shapur Mozaffarian, Goyard, Dior and Cartier.

Gap Inc., which is headquartered less than a mile away on the Embarcadero, used to operate multiple flagship and full-line stores for The Gap, Banana Republic, and Old Navy in and around Union Square. However, all those stores closed in the early 2020s, and eventually, only a small upscale flagship store for Banana Republic reopened in October 2023.

On February 27, 2024, it was reported that Macy's would be closing their West Coast flagship store at Union Square as part of a plan to close 150 stores nationwide by the end of 2026. Macy's stated that the store would remain open until the property was sold to a new owner. More than 400 employees were expected to be impacted during the closure.

Video game company Nintendo opened its second US retail store in Union Square in 2025.

== Transportation ==
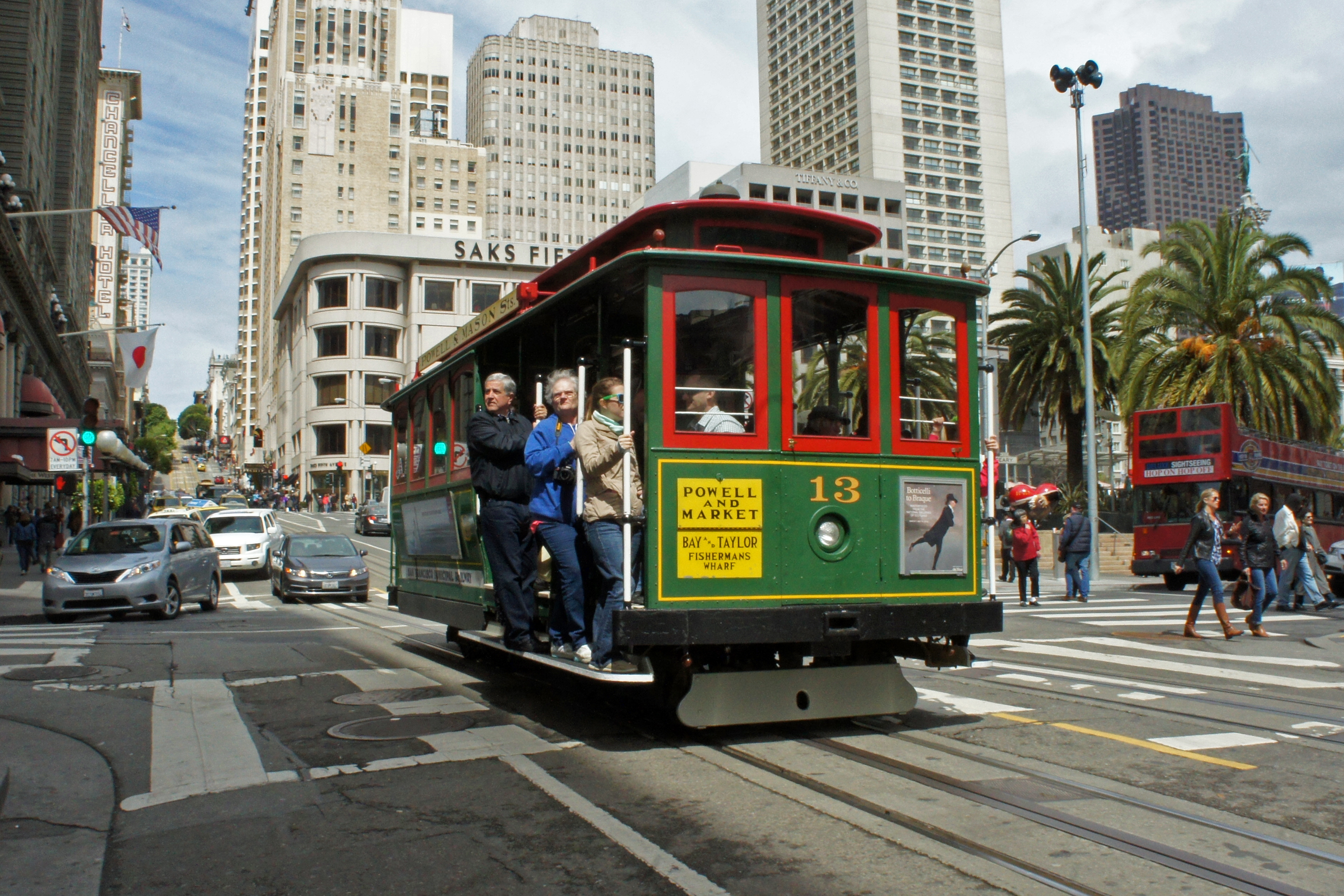
Cable car along the square, 2015

Two cable car lines (Powell-Hyde and Powell-Mason) serve Union Square on Powell Street.

In addition, Union Square is served by many trolleybus and bus lines and the F Market heritage streetcar. The Muni Metro and BART subway systems both serve the area at nearby Powell Street Station on Market Street. In 2012, Muni began building an extension of its Muni Metro system to connect Union Square and Chinatown with Caltrain and other neighborhoods in San Francisco. After several delays, the extension, known as the Central Subway, opened in January 2023; a new station serving Union Square named Union Square/Market Street station now serves the square directly, which itself is linked to Powell Street station via an underground walkway.

== In popular culture ==
- Scenes of the square and the surrounding neighborhood were featured in Alfred Hitchcock's thriller Vertigo (1958) and the opening scene of his The Birds was filmed at the edge of the square—the character Melanie Daniels (Tippi Hedren) looks up and sees hundreds of birds flying in a circular pattern around the column at the center of the square.
- Francis Ford Coppola shot numerous scenes of The Conversation (1974) in Union Square, where the bugged conversation that forms the foundation of the movie takes place. Mime Robert Shields, who gained fame for his Union Square appearances appears in character in the film
- Philip Kaufman's 1978 film Invasion of the Body Snatchers also features scenes of the square.
- In Blake Edwards' 1962 film Days of Wine and Roses, Jack Lemmon (as Joe Clay) looks at his reflection in the window of the Union Square Lounge on Maiden Lane and realizes he is an alcoholic "bum."

== See also ==
- 49-Mile Scenic Drive
- List of upscale shopping districts
- Theatre District, San Francisco
