= Ash Street School =

Ash Street School may refer to a building in the United States:

- Ash Street School (Worcester, Massachusetts), listed on the National Register of Historic Places
- Ash Street School (Manchester, New Hampshire), NRHP-listed
