= Emory Bannister House =

Historic house in Massachusetts, United States

- U.S. National Register of Historic Places
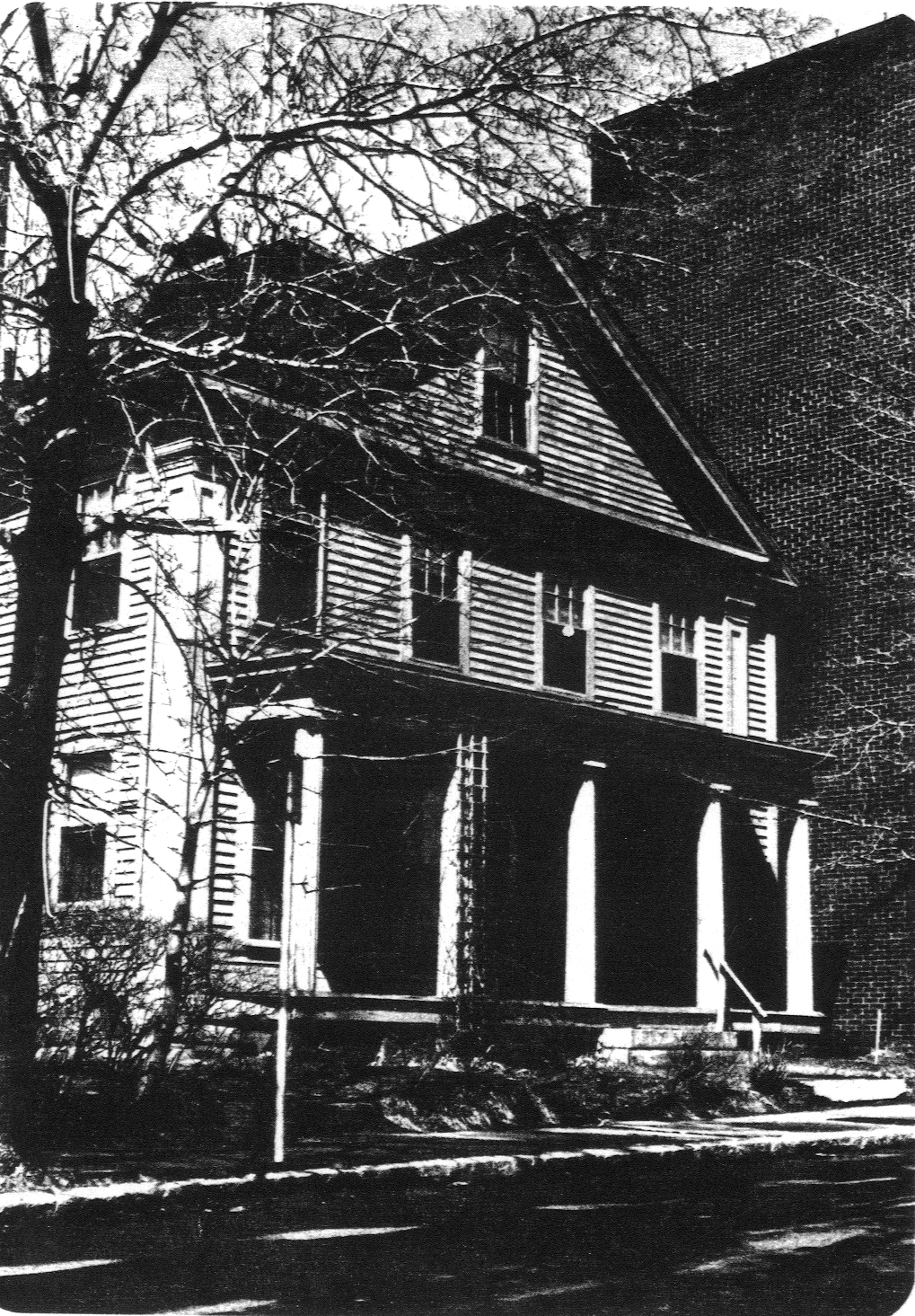
- c. 1977 photo

- Location within Massachusetts Location within the United States
- Location: 3 Harvard St., Worcester, Massachusetts
- Coordinates: 42°16′1″N 71°48′13″W
- Built: 1847
- Architect: Elbridge Boyden
- Architectural style: Greek Revival
- MPS: Worcester MRA
- NRHP reference No.: 80000569
- Added to NRHP: March 05, 1980

The Emory Bannister House was a historic house at 3 Harvard Street in Worcester, Massachusetts. Built in 1847, this Greek Revival house was an early design of Worcester architect Elbridge Boyden, and one of the city's few houses of the period with an identified architect. The house was listed on the National Register of Historic Places in 1980. It was demolished in 1981; its site is now a parking lot.

== Description and history ==
The Emory Bannister House was located near the southern end of Harvard Street, a through street running parallel to and just west of Main Street, but up a steep rise. It was a 2 1/2-story wood-frame structure, with a gabled roof, exterior chimney, and clapboarded exterior. Its front facade was four bays wide, with paneled pilasters at the sides and a fully pedimented gable above. The first floor was sheltered by a full-width porch supported by Doric columns. An ell was added to the north side in 1905.

The house was built in 1847, and was one of the first to be built after Harvard Street was laid out. It was built for Emory Bannister, a local politician and businessman who served as postmaster, city assessor, city alderman, and state representative. It was designed by Elbridge Boyden, then early in his distinguished career, and was built by the Partridge brothers of Barre.

== See also ==
- National Register of Historic Places listings in northwestern Worcester, Massachusetts
- National Register of Historic Places listings in Worcester County, Massachusetts
