= First Congregational Church (Spencer, Massachusetts) =

Church building in Massachusetts, 1862–2023

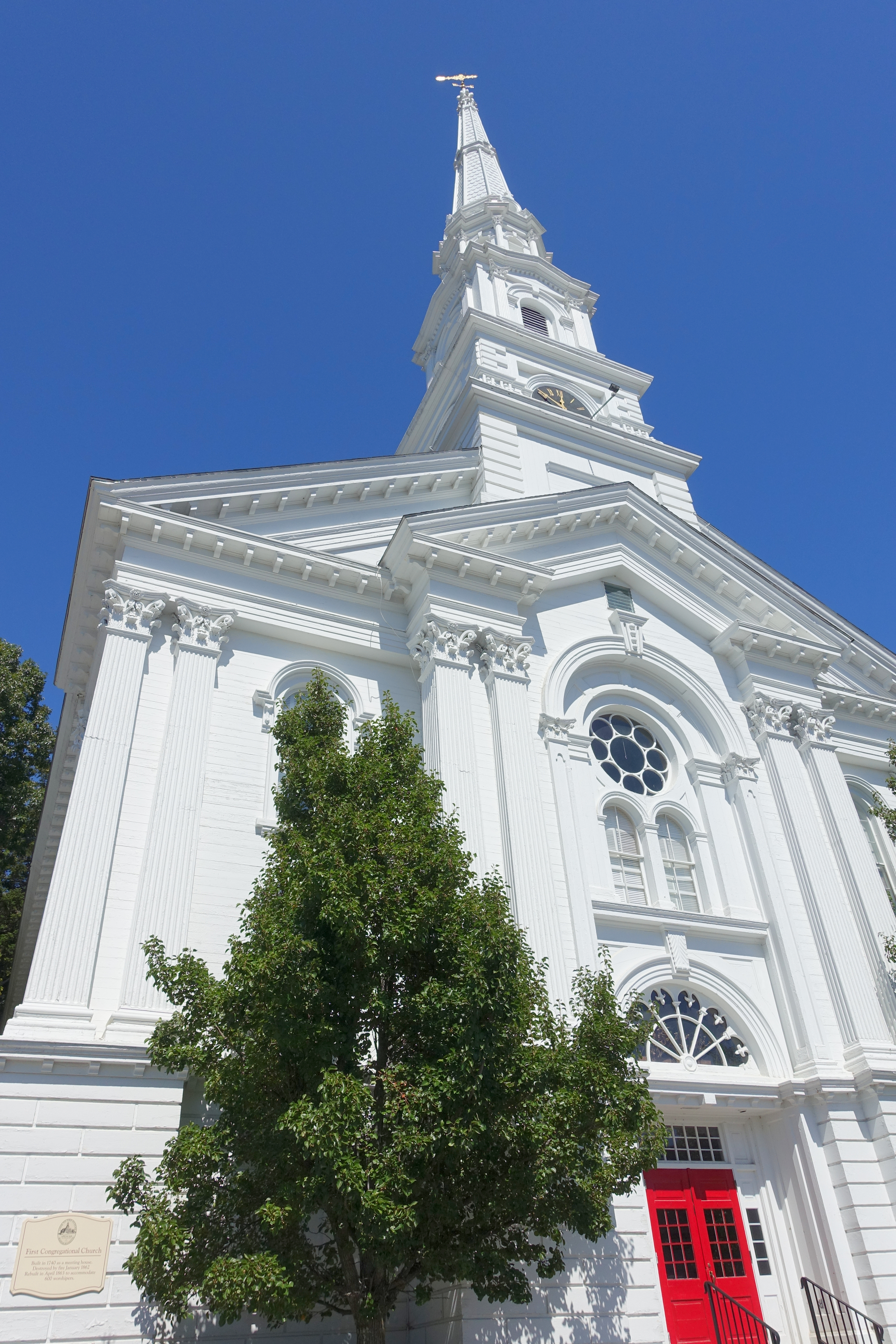
- First Congregational Church, Spencer in 2015

Religion
- Affiliation: Congregationalism
- Ecclesiastical or organisational status: inactive

Location
- Location: Spencer, Massachusetts, United States
- Interactive map of First Congregational Church
- Coordinates: 42.24643°N 71.98906°W

Architecture
- Architect: Elbridge Boyden
- Type: Church
- Completed: 1863
- Destroyed: 2023

The First Congregational Church was a historic church building in Spencer, Massachusetts. The church originates from the mid-1700s. The church designed by architect Elbridge Boyden was destroyed by a fire in 1862 but was rebuilt a year later. The church was expanded in the 1960s. On June 2, 2023, a lightning strike caused another fire which completely destroyed the church. The congregation dates to 1743. In August 2025, construction of a new church commenced on the site. The weather vane from the old church will be incorporated into the new building.
