= Elbridge Boyden =

American architect

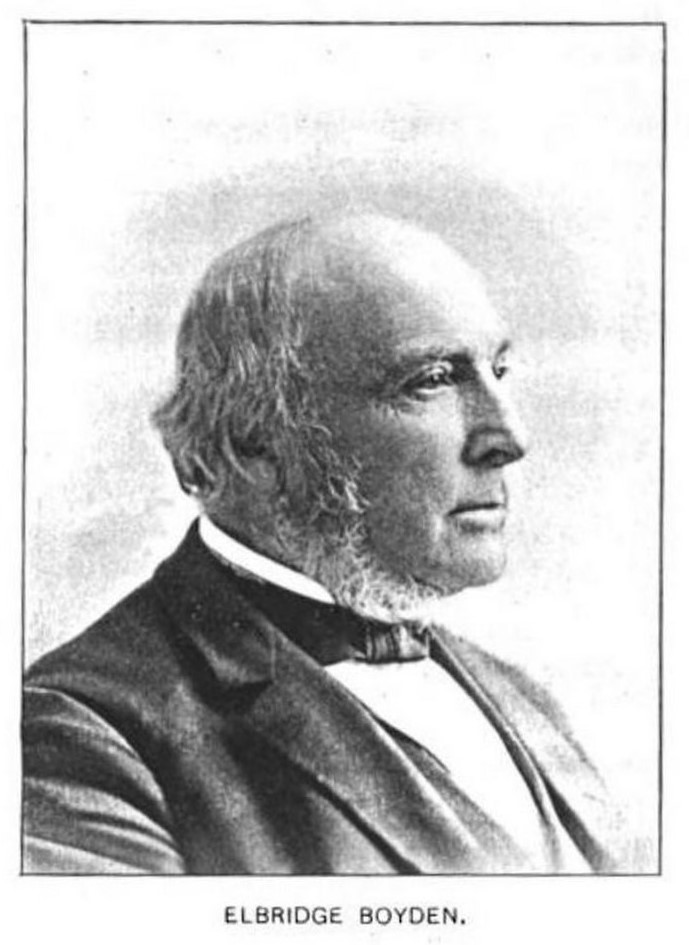
- Elbridge Boyden, 1810-1898
- Born: July 4, 1810; Somerset, Vermont, U.S.
- Died: March 25, 1898 (aged 87); Worcester, Massachusetts, U.S.
- Occupation: Architect
- Practice: Elbridge Boyden, Boyden & Joy, Boyden & Ball, E. Boyden & Son
- Buildings: Taunton State Hospital, Antioch College, Worcester Medical College, Mechanics Hall, Worcester County Courthouse (Fitchburg), Brooks House, Hospital Cottages for Children

Elbridge Boyden FAIA (1810–1898) was a prominent 19th-century American architect from Worcester, Massachusetts, who designed numerous civil and public buildings throughout New England and other parts of the United States. Perhaps his best known works are the Taunton State Hospital (1851) and Mechanics Hall (1855) in Worcester.

== Biography ==
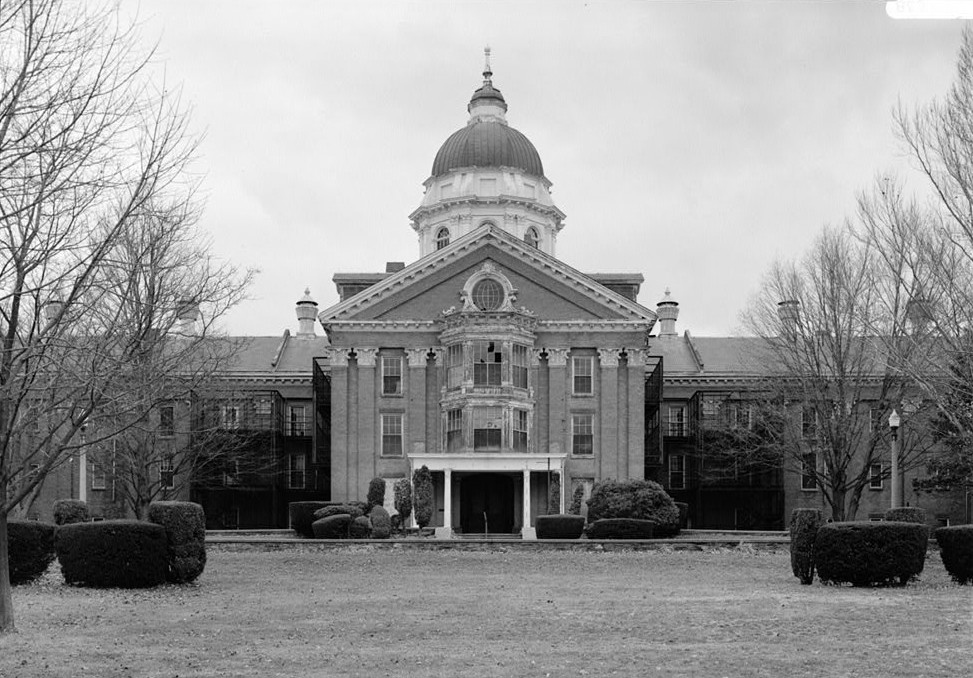
Taunton State Hospital, 1851-2009.

=== Early life ===
Boyden was born in Somerset, Vermont, on July 4, 1810, to Amos Boyden, a Revolutionary War Veteran, and Abigail (Wood) Boyden. The family moved to Orange, Massachusetts, where young Elbridge attended public schools. As a young boy, he left school to work in a sawmill. At age sixteen he went to Athol where he was apprenticed to a carpenter, Joel Stratton. Stratton owned two books by Asher Benjamin, which is where Boyden began his architectural training. In 1830 he began to work for Jonathan Cutting, a builder from Templeton, who had built the First Church in that town. Before long he bought out Cutting's business, and worked as a builder and designer in Athol until 1844.

=== Professional career ===
That year, facing bankruptcy due to business reversals, he moved to Worcester, where he first worked on an addition to the old Worcester State Lunatic Asylum. In 1847 he and Phineas Ball, a civil engineer, decided to take an office together in the old Central Exchange Building on Main Street. At this time he established himself as solely an architect. In 1848 he partnered with Lewis E. Joy, as Boyden & Joy. They split the following year and he formally associated himself with Ball. The pair operated as Boyden & Ball from 1849 to 1860, and dominated the region's architectural practice.

In about 1863 his son, George E. Boyden, joined his firm, then known as E. Boyden & Son. The younger Boyden died in 1885, but the firm's name remained until the elder Boyden's death. In 1892 Boyden was one of the founders of the Worcester Chapter of the American Institute of Architects, and served as its president from then until his death. Boyden was also a member of the Sons of the American Revolution, and served a term as vice-president of the Massachusetts Chapter. He died in Worcester on March 25, 1898. He married Louisa Davis of Royalston, Massachusetts.

== Architectural works ==
=== Elbridge Boyden, 1847-1848 ===
Boyden's earliest works were indicative of his training as a builder in the first half of the nineteenth century. His earliest identified works, three houses from 1847, were all designed in the Greek Revival style, then solidly in the mainstream. All on Harvard Street, only one survives. The largest of the three was the Emory Bannister House. Demolished in 1981, it featured a large, single-story Doric portico. The one that still stands is at 1 Dix Street, moved there from Harvard in 1887 for the Otis Putnam House. The house has lost most of its original detail, but retains a Doric porch. It was built for Charles Oliver.

Other works:

- 1847 - Elbridge Boyden House, 14 Harvard St, Worcester, Massachusetts
  - The architect's own residence. Demolished

=== Boyden & Joy, 1848-1849 ===
Boyden's partner from 1848 to 1849, Lewis E. Joy, is an obscure figure at best. All that is known is that after leaving Boyden, he worked with William Brown, Worcester's first professional architect, then working in Lowell. During this brief period, Boyden made great use of the Rundbogenstil Romanesque style. He was one of the earliest adopters of the style, which had been introduced in New York City in 1846 by Richard Upjohn. The earliest of Boyden's projects in this style was an unidentified block of houses on Harvard Street, in 1848. In the following year, 1849, they did the town hall at Gardner, which also incorporated gothic elements. It has been demolished.

=== Boyden & Ball, 1849-1860 ===
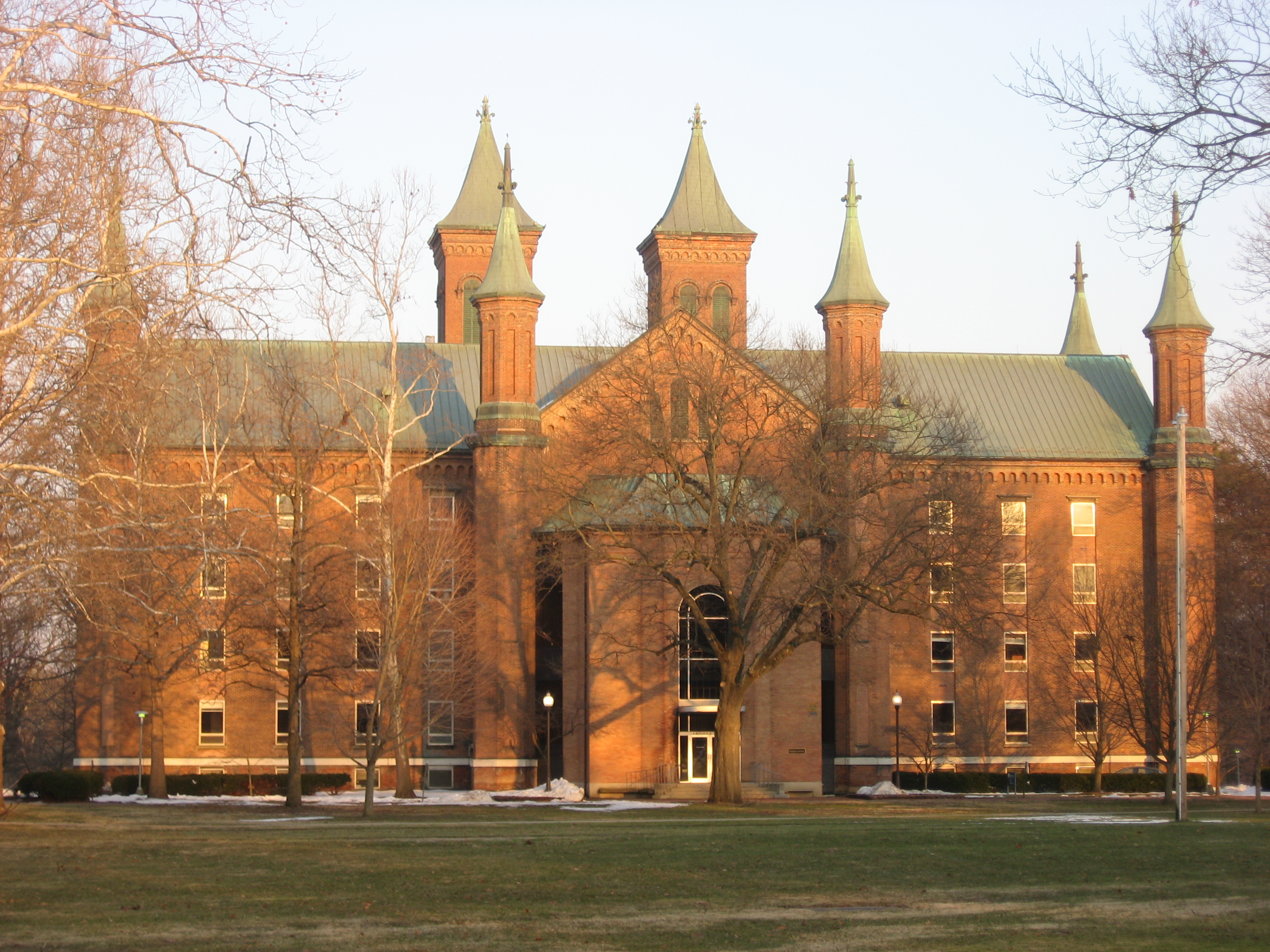
Antioch Hall, Antioch College, Yellow Springs, OH. 1852.

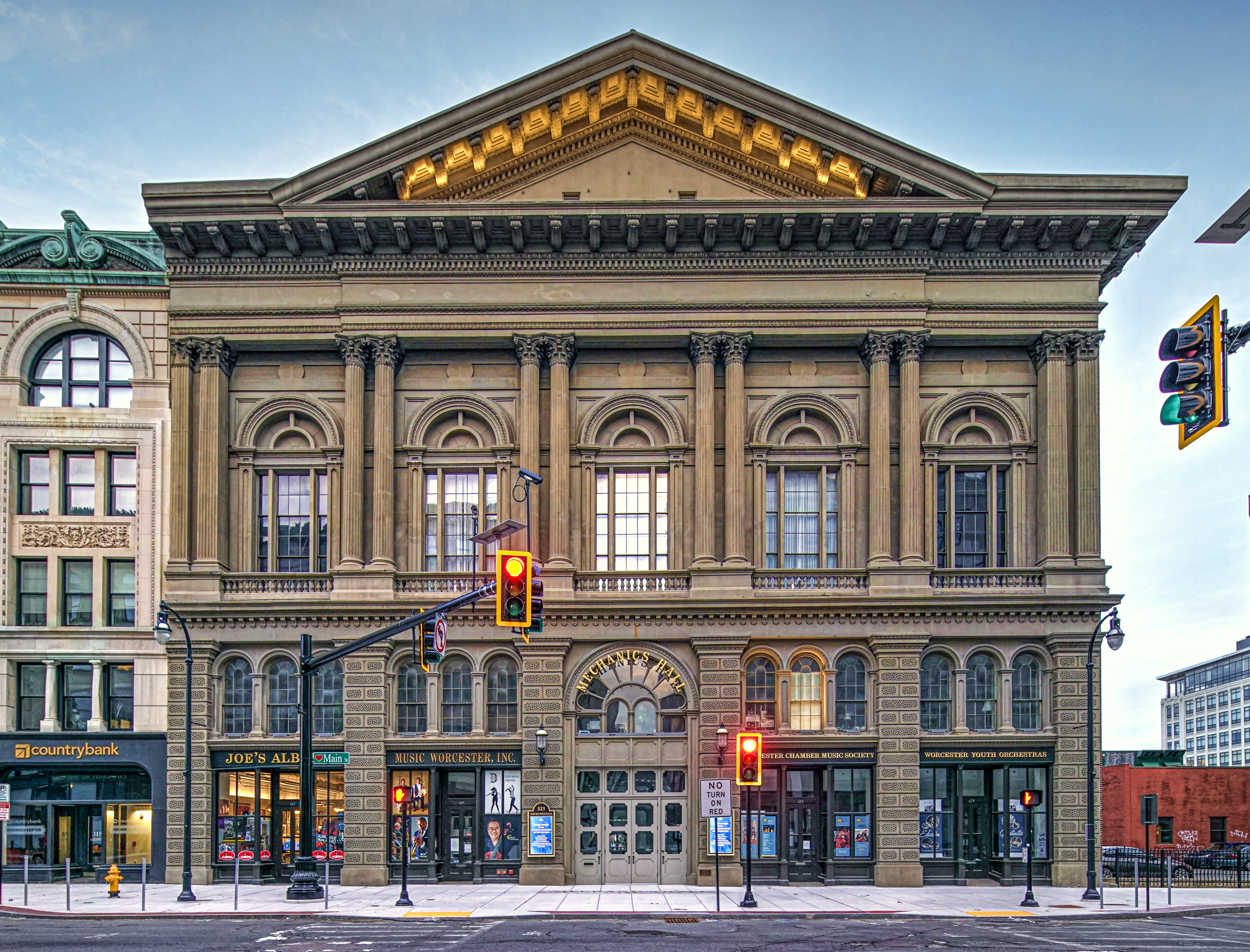
Mechanics Hall, Worcester, MA. 1855-57.

Elbridge Boyden and Phineas Ball had shared an office since 1847, but did not become formally associated until 1849. It was during this period that Boyden rose to regional prominence, designing buildings all across the state of Massachusetts, in addition to works elsewhere in the northeast.

This was begun in 1851 with the Taunton State Hospital, a sprawling institutional complex. This was Boyden's first design to feature monumental classicism, in the Italianate style. The original campus was completed in 1854, and closed in 1975. The dome collapsed in 1999, and the remainder of the original complex was demolished in 2005. Boyden's success at Taunton was followed up by two major academic commissions. Both in 1852, Boyden designed the original campus of Antioch College in Yellow Springs, Ohio, and the Worcester Medical College. Both were symmetrical and monumental Romanesque buildings, modeled on the Smithsonian Institution Building in Washington. Antioch's three original buildings still stand, but Worcester Medical was demolished in 1965. Prior to its demolition, it had served as the main building of Worcester Academy from 1869.

Boyden also worked on at least three churches during this time. The first of these (1856), the Congregational Church at Brookfield, hangs on to the Romanesque, and has much in common with the slightly later work of John Stevens of Boston. He was also commissioned to build the 1858 Town House, which was originally the 1858 Townhouse, in Sherborn, Massachusetts, with a bequest from Thomas Dowse's will. It is now listed on the National Register of Historic Places. In 1859 Boyden remodeled the Baptist Church at Athol, designing a new facade and tower for the church. The tower was destroyed in 1938. Also in 1859 they remodeled the First Congregational Church in Keene, New Hampshire. Like much of Boyden's work at the time, it featured a monumental Italianate facade. This would be only the first of Boyden's many works in Keene.

Also during this time, Boyden & Ball designed many commercial buildings in Worcester. Of these, the first significant one was Horticultural Hall at 18 Front Street. It was an unusual use of the Romanesque in a commercial setting. The building's fate is not precisely known, and may have been incorporated into the current building on the site. Next came the Clark Block in 1854, at 401-409 Main Street. An impressive structure in its day, half of its Italianate facade has been replaced, and the other half is highly deteriorated. In 1855 came Mechanics Hall, perhaps Boyden's best-known work. Here, Boyden's classical work dwarfed its neighbors, both then and now. It was a popular place for meetings and performances, and remains so today. In 1857 Boyden & Ball designed the Front Street Theatre, adjacent to Horticultural Hall. It was the first venue in Worcester designed specifically for theatre productions. It was destroyed by fire in 1898.

Boyden & Ball also did a few more works further afield, including Denny Hall, Spencer's first high school in 1857, Larchmont, the country home of Ransom C. Taylor, and the Town House at Sherborn, both in 1858.

Other works include:

- 1850 - Ash Street School, 4 Ash St, Worcester, Massachusetts
- 1850 - Harrington Corner, 427 Main St, Worcester, Massachusetts
  - Remodeled in 1972
- 1854 - Lincoln House Block, 370 Main St, Worcester, Massachusetts
- 1855 - George Hobbs House, 12 State St, Worcester, Massachusetts
  - Demolished
- 1858 - 1858 Town House, 3 Sanger Street, P.O. Box 2, Sherborn, Massachusetts
- 1859 - Tatnuck School, 1067 Pleasant St, Worcester, Massachusetts
  - Demolished

=== Elbridge Boyden, 1860-1863 ===
For a brief period in the early 1860s Boyden was the sole principal in his office. During this period he retained the Italianate style that he had been working with since the early 1850s. The largest project of this time was the 1862-built Damon Mill at Concord. It is an uncommon example of an industrial structure receiving a full architectural treatment. He also designed, in 1863, the First Congregational Church at Spencer, which was similar in its elaborate design to the First Congregational Church in Keene, built four years earlier. The Spencer church was destroyed by fire, believed to have been started by a lightning strike, in June of 2023. Other works include:

- 1860 - House for Samuel Dinsmoor Jr., Main St, Keene, New Hampshire

=== E. Boyden & Son, 1863-1898 ===
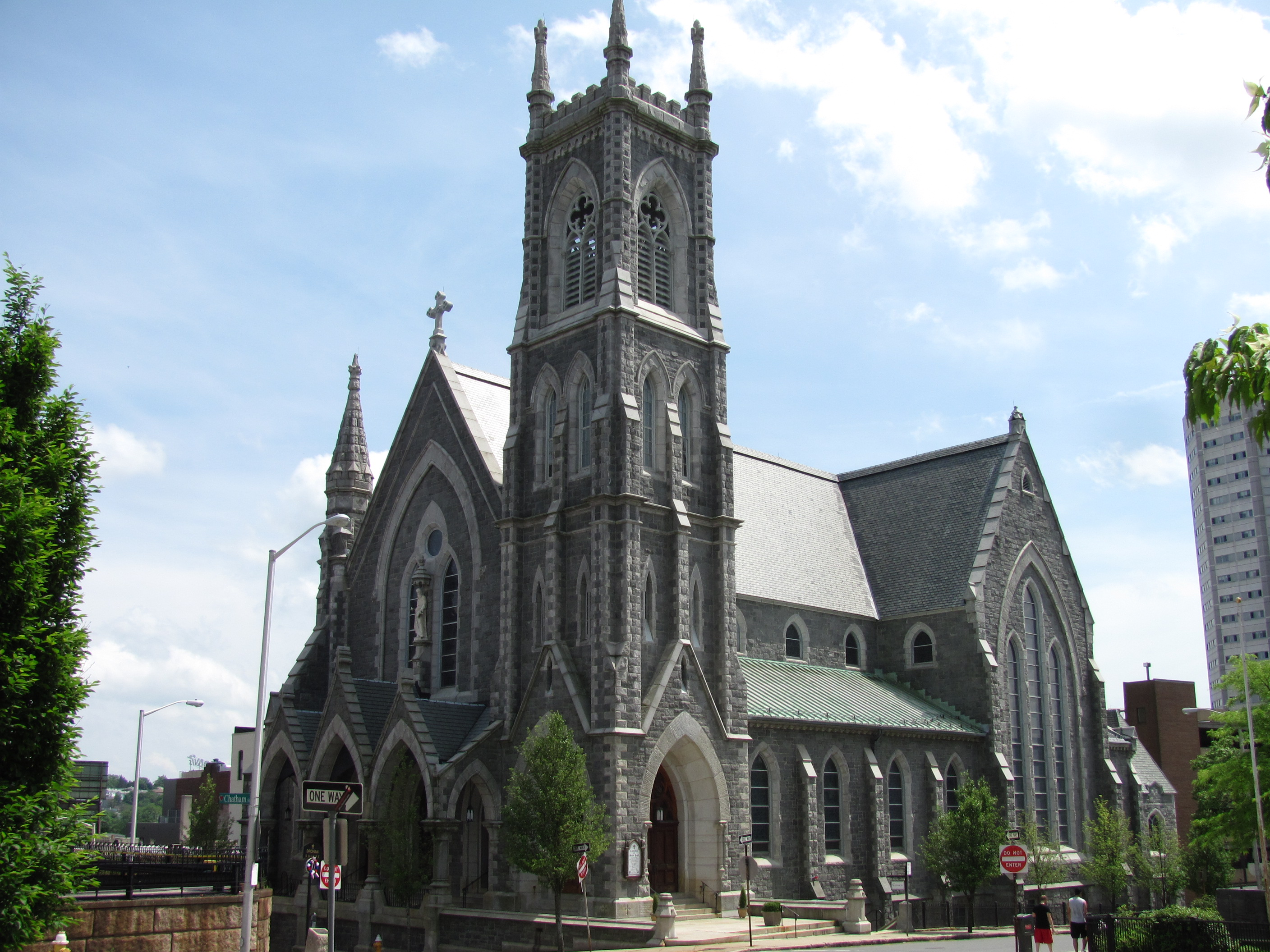
St. Paul's Church, Worcester, 1868.

Circa 1863 Boyden's son, George E. Boyden, became a partner in the office, which became E. Boyden & Son. Though the younger Boyden died in 1885, the firm remained E. Boyden & Son until Elbridge Boyden's death, making it the longest-lasting period in the firm's history.

Boyden and his son designed many churches, mainly in the High Victorian Gothic style. The first of these was St. Paul's Church, presently the Cathedral of St. Paul, in Worcester. It is a mostly monochromatic building, but maintains the "stripy bacon" aspect so criticized in such buildings. It was begun in 1868 and completed in 1874. Next was the First M. E. Church in Saratoga Springs, New York, now known as the Universal Preservation Hall. It is considered to be one of the finest High Victorian Gothic buildings in the region. In 1873 Boyden made his first foray into Rhode Island, designing L'Eglise du Precieux Sang in Woonsocket, an American center of French Canadian culture. The church's tower was significantly rebuilt in the early 20th century. In 1874 they designed All Souls Church in Brattleboro, Vermont. This church was the firm's first use of this unique tower, which would be repeated on other churches, including the Congregational Church at Gilbertville (1874) and the Channing Memorial Church at Newport, Rhode Island (1880). Several years later in 1888 he designed St. Paul's in Rutland, Vermont, which attempts to unite the High Victorian Gothic and Queen Anne styles.

The firm's next most common type of commission was for academic buildings. In 1867 they competed for the design of Boynton Hall on the campus of the Worcester Polytechnic Institute, but lost to Earle & Fuller. Boyden had to settle for the schools second building, Washburn Shops. Built in 1868, this was a long, brick building with a tall mansard roof. They designed two public schools for the city, the Cambridge Street and Grafton Street Schools, in 1869 and 1879, respectively. Cambridge Street was solidly Second Empire, but Grafton Street showed a move towards the Queen Anne of the 1880s. In 1869 he designed the former Fitchburg High School on Academy Street in Fitchburg, which had much in common with the contemporary Cambridge Street School. Henry M. Francis may have been involved in the design. Boyden's final academic works were two buildings on the campus of Nichols Academy in Dudley. These were Academy Hall, an academic building, and Conant Hall, a dormitory, in 1880 and 1885. Both were solidly in the Queen Anne mainstream. Both have been altered, Academy Hall beyond recognition.

They also designed a number of public buildings, including several town halls. First was the one in North Brookfield, in 1864. This was one of Boyden's last fully Italianate commissions. By the time Boyden & Son were commissioned to design the Town Hall in Orange in 1868, they had switched over to the Mansard Second Empire. This building was totally rebuilt in 1912, to designs by H. M. Francis & Sons of Fitchburg. They also designed two Queen Anne town halls. The Upton Town Hall, still standing, was built in 1883. In 1884 they designed the town hall for Sutton, since demolished. In 1870 they designed a secondary Worcester County courthouse in Fitchburg. Like several of Boyden's public-oriented commissions of the 1860s and 70s, it was a monochromatic High Victorian Gothic building. It is now vacant. His last major public commission came in 1889, when he designed the Hospital Cottages for Children at Baldwinville. Like his much earlier Taunton State Hospital, it was a sprawling medical campus, though now Queen Anne, not Italianate. The complex has been demolished.

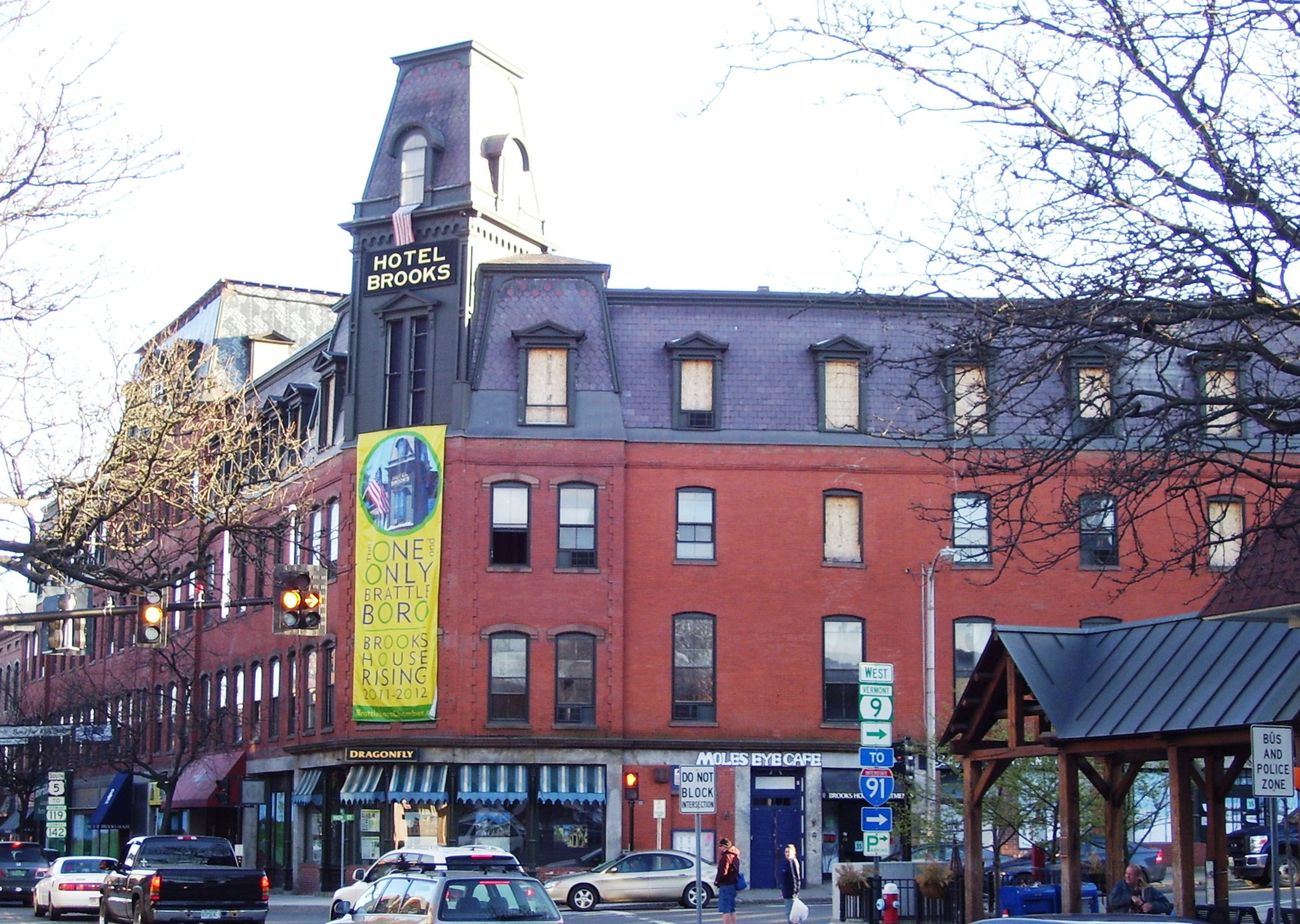
Brooks House, Brattleboro, 1871.

During this period Boyden designed many hotels, all in the Second Empire style. First, in 1868, came two in upstate New York. He built the massive Congress Hall in downtown Saratoga Springs, and rebuilt the much older Fort William Henry Hotel in Lake George. Both built of wood, they were destroyed by fire at different times. In addition to these tourist hotels, he also built a series of commercial hotels across New England. In 1870 he designed the Towns Hotel in Bellows Falls, Vermont, which burned. His last two hotels, however, still stand. In 1871 he designed the Brooks House in Brattleboro, one of the largest in northern New England. The other was the Crocker House at New London, Connecticut in 1872.

Boyden's first commercial work with this partnership was a duo of office buildings in Keene, New Hampshire. These were the Bank Block and Colony's Block, both on Central Square. Designed to look like a single structure, this was ruined when the Bank Block was heavily remodeled. Regardless, the Colony brothers' building remains in near-original condition. In 1871 Boyden & Son designed the Savings Bank Block on Main Street in Fitchburg. This flamboyant Second Empire structure has been demolished. A decade later, they designed the Bank Block on High Street in Clinton, a polychromatic Queen Anne office building. In 1888 he designed the Lamb Block at 41 Pleasant Street in Worcester, one of Boyden's only works in the Neo-Grec style.

As before, Boyden did few residential buildings. During this period, though, he did at least two of note in Worcester. First, in 1867, was the Jerome Marble House on Harvard Street. This is considered to be one of the finest Second Empire buildings still standing in the city. Much later, in 1894, Boyden built an apartment block at Eden and George Streets for Pellett Brothers. This was, in addition to being one of his last overall works, was his only design within the late-19th century Romanesque Revival mainstream. Boyden may have also designed the Henry Colony residence (now the public library) in Keene, New Hampshire, who built Colony's Block the following year. The Colony residence is similar to much of Boyden's other Second Empire work.

Other works include:

- 1863 - East Worcester Street School, 10 E Worcester St, Worcester, Massachusetts
- 1867 - First Baptist Church, 190 Main St, Brattleboro, Vermont
- 1868 - Fenwick Hall (Remodeling), College of the Holy Cross, Worcester, Massachusetts
- 1870 - First Congregational Church, 199 Valley St, Willimantic, Connecticut
- 1870 - Henry Goddard House, 12 Catharine St, Worcester, Massachusetts
  - Demolished in 1979
- 1874 - Hubbardston Public Library, 7 Main St, Hubbardston, Massachusetts
- 1875 – Sylvester K. Pierce House, 4 W Broadway, Gardner, Massachusetts
- 1883 - Rollstone Street School, 260 Rollstone St, Fitchburg, Massachusetts
  - Demolished December 2016
- 1893 - Webster Street Firehouse, 40 Webster St, Worcester, Massachusetts
- 1894 - Jesus-Marie Convent and Academy, 61 Park Ave, Woonsocket, Rhode Island

E. Boyden & Son also competed for the designs of the New York (1867) and Georgia (1883) state capitols, and the Worcester City Hall (1895), but did not win.

== Legacy ==
In 1991, the Elbridge Boyden Society was established at Nichols College in Dudley, Massachusetts.

== Architects associated with Boyden ==
- Phineas Ball, Boyden's partner from 1849 to 1860.
- Albert A. Barker, draftsman for Boyden until 1879.
- George E. Boyden, Boyden's son, and business partner from 1863 until his 1885 death.
- Patrick W. Ford, worked for Boyden from 1866 to 1872.
- John E. Holman, draftsman for Boyden until c.1876.
- Lewis E. Joy, Boyden's partner in 1848 and 1849.

== Gallery ==
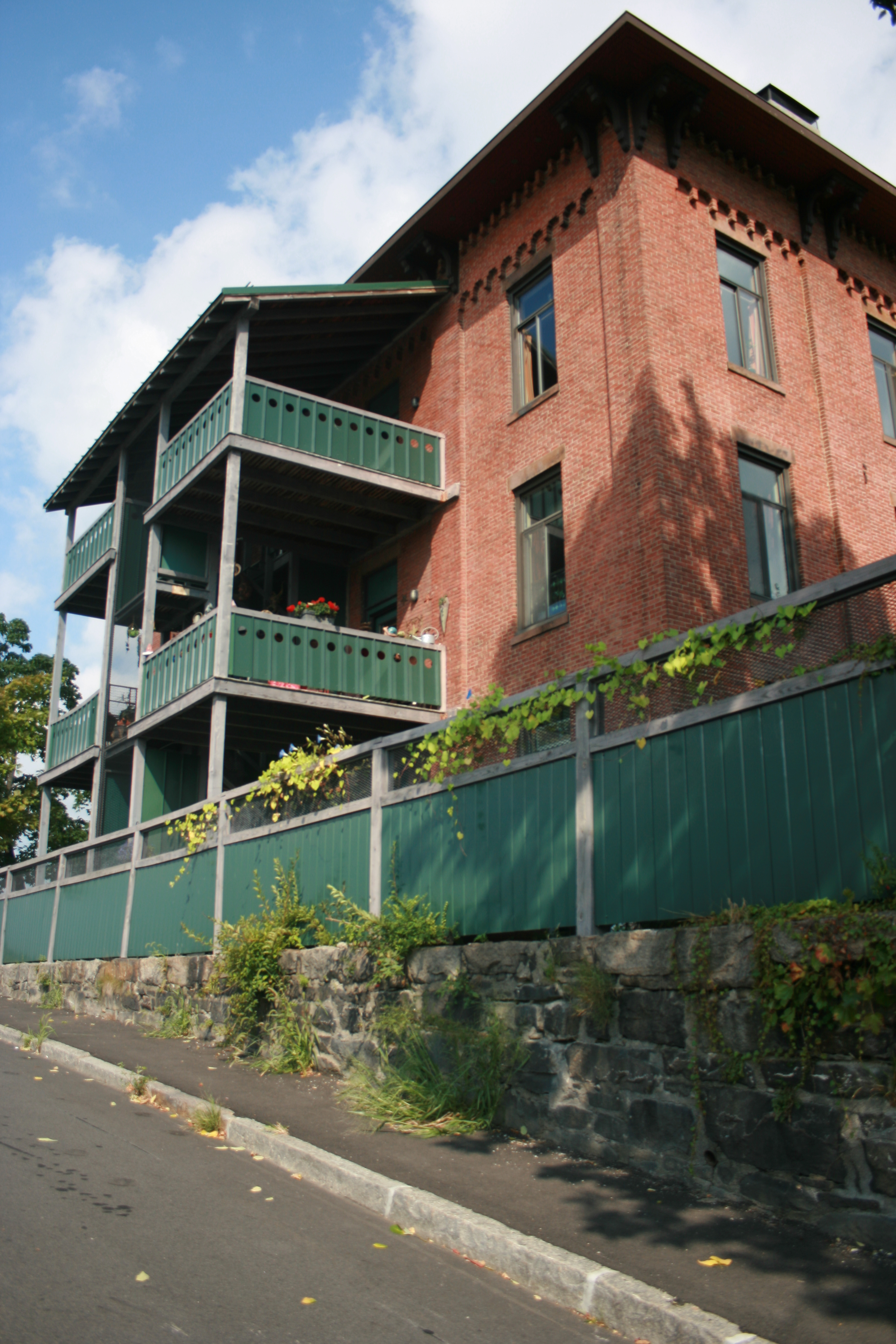
Ash Street School, Worcester, 1850.

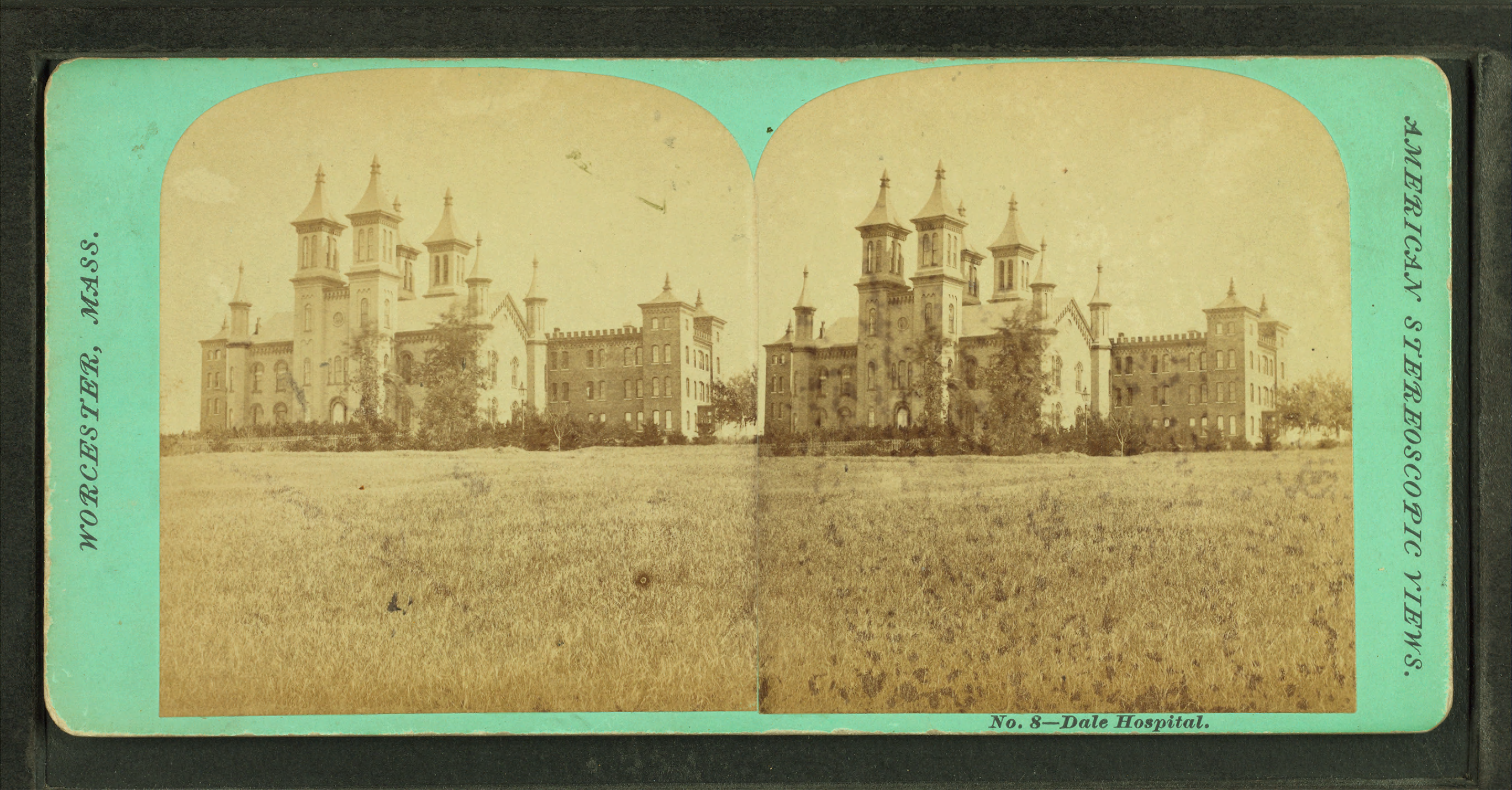
Worcester Medical College, Worcester, 1852. Demolished.

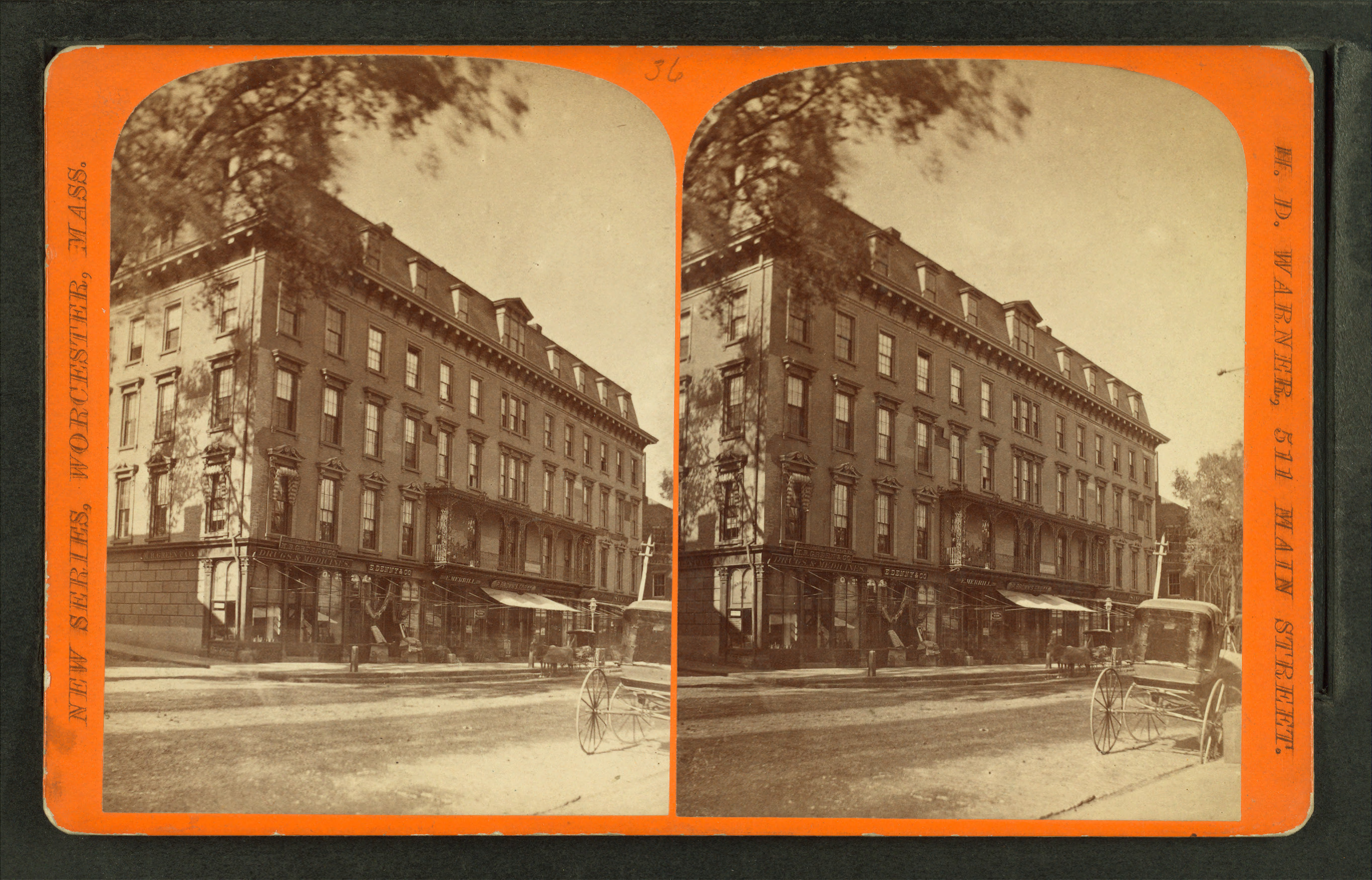
Lincoln House Block, Worcester, 1854. Demolished.

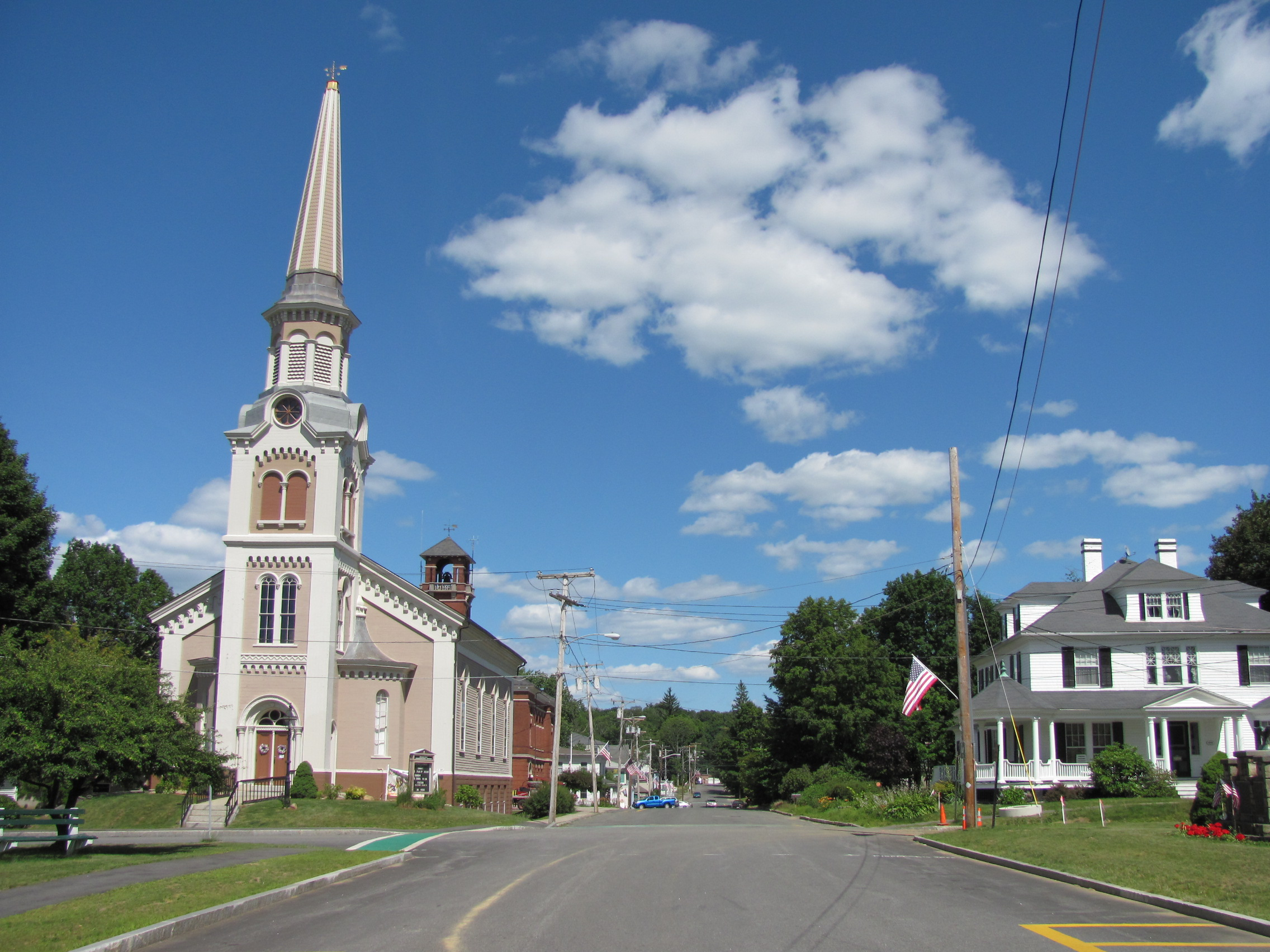
Congregational Church, Brookfield, 1856.

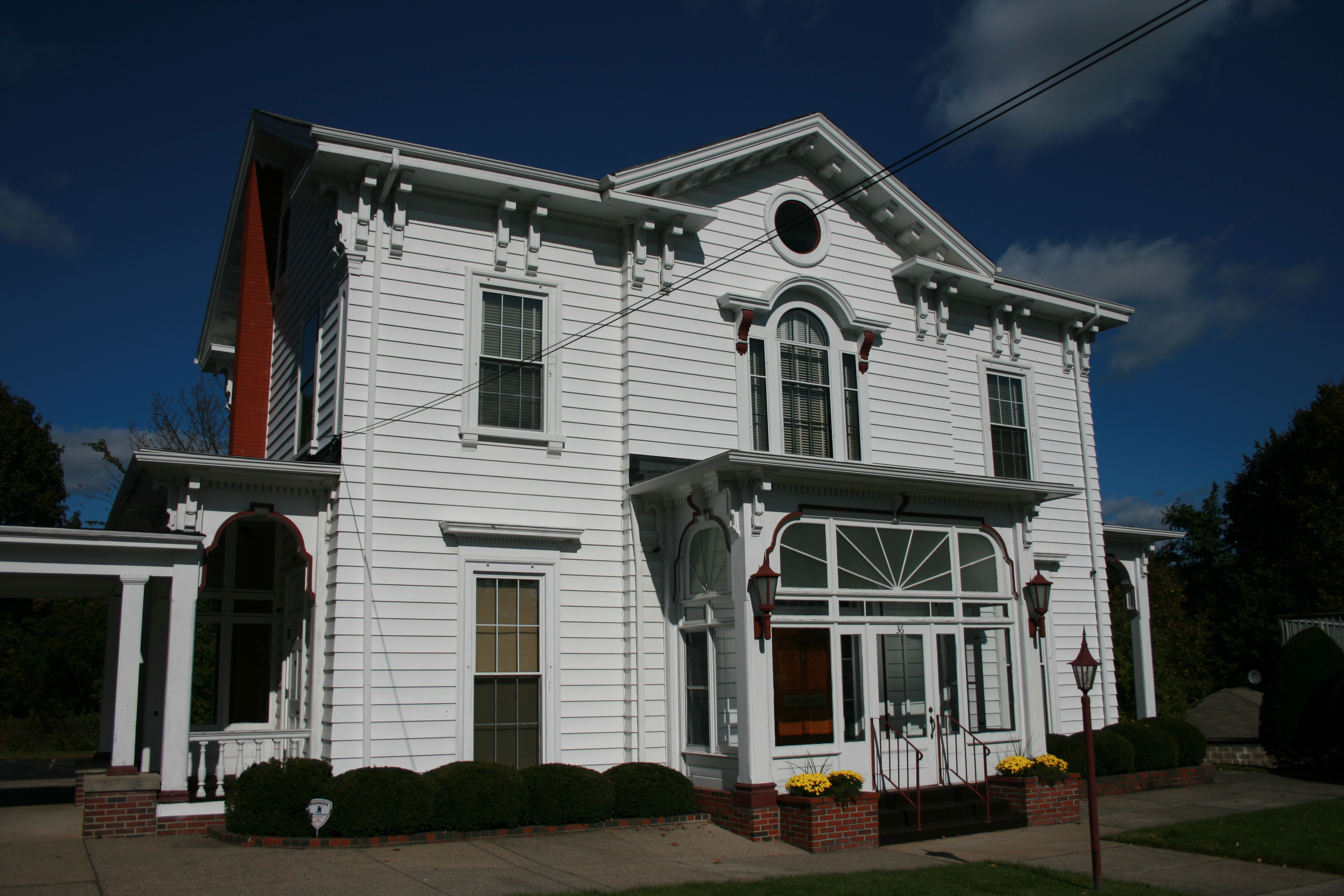
Larchmont, Worcester, 1858.

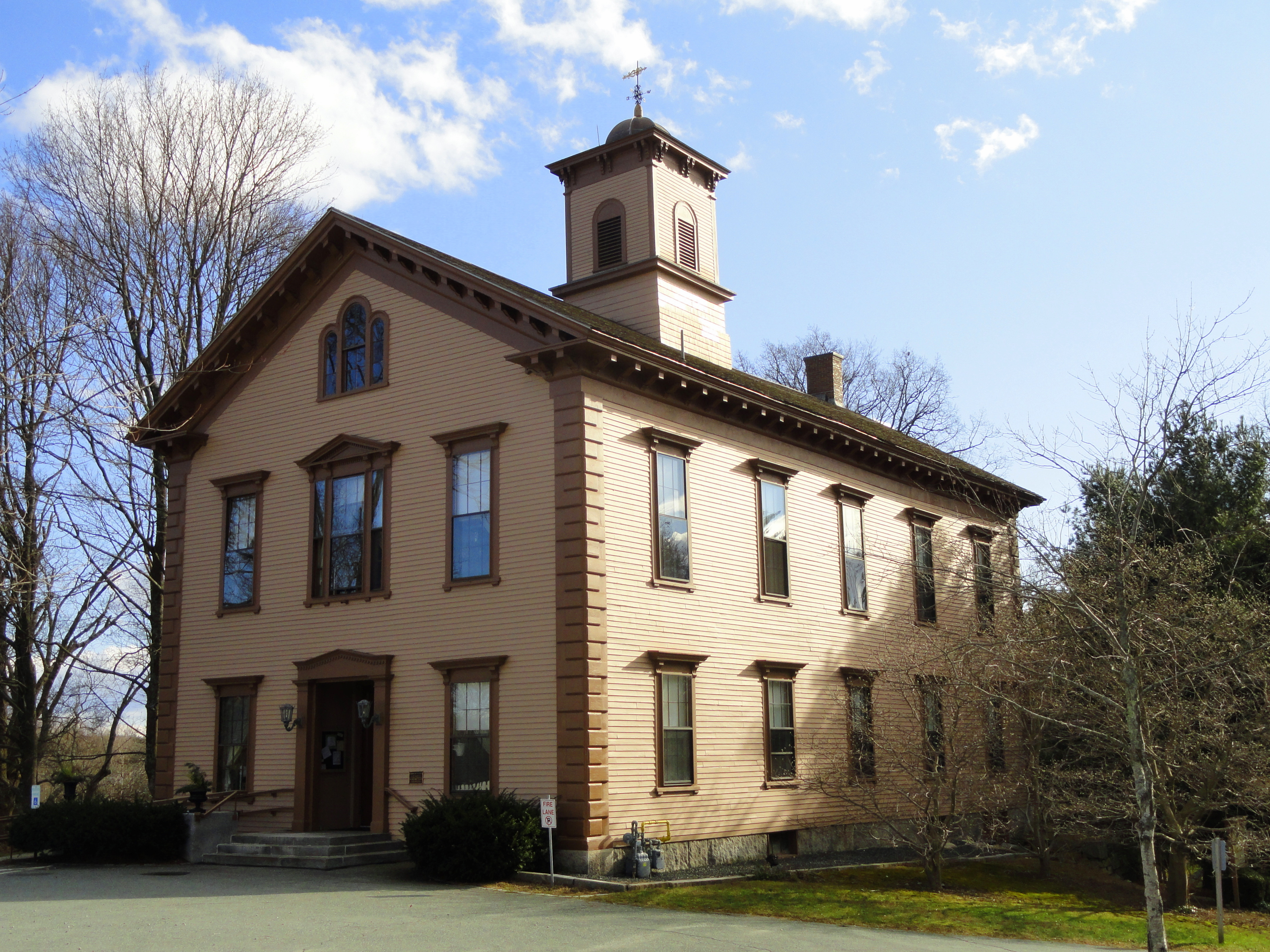
Sherborn 1858 Town House, Sherborn, 1858.

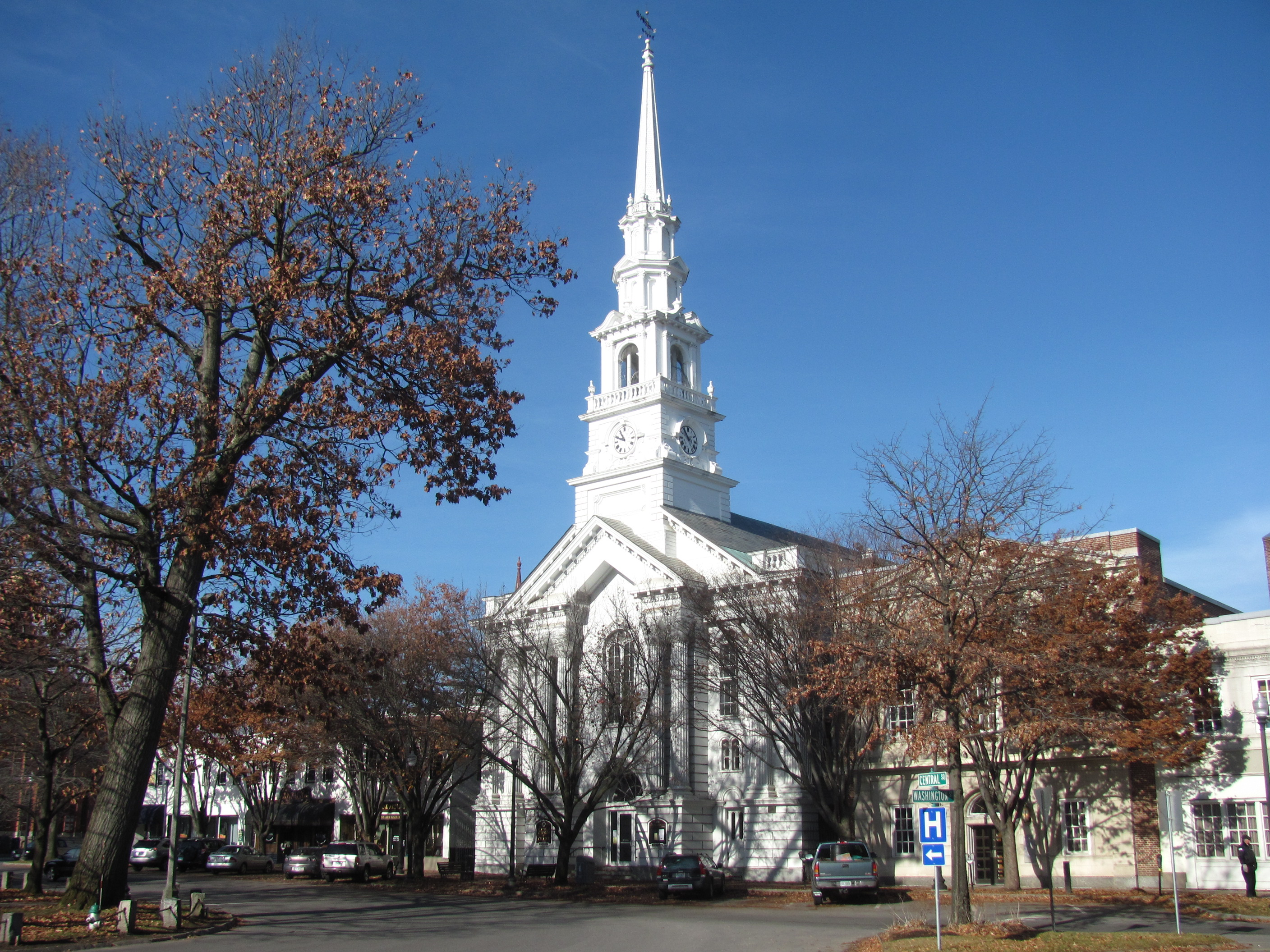
First Congregational Church, Keene, 1859.

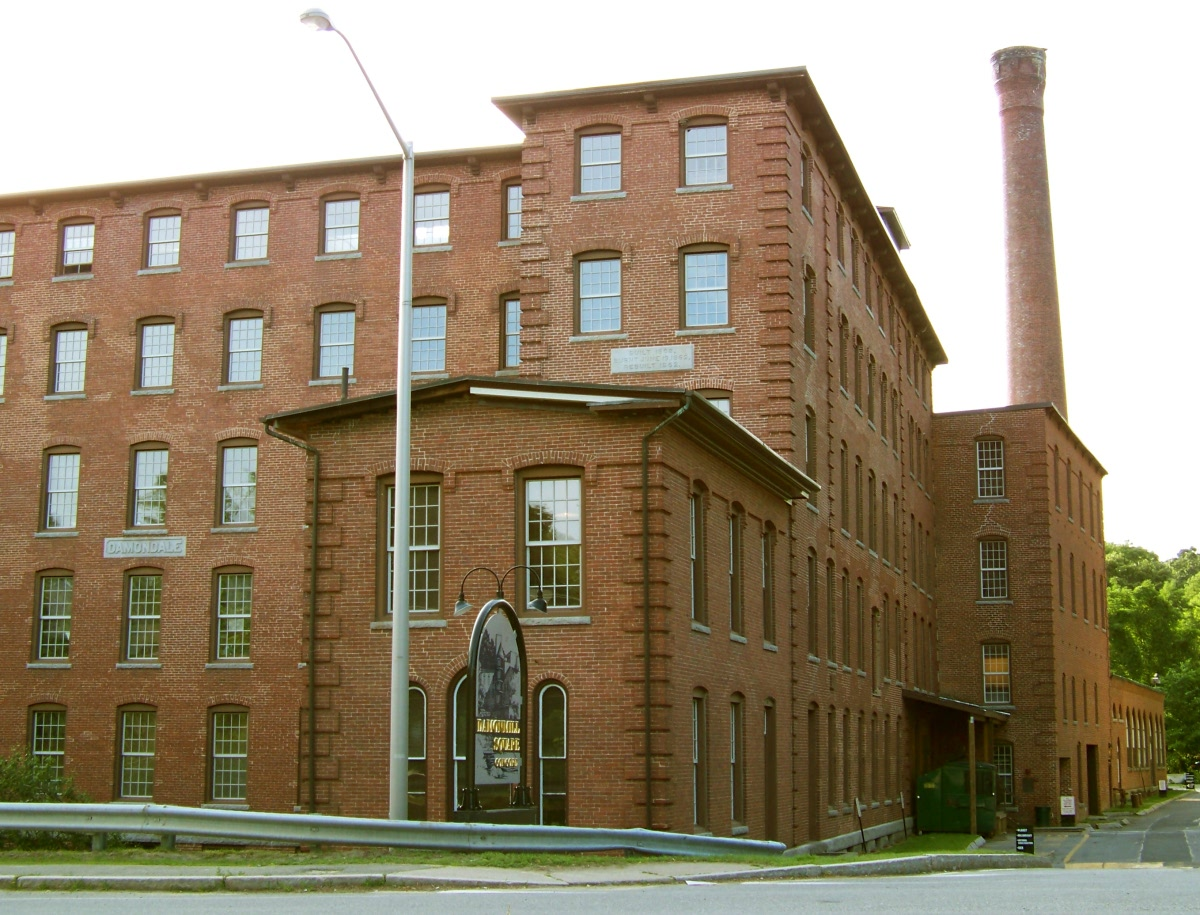
Damon Mill, Concord, 1862.

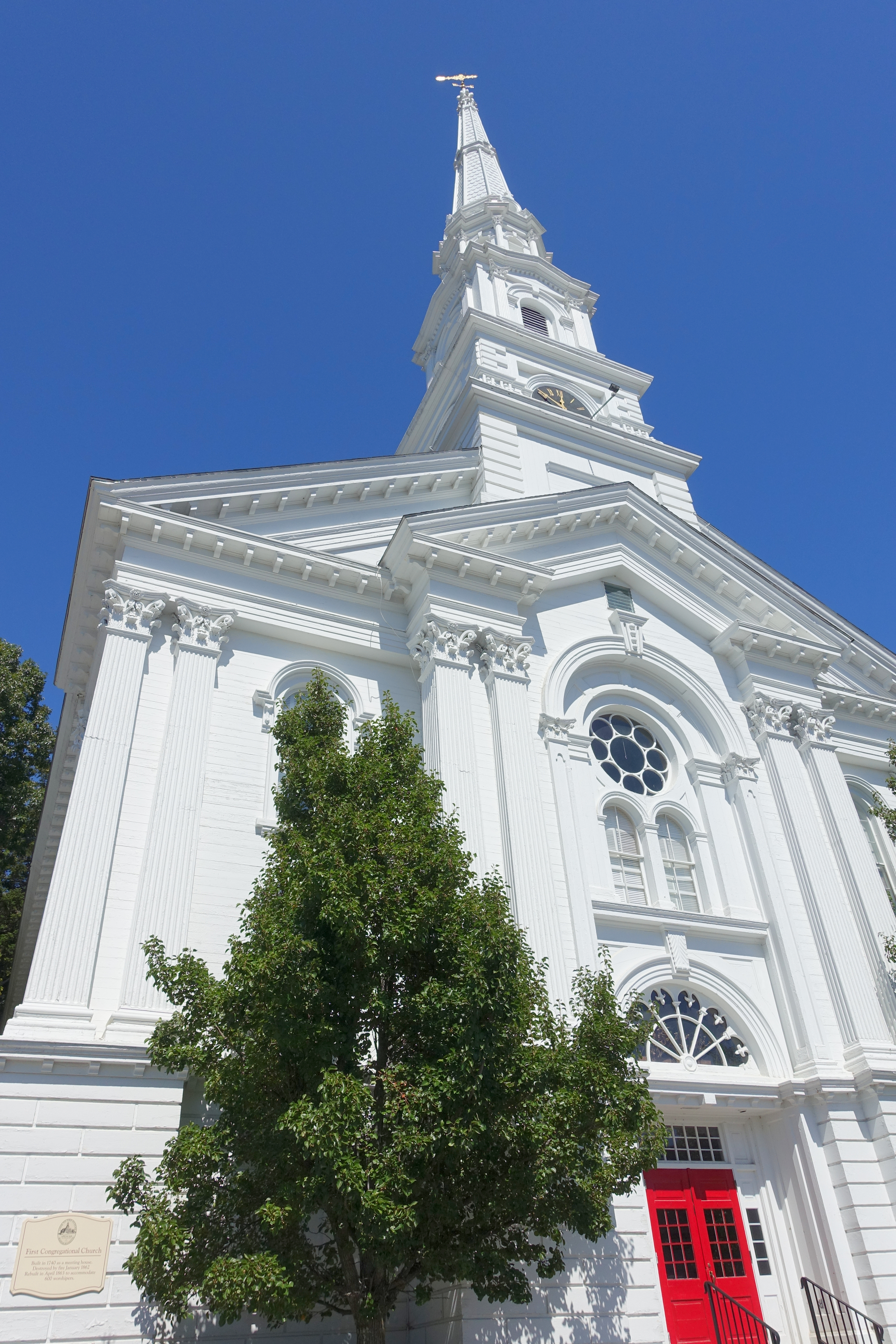
First Congregational Church, Spencer, 1863.

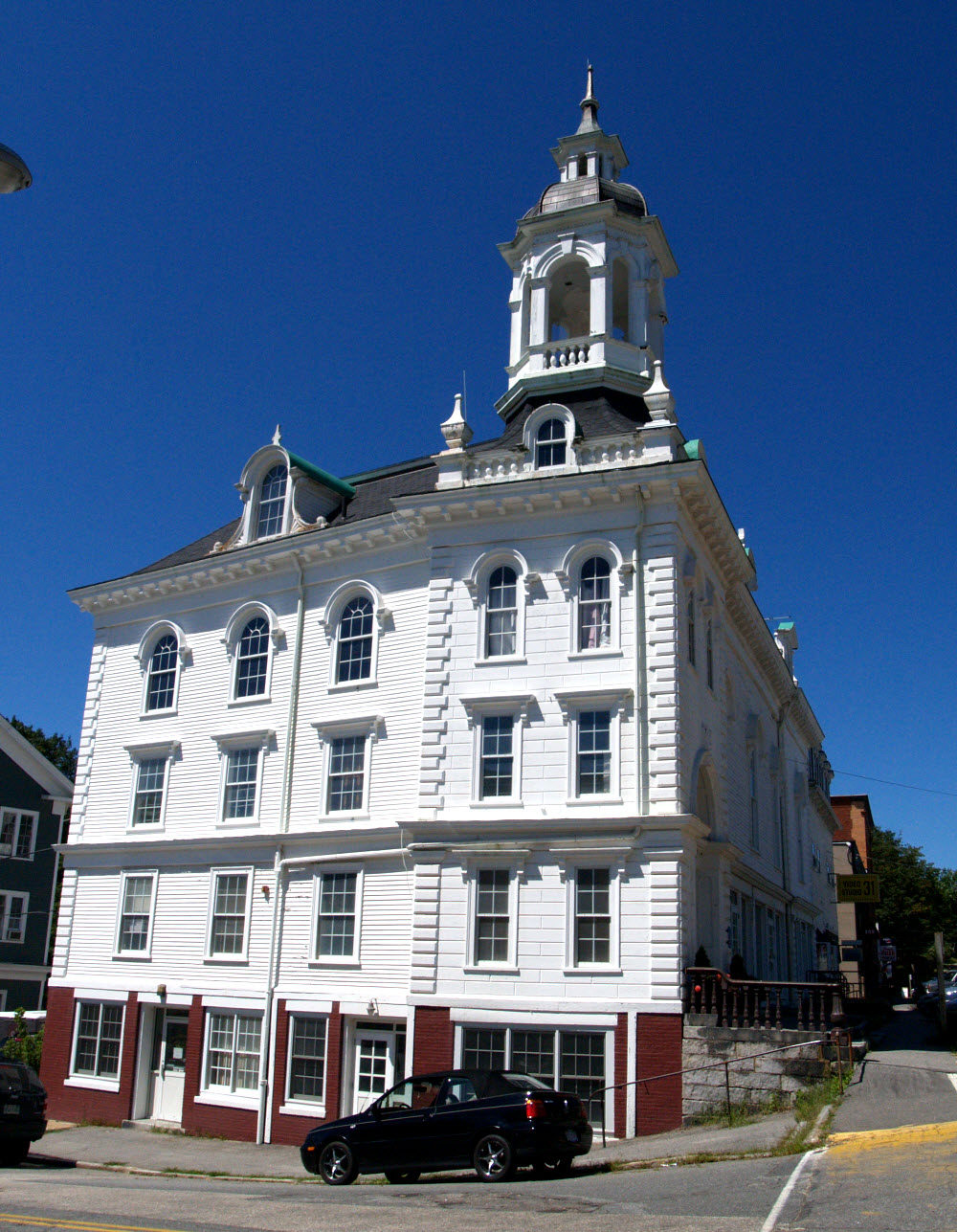
Town House, North Brookfield, 1864.

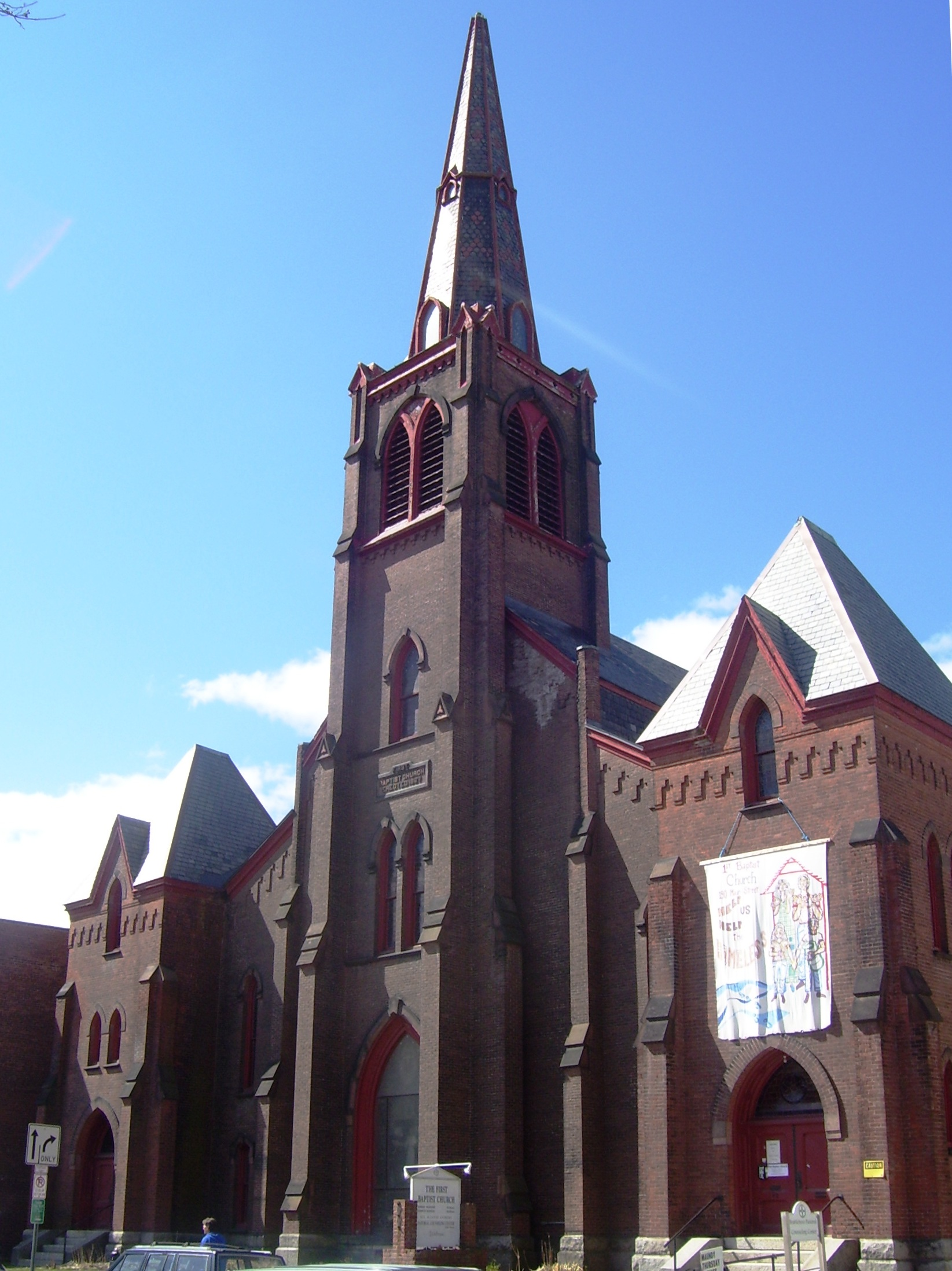
Baptist Church, Brattleboro, 1867.

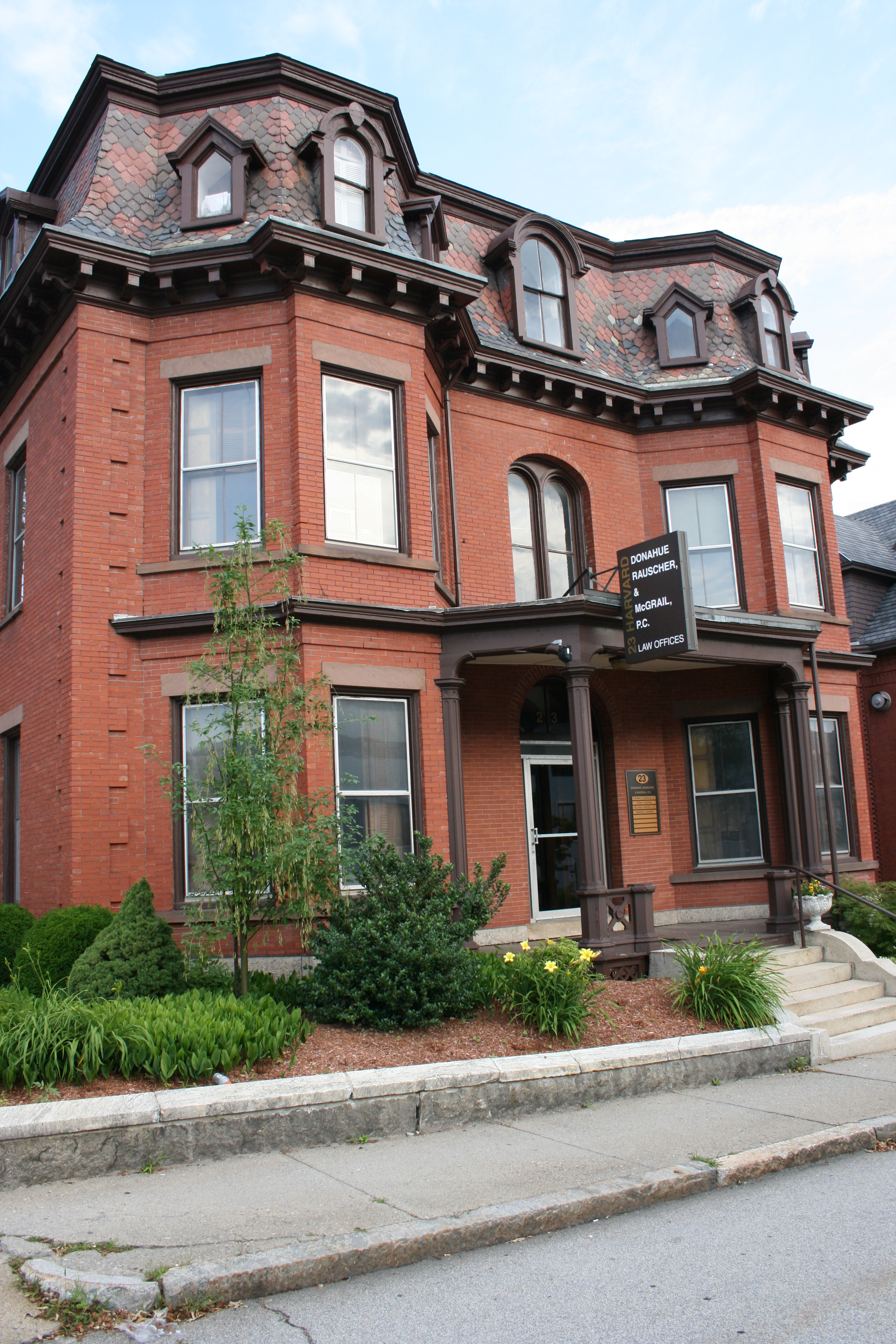
Jerome Marble House, Worcester, 1867.

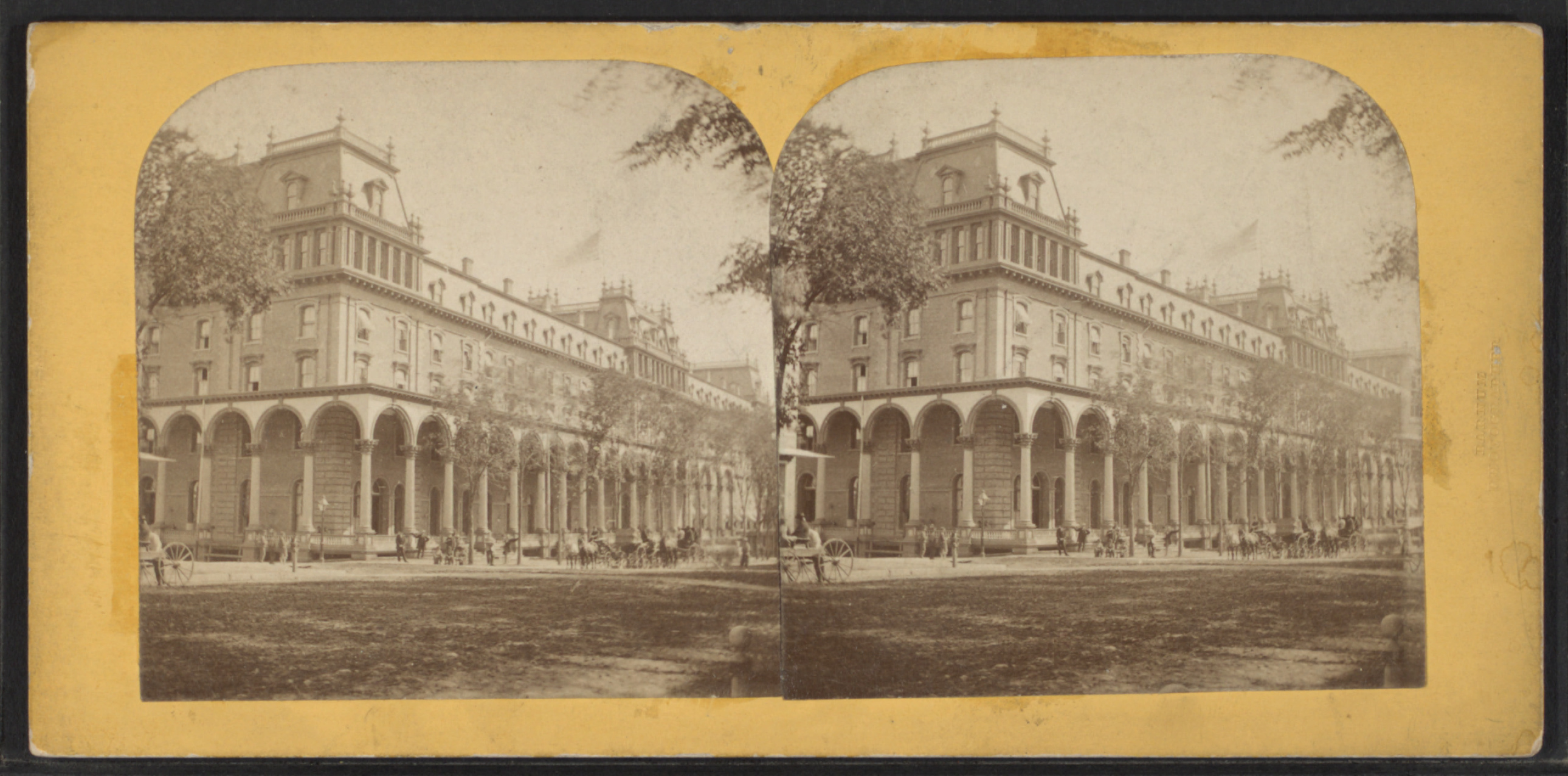
Congress Hall, Saratoga Springs, 1868. Burned.

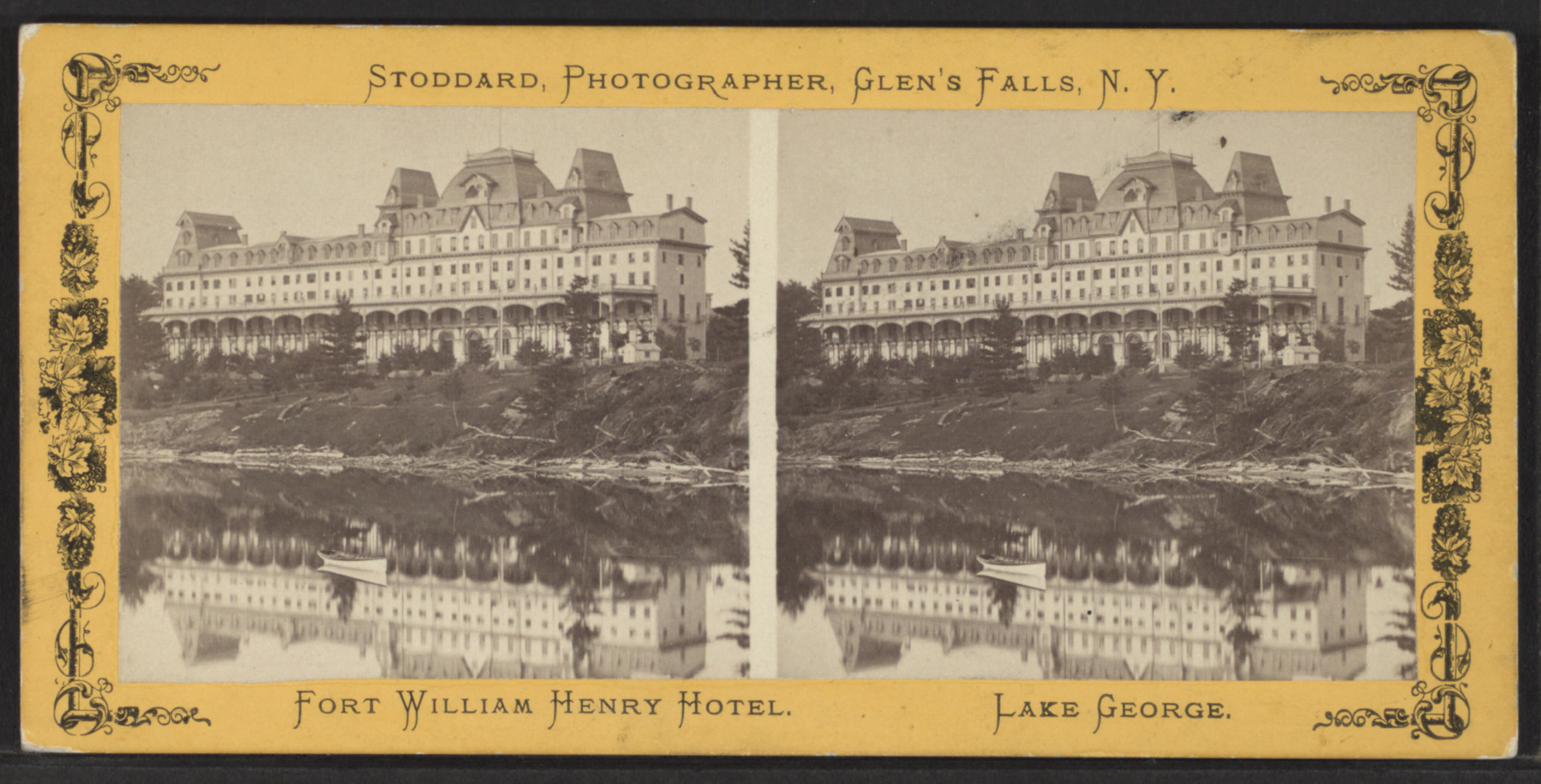
Fort William Henry Hotel, Lake George, 1868. Burned.

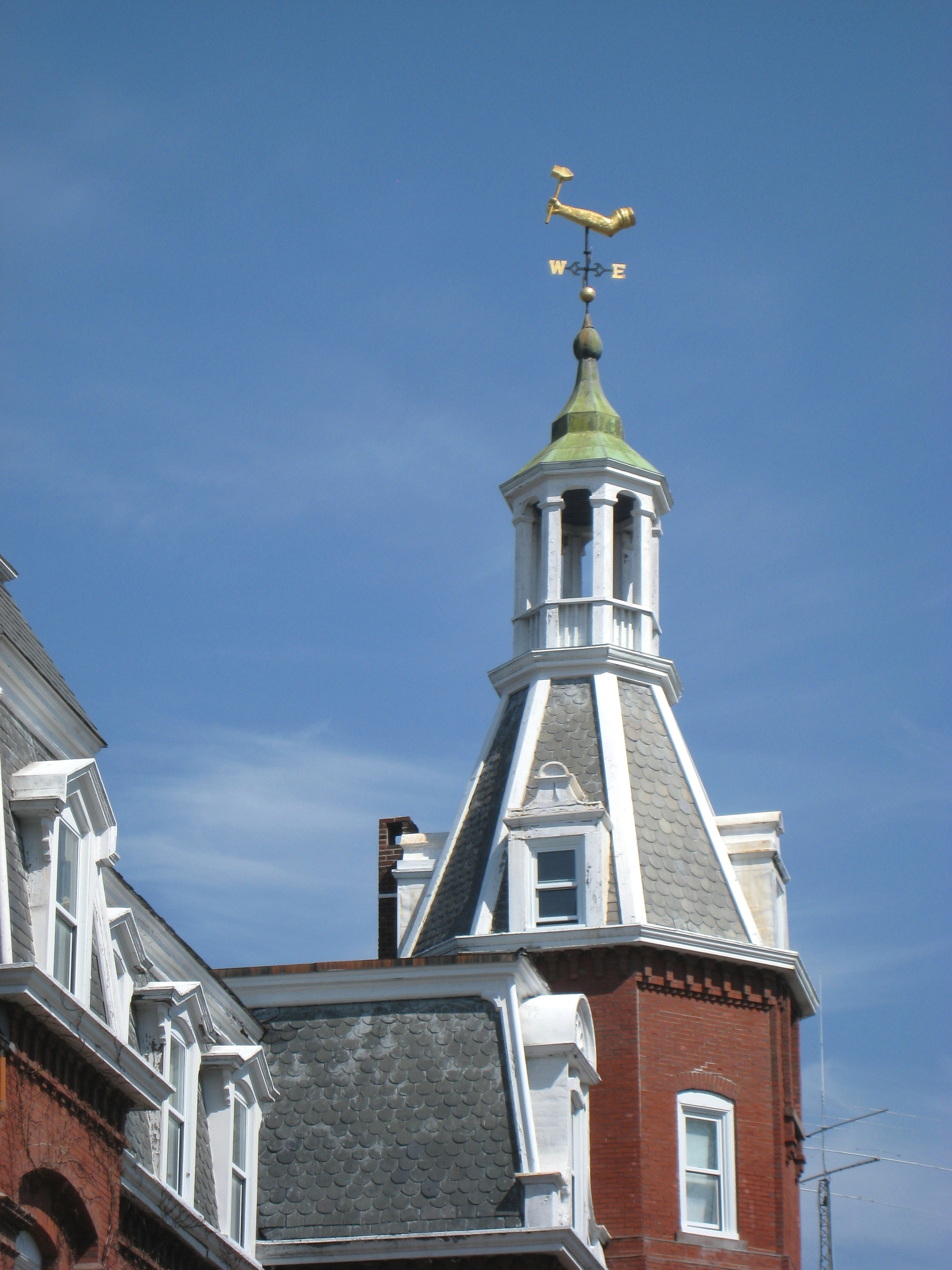
Washburn Shops, Worcester Polytechnic Institute, 1868.

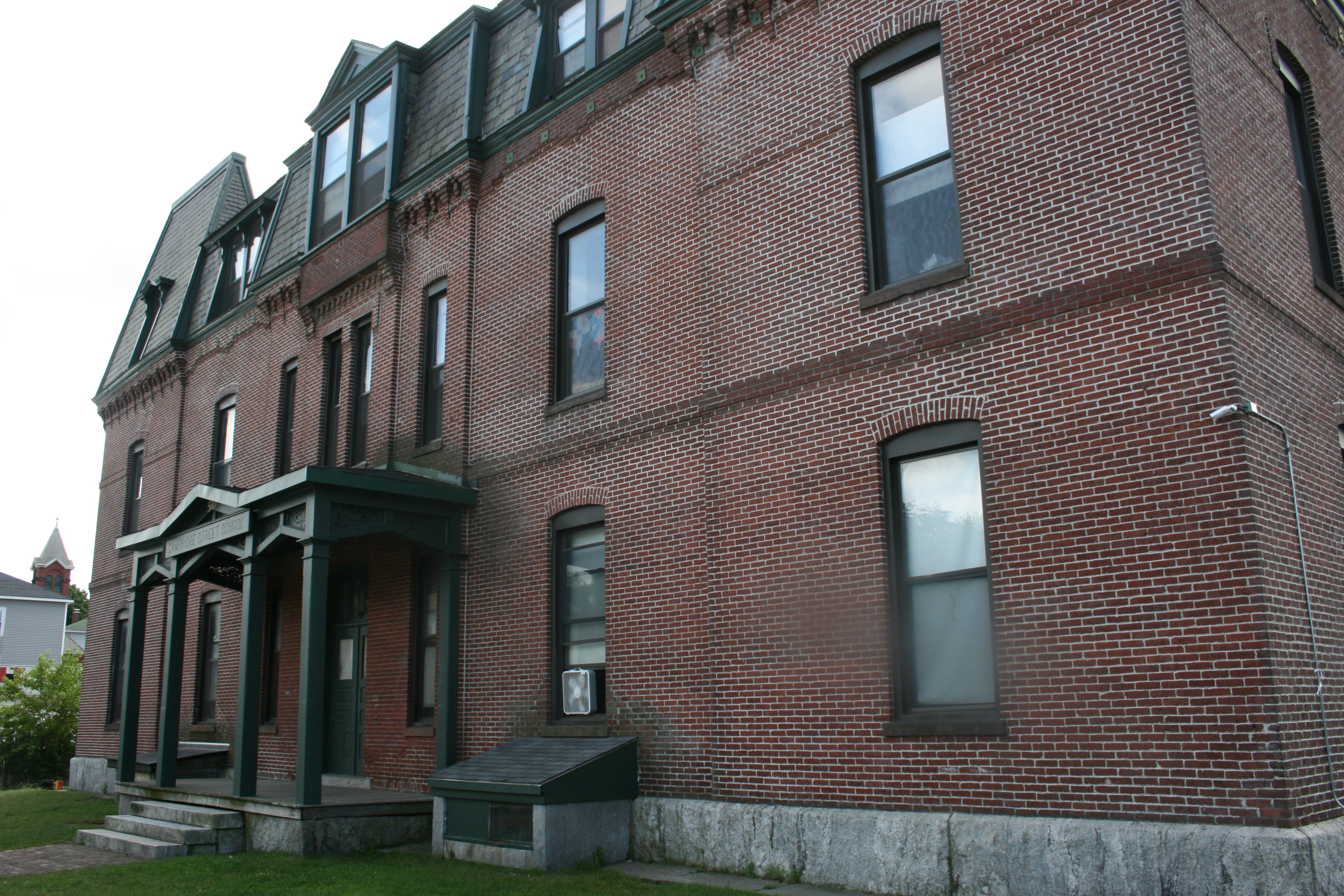
Cambridge Street School, Worcester, 1869.

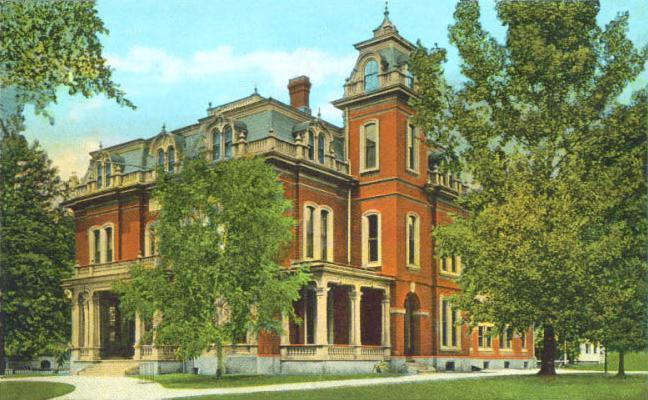
Henry Colony House, Keene, 1869.

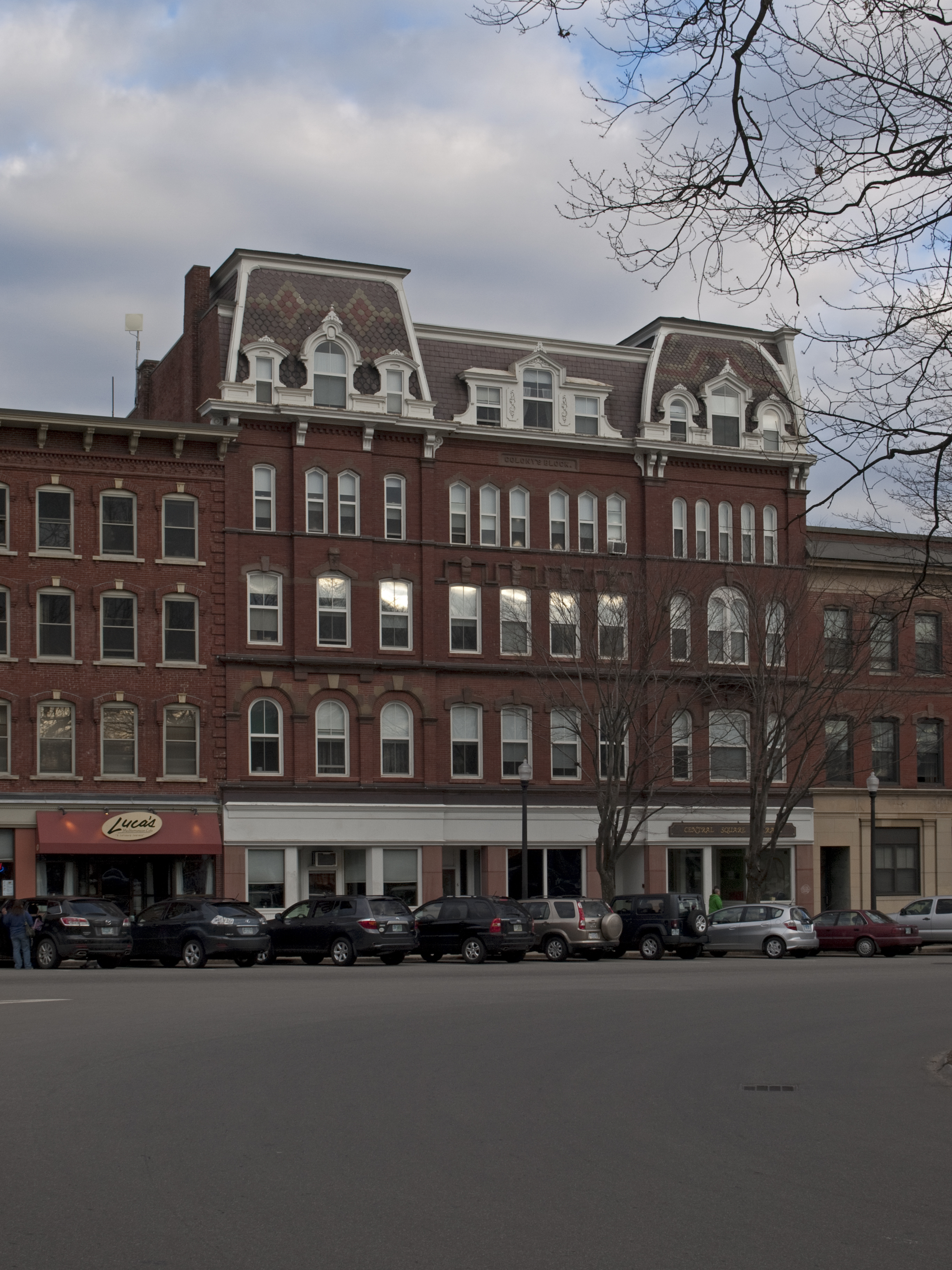
Colony's Block, Keene, 1870.

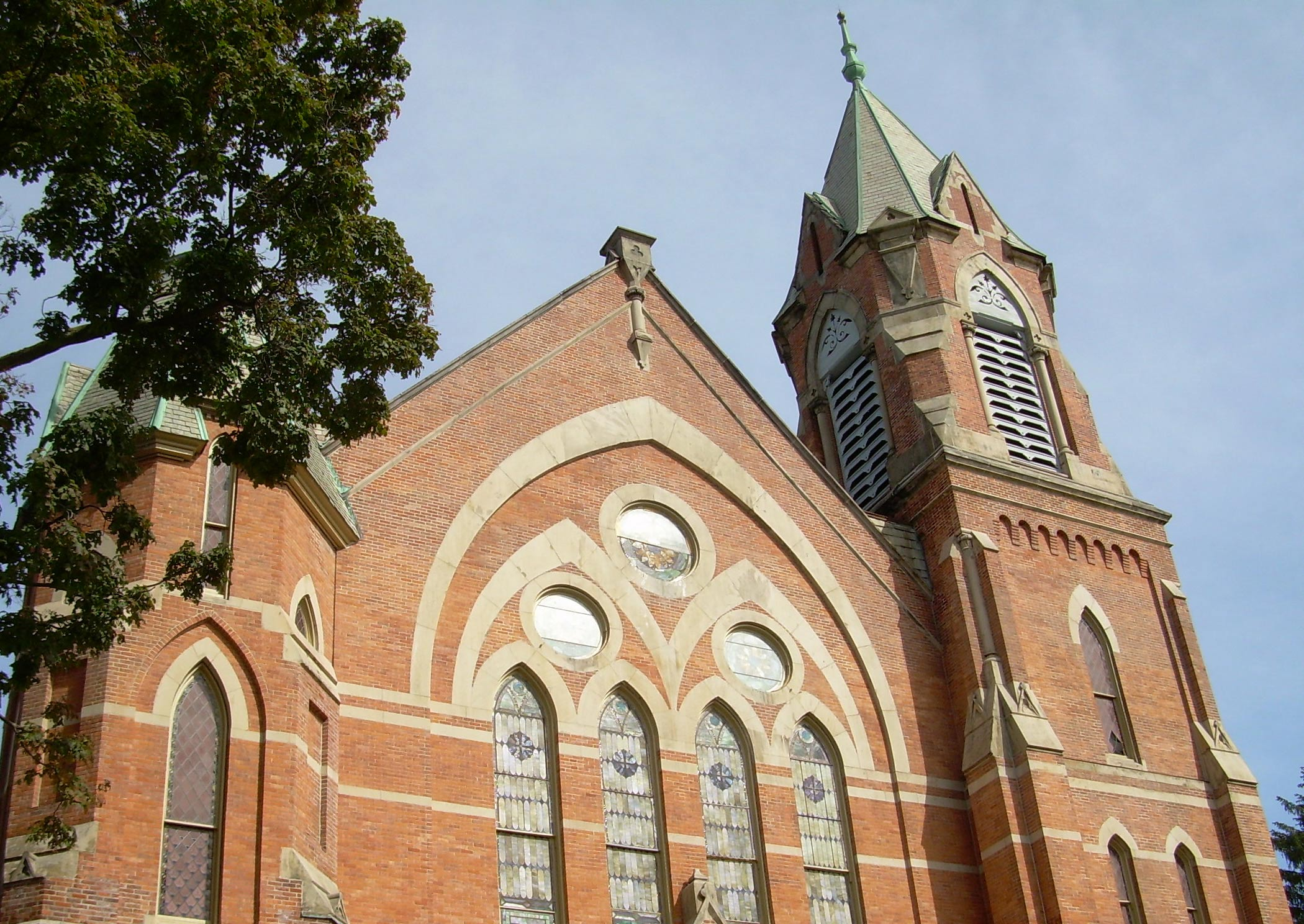
M. E. Church, Saratoga Springs, 1871.

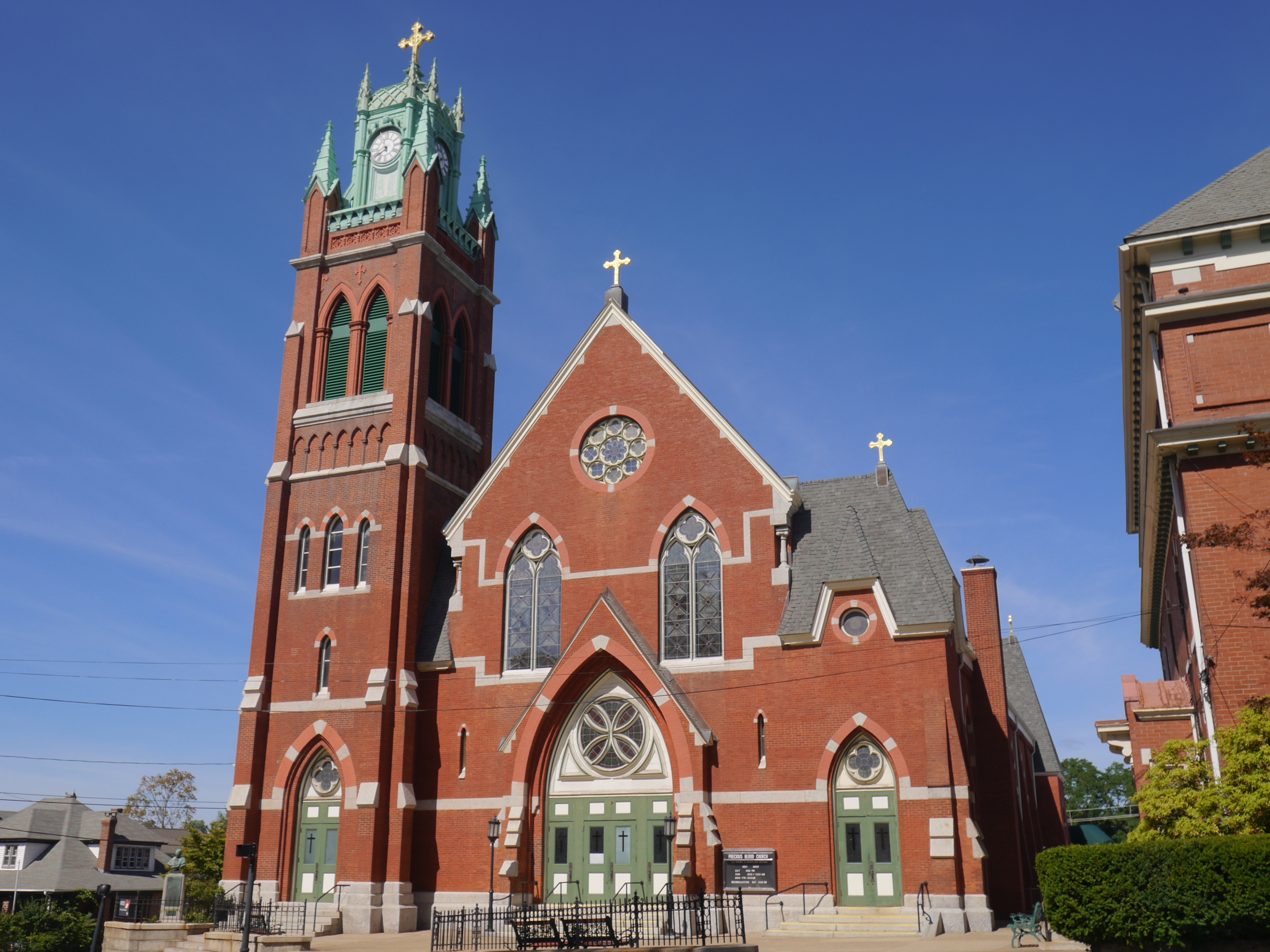
L'Eglise du Precieux Sang, Woonsocket, 1873.

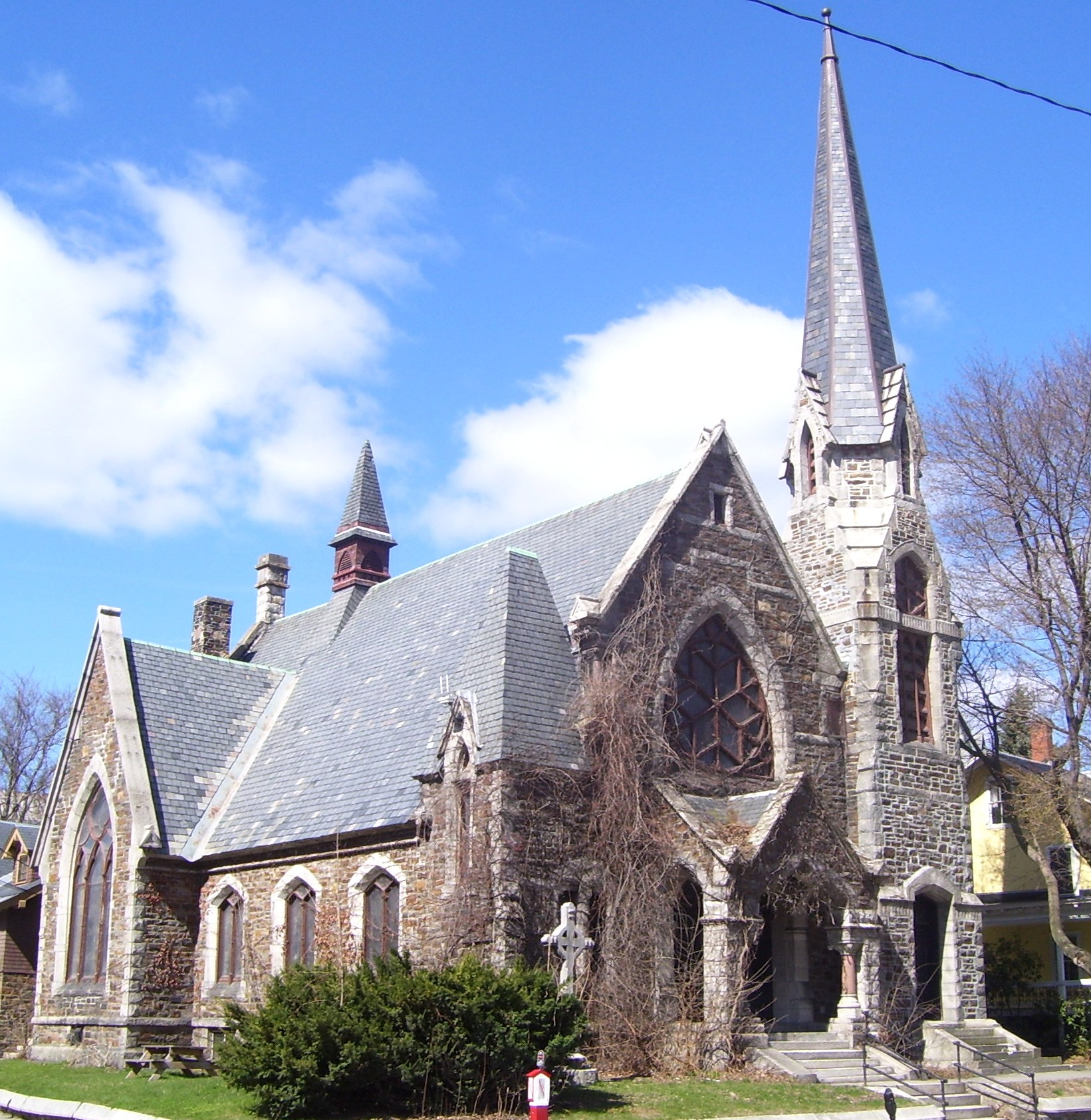
All Souls Unitarian Church, Brattleboro, 1874.

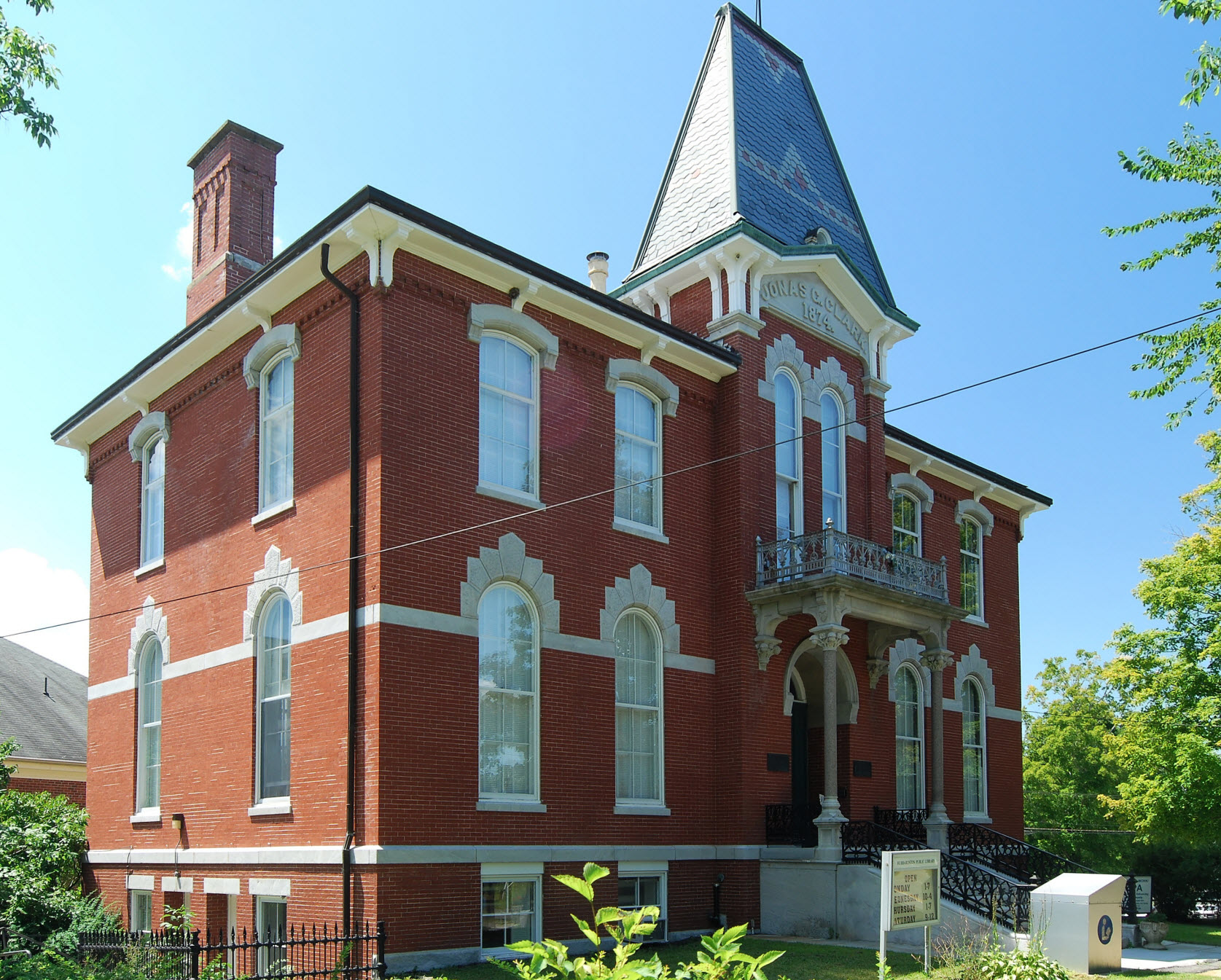
Public Library, Hubbardston, 1874.

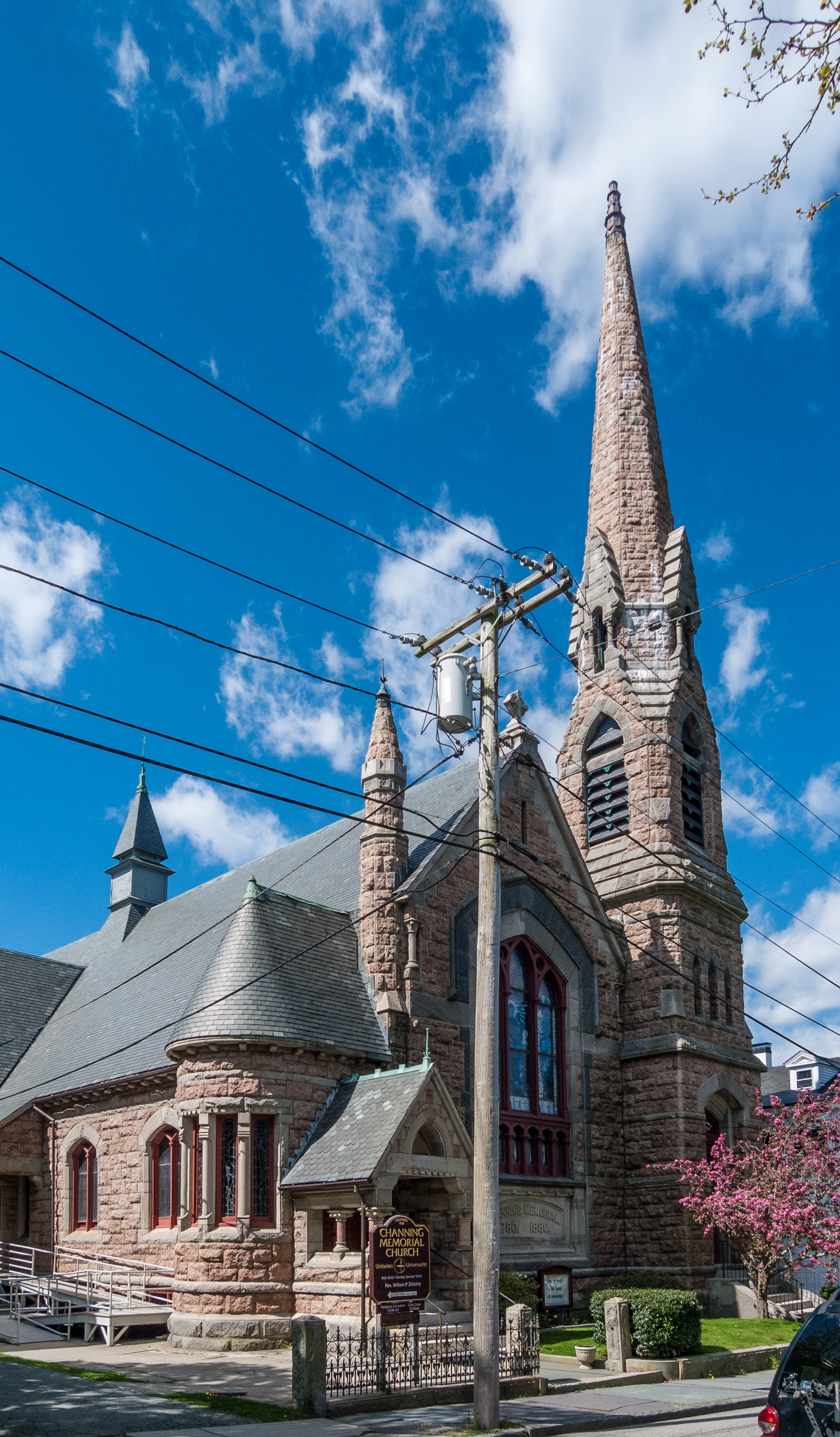
Channing Memorial Church, Newport, 1880.

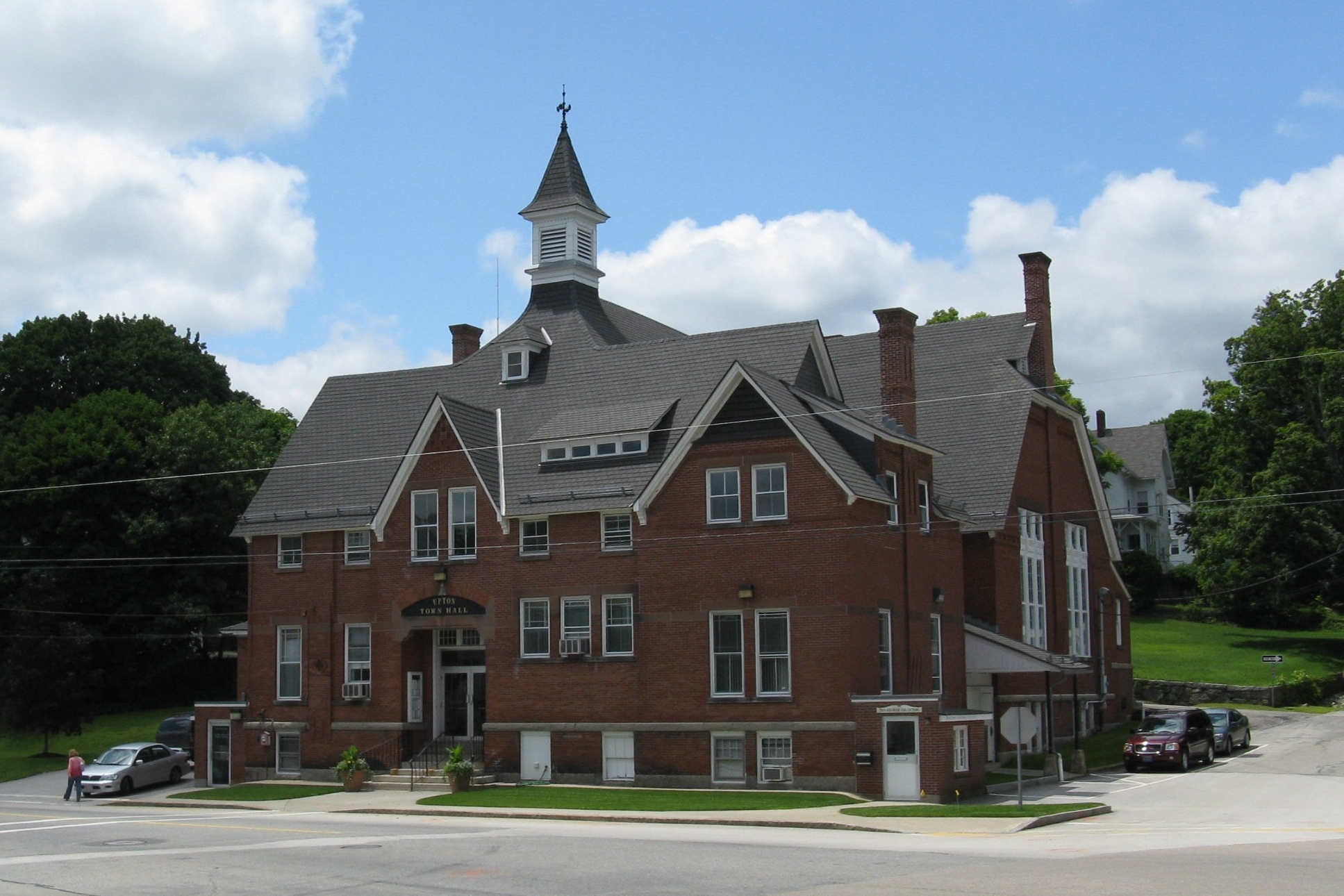
Town Hall, Upton, 1883.
