= Cambridge Street School =

- U.S. National Register of Historic Places
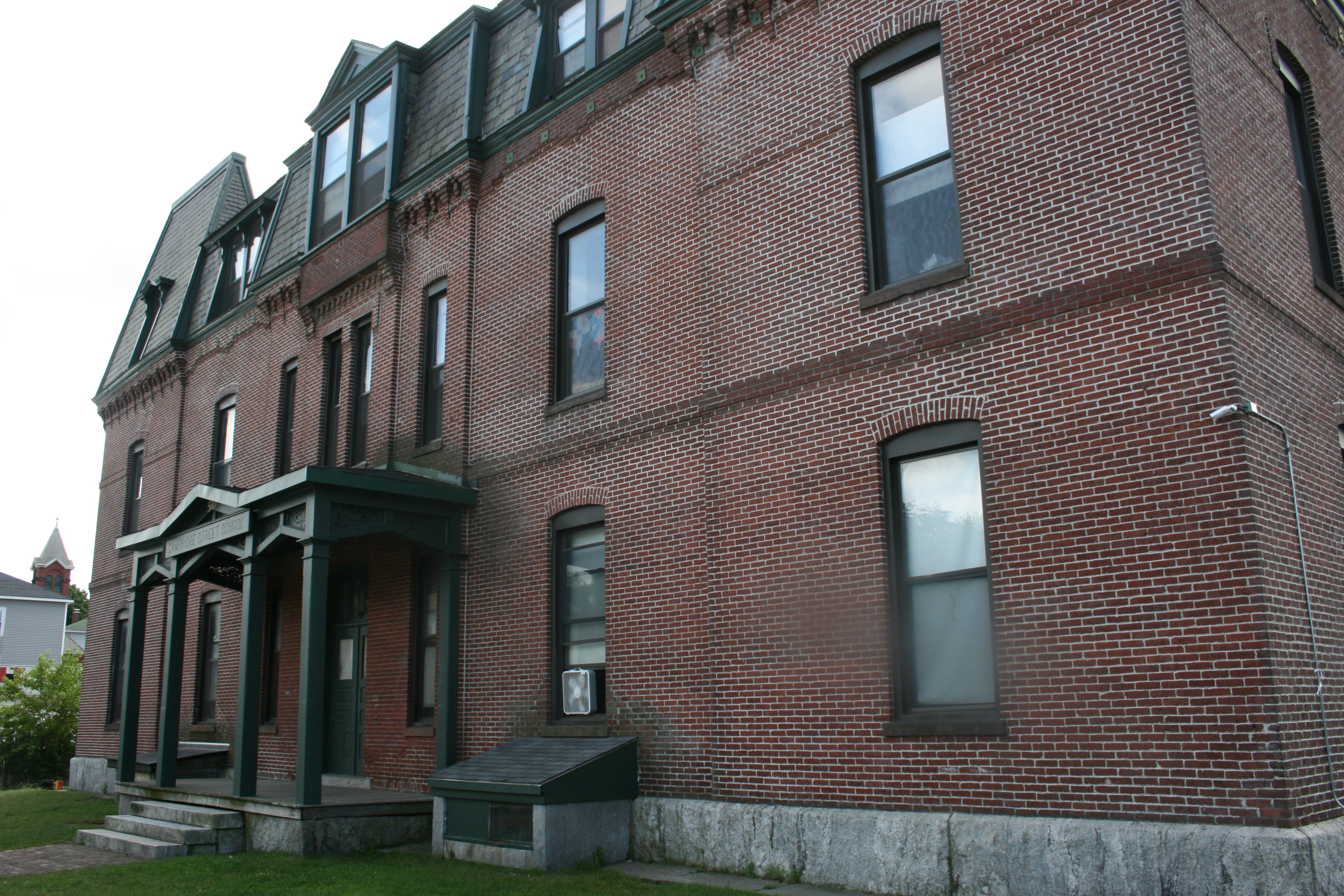

- Location within Massachusetts Location within the United States
- Location: 510 Cambridge St., Worcester, Massachusetts
- Coordinates: 42°14′37″N 71°48′38″W
- Area: less than one acre
- Built: 1869
- Architect: E. Boyden & Son
- Architectural style: Second Empire, Romanesque, Gothic Revival
- MPS: Worcester MRA
- NRHP reference No.: 80000484
- Added to NRHP: March 05, 1980

The Cambridge Street School is a historic former school building at 510 Cambridge Street in Worcester, Massachusetts. Built in 1869 and twice enlarged substantially, it is notable for including the only surviving unaltered Second Empire school building in the city. The building served Worcester's public school students until 1976; the city sold the building in 1978. It now serves as a transitional housing facility for homeless families. The building was listed on the National Register of Historic Places in 1980.

== Description and history ==
The former Cambridge Street School is located in southern Worcester, at the south west corner of McKeon and Cambridge Streets. It is separated from Southbridge Street by a shopping center. The school consists of three conjoined structures that were built at different times. In 1869 the front section was built; it is a three-story mansard-roofed brick building designed by local architects E. Boyden & Son. It has a tall mansard roof, and its front facade has a slightly projecting central pavilion and projecting end sections. The cornice has corbelled brickwork, and the main entrance is sheltered by a wood-frame porch.

In 1890 the school was expanded by the construction of a second brick building, a 2 1/2-story Romanesque Revival building, at the back (far southern edge) of the property. It has sandstone trim, and its main entrance faces east toward McKeon Street, sheltered by a gable-roofed porch supported by square brick and stone piers. Specifically Romanesque details are minimal, including a few round-arch windows. In 1916 a full three story Gothic Revival structure was built between the two.

The school was built in response to growing industrial economic along the Southbridge Street corridor and the nearby railroad lines. An increase in carpet manufacturing in the area led to increased demand and the construction of the second building. The buildings served as a public school until 1976, and were sold by the city in 1978. They now serve as a transitional housing facility for homeless families.

== See also ==
- National Register of Historic Places listings in southwestern Worcester, Massachusetts
- National Register of Historic Places listings in Worcester County, Massachusetts
