= Webster Street Firehouse =

- U.S. National Register of Historic Places
- Location within Massachusetts Location within the United States
- Location: 40 Webster St., Worcester, Massachusetts
- Coordinates: 42°14′38″N 71°50′0″W
- Built: 1893
- Architect: E. Boyden & Son
- MPS: Worcester MRA
- NRHP reference No.: 80000480
- Added to NRHP: March 5, 1980

The Webster Street Firehouse is a historic fire station at 40 Webster Street in Worcester, Massachusetts. The brick 2 1/2-story building was built in 1893 to a design by the local architectural firm of E. Boyden & Son. Its main facade is visually eclectic, with yellow brick and terracotta elements, brick pilasters topped with foliate decoration, and an arched window surmounted by a tower with iron cresting. There is a central four sided tower with open belfry that is topped by a steeply pitched roof.

The building was listed on the National Register of Historic Places in 1980. It was demolished circa 2000, a new fire station was built in its place.

== See also ==
- National Register of Historic Places listings in southwestern Worcester, Massachusetts
- National Register of Historic Places listings in Worcester County, Massachusetts
