= North Brookfield Town House =

- U.S. National Register of Historic Places
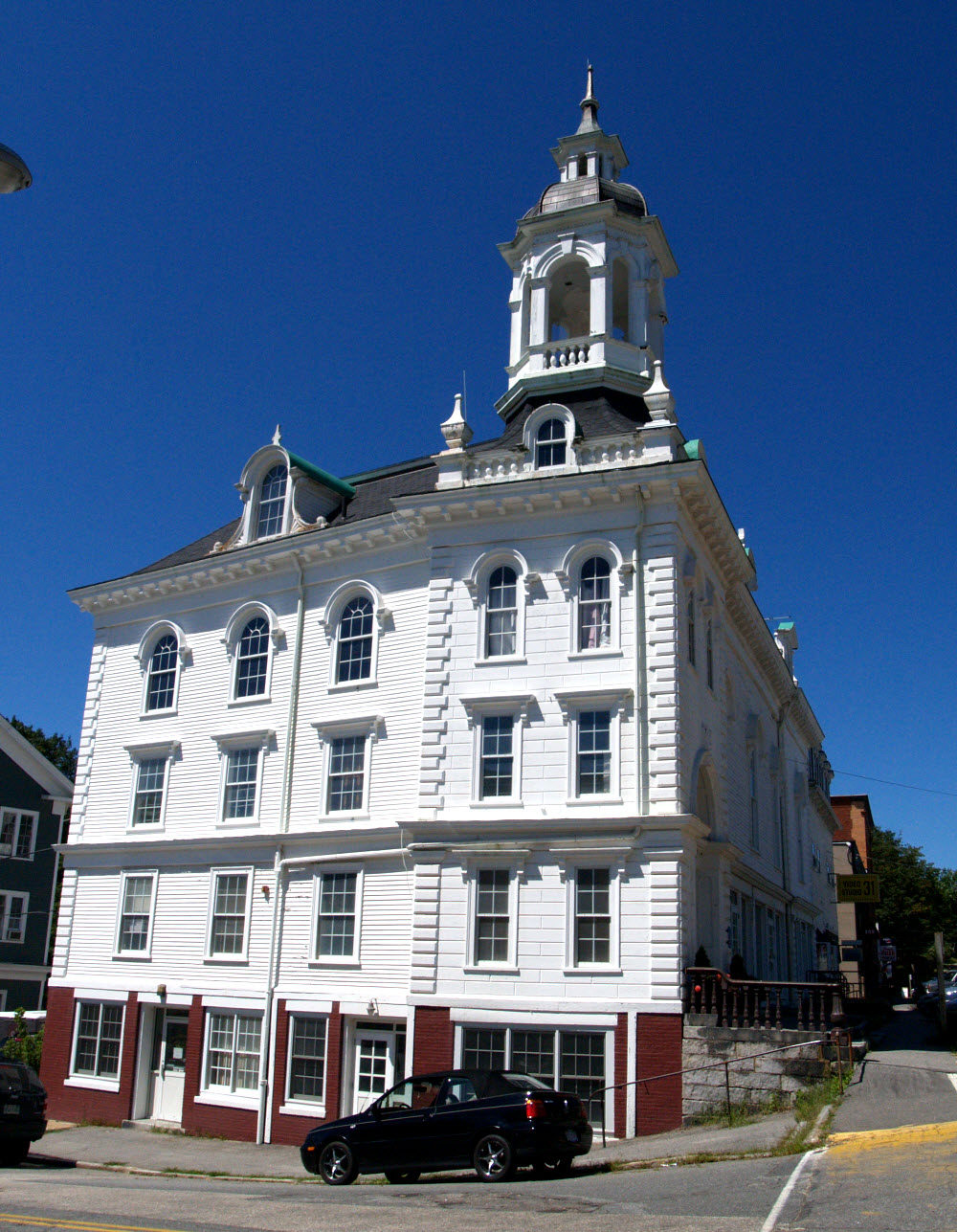

- Location within Massachusetts Location within the United States
- Location: North Brookfield, Massachusetts
- Coordinates: 42°16′7.5″N 72°5′7″W
- Built: 1864
- Architect: E. Boyden & Son
- Architectural style: Italianate, Second Empire
- NRHP reference No.: 01001185
- Added to NRHP: October 28, 2001

The North Brookfield Town House is a historic municipal building at 185 N. Main Street in North Brookfield, Massachusetts. The 3 1/2-story wood-frame building was built in 1864 to a design by E. Boyden & Son. The building is located prominently in the center of North Brookfield's commercial district, and is distinguished by the 60-foot (18 m) tower at the corner of North Main and Summer Streets. The building is richly decorated with Italianate and French Second Empire styling. It is the town's third town hall.

The building was listed on the National Register of Historic Places in 2001.

== See also ==
- National Register of Historic Places listings in Worcester County, Massachusetts
