= Larchmont (Worcester, Massachusetts) =

Historic house in Massachusetts, United States

- U.S. National Register of Historic Places
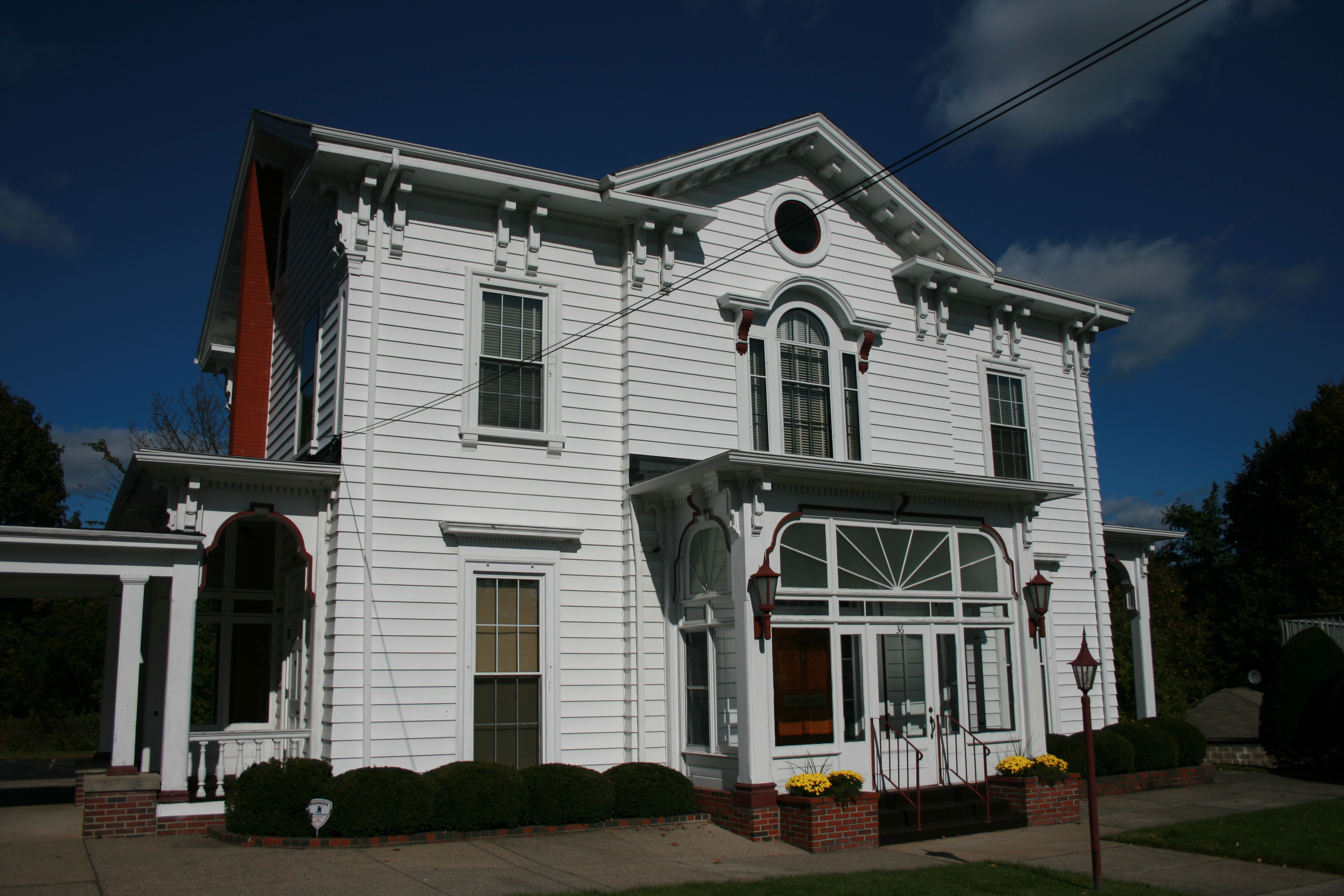

- Location within Massachusetts Location within the United States
- Location: 36 Butler St., Worcester, Massachusetts
- Coordinates: 42°14′6″N 71°47′58″W
- Area: less than one acre
- Built: 1858
- Architect: Boyden & Ball
- Architectural style: Italianate
- MPS: Worcester MRA
- NRHP reference No.: 80000492
- Added to NRHP: March 05, 1980

Larchmont is a historic house at 36 Butler Street in Worcester, Massachusetts. Built in 1858 as a country house, it is one of the city's finest surviving examples of Italianate architecture. It was listed on the National Register of Historic Places in 1980.

== Description and history ==
Larchmont is located in a residential area of southern Worcester, on the north side of Butler Street west of McKeon Road. It is a 2 1/2-story wood-frame structure, with a gabled roof and exterior finished in aluminum siding with wooden trim. Roof eaves are studded with paired Italianate brackets The front facade is three bays wide, with the center bay projecting slightly and capped by a gable. The main entrance is at the base of this bay, sheltered by an enclosed porch. The window above is Palladian in form, with a projecting bracketed cornice. Ground floor windows on either side of the entrance have projecting cornices, while second-floor windows have moulded surrounds with bracketed sills. A porte-cochere extends to the left side of the house.

The house was built in 1858 as a country house for Ransom Taylor, one of the city's largest landowners in the latter half of the 19th century. It is a rare surviving Italianate villa, of a type that once dotted the hills of Worcester, and is one of the finest Italianate houses in the city. The house may have been designed by Boyden & Ball; there is documentary evidence suggestive of this, which is supported by stylistic analysis. The building's original octagonal cupola has been removed, and the porte cochere is a later addition.

== See also ==
- National Register of Historic Places listings in eastern Worcester, Massachusetts
