= Ash Street School (Worcester, Massachusetts) =

- U.S. National Register of Historic Places
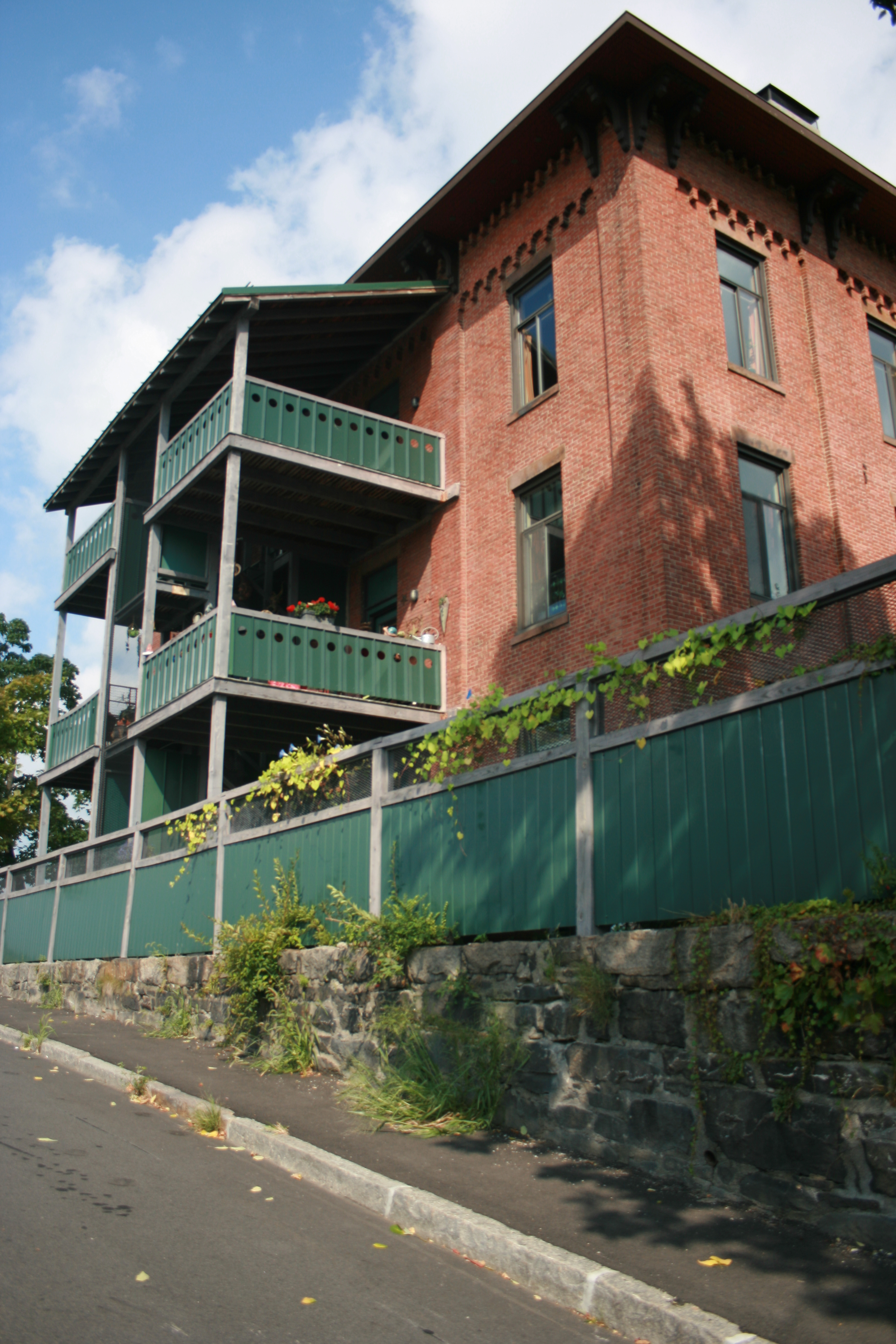

- Location within Massachusetts Location within the United States
- Location: 4 Ash St., Worcester, Massachusetts
- Coordinates: 42°15′35″N 71°40′41″W
- Area: less than one acre
- Built: 1850
- Architect: Boyden & Ball
- Architectural style: Italianate
- MPS: Worcester MRA
- NRHP reference No.: 80000542
- Added to NRHP: March 5, 1980

The Ash Street School is a historic school building at 4 Ash Street in Worcester, Massachusetts, United States. The Italianate style school was built as part of a wave of school construction in the city between 1848 and 1855, and is the city's second oldest surviving school. The building was listed on the National Register of Historic Places in 1980. It is presently home to a local land conservation organization.

== Description and history ==
The former Ash Street School stands in what is now a heavily industrialized and commercialized area south of downtown Worcester, on the north side of Ash Street west of Green Street. The lot it occupies is at the crest of a hill, making it highly visible. It is a square three story brick building with a low hip roof that has a deep bracketed cornice. Each facade has four bays, separated by piers that rise to corbelling just below the roof line. There are two entrances on each of the north and south sides, designed to provide separate entrances to boys and girls. It originally had a cupola, but that has been removed.

The school was built about 1850 to a design by noted local architect Elbridge Boyden, and was part of a major program by the city to expand its school facilities. At the time of its construction, the area where it stands was a densely populated neighborhood; it has since been largely redeveloped for industrial uses. The school was featured in architectural publications of the period (although one somewhat quixotically described it as a multiunit residence). At the time of its listing on the National Register, it was serving as a storehouse. It is presently home to the Greater Worcester Land Trust, a land conservation organization.

== See also ==
- National Register of Historic Places listings in northwestern Worcester, Massachusetts
- National Register of Historic Places listings in Worcester County, Massachusetts
