= National Register of Historic Places listings in Chaves County, New Mexico =

Location of Chaves County in New Mexico

This is a list of the National Register of Historic Places listings in Chaves County, New Mexico.

This is intended to be a complete list of the properties and districts on the National Register of Historic Places in Chaves County, New Mexico, United States. Latitude and longitude coordinates are provided for many National Register properties and districts; these locations may be seen together in a map.

There are 21 properties and districts listed on the National Register in the county. All of the places within the county on the National Register are also listed on the State Register of Cultural Properties.

This National Park Service list is complete through NPS recent listings posted December 12, 2025.

Contents: NRHP in New Mexico by county
Bernalillo – Catron – Chaves – Cibola – Colfax – Curry – De Baca – Doña Ana – Eddy – Grant – Guadalupe – Harding – Hidalgo – Lea – Lincoln – Los Alamos – Luna – McKinley – Mora – Otero – Quay – Rio Arriba – Roosevelt – San Juan – San Miguel – Sandoval – Santa Fe – Sierra – Socorro – Taos – Torrance – Union – Valencia

== Current listings ==
	Name on the Register	Image	Date listed	Location	City or town	Description
1	CA Bar Ranch		August 29, 1988 (#85003634)	U.S. Route 82 3 miles west of its junction with State Road 24; 32°53′38″N 105°13′26″W	Mayhill	
2	Chaves County Courthouse	Chaves County Courthouse	February 15, 1989 (#87000892)	400 block of Main St. 33°23′49″N 104°31′17″W	Roswell	
3	Diamond A Ranch		August 29, 1988 (#85003635)	About 14 miles west of Roswell along U.S. Route 380, then 2 miles south on a private ranch road 33°21′06″N 104°51′08″W	Roswell	Ranch headquarters building and bunkhouse built of stone in late 1880s or early 1990s
4	Downtown Roswell Historic District	Downtown Roswell Historic District	May 16, 1985 (#85001543)	Roughly bounded by 8th St., Richardson Ave., Albuquerque St., and Missouri Ave. 33°24′05″N 104°31′36″W	Roswell	
5	Federal Building and U.S. Courthouse	Federal Building and U.S. Courthouse	November 17, 2023 (#100009559)	500 N. Richardson Avenue; 33°23′53″N 104°31′28″W	Roswell	
6	Flying H Ranch		September 14, 1988 (#85003633)	Off U.S. Route 70 between Hope and Elk Area; 33°00′41″N 105°08′22″W	Roswell	
7	Patrick Floyd Garrett House		August 29, 1988 (#85003637)	Bosque Rd. 3 miles north of Roswell; 33°24′14″N 104°26′17″W	Roswell	
8	Robert H. Goddard House		July 15, 1988 (#85003594)	Route 3 E. on Mescalero Rd. 33°25′53″N 104°30′07″W	Roswell	
9	The Henge		August 1, 2019 (#100004221)	3600 La Joya Rd. 33°26′31″N 104°29′55″W	Roswell vicinity	
10	Louise Massey House	Louise Massey House	May 16, 1985 (#85001544)	209 W. Alameda St. 33°23′28″N 104°31′32″W	Roswell	Home of country singer Louise Massey
11	Millhiser-Baker Farm		August 29, 1988 (#85003638)	Route 1 0.5 miles south of McGaffey; 33°22′26″N 104°33′04″W	Roswell	
12	Milne-Bush Ranch		August 29, 1988 (#85003639)	Route 1; 33°26′14″N 104°30′01″W	Roswell	
13	New Mexico Military Institute Historic District	New Mexico Military Institute Historic District	May 7, 1987 (#87000907)	Roughly bounded by 19th and N. Main Sts., College Boulevard, and Kentucky Ave. 33°19′52″N 104°31′31″W	Roswell	
14	Ozark Trails Marker at Lake Arthur	Ozark Trails Marker at Lake Arthur	July 16, 2004 (#04000702)	Junction of Main and Broadway Sts. 33°00′00″N 104°21′57″W	Lake Arthur	
15	Rio Felix Bridge at Hagerman	Rio Felix Bridge at Hagerman	July 15, 1997 (#97000737)	U.S. Route 285 over Rio Felix; 33°07′53″N 104°20′11″W	Hagerman	Pratt through truss three-span bridge
16	Roswell Artist-in-Residence Compound		August 7, 2017 (#100001436)	1404 W. Berrendo Rd. 33°26′16″N 104°32′29″W	Roswell	
17	Saunders-Crosby House	Saunders-Crosby House	May 16, 1985 (#85001545)	200 E. Deming; 33°23′07″N 104°31′14″W	Roswell	
18	Slaughter-Hill Ranch		August 29, 1988 (#85003640)	1601 E. 2nd St. 33°23′52″N 104°29′47″W	Roswell	
19	South Spring Ranch		April 24, 1989 (#88003465)	Route 2; 33°20′46″N 104°28′10″W	Roswell	
20	Urton Orchards		August 29, 1988 (#85003641)	Route 3; 33°26′04″N 104°29′10″W	Roswell	
21	James Phelps White House	James Phelps White House	July 24, 1978 (#78001812)	200 N. Lea Ave. 33°23′40″N 104°31′44″W	Roswell	

== See also ==
- List of National Historic Landmarks in New Mexico
- National Register of Historic Places listings in New Mexico
