= National Register of Historic Places listings in De Baca County, New Mexico =

Location of De Baca County in New Mexico

This is a list of the National Register of Historic Places listings in De Baca County, New Mexico.

This is intended to be a complete list of the properties and districts on the National Register of Historic Places in De Baca County, New Mexico, United States. Latitude and longitude coordinates are provided for many National Register properties and districts; these locations may be seen together in a map.

There are 5 properties listed on the National Register in the county. All of the places within the county on the National Register are also listed on the State Register of Cultural Properties.

This National Park Service list is complete through NPS recent listings posted March 14, 2025.

Contents: NRHP in New Mexico by county
Bernalillo – Catron – Chaves – Cibola – Colfax – Curry – De Baca – Doña Ana – Eddy – Grant – Guadalupe – Harding – Hidalgo – Lea – Lincoln – Los Alamos – Luna – McKinley – Mora – Otero – Quay – Rio Arriba – Roosevelt – San Juan – San Miguel – Sandoval – Santa Fe – Sierra – Socorro – Taos – Torrance – Union – Valencia

== Current listings ==
	Name on the Register	Image	Date listed	Location	City or town	Description
1	De Baca County Courthouse	De Baca County Courthouse	December 7, 1987 (#87000896)	500 block of Ave. C 34°28′20″N 104°14′35″W	Fort Sumner	
2	Fort Sumner Cemetery Wall and Entry	Fort Sumner Cemetery Wall and Entry	July 2, 2008 (#08000575)	17th St. and Dunn Ave., 1 mile north of intersection of 17th and U.S. Route 60; 34°28′39″N 104°13′43″W	Fort Sumner	
3	Fort Sumner Community House	Fort Sumner Community House	August 21, 2003 (#03000798)	Junction of U.S. Route 84 and Baker Ave. 34°28′42″N 104°14′40″W	Fort Sumner	
4	Fort Sumner Railroad Bridge	Fort Sumner Railroad Bridge	March 21, 1979 (#79001539)	2 miles (3.2 km) west of Fort Sumner over the Pecos River; 34°29′06″N 104°15′31″W	Fort Sumner	
5	Fort Sumner Ruins	Fort Sumner Ruins	August 13, 1974 (#74001194)	Address Restricted	Fort Sumner	Fort Sumner Historic Site/Bosque Redondo Memorial

== See also ==
- List of National Historic Landmarks in New Mexico
- National Register of Historic Places listings in New Mexico
