= Crosby House =

Crosby House may refer to:

- Dr. Cyrus F. Crosby House, Heber Springs, Arkansas, listed on the U.S. National Register of Historic Places (NRHP)
- Crosby House (Barnstable, Massachusetts), now the Crowell–Smith House, NRHP-listed
- Daniel Crosby House, Osterville, Barnstable, Massachusetts, NRHP-listed
- Saunders-Crosby House, Roswell, New Mexico, NRHP-listed
- Alma Crosby House, Beaver, Utah, NRHP-listed
- Crosby House (Tumwater, Washington), NRHP-listed
- James B. Crosby House, Janesville, Wisconsin, NRHP-listed
