= Goddard House =

Goddard House may refer to:

in the United States

(by state then city)

- John Goddard House, Brookline, Massachusetts, NRHP-listed
- Goddard House (Worcester, Massachusetts), NRHP-listed in Worcester County
- Harry Goddard House, Worcester, Massachusetts, NRHP-listed in Worcester County
- Robert H. Goddard House, Roswell, New Mexico, listed on the NRHP in Chaves County
- A house in St George's School, Harpenden

== See also ==
- Goddard Hall (disambiguation)
