= Pedro Cervántez =

American painter

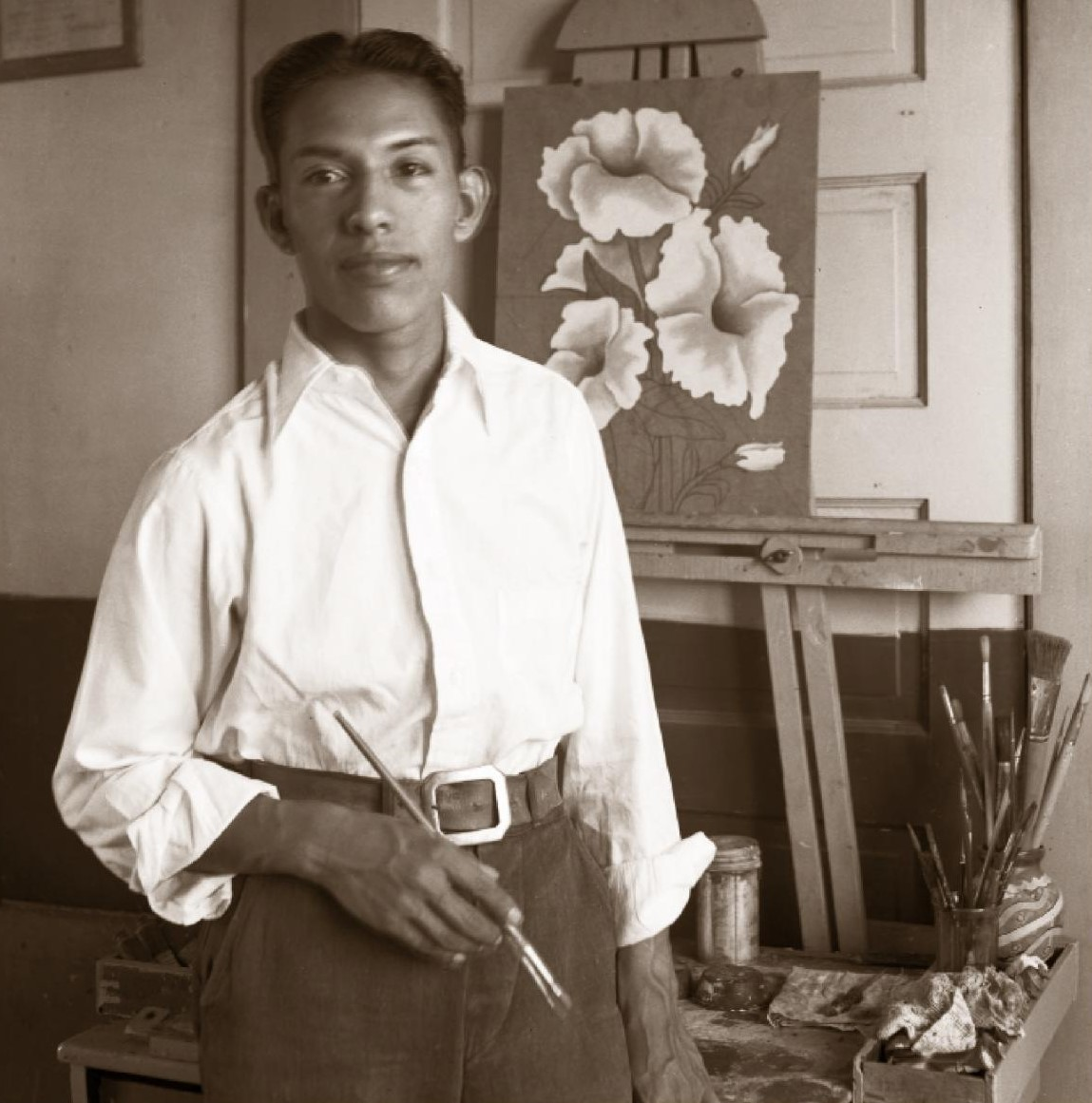
- Cervántez in his New Mexico studio, c. 1940
- Born: May 19, 1914; Willcox, Arizona
- Died: July 3, 1987 (aged 73); Clovis, New Mexico
- Education: Eastern New Mexico College
- Known for: Painting
- Style: Regionalism, Self-taught art

Pedro Cervántez (May 19, 1914 – July 3, 1987) was an American painter of Mexican descent, who lived and worked in New Mexico. In the wake of his projects for the Works Progress Administration and participation in a MoMA exhibition in 1938, he became one of the first Hispanic American visual artists to receive national recognition.

== Life and career ==
Pedro Lopez Cervántez was born to Mexican parents, Avelino Cervántez (1890–1971) and Inez Lopez (1894–1972), in Willcox, Arizona, and grew up in Texico, New Mexico, on the Texas border. A largely self-taught artist, his first major project was assisting painter Russell Vernon Hunter (1900–1955) with his three-part mural The Last Frontier (1934) at the De Baca County Courthouse in Fort Sumner. In turn, Hunter recommended Cervántez for the Federal Art Project of the Works Progress Administration, a New Deal agency.

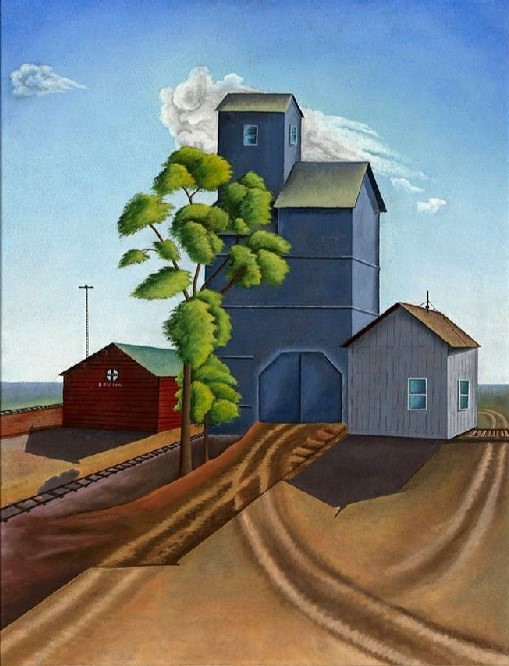
Bovina Elevators, 1937

Sponsored by the federal government, Cervántez produced a number of paintings between 1934 and 1938, when ten of his works were included in the landmark exhibition Masters of Popular Painting: Modern Primitives of Europe and America, held at New York’s Museum of Modern Art from April to July 1938.

Following the success of the show, Cervántez enrolled at Eastern New Mexico College to pursue formal artistic training. He obtained a two-year scholarship to study in Paris, though the outbreak of WWII thwarted his plans. Between 1942 and 1944, he served as a private first class in a tank destroyer battalion and was stationed in North Africa and Italy. His only show during war years was a one-man exhibition of his paintings in New Orleans in 1941, which included some of his best-known WPA works, such as Bovina Elevators (1937).

He married in 1946 and moved to Clovis, New Mexico, where he continued painting into the 1950s and 1960s. Cervántez died on July 3, 1987, in Clovis.

== Museum collections ==
Paintings by Cervántez are found in the collections of the Smithsonian American Art Museum, San Francisco Museum of Modern Art, Sheldon Museum of Art, Oklahoma City Museum of Art, and Panhandle–Plains Historical Museum.
