= Roswell Historic District =

Roswell Historic District may refer to:

- Downtown Roswell Historic District, Roswell, New Mexico
- Roswell Historic District (Roswell, Georgia), in Roswell, Fulton County, Georgia
