= De Baca County Courthouse =

- U.S. National Register of Historic Places
- NM State Register of Cultural Properties
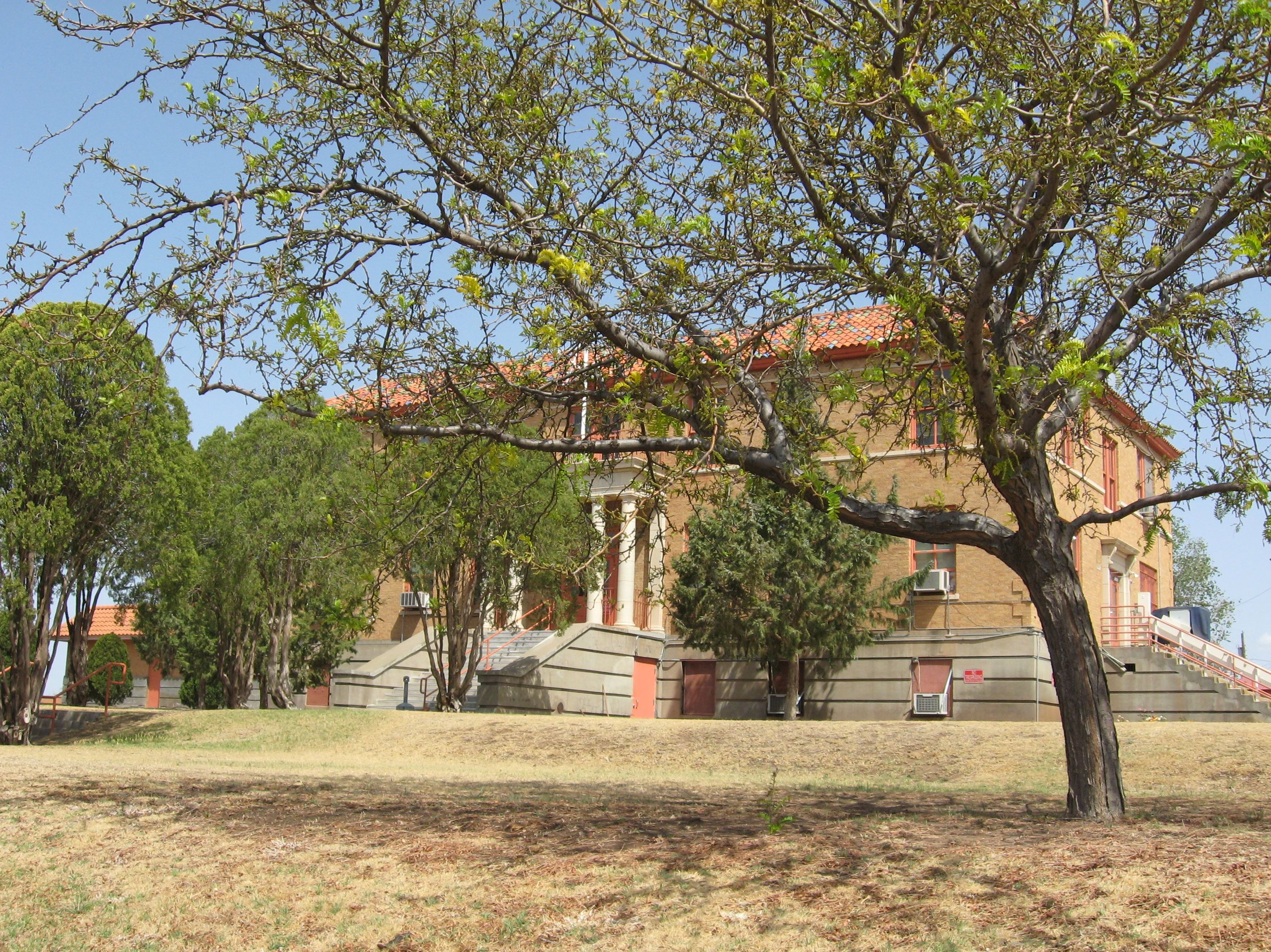

- Location within New Mexico Location within the United States
- Location: 500 blk. Ave. C, Fort Sumner, New Mexico
- Coordinates: 34°28′20″N 104°14′35″W
- Area: 2.5 acres (1.0 ha)
- Built: 1930
- Architect: Kerr & Walsh
- Architectural style: Colonial Revival, Georgian Revival
- MPS: County Courthouses of New Mexico TR
- NRHP reference No.: 87000896
- NMSRCP No.: 1270

Significant dates
- Added to NRHP: December 7, 1987
- Designated NMSRCP: May 9, 1986

The De Baca County Courthouse, located on Ave. C in Fort Sumner, New Mexico within De Baca County, is a historic building built in 1930. It was designed by architects Kerr & Walsh and includes Colonial Revival and, more specifically, Georgian Revival architecture. The building was listed on the National Register of Historic Places (NRHP) in 1987.

It is one of 14 New Mexico county courthouses that were reviewed for their historical significance in 1987; the county courthouse of Doña Ana County, was the first and only other Georgian Revival style county courthouse within the state.

== See also ==
- National Register of Historic Places listings in De Baca County, New Mexico
