= Goddard Hall =

Goddard Hall may refer to:

- Goddard Hall (New Mexico State University), Las Cruces, New Mexico, listed on the National Register of Historic Places
- Goddard Hall (New York University), New York, New York, a residential college
- Goddard Hall (Tufts University), Medford, Massachusetts

== See also ==
- Goddard House (disambiguation)
