= Fort Sumner Cemetery Wall and Entry =

Historic site in De Baca County, New Mexico, US

- U.S. National Register of Historic Places
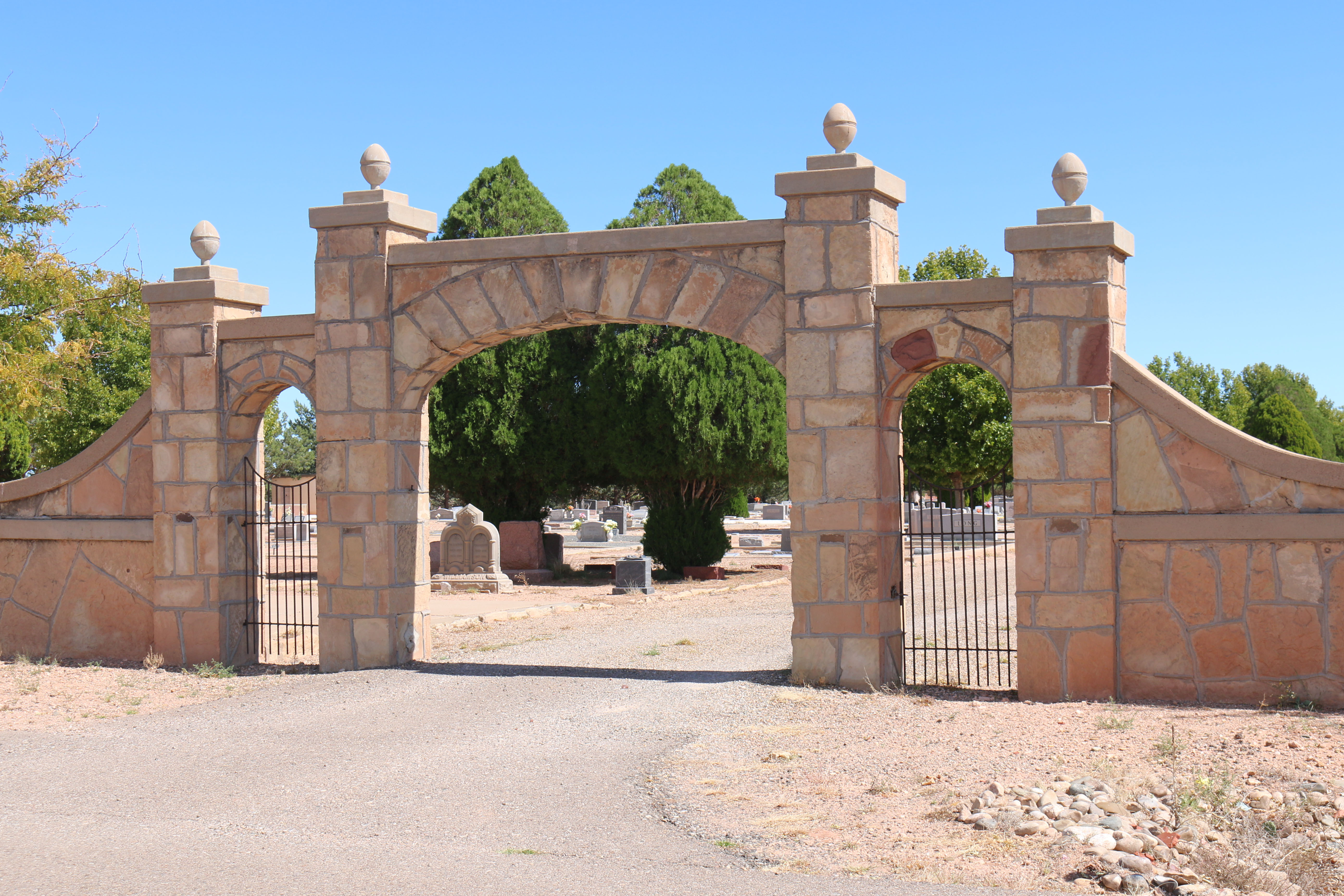

- Location within New Mexico
- Location: 17th and Dunn Sts, 1 mile north of intersection of 17th and U.S. 60, Fort Sumner, New Mexico
- Coordinates: 34°28′39″N 104°13′43″W
- Area: less than one acre
- Built: 1938–39
- Built by: Works Progress Administration
- Architectural style: Masonry wall and entry
- MPS: New Deal in New Mexico MPS
- NRHP reference No.: 08000575
- Added to NRHP: July 2, 2008

The Fort Sumner Cemetery Wall and Entry, at 17th and Dunn Sts, 1 mile north of intersection of 17th and U.S. 60 in Fort Sumner, New Mexico, was a Works Progress Administration project in 1938 and 1939. It was listed on the National Register of Historic Places in 2008.
