= Fort Sumner Community House =

- U.S. National Register of Historic Places
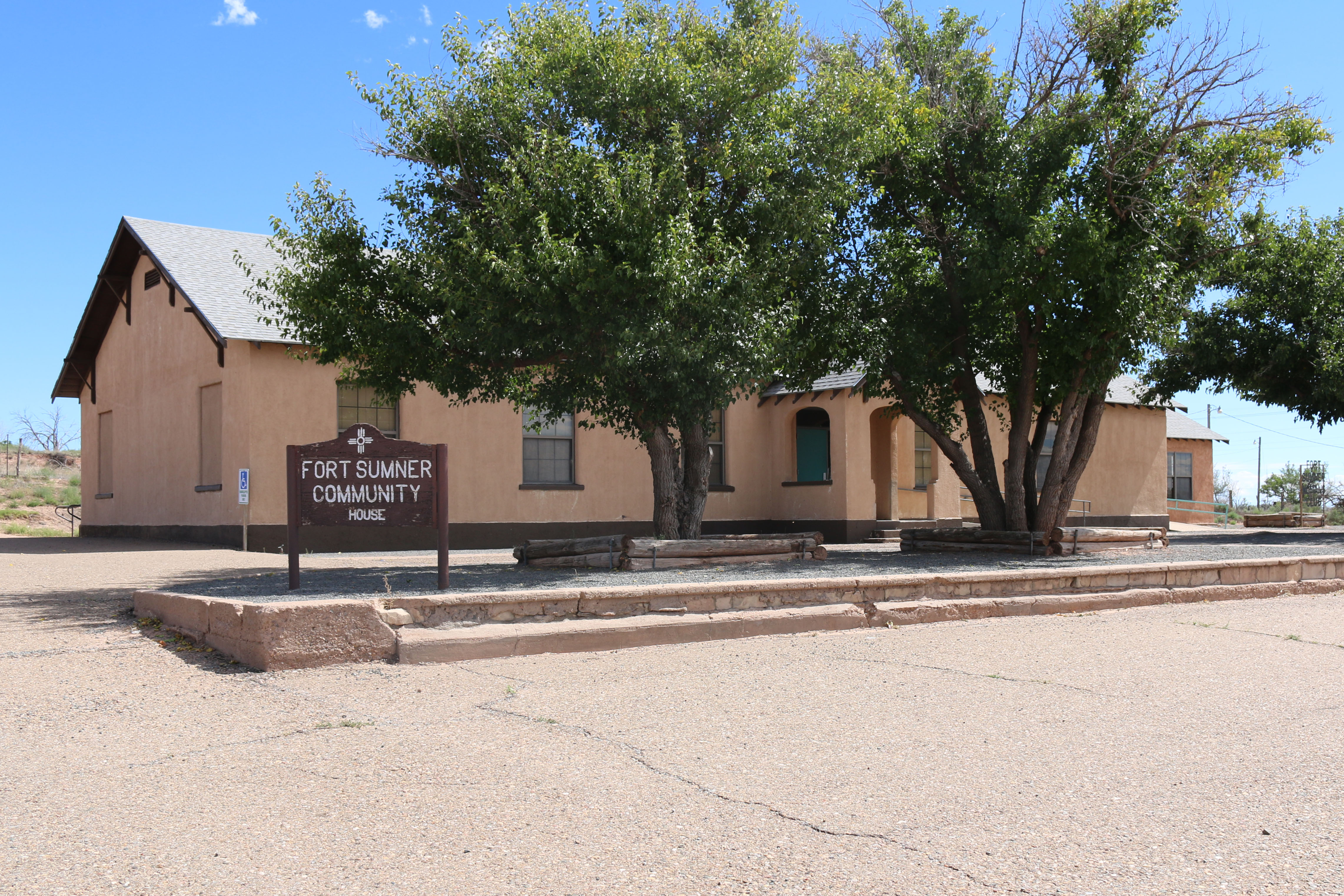

- Location within New Mexico
- Location: Junction of U.S. Route 84 and Baker Ave., Fort Sumner, New Mexico
- Coordinates: 34°28′42″N 104°14′40″W
- Area: less than one acre
- Built: 1939-40, c.1942
- Architectural style: Bungalow/Craftsman
- MPS: New Mexico Federation of Women's Club Buildings in New Mexico MPS
- NRHP reference No.: 03000798
- Added to NRHP: August 21, 2003

The Fort Sumner Community House, at the Junction of U.S. Route 84 and Baker Avenue in Fort Sumner, New Mexico, was erected in 1939. It was listed on the National Register of Historic Places in 2003.

It includes the Fort Sumner Women's Club, in a c.1942 addition along its south side. It was built as a Works Progress Administration project out of adobe brick.
