= Fort Sumner Railroad Bridge =

- U.S. National Register of Historic Places
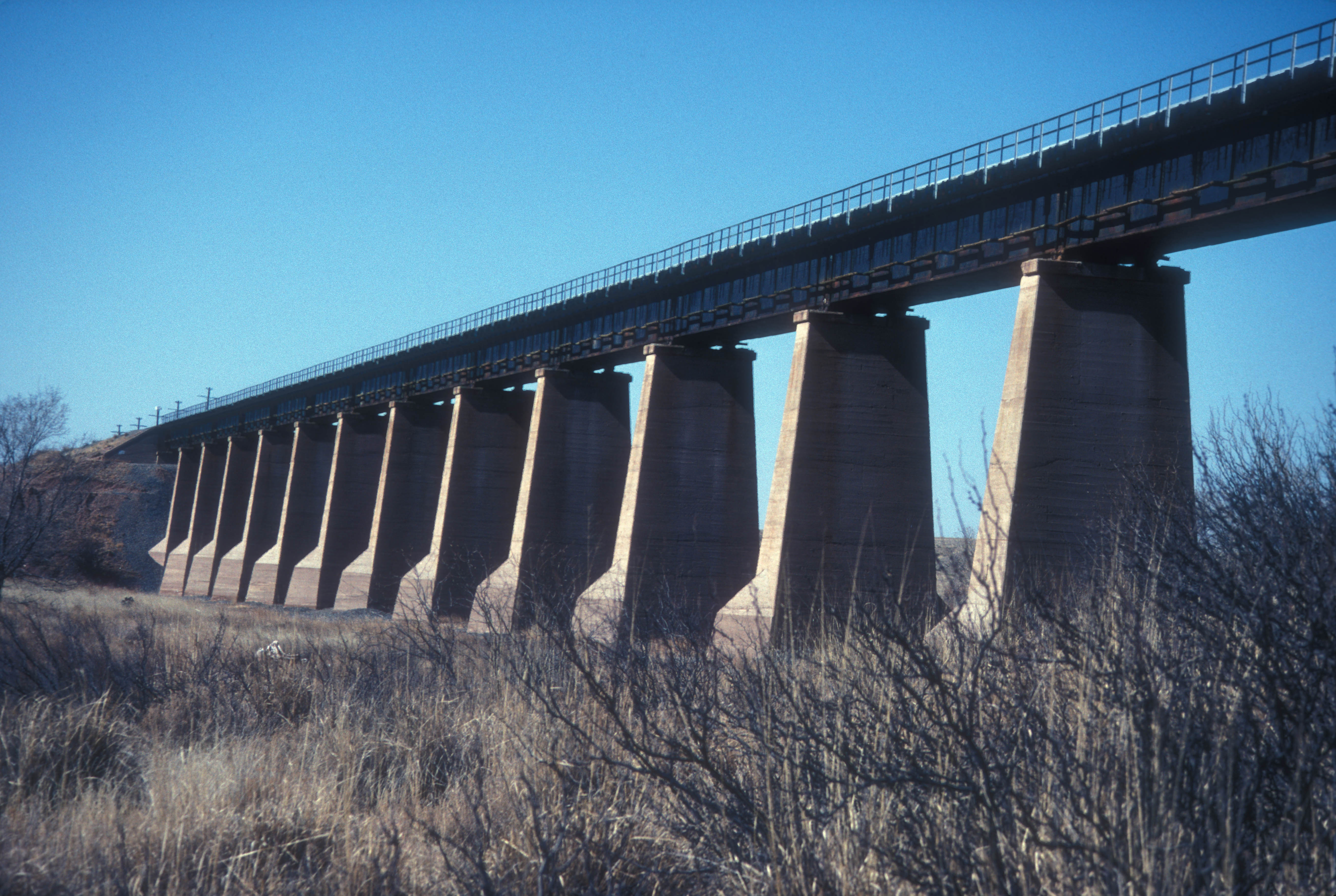

- Location within New Mexico
- Nearest city: Fort Sumner, New Mexico
- Coordinates: 34°29′06″N 104°15′31″W
- Area: 4 acres (1.6 ha)
- Built: 1905
- Built by: Atchison, Topeka & Santa Fe Railway
- Architectural style: Plate-girder design
- NRHP reference No.: 79001539
- Added to NRHP: March 21, 1979

The Fort Sumner Railroad Bridge, over the Pecos River 2 miles (3.2 km) west of Fort Sumner, New Mexico, was built in 1905. It was listed on the National Register of Historic Places in 1979.

It is a plate-girder design bridge, 1,500 feet (460 m) in length, built by the Atchison, Topeka & Santa Fe Railway. It consists of fifteen 100 feet (30 m) Class AA Deck Plate Girders supported by 14 concrete piers and two concrete winged abutments. It rises 77 feet (23 m).
