= Federal Reserve Police =

Law enforcement unit of the U.S. Federal Reserve

U.S. Federal Reserve Police
- Patch of the Federal Reserve Police
- Motto: Protecting the nation's economy

Jurisdictional structure
- Federal agency: United States
- Operations jurisdiction: United States
- Constituting instrument: United States Code Title 12 Chapter 3 Part II Section 248(q)
- General nature: Federal law enforcement; Civilian police

Operational structure
- Sworn members: 1,000+
- Parent agency: United States Federal Reserve System

Facilities
- Stations: 37

The U.S. Federal Reserve Police is the law enforcement unit of the Federal Reserve System, the central banking system of the United States.

== History ==
Federal Reserve System Law Enforcement Officers derive their authority from the USA PATRIOT Act, which modified Section 11(q) of the Federal Reserve Act, codified at 12 U.S.C. § 248(q) to include a uniform law enforcement division. Similar to other federal agencies, Federal Reserve police officers are able to arrest without warrant for any federal felony or misdemeanor committed in their presence, or for federal felonies with probable cause anywhere within the United States.

Prior to designation as federal law enforcement officers, system protection personnel operated as protection or special police officers in their respective states and were generally regulated to exercising authority on Federal Reserve property, with variances dependent on specific district regulations. Prior to federal law enforcement designation, there were no plainclothes or specialized units in the System.

== Functions ==
Each Federal Reserve law enforcement office in the twelve regional districts is an independent law enforcement unit, with oversight out of Washington, D.C..

The primary duty of uniformed division officers is to provide security and general law enforcement services for Federal Reserve facilities, personnel and operations. Each Federal Reserve district operates a 24/7 emergency communications (command) center. Some Federal Reserve districts employ sworn intelligence officers while others utilize non-sworn civilian intelligence specialist.

Some districts have Explosive Detector Dog teams that are utilized at several facilities. Each district maintains Executive Protection personnel, capable of safeguarding Federal Reserve executives throughout the United States. Some districts also have Special Response Teams (SRT).

Each branch, or field office, also maintains officers authorized by federal or state agencies (POST) to provide defensive tactics, firearms, and general instructor capabilities to their respective units.

=== Equipment ===
U.S. Federal Reserve Police officers are certified to carry a variety of weapons systems, including semi-automatic pistols, assault rifles, and submachine guns. They also carry less lethal weapons including pepper spray, batons, tasers, and other standard police equipment. Police officers also wear body armor in both covert and overt forms.

On October 12, 2010, President Barack Obama signed into law S.B. 1132 "Law Enforcement Officers' Safety Act Improvements Act", which states that law enforcement officers of the Federal Reserve are "qualified law enforcement officers" and thus are authorized to carry a firearm off-duty. This update to the Law Enforcement Officers Safety Act, among other aspects, clarified that federal law enforcement officers working for Amtrak and the Federal Reserve (not funded by Congress) are specifically granted the same rights as publicly funded law enforcement officers as it relates to off-duty concealed carry.

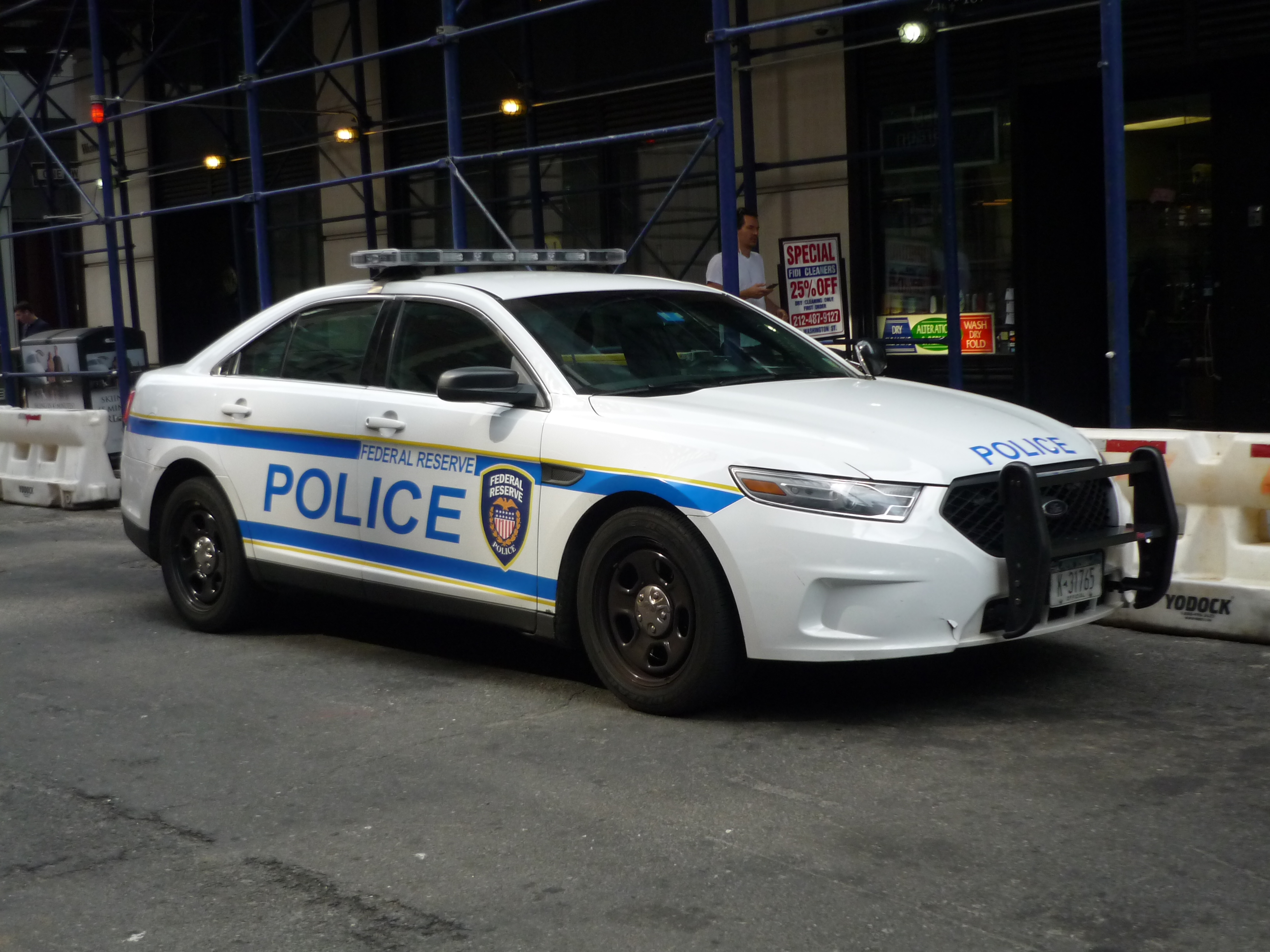
A Ford Taurus Police Interceptor in FRPD service, in New York City.

Each district can choose the make, model and livery/design of police vehicles, which vary based on location and weather. There are both marked and unmarked police cars in the Federal Reserve fleet.

== Employment ==
Federal Reserve Law Enforcement Officers must complete a Federal Law Enforcement Training Accreditation (FLETA) approved Basic Law Enforcement Course, or BLEC, in addition to field training. Officers are required to complete in-service training each year to maintain their Federal Law Enforcement designation. Some districts offer a lateral entry program that allows certification with minimal training for those with prior police training and experience.

Because the Federal Reserve System is independent of the federal government, Federal Reserve Law Enforcement Officers have a benefits system separate from, but very similar to, federal employees, offering both pension and retirement. Each district has a different pay scale based on the local cost of living index. The average entry level uniformed officer earns compensation comparable to a GS-9 on the public federal pay scale, which is variable depending on location of assignment. Officers typically receive shift differential, and in some cases specialized duty pay, such as canine, executive protection, SRT, background investigator, or FTO pay.

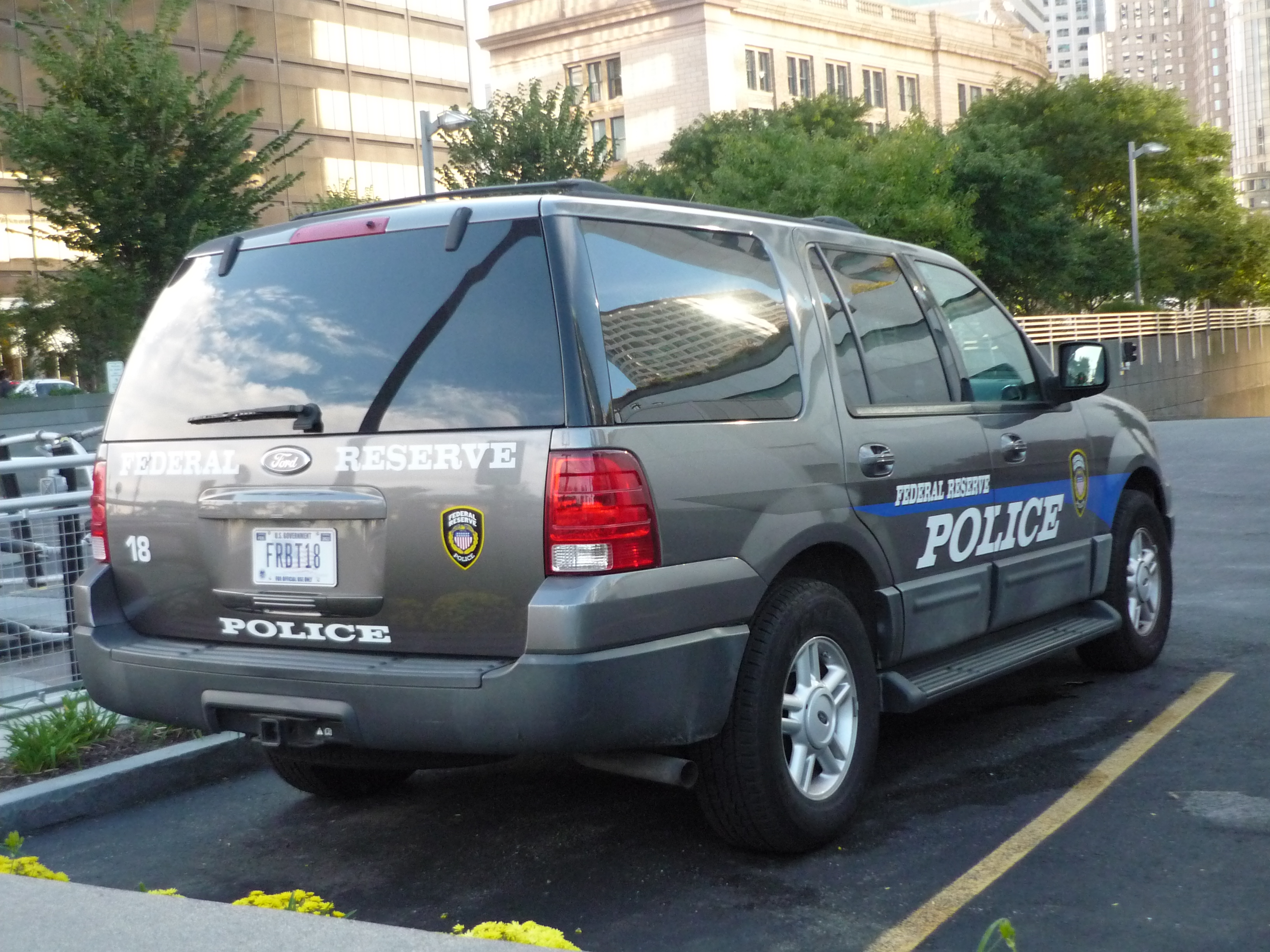
A Ford Expedition of Federal Reserve Police, near Boston Federal Reserve Bank.

== Line of Duty Deaths ==
Since the establishment of the Federal Reserve Police Department, two officers have been killed in the line of duty.

Rank	Officer	Date of death	Details
Special Officer	Charles T. Linton	December 18, 1922	Shot dead during bank robbery
Captain	Earl R. Compton	February 29, 1972	Shot dead intentionally by disgruntled police officer

K9 LODD:

- K9 Remi EOW - January 13, 2014.

== See also ==
- List of United States federal law enforcement agencies
- United States Mint Police

== General sources ==
- Federal Reserve Police Accreditation (FLETA)
- Federal Reserve Police and other Federal Agencies FLETA Accreditation
- Federal Reserve Police Recruiting page
