= Fort Sumner Municipal Schools =

School district in New Mexico, United States

Fort Sumner Municipal Schools is a school district headquartered in Fort Sumner, New Mexico. It consists of three schools: Fort Sumner Elementary School, Fort Sumner Middle School, and Fort Sumner High School.

Its boundary parallels that of De Baca County.

== History ==
In 2004 there were allegations that some students were never given the tests that the state of New Mexico required.

In August 2011 the district installed a geothermal heating system in the district's gymnasium. The district considered removing its original heating and cooling systems from other buildings but determined that changing them to geothermal would not significantly benefit the district.

== Campus ==
There is a 20,000-square-foot (1,900 m^{2}) building called The Fort. It opened in 2009; no prior building had been built on the property since 1959.

The gymnasium has 30,000 square feet (2,800 m^{2}) of space.
