= Flying H Ranch =

- U.S. National Register of Historic Places
- Location within New Mexico Location within the United States
- Location: Off U.S. Route 70 between Hope and Elk Area, near Roswell, New Mexico
- Coordinates: 33°00′41″N 105°08′22″W
- Area: 15 acres (6.1 ha)
- Architectural style: New Mexico vernacular
- MPS: Roswell New Mexico MRA
- NRHP reference No.: 85003633
- Added to NRHP: September 14, 1988

The Flying H Ranch, near Roswell, New Mexico, was listed on the National Register of Historic Places in 1988. The listing included 10 contributing buildings on four discontinuous areas.

Billy the Kid worked on the ranch, and it includes a dugout where Billy the Kid hid later.

It is located off U.S. Route 70 between Hope and Elk Area.

It includes New Mexico vernacular architecture.

It includes:

- the James J. Dolan House (early 1890s), a one-story L-shaped building of adobe covered with clapboard, built by James J. Dolan.
- the Clement Hendricks House (c.1929), an adobe house enlarged from a pre-existing adobe dwelling. It has a stepped parapet.
- more

A home of Pat Garrett, the Patrick Floyd Garrett House, not too far away, is separate, and is also listed on the National Register.
