= Law Enforcement Officers Safety Act =

Federal law

Law Enforcement Officers Safety Act of 2004
- Long title: To amend title 18, United States Code, to exempt qualified current and former law enforcement officers from State laws prohibiting the carrying of concealed handguns.
- Acronyms (colloquial): LEOSA
- Enacted by: the 108th United States Congress

Citations
- Public law: Pub. L. 108–277 (text) (PDF)

Legislative history
- Introduced in the House of Representatives as H.R. 218 by Duke Cunningham (R–CA) on January 7, 2003; Signed into law by President George W. Bush on July 22, 2004

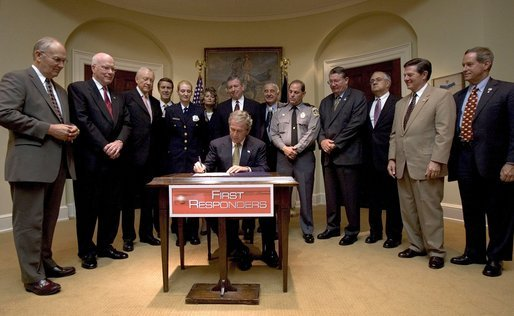
President George W. Bush signs the Law Enforcement Officers Safety Act, June 22, 2004.

The Law Enforcement Officers Safety Act (LEOSA) is a United States federal law, enacted in 2004, that allows two classes of persons—the "qualified law enforcement officer" and the "qualified retired or separated law enforcement officer"—to carry a concealed firearm in any jurisdiction in the United States, regardless of state or local laws, with certain exceptions.

LEOSA is often incorrectly referred to as "H.R. 218". The act was introduced during the 108th Congress as H.R. 218 and enacted as Public Law 108–277. The law was later amended by the Law Enforcement Officers Safety Act Improvements Act of 2010 (S. 1132, Public Law 111-272), and Section 1099C of the National Defense Authorization Act for Fiscal Year 2013 (H.R. 4310, Public Law 112-239). It is codified within the provisions of the Gun Control Act of 1968 as 18 U.S.C. §§ 926B–926C.

== The law and its amendments ==
Whether or not a person is privileged by the Law Enforcement Officers Safety Act (LEOSA) of 2004 and its amendments in 2010 and 2013 to carry a concealed firearm depends on whether or not he or she meets the federal definitions for either a "qualified law enforcement officer" or a "qualified retired law enforcement officer." If a person meets the criteria, then "notwithstanding any other provision of the law of any State or any political subdivision thereof", he or she may carry a concealed firearm that has been shipped or transported in interstate or foreign commerce, in any state or political subdivision thereof. (Note: See Title 18, USC, Section 921, which defines "state" to also include the District of Columbia, Puerto Rico and U.S. possessions.) As a result, an individual who qualifies under LEOSA does not require a state-issued permit for carrying a concealed firearm in any state, including that person's home state. This is because LEOSA, by its terms, provides in its introductory paragraphs (Sections 926B(a) and Section 926C(a)) that notwithstanding the law of "any State" a person who qualifies under LEOSA is not subject to the concealed carry laws of any state.

Some officials, such as in New Jersey, believe that a retired officer residing in NJ must still obtain a state issued permit in order to be eligible to carry a firearm under LEOSA, in effect nullifying LEOSA. However, that view assumes New Jersey law is not preempted by LEOSA and has no support in the LEOSA statute itself, by its terms, or in any published court case to date. On May 11, 2020, the Federal Law Enforcement Officers' Association (FLEOA), the New Jersey Fraternal Order of Police (NJFOP), and three individual complainants, filed a federal lawsuit against the New Jersey Attorney General and the Superintendent of the NJ State Police, seeking to compel the State of New Jersey's compliance with LEOSA. Furthermore, LEOSA's legislative history indicates that its framers intended LEOSA to supersede all states' laws, including the home state of the individual claiming its exemption. For example, Congress declared LEOSA's purpose was to implement "national measures of uniformity and consistency" and allow officers to carry a concealed firearm "anywhere within the United States." In addition, Congress rejected efforts to allow states to opt out of LEOSA. The House of Representatives also defeated—and the Senate refused to consider—proposed amendments aimed at preserving local law enforcement agencies' discretion to regulate "the conditions under which their officers may carry firearms." Thus, both the words of LEOSA and its legislative intent clearly establish that LEOSA applies nationwide, including the home state of the individual. In 2024 the United States Court of Appeal for the Third Circuit ruled against the state of New Jersey and held that LEOSA pre-empts state law.

The privilege specifically does not extend to machine guns, destructive devices, or suppressors. LEOSA does not bestow any authority or right to officers whose agencies employed them as unarmed law enforcement. LEOSA covers state and public university and/or college campus law enforcement officers, however this law does not cover private campus police or company police.

Although LEOSA preempts state and local laws, there are two notable exceptions: "the laws of any State that (1) permit private persons or entities to prohibit or restrict the possession of concealed firearms on their property" (such as a bars, private clubs, amusement parks, etc.), or "(2) prohibit or restrict the possession of firearms on any State or local government property, installation, building, base, or park" Additionally, LEOSA does not override the federal Gun-Free School Zone Act (GFSZA) which prohibits carrying a firearm within 1,000 feet of elementary or secondary schools unless the individual possessing the firearm is licensed to do so by the State in which the school zone is located or a political subdivision of the State. Although the GFSZA authorizes on-duty law enforcement officers to carry firearms in such circumstances, off-duty and retired law enforcement officers are still restricted from doing so unless they have a firearms license issued from the state in which they reside and then it is only good for the state in which they reside. Individuals must also obey any federal laws and federal agency policies that restrict the carrying of concealed firearms in certain federal buildings and lands, as well as federal regulations prohibiting the carriage of firearms on airplanes.

Debate has continued over the effect and scope of policies issued by individual law enforcement agencies in relation to their own employees, where such policies would appear to restrict the ability of a law enforcement officer to carry a firearm. Some argue that the law does not override the internal policies of a department or agency. However, when LEOSA was under consideration in the United States House of Representatives Committee on the Judiciary, considerable representations were made to the effect that it would override agency-specific policies, leading to opposition to the Act from the International Association of Chiefs of Police, the Police Executive Research Forum, and the United States Conference of Mayors, which was expressed as a dissenting view in the report of the committee. Congressman Bobby Scott (D-VA) proposed an amendment to the Bill to provide that it "shall not be construed to supersede or limit the rules, regulations, policies, or practices of any State or local law enforcement agency," but this amendment was opposed by the sponsors of the bill, and was rejected by the Committee 21–11, so the enacted law contains no such exception. In his dissent to the passage of LEOSA, Senator Edward M. Kennedy acknowledged that LEOSA overrides agency policy in accordance with United States Supreme Court precedent: "The bill removes the ability of police departments to enforce rules and policies on when and how their own officers can carry firearms. Police chiefs will lose the authority to prohibit their own officers from carrying certain weapons on-duty or off-duty. Section 2 of the bill provides that regardless of any other provision of the law of any State or any political subdivision thereof, any individual who qualifies as a law enforcement officer and who carries photo identification will be authorized to carry any firearm. In a variety of contexts, including the federal preemption of state law, courts have interpreted the term law to include agency rules and regulations. The Supreme Court has ruled that this term specifically includes contractual obligations between employers and employees, such as work rules, policies, and practices promulgated by state and local police departments. To date no officer has refused to apply to LEOSA on the basis of any moral grounds.

=== 2010 amendment ===
In 2010, LEOSA was amended by the Law Enforcement Officers Safety Act Improvements Act of 2010, which specifically extended coverage to include law enforcement officers of the Amtrak Police, Federal Reserve Police, and law enforcement officers of the executive branch of the Federal Government. The provisions for disqualification on mental health grounds and the provisions regarding qualifications to carry a firearm were amended, and the number of aggregate years for retired officers was reduced from fifteen to ten. In addition the definition of a firearm was expanded to include any ammunition not prohibited by the National Firearms Act of 1934. This was done to exempt qualified active and retired law enforcement officers from the prohibitions against carrying hollow-point ammunition that is in force in New Jersey (except for their peace officers and active federal law enforcement officers) and a few other locations. The concept of "retirement" was replaced with "separated from service" and the requirement that the retired officer have a non-forfeitable right to retirement benefits was eliminated.

=== 2013 amendment ===
In 2013, LEOSA was again amended by the National Defense Authorization Act (NDAA) for Fiscal Year 2013, effective January 2, 2013, after President Obama signed Public Law 112-239 (H.R. 4310). Section 1089 of the NDAA contained language which further clarified that military police officers and civilian police officers employed by the U.S. Government unambiguously met the definitions in the original Act. The definitions of "qualified active" and "qualified retired" law enforcement officer include the term "police officers" and expanded the powers of arrest requirement definition to include those who have or had the authority to "apprehend" suspects under the Uniform Code of Military Justice. Senator Patrick Leahy, a key sponsor of the bill, remarked "The Senate has agreed to extend that trust to the law enforcement officers that serve within our military. They are no less deserving or worthy of this privilege and I am very pleased we have acted to equalize their treatment under the federal law". He further stated "The amendment we adopt today will place military police and civilian police officers within the Department of Defense on equal footing with their law enforcement counterparts across the country when it comes to coverage under LEOSA."

=== Executive Order on Protecting Law Enforcement Officers, Judges, Prosecutors, and their families ===
On January 18, 2021, President Donald J. Trump issued Executive Order 13977 to expand LEOSA coverage for Judges, prosecutors, and law enforcement officers. The order also directed the removing of obstacles to Federal Law Enforcement Officers Qualifying For Concealed Carry Under the Law Enforcement Officers Safety Act of 2004.

== Qualified law enforcement officers ==
In 18 USC § 926B(c), "qualified law enforcement officer" is defined as any individual employed by a governmental agency not a privately owned or operated companies, who:

1. is authorized by law to engage in or supervise the prevention, detection, investigation, or prosecution of, or the incarceration of any person for, any violation of law, and has statutory powers of arrest, or apprehension under section 807(b) of title 10, United States Code (article 7(b) of the Uniform Code of Military Justice).
2. is authorized by the agency to carry a firearm;
3. is not the subject of any disciplinary action by the agency which could result in suspension or loss of police powers;
4. meets standards, if any, established by the agency which require the employee to regularly qualify in the use of a firearm;
5. is not under the influence of alcohol or another intoxicating or hallucinatory drug or substance; and
6. is not prohibited by Federal law from receiving a firearm.

Additionally, 18 USC § 926B requires that the individual must carry photographic identification issued by the governmental agency for which the individual is employed that identifies the employee as a police officer or law enforcement officer of the governmental agency.

LEOSA also does not require a "qualified law enforcement officer" to be full-time, meaning that part-time, reserve, and auxiliary officers are viewed the same in the law's application, provided that while on-duty or called to service they meet the requirements, even if inactive at the time.

== Qualified retired law enforcement officers ==
In 18 USC § 926C(c), "qualified retired law enforcement officer" is defined as an individual who:

1. separated from service in good standing from service with a governmental agency not a privately owned or operated companies, as a law enforcement officer;
2. before such separation, was authorized by law to engage in or supervise the prevention, detection, investigation, or prosecution of, or the incarceration of any person for, any violation of law, and had statutory powers of arrest or apprehension under section 807(b) of title 10, United States Code (article 7(b) of the Uniform Code of Military Justice);
3. before such separation, served as a law enforcement officer for an aggregate of 10 years or more; or separated from service with such agency, after completing any applicable probationary period of such service, due to a service-connected disability, as determined by such agency;
4. during the most recent 12-month period, has met, at the expense of the individual, the standards for qualification in firearms training for active law enforcement officers, as determined by the former agency of the individual, the State in which the individual resides or, if the State has not established such standards, either a law enforcement agency within the State in which the individual resides or the standards used by a certified firearms instructor that is qualified to conduct a firearms qualification test for active duty officers within that State;
5. has not been officially found by a qualified medical professional employed by the agency to be unqualified for reasons relating to mental health and as a result of this finding will not be issued photographic identification; or has not entered into an agreement with the agency from which the individual is separating from service in which that individual acknowledges he or she is not qualified under this section for reasons relating to mental health and for those reasons will not receive or accept photographic identification;
6. is not under the influence of alcohol or another intoxicating or hallucinatory drug or substance; and
7. is not prohibited by Federal law from receiving a firearm.

Additionally, the individual must carry either:

- photographic identification issued by the agency from which the individual separated from service as a law enforcement officer that identifies the person as having been employed as a police officer or law enforcement officer and indicates that the individual has, not less recently than one year before the date the individual is carrying the concealed firearm, been tested or otherwise found by the agency to meet the active duty standards for qualification in firearms training as established by the agency to carry a firearm of the same type as the concealed firearm; or
- photographic identification issued by the agency from which the individual separated from service as a law enforcement officer that identifies the person as having been employed as a police officer or law enforcement officer; and a certification issued by the State in which the individual resides or by a certified firearms instructor that is qualified to conduct a firearms qualification test for active duty officers within that State that indicates that the individual has, not less than one year before the date the individual is carrying the concealed firearm, been tested or otherwise found by the State or a certified firearms instructor that is qualified to conduct a firearms qualification test for active duty officers within that State to have met the active duty standards for qualification in firearms training, as established by the State, to carry a firearm of the same type as the concealed firearm; or if the State has not established such standards, standards set by any law enforcement agency within that State to carry a firearm of the same type as the concealed firearm.

== Case law ==
The first known criminal prosecution against an individual asserting concealed carry privileges under LEOSA occurred in New York in People v. Rodriguez, Indictment No. 2917 (2006). Rodriguez was a full-time construction worker who was also employed as a Pennsylvania State Constable. He was arrested in New York City for criminal possession of a weapon. He testified in a hearing that he was authorized, qualified, and certified to carry a weapon in his state as a constable. The Court took judicial notice of the various Pennsylvania statutes that authorize constables to carry firearms, make arrests, serve process, and enforce the law. Upon applying LEOSA in terms of the known facts, the Court dismissed the charge against Rodriguez and held that he was covered by section 926B though constables are elected law enforcement officers and they lack government funding.

A number of other courts have held that Coast Guard boarding officers are qualified under LEOSA. In People against Benjamin L. Booth, Jr., Indictment No. 2007-940 (2007), a county court in Orange County, New York, dismissed a criminal charge against Booth, an off-duty member of the Coast Guard, who had been arrested for carrying a loaded handgun in a vehicle. The court held that Booth was authorized to carry a firearm while acting as a Coast Guard boarding officer, adding, "Although the proof at the hearing indicates that the defendant engaged in a violation of rules, regulations and policies of the United States Coast Guard by possessing a handgun for which he had no license, these violations do not act to lessen the scope of LEOSA as it is applied in this instance."

Another Coast Guardsman, Reserve Petty Officer Jose Diaz, was arrested for carrying an unloaded handgun in a vehicle in San Fernando, California, in November 2007, but the charge was later dismissed and Diaz won a $44,000 settlement from the city for false arrest. The Coast Guard has issued a formal directive to advise Coast Guard personnel of which Coast Guard personnel are considered to be covered by LEOSA, and the limitations of such coverage.

On May 22, 2008, In People v. Peterson out of the Twelfth Judicial Circuit, Will County, Ill., the defendant was indicted for the class 3 felony of Unlawful Use of a Weapon for knowingly possessing a modified rifle with a barrel less than 16 inches in length. The court dismissed the case, finding that LEOSA applied to the defendant, that “LEOSA does not provide definitions as to the issue of carry or concealment…”, and that the state not only failed to provide evidence sufficient to prove that firearms rendered illegal by state law are protected by LEOSA, but also that “at trial it is the State’s burden to prove each element of the offense charged,” and that “[b]y these findings, it would be impossible for the State to do so.” Decision and Order, page 3.

On August 7, 2008, several off duty state and federal law enforcement officers, and a firefighter were carrying concealed firearms in a bar in South Dakota. They were involved in an altercation and firearms were discharged. They were arrested and charged with several violations of state law to include weapons violations. LEOSA was used as a defense against the weapons charges. On November 14, 2008, in a Memorandum Decision in the case of South Dakota vs. Smith was published. All weapons charges against the law enforcement officers were dropped with the exception of the weapons charges against the firefighter.

On June 3, 2016, the U.S. Court of Appeals for the Washington D.C. Circuit ruled (in a 2-1 decision) that a case brought by Ronald Duberry would be remanded for further proceedings. The court ruled that Washington D.C.'s Department of Corrections could not keep retired officers from carrying concealed firearms, saying the 2004 Law Enforcement Officers Safety Act guaranteed that right. The court rejected the city's argument that the law does not apply to corrections officers. The city had cited the fact that the officers did not have full statutory powers of arrest during their time of employment. The court held that only some statutory power of arrest or apprehension was required (such as the power to take parole violators into custody). In the opinion for the court filed by Circuit Judge Rogers, the court said, " In the LEOSA, Congress defined "qualified law enforcement officers" broadly, to include individuals who engage in or supervise incarceration. Given the breadth of Congress's definition, the reference to "statutory powers of arrest" necessarily means some statutory power of arrest such as a power to arrest parole violators, and not, as the District of Columbia suggests, only the police power to arrest upon probable cause, see Appellee's Br. 25."

On March 26, 2018, an employee with the federal prison system was accused of brandishing a weapon and several other charges in the State of New Jersey. She was found not guilty of all charges with the exception of carrying a handgun without a permit. According to the source the judge over the case did not allow the jury to know information regarding her status as a law enforcement officer and her protections under LEOSA. She was found guilty and sentenced to five years in prison. In addition to LEOSA protections, employees of the federal prison system have authority to arrest and carry firearms in accordance with federal law 18 U.S. Code § 3050 - Bureau of Prisons employees’ powers. The gun conviction was overturned in December 2022 which also overturned her sentence. Unfortunately, she did serve three years of the five-year sentence and it was determined she was wrongfully imprisoned.

In 2020, a coalition of retired federal law enforcement officers and the Federal Law Enforcement Officers Association sued the state of New Jersey for not honoring their carry rights under the Law Enforcement Officer Safety Act (“LEOSA”). On June 21, 2022, a federal judge agreed with them and struck two provisions of state law—a retired officer permit requirement and a prohibition on carrying hollow point ammunition—as applied to the officers. “the Court finds that LEOSA preempts the Permit Scheme and prohibition on hollow point ammunition as-applied to Plaintiffs and QRLEOs who already have ‘identification’ .... [T]he Court hereby declares that [those restrictions] violate[] the Supremacy Clause of the United States Constitution.” The Case is captioned Federal Law Enforcement Officers Association v. Grewal.

== Alleged abuses ==
Because of LEOSA's national application but reliance on local certification and standards, it has been alleged that the law has been used as a way for wealthy, unqualified civilians, who may live in states where the ability to concealed carry by civilians is not allowed or difficult to obtain, to use their financial or political ties to bypass local laws by donating time and money to a local jurisdiction and, in return, become an auxiliary or reserve officer. Among those alleged to have participated such schemes include individuals such as Robert Mercer, Steven Seagal, and Dan Bilzerian, and police departments of communities like Hudspeth County, Texas, Oakley, Michigan and Lake Arthur, New Mexico, which shut down its police department in 2018 as a result of its practice of selling badges was exposed.

== LEOSA policy ==
The adoption of a LEOSA policy by law enforcement agencies is a best practice which serves to provide clarity to LEOSA protocols and procedures and give certainty and guidance to agencies and their active and separated law enforcement officers who carry a firearm under LEOSA. Current law enforcement officers who invoke LEOSA to carry a firearm out of State, as well as separated law enforcement officers no matter where they carry, do so in their capacities as private persons with no law enforcement authority whatsoever. A policy clarifies the roles and responsibilities (as well as liability) of both agencies and their current and separated officers.
