= CA Bar Ranch =

- U.S. National Register of Historic Places
- Location within New Mexico
- Nearest city: Mayhill, New Mexico
- Coordinates: 32°53′38″N 105°13′26″W
- Area: less than one acre
- Built: 1886
- MPS: Roswell New Mexico MRA
- NRHP reference No.: 85003634
- Added to NRHP: August 29, 1988

The CA Bar Ranch, in Chaves County, New Mexico near Mayhill, New Mexico, was built in 1886. It was listed on the National Register of Historic Places in 1988.

It is a one-and-a-half-story house built of random ashlar and dressed stone, with exterior walls 2 feet (0.61 m) thick or more. It has fish-scale patterned shingles in its end gables.

It has also been known as the James Fielding Hinkle House. It was built by and for James Hinkle, who later built a home in Roswell, New Mexico in 1906, which is a contributing building in the Downtown Roswell Historic District.

In 1988, it was part of a working cattle ranch.

It is located on U.S. Route 82 about 3 miles (4.8 km) west of its junction with New Mexico State Road 24.
