= Ozark Trails Marker at Lake Arthur =

- U.S. National Register of Historic Places
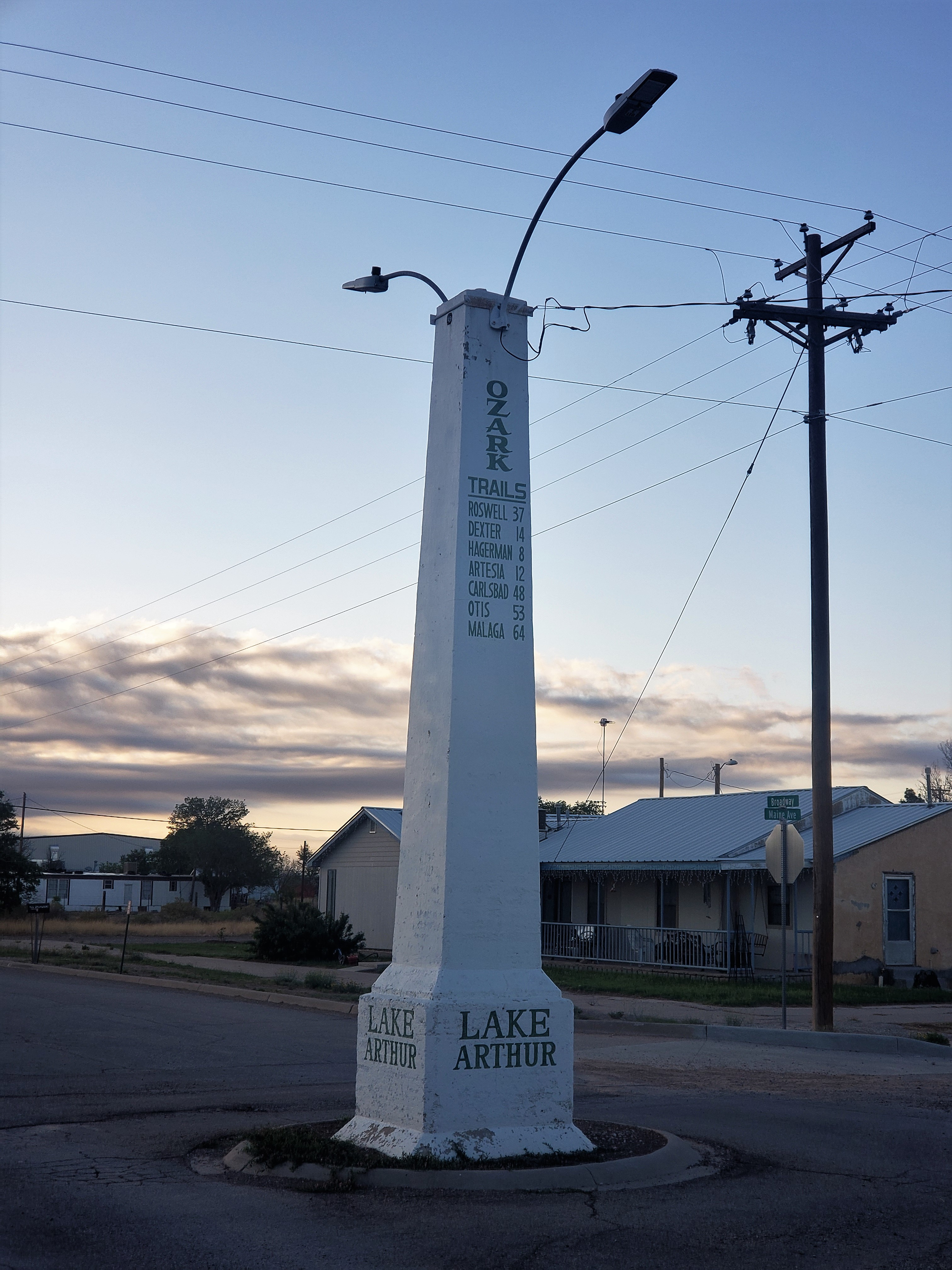

- Location within New Mexico
- Location: Jct. of Main and Broadway Sts., Lake Arthur, New Mexico
- Coordinates: 32.998118°N 104.365803°W
- Area: less than one acre
- Built: 1921
- Built by: Matheson, Hendrickson & Brown
- NRHP reference No.: 04000702
- Added to NRHP: July 16, 2004

The Ozark Trails Marker at Lake Arthur, in Lake Arthur, New Mexico, was built in 1921. It is located at the junction of Main and Broadway Streets in Lake Arthur. It was listed on the National Register of Historic Places in 2004.

It is a 21 feet (6.4 m) tall obelisk, erected by Artesia, New Mexico contractors Matheson, Hendrickson & Brown for $250.

It was one of eight markers in New Mexico's portion of the trail. Some of the others were deemed road hazards and were removed.

It recognizes the Ozark Trail, an early roadway supported by state-level automobile associations.
