= Crosby House (Tumwater, Washington) =

Historic home in Tumwater, Washington

- Crosby House Museum, Nathaniel Crosby III House
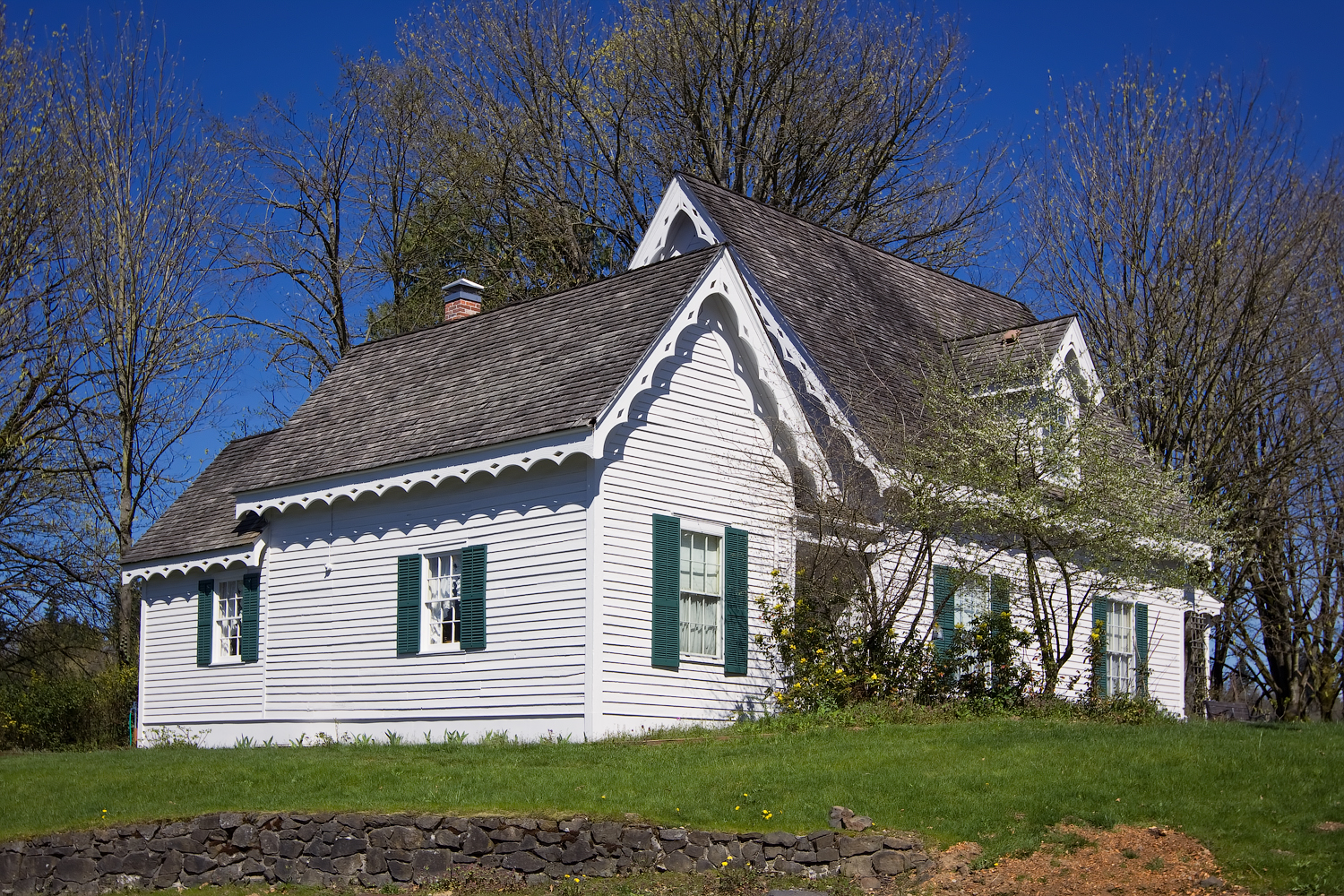
- Crosby House, 2012

- Location within Washington (state) Location within the United States
- 47°01′14″N 122°54′19″W
- Etymology: After Nathaniel and Cordelia Jane Crosby
- Location: 702 Deschutes Way N, Tumwater, Washington

History
- Built: 1858

Site notes
- Height: 1 1/2-stories
- Architectural styles: Greek architecture, Gothic revival architecture, Carpenter Gothic
- Restored: 2007, 2014, 2024
- Current use: Museum
- Owner: City of Tumwater
- Management: Daughters of the Pioneers of Washington
- Website: City of Tumwater - Crosby House

U.S. National Register of Historic Places
- Designated: May 22, 1978
- Part of: Tumwater Historic District
- Reference no.: 78002782

The Crosby House, also known as the Crosby House Museum, (Note: The home is also referred to as the Nathaniel Crosby III House, usually in historical documentation sourcing. For differences to the title of the property, see sources throughout the article.) is a historic house and museum in Tumwater, Washington. Built in 1858, the home is listed as part of the Tumwater Historic District designation on the National Register of Historic Places.

The 1 1/2-story home is noted to contain several styles including Greek architecture, Gothic revival architecture, and Carpenter Gothic. Alterations have been limited, with the closure of a back porch in the 1940s, remodeling of the front porch, and the addition of a kitchen and bathroom. The house contains a parlor, three bedrooms, and a staircase with a handrail believed to have been created out of a single branch of a yew tree.

Due to vibrations caused by traffic on nearby Interstate 5, and in combination with loamy soil and a lack of a foundation, the Crosby House began settling into the ground in the late 1950s. Structural damages were noted which further increased in the 1980s. A restoration and stabilization project spanning from 2007 into 2008 included the construction of a concrete foundation. Additional work to improve the support of the floors were undertaken in 2014 and 2024.

== History ==
The house was built in 1858 (Note: Sources, particularly since the late 20th century, tend to refer to the establishment date of the Crosby House as taking place around 1860. See sources in the article for the discrepancy.) by Nathaniel Crosby III and Cordelia Jane (Smith) Crosby, grandparents of Bing Crosby. The Crosby family, reported to be 24 people, had originally migrated from Maine to Tumwater in 1849. The Crosby House is the oldest residence in Tumwater, one of the oldest in Washington state, and along with the Henderson House, one of two existing homes from the original settlement of "old Tumwater".

The Crosbys lived in the home until 1872 when they sold the property to Dr. Nathaniel Ostrander. The house was occupied by multiple owners into the 1940s where it was placed in a trust overseen by a local attorney, William Manier. Descendants of the Crosby family, along with the Schmidt family of the Olympia Brewing Company purchased the house in 1947, where it was subsequently donated that year to a local chapter of the Daughters of the Pioneers of Washington (DPW). The house, which also serves as a local repository known as the Crosby House Museum, was deeded by the DPW to the city of Tumwater in 1981; as part of the agreement, as long as the Daughter's chapter exists, the group is to have a life estate interest in the property. The city owns the property and the museum portion is overseen by the DPW.

In 2001, a Tumwater miniaturist, Linda Olson, created a "scale-replica" Christmas tree ornament of the Crosby House that was displayed on the White House Christmas tree in 2001.

The Crosby residence was closed in 2020 due to the Covid-19 pandemic and officially reopened in April 2026 for free tours after extensive repairs and renovations were completed.

=== Restoration and stabilization efforts ===
The Crosby House lacked a standard foundation since its construction which led to a settling of the residence in the unstable, sandy loam soil on the property. The settling was further exacerbated by vibrations caused by traffic since Interstate 5 was constructed near the home in 1958. The sagging led to structural damages which were noted to have accelerated due to increased vibrations in 1986 after the construction of a northbound ramp for the highway; plaster on the interior walls began to crack.

The earliest restoration and repair effort to offset the damages included structural repairs in the attic as well as foundation footings. A structural report followed in 2002 which detailed a more extensive need for additional repairs and foundation work.

A renovation project, reported to have cost $192,000 (equivalent to $298,122 in 2025), added a concrete foundation to the home; the efforts began in 2007 and the foundation was completed in January 2008. During inspections before the efforts began, the home was noted to be lacking a load bearing front beam; the component was added during the project. Additional repairs or renovations during the stabilization project included a new chimney, floor patching, the addition of a new front porch, the replacement of rotted beams, and the pour of a new sidewalk. (Note: Despite numerous non-stabilization work during the 2007 project, Tumwater's planning and facilities manager at the time stated that the efforts were "not necessarily a restoration project".)

Continuing efforts to repair the damages to the floor structure were completed in 2014. Floor joists and other support components were rotted and repairs were undertaken beginning in 2024. Due to the historical value of the joists, the beams were kept but attached to new work. The $106,000 project also included new concrete piers and support posts.

As of 2026, future repair needs include a new roof and gutter system, as well as remodeling of the interior.

== Geography ==
The Crosby House and museum is located in Tumwater, Washington at 702 Deschutes Way N. The home is also located very near the interchange of Interstate 5 and U.S. Route 101.

== Architecture and features ==
Unless otherwise noted, the details provided are based on the 1978 National Register of Historic Places (NRHP) nomination form for the Tumwater Historic District and may not reflect updates or changes to the Crosby House in the interim.

=== Exterior ===
Main entrance, east

The 1 1/2-story residence is noted to contain Greek architecture style, seen in the sidelights and transom window at the front entrance. The house is mostly designed in Gothic revival architecture, also referred to as Carpenter Gothic. (Note: The NRHP nomination form also refers to the style of the home as Classical revival architecture and describes the residence as a cottage.) The Crosby House is one of a few residences in the state that features a combination of Greek and Gothic revival styles.

Wood used in the construction of the home is suspected to be most likely from the sawmill of Clanrick Crosby. The exterior frame of the residence was constructed using a doubled-up system of 1 in × 12 in (25 mm × 305 mm) boards that required no studwork.

The first floor of the main entrance-side, facing east, is sheathed in flushboard siding; lap siding is located on the remaining exterior walls. The building contains a steep main roof, as well as a dormer roof, that are detailed with scalloped verge-board; the detail which also contains a raking cornice, was most likely added in the 1880s.

At the time of the historic nomination, the windows were noted to be six-over-six with cornice details.

=== Interior ===
Entrance hall staircase

The home originally had three bedrooms and lacks closets. (Note: The NRHP nomination form lists the home to have contained four bedrooms by 1977.) A nursery is suspected to have been located in the home; the space was converted into a storage room. On the first floor, the Crosby House contains a dining room, kitchen, and a parlor with a fireplace. A narrow stairway at the entryway leads to the second floor bedrooms; the hand rail of the stairs may have been constructed out of one branch of a yew tree.

The interior was decorated by the Daughters of the Pioneers with fixtures and furniture from the era of Abraham Lincoln. An original rocker chair and table of the Crosbys were noted to be located in the home during the NRHP nomination.

=== Alterations ===
Alterations of the home have been reported to be minor. A back porch had been closed in 1947 and a balustrade had been removed from the front porch. The flat roof of the front porch was replaced with a shed roof that contained vergeboard trim. A kitchen and bathroom were added during renovations by the Daughters of the Pioneers in the mid-20th century.

=== Extinct features ===
The grounds once contained a pioneer garden; the feature was removed to address renovations of the home's foundation and structural issues in the 21st century.

== Recognition ==
The Crosby House was listed to the Tumwater Register of Historic Places in 1995 and added to the Washington State Register of Historic Places in 1969. The home is part of the Tumwater Historic District listing on the National Register of Historic Places.
