= Louise Massey House =

- U.S. National Register of Historic Places
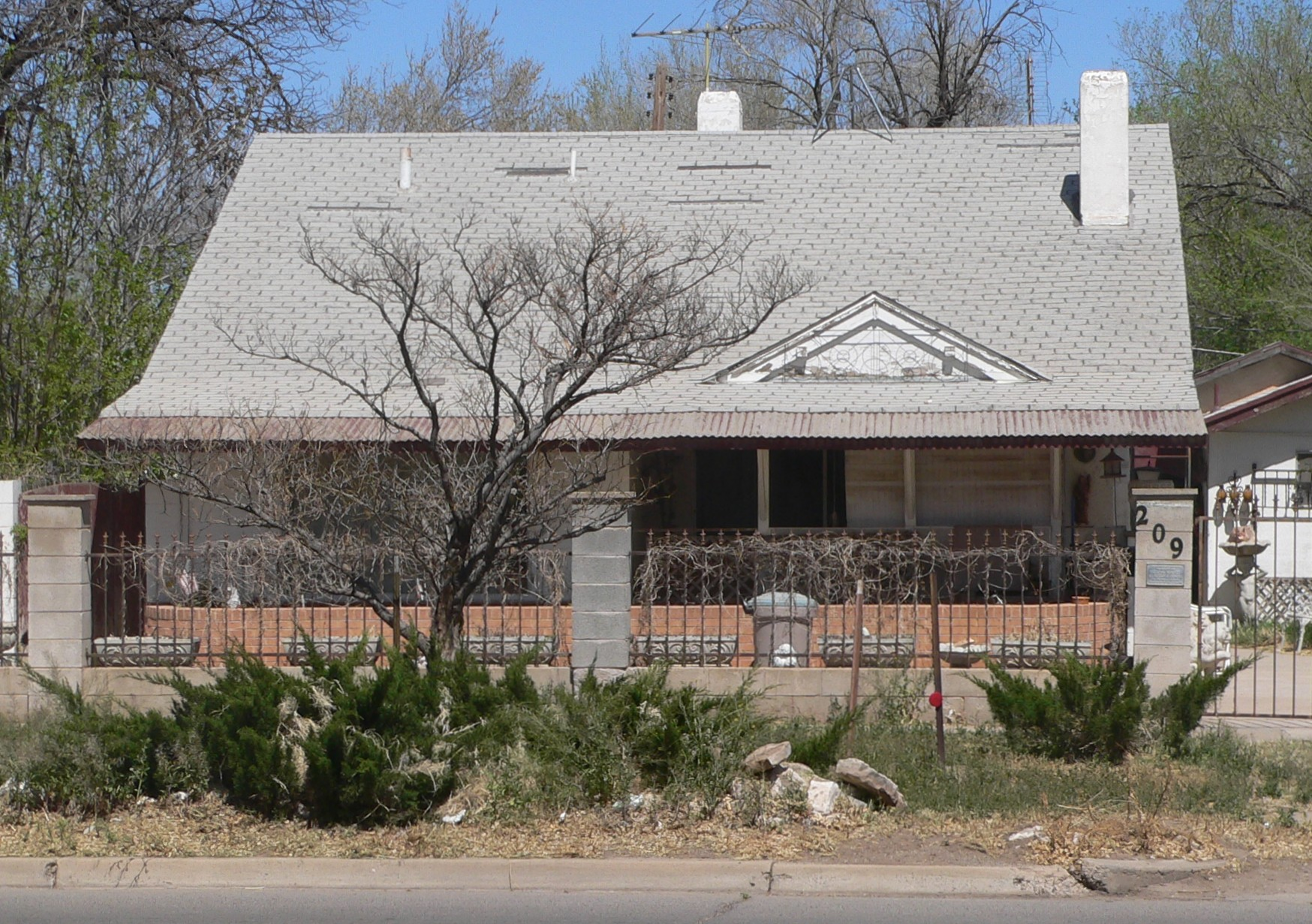

- Location within New Mexico
- Location: 209 W. Alameda St., Roswell, New Mexico
- Coordinates: 33°23′28″N 104°31′32″W
- Area: less than one acre
- Built: 1928
- Architectural style: Gable with Box
- MPS: Roswell New Mexico MRA
- NRHP reference No.: 85001544
- Added to NRHP: May 16, 1985

The Louise Massey House, at 209 W. Alameda St. in Roswell, New Mexico, was a home of country singer Louise Massey (1902-1983) during 1918 to 1982. The house was built in 1928 and was listed on the National Register of Historic Places in 1985.

It was in this house in 1928 that "Louise Massey and her husband, Milt Mabie, her two brothers, Curt and Alien, were interviewed for their first professional singing job as "The Westerners" by the Red Path Chatauqua. By 1930 they had a five year contract on CBS Radio in Kansas City. Later they joined WLS National Barn Dance. By 1938 Louise Massey was a star solo singer with the Westerners and with other shows on NBC Radio Programs in N.Y. City. Louise's 1934 recording of "When the White Azaleas are Blooming" sold three million copies and earned her a lifetime recording contract with Columbia Records. In 1940 Louise and Milt bought a ranch on the Hondo River, but retained her previous residence as a second home. Louise wrote her most famous song "In My Adobe Hacienda" which was her biggest hit single recording in this house. In 1945 she retired and lived with her husband on Hondo Ranch. After Milt's death in 1973 and due to failing health, Louise spent her last years in this home in Roswell and in various nursing homes. Louise died in June, 1983."
