= Milne-Bush Ranch =

- U.S. National Register of Historic Places
- Location within New Mexico
- Location: Rt. 1, Roswell, New Mexico
- Coordinates: 33°26′19″N 104°29′55″W
- Area: less than one acre
- Architectural style: New Mexico vernacular
- MPS: Roswell New Mexico MRA
- NRHP reference No.: 85003639
- Added to NRHP: August 29, 1988

The Milne-Bush Ranch, on Rt. 1 in or near Roswell, New Mexico, was listed on the National Register of Historic Places in 1988. The listing included two contributing buildings. It has also been known as Ave de Paso.

The historic resources are a one-story adobe house and a two-story barn about 200 feet (61 m) away. The house started as a one-room adobe homestead around 1884 and was expanded over the years, through the 1920s. It includes "a fireplace and bookshelves hand-carved by artist B.J.O. Nordfeldt who was a member of the Santa Fe art colony from 1918 to 1940.

The barn was built between 1923 and 1926 when the property was used as a hunting lodge. The barn is partly open to a corral.

The architecture is New Mexico vernacular.
