= Urton Orchards =

- U.S. National Register of Historic Places
- Location within New Mexico
- Location: Rt. 3, Roswell, New Mexico
- Coordinates: 33°26′04″N 104°29′10″W
- Area: less than one acre
- Architectural style: Queen Anne
- MPS: Roswell New Mexico MRA
- NRHP reference No.: 85003641
- Added to NRHP: August 29, 1988

Urton Orchards, on Rt. 3 in Roswell, New Mexico, was listed on the National Register of Historic Places in 1988.

It includes a Queen Anne-style house with a turret and a wraparound porch, and a stone milk house. The house was built by Urton in 1900, and he lived there until his death in 1929.

Owners in the 1950s, a dentist and his wife, Walter and Carol McPherson, named the property "Tooth Acres".
