= Goddard House (Worcester, Massachusetts) =

Historic house in Massachusetts, United States

- U.S. National Register of Historic Places
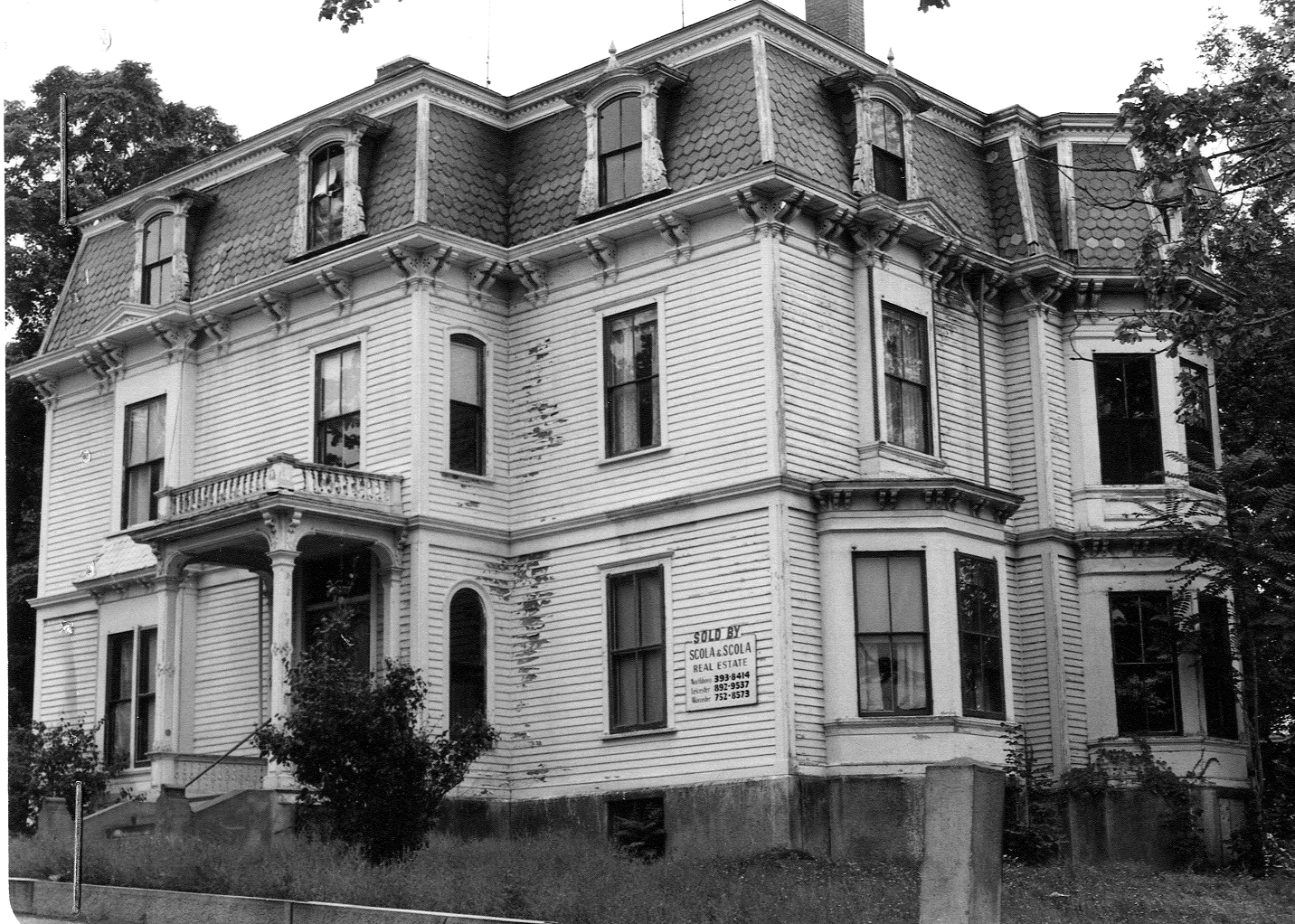
- c. 1977 photo

- Location within Massachusetts Location within the United States
- Location: 12 Catharine St., Worcester, Massachusetts
- Coordinates: 42°16′31″N 71°47′39″W
- Area: less than one acre
- Built: 1870
- Architect: E. Boyden & Son
- Architectural style: Second Empire
- MPS: Worcester MRA
- NRHP reference No.: 80000555
- Added to NRHP: March 05, 1980

The Goddard House was a historic house at 12 Catharine Street in Worcester, Massachusetts. Built in 1870, it was a prominent local example of Second Empire architecture, built for a highly placed manager of a major local firm. The house was listed on the National Register of Historic Places in 1980; it was demolished in 1979.

== Description and history ==
The Goddard House was located northeast of downtown Worcester in its Bell Hill neighborhood, on the south side of Catharine Street at its junction with Oak Street. The site where it stood is now a parking lot for an adjacent Oak Street property. The house was a 2 1/2-story wood-frame structure, with a mansard roof providing a full third floor in the attic level. The roof was dressed with hexagonal slate tiles, with segmented-arch bracketed dormers projecting from the steep roof face. It had asymmetrical massing, and an ornate centered entry porch. Eaves were studded with paired brackets, and the entry porch was topped by a low balustrade.

The house was built in 1870 to a design by local architects E. Boyden & Son. It was built for Henry Goddard, a manager at the Washburn and Moen Wire Works whose father was an early partner in the business. Goddard was employed for his entire career with the company, and probably built this house after he was transferred to the company's North Works. He was also active in local politics, serving multiple terms on the city's common council and board of aldermen.
