= Louise Massey =

American singer and songwriter

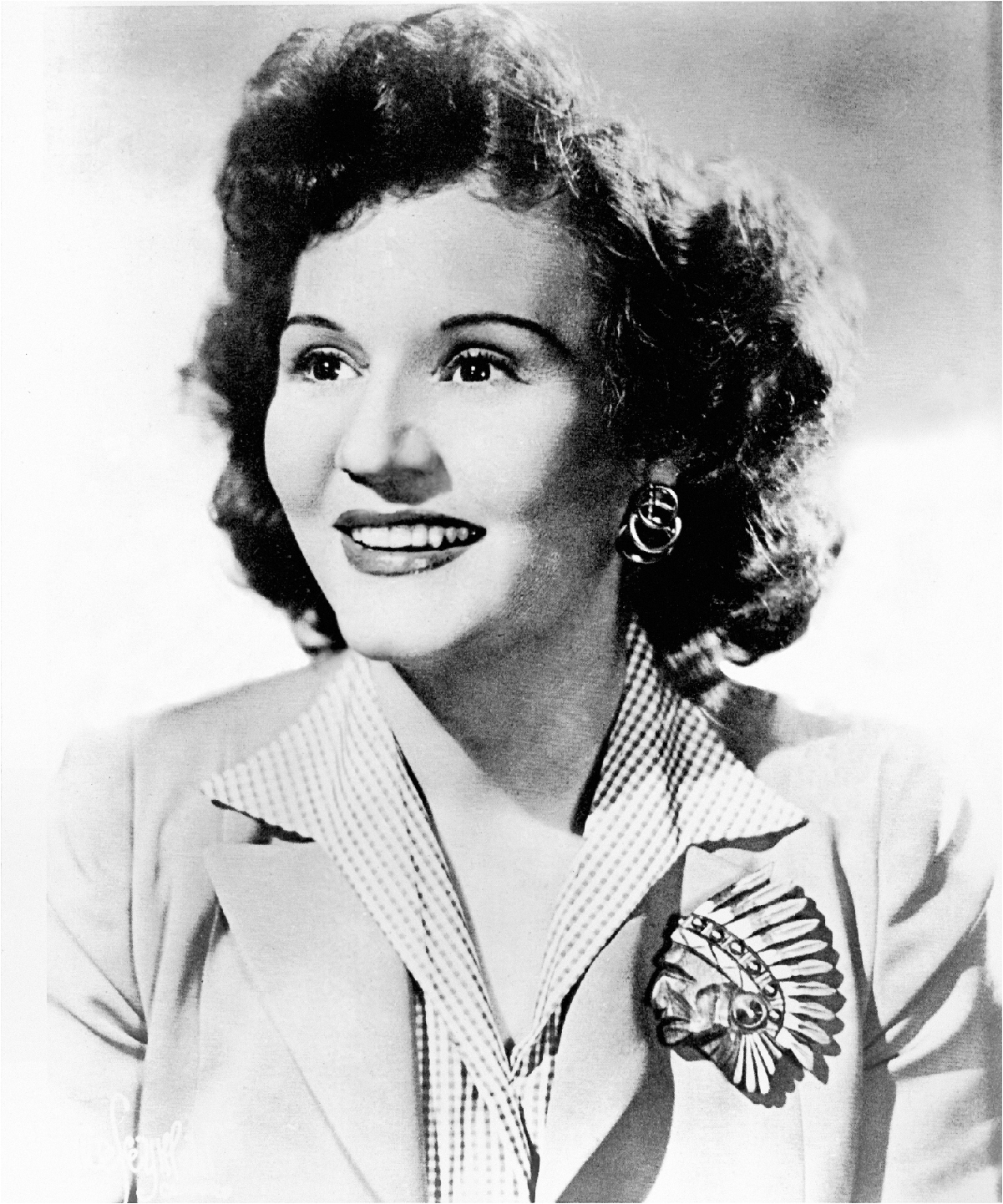
- Born: Victoria Louise Massey; August 10, 1902; Midland, Texas
- Died: June 20, 1983 (aged 80); San Angelo, Texas
- Other name: Victoria Louise Massey Mabie
- Occupations: Singer; songwriter
- Years active: 1918–1950
- Known for: Western music
- Spouse: Milt Mabie

Louise Massey (born Victoria Louise Massey; 10 August 1902 – 20 June 1983) was an American singer and songwriter born in Midland, Texas. The Massey family left Texas while Louise Massey was very young and she grew up near Roswell in Lincoln County, New Mexico. In 1918, Louise's father, Henry Massey, started a band that featured himself and three of his eight children singing and playing musical instruments. Most of the children were able to play several instruments while dressed in “elaborate cowboy outfits as their stage attire,” Louise played piano and sang. The Masseys' music career began in 1920s, when they played and sang at local shows and church socials. At the age of 15, Louise married Milton Mabie, who also joined the group.

In 1930, the quintet known as The Westerners included Louise, Curt and Allen Massey, Milton Mabie, and Larry Wellington, who had replaced Henry Massey. Louise, with her flamboyant Spanish-style costumes, became the focal point of the act and received lead billing. The Westerners' first radio performance was on KMBC in Kansas City. They moved to WLS Radio in Chicago in 1933. In 1934, the song "When the White Azaleas Start Blooming" was released by the band and sold three million copies. In 1936, they moved to New York, where they continued their radio work on NBC. In 1938, Louise Massey and the Westerners appeared in the Tex Ritter film Where the Buffalo Roam. The group returned to WLS Radio in 1939 and did a morning broadcast on NBC called Reveille Roundup.

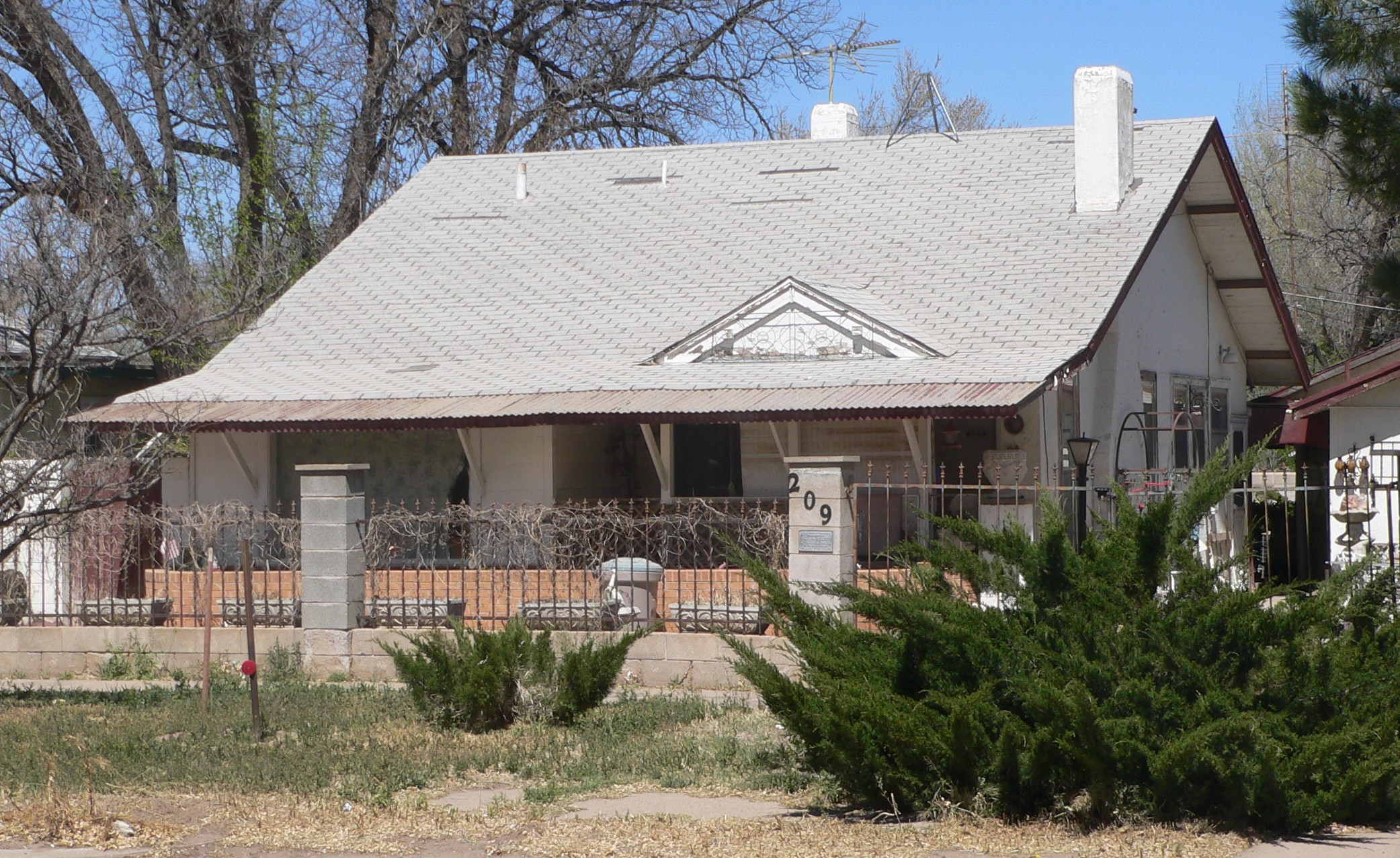
Massey house in Roswell

In the early 1940s, the Westerners were "well known for numerous radio appearances" and were appearing on Plantation Party broadcasts three nights a week. Louise Massey recorded for several record labels including Vocalion Records, OKeh Records, and Conqueror Records.

Massey died in San Angelo, Texas.

Massey's house in Roswell is listed on the National Register of Historic Places.

== Filmography ==
- Twilight on the Trail, 1937
- Love Goes West, 1938
- Where the Buffalo Roam 1938
