= Rio Felix Bridge at Hagerman =

- U.S. National Register of Historic Places
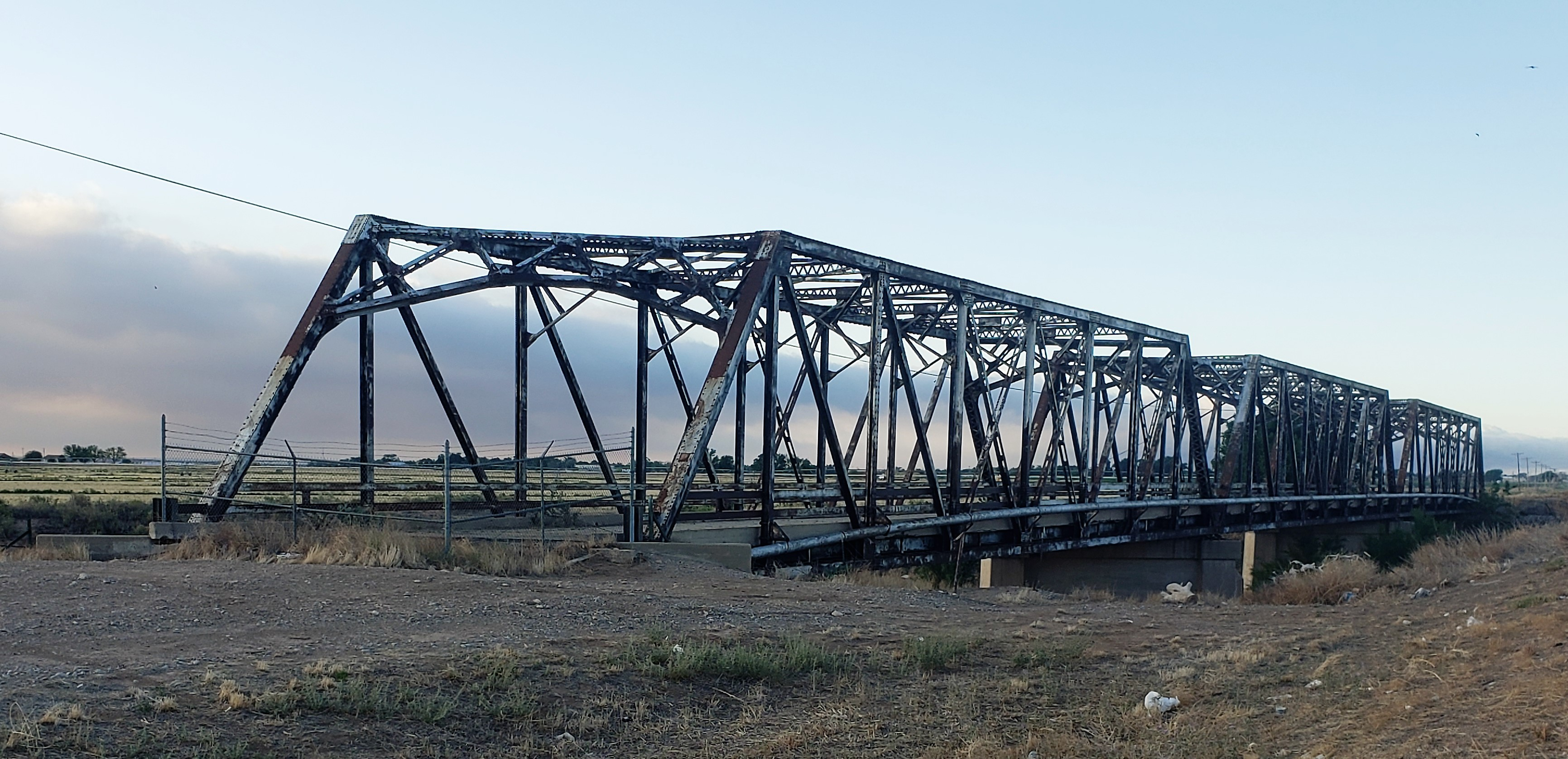

- Location within New Mexico Location within the United States
- Location: New Mexico Highway 2 over Rio Felix, near Hagerman, New Mexico
- Coordinates: 33.131438°N 104.336250°W
- Area: less than one acre
- Built: 1926
- Engineer: William S. Henderson
- Architectural style: Pratt through truss bridge
- MPS: Historic Highway Bridges of New Mexico MPS
- NRHP reference No.: 97000737
- Added to NRHP: July 15, 1997

The Rio Felix Bridge at Hagerman, about one mile from Hagerman, New Mexico, was built in 1926. It was listed on the National Register of Historic Places in 1997.

It is a three-span Pratt through truss bridge, on the former alignment of New Mexico Highway 2, just east of the bridge on the current alignment of the same highway. It brought the highway across the Rio Felix, near that river's confluence with the Pecos River. It rests on two concrete abutments and two concrete piers, with each of the three spans 144 feet (44 m) in length.
