= Crowell–Smith House =

Historic house in Massachusetts, United States

- U.S. National Register of Historic Places
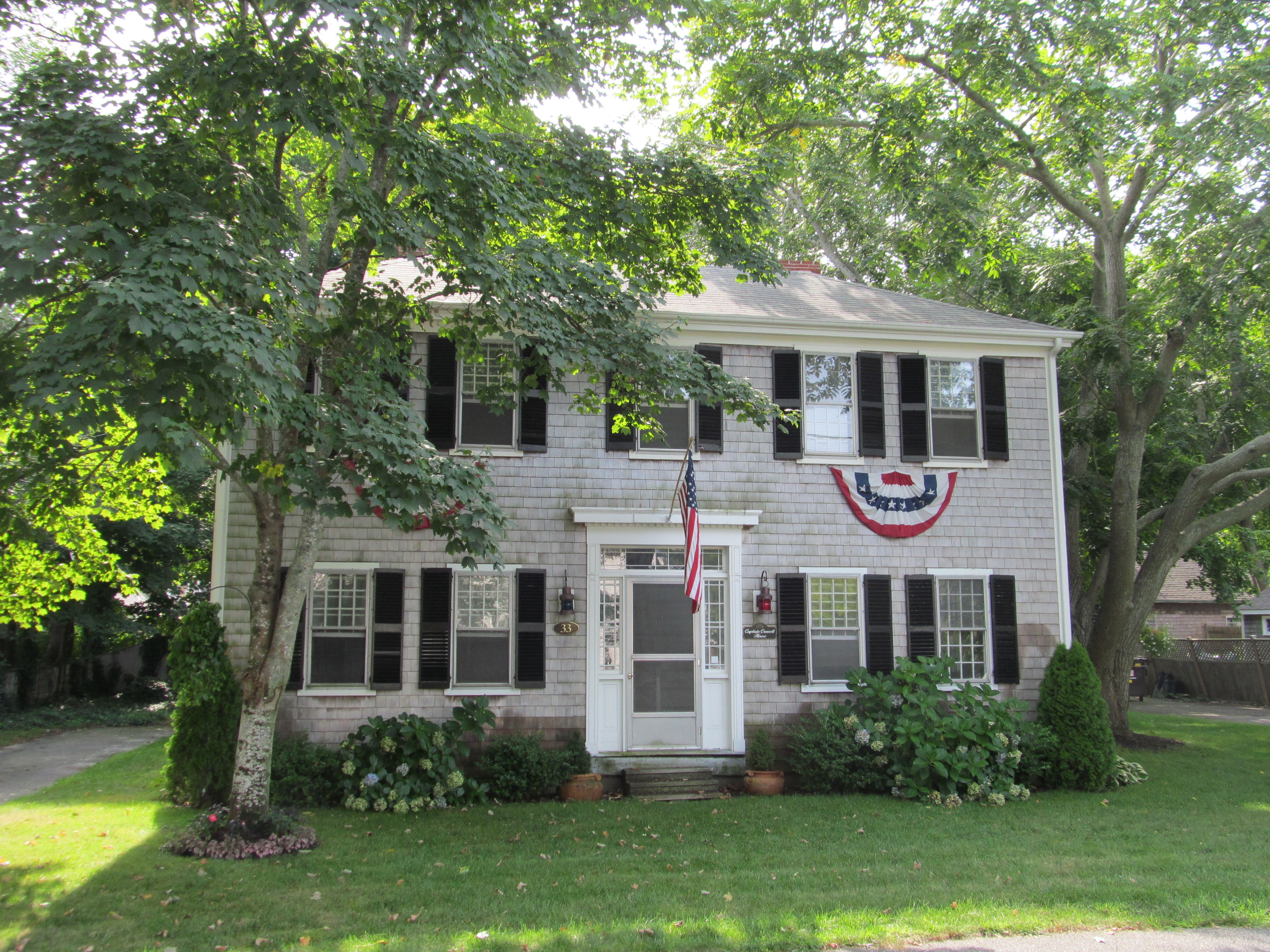
- Crowell–Smith House

- Location within Cape Cod Location within Massachusetts Location within the United States
- Location: 33 Pine Ave, Barnstable, Massachusetts
- Coordinates: 41°38′57″N 70°17′19″W
- Built: 1775
- Architectural style: Federal
- MPS: Barnstable MRA
- NRHP reference No.: 87000272
- Added to NRHP: March 13, 1987

The Crowell–Smith House, formerly the Crosby House, is a historic house in Barnstable, Massachusetts. Built on Main Street c. 1775, it is a well-preserved early Federal period house locally unusual for its rear chimney plan. It was listed on the National Register of Historic Places in 1987.

== Description and history ==
The Crowell–Smith House is set on a small residential lot between Main and South Streets in central Hyannis, a village of Barnstable. It is a two-story wood-frame structure, five bays wide, with a hip roof, twin chimneys on the rear wall, and wood shingle siding. A 1 1/2-story gable-roof ell extends to the rear. The main entry has a Greek Revival surround with sidelight and transom windows, and an architrave with lintel above. Fenestration is uniformly 12-over-12 sash with shutters.

An early history of Barnstable recorded that this house was built c. 1775 by one ship captain named Crosby, and was later owned by an unrelated Crosby who was also a ship's captain. Research in the early 21st century determined that the house was in fact built in the early 19th century for Captain Abner Crowell, and served for a time as the parsonage for the First Baptist Church before being sold to Captain Abner T. Crowell. It was acquired by the Smith family in 1949 and moved to its present location from Main Street in the 1950s. The house was originally listed on the National Register of Historic Places as the "Crosby House", but the name was changed to "Crowell–Smith House" in 2011.

== See also ==
- National Register of Historic Places listings in Barnstable County, Massachusetts
