= Daniel Crosby House =

Historic house in Massachusetts, United States

- U.S. National Register of Historic Places
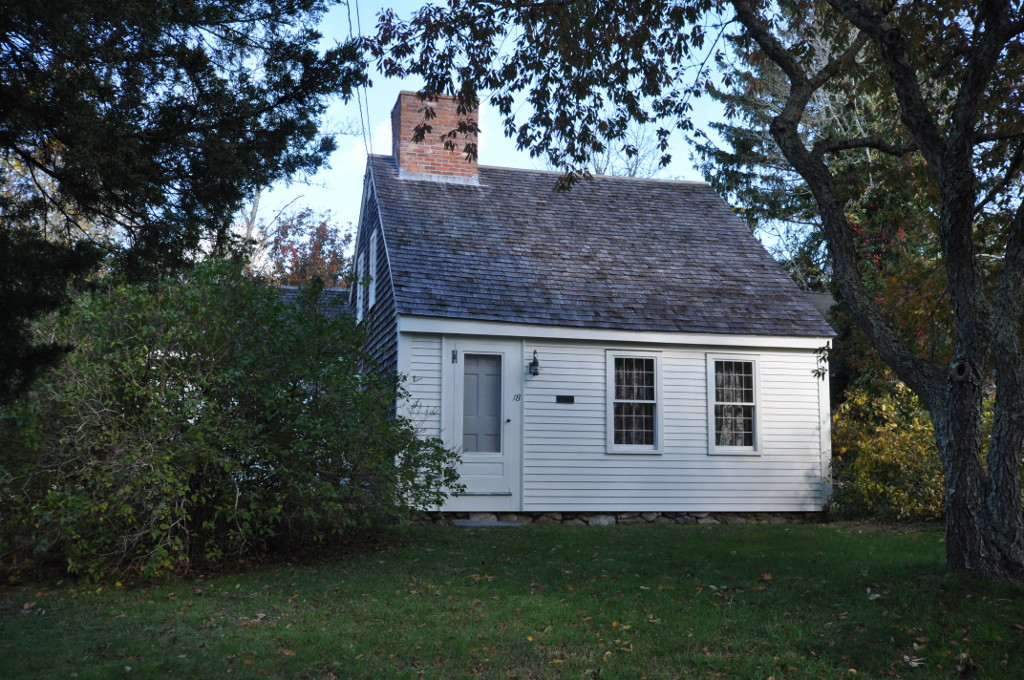

- Location within Cape Cod Location within Massachusetts Location within the United States
- Location: 18 Bay St., Barnstable, Massachusetts
- Coordinates: 41°37′44″N 70°23′18″W
- Built: 1749
- Architectural style: Georgian
- MPS: Barnstable MRA
- NRHP reference No.: 87000306
- Added to NRHP: September 18, 1987

The Daniel Crosby House is a historic house located in the Osterville village of Barnstable, Massachusetts.

== Description and history ==
Built c. 1790, it is a 1 1/2-story "half Cape" (three bays wide), with a side entry and chimney. This well-preserved house was owned by Daniel Crosby, the progenitor of the locally prominent Crosby family, and Reverend Edward Bourne Hinckley, the community's first librarian. It was also home to the local historical society for a time.

The house was listed on the National Register of Historic Places on September 18, 1987.

== See also ==
- National Register of Historic Places listings in Barnstable County, Massachusetts
