= Downtown Roswell Historic District =

- U.S. National Register of Historic Places
- U.S. Historic district
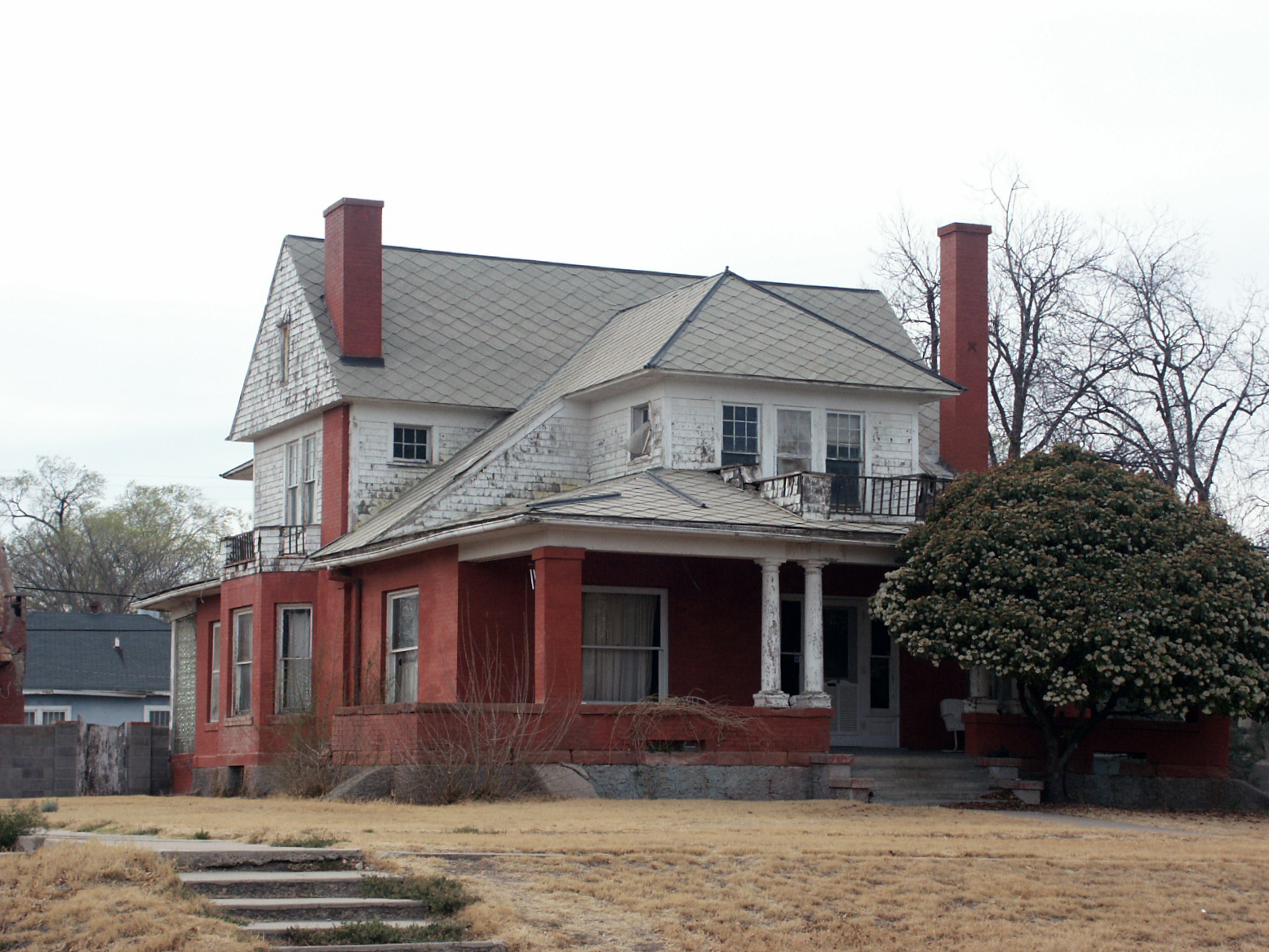
- House at 500 North Missouri Ave. in 2006

- Location within New Mexico Location within the United States
- Location: Roughly bounded by 8th St., Richardson Ave., Albuquerque St. and Missouri Ave., Roswell, New Mexico
- Coordinates: 33°24′05″N 104°31′36″W
- Area: 145 acres (59 ha)
- Built by: Multiple
- Architect: Multiple
- Architectural style: Bungalow/craftsman, Late Victorian, Hipped Box
- MPS: Roswell New Mexico MRA
- NRHP reference No.: 85001543
- Added to NRHP: May 16, 1985

The Downtown Roswell Historic District is a 145 acres (59 ha) historic district which was listed on the National Register of Historic Places in 1985. Roughly bounded by 8th St., Richardson Ave., Albuquerque St. and Missouri Ave. in Roswell, the district included 298 contributing buildings.

It covers about 38 city blocks and 433 properties, mostly residences besides commercial properties along West Second Street, including non-contributing ones. It covers the area of four residential subdivisions created during 1887 to 1899.

The district includes the James Phelps White House, which is separately listed on the National Register.
