= Lake Arthur, New Mexico =

- Town
- Location of Lake Arthur, New Mexico

- Location in the United States
- Coordinates: 33°00′05″N 104°21′50″W
- Country: United States
- State: New Mexico
- County: Chaves

Area
  - Total: 0.53 sq mi (1.38 km^{2})
  - Land: 0.53 sq mi (1.38 km^{2})
  - Water: 0 sq mi (0.00 km^{2})
- Elevation: 3,383 ft (1,031 m)

Population (2020)
  - Total: 378
  - Density: 710.3/sq mi (274.25/km^{2})
- Time zone: UTC-7 (Mountain (MST))
  - Summer (DST): UTC-6 (MDT)
- ZIP code: 88253
- Area code: 575
- FIPS code: 35-37840
- GNIS feature ID: 2412862

Lake Arthur is a town in Chaves County, New Mexico, United States. The population was 378 at the 2020 census.

== Geography ==
Lake Arthur is located near the southern border of Chaves County about 1 mile (1.6 km) west of the Pecos River. New Mexico State Road 2 passes through the town, leading north 9 miles (14 km) to Hagerman and south 11 miles (18 km) to Artesia.

According to the United States Census Bureau, the town has a total area of 0.54 square miles (1.4 km^{2}), all of it land.

== Demographics ==
Historical population
Census	Pop.	Note	%±
1910	344		—
1920	141		−59.0%
1930	215		52.5%
1940	279		29.8%
1950	380		36.2%
1960	387		1.8%
1970	306		−20.9%
1980	327		6.9%
1990	336		2.8%
2000	432		28.6%
2010	436		0.9%
2020	378		−13.3%
U.S. Decennial Census

As of the census of 2000, there were 432 people, 134 households, and 107 families residing in the town. The population density was 789.2 inhabitants per square mile (304.7/km^{2}). There were 149 housing units at an average density of 272.2 per square mile (105.1/km^{2}). The racial makeup of the town was 62.96% White, 0.46% Native American, 0.69% Asian, 34.49% from other races, and 1.39% from two or more races. Hispanic or Latino of any race were 70.14% of the population.

There were 134 households, out of which 47.0% had children under the age of 18 living with them, 56.7% were married couples living together, 17.2% had a female householder with no husband present, and 20.1% were non-families. 17.9% of all households were made up of individuals, and 8.2% had someone living alone who was 65 years of age or older. The average household size was 3.22 and the average family size was 3.62.

In the town, the population was spread out, with 38.4% under the age of 18, 8.3% from 18 to 24, 28.0% from 25 to 44, 14.6% from 45 to 64, and 10.6% who were 65 years of age or older. The median age was 29 years. For every 100 females, there were 114.9 males. For every 100 females age 18 and over, there were 103.1 males.

The median income for a household in the town was $22,386, and the median income for a family was $22,679. Males had a median income of $26,875 versus $15,179 for females. The per capita income for the town was $8,497. About 24.7% of families and 24.6% of the population were below the poverty line, including 31.1% of those under age 18 and 6.5% of those age 65 or over.

== Badge-factory ==
Since the enactment of the Law Enforcement Officers Safety Act in 2004, "qualified law enforcement officer" and “qualified retired or separated law enforcement officer" have been given permission to carry a concealed firearm in any jurisdiction in the United States, regardless of state or local laws, with certain exceptions. In 2018, it was revealed that billionaire Robert Mercer (owner of Breitbart News, Cambridge Analytica, and others) was a volunteer policeman with Lake Arthur Police Department from 2011. This enrollment permitted him to carry a concealed weapon in all 50 states. Mercer also obtained police badges (old-fashioned stars) for bodyguards working for the Koch brothers and Breitbart news. The police department was shut down in April 2018 after these "badges-for-cash" were reported in the media.
