= Patrick Floyd Garrett House =

- U.S. National Register of Historic Places
- Location within New Mexico
- Nearest city: Roswell, New Mexico
- Coordinates: 33°24′14″N 104°26′17″W
- Area: less than one acre
- Architectural style: New Mexico vernacular
- MPS: Roswell New Mexico MRA
- NRHP reference No.: 85003637
- Added to NRHP: August 29, 1988

The Patrick Floyd Garrett House, in Chaves County, New Mexico near Roswell, was listed on the National Register of Historic Places in 1988.

It is an adobe homestead house from the early 1880s, in what has been termed New Mexico vernacular architecture, with additional significance as the home of Pat Garrett, who killed Billy the Kid in 1881.

Garrett, while living here, planned "a vast irrigation scheme which, though brought to fruition by others, had a major impact on the course of settlement and agriculture in the region".

It is located on Bosque Rd. about 3 miles (4.8 km) north of Roswell, in Pecos Valley.
