= James Phelps White House =

- U.S. National Register of Historic Places
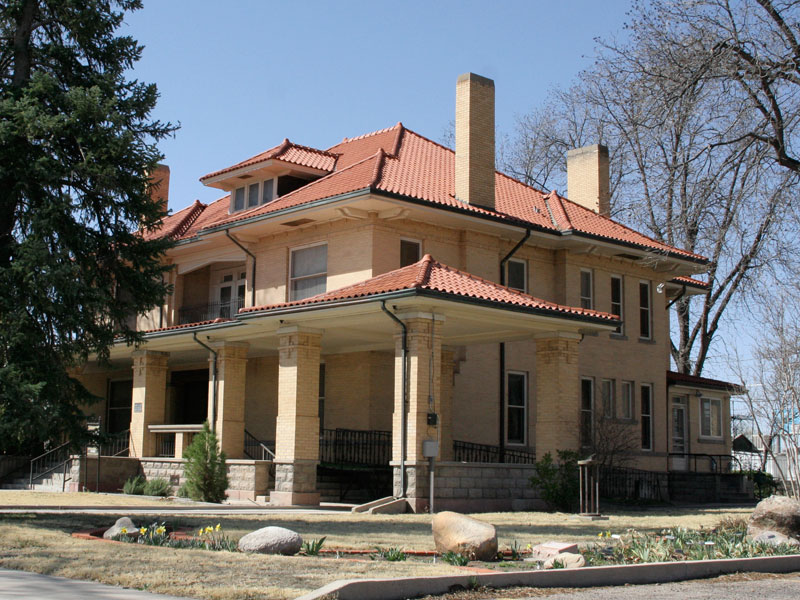

- Location within New Mexico
- Location: 200 N. Lea Ave., Roswell, New Mexico
- Coordinates: 33°23′40″N 104°31′44″W
- Area: less than one acre
- Built: 1910-12
- Built by: Tomlinson, David Young
- Architectural style: Western Stick;Prairie style
- NRHP reference No.: 78001812
- Added to NRHP: July 24, 1978

The James Phelps White House, at 200 N. Lea Ave. in Roswell, New Mexico, was built in 1910–1912. It was listed on the National Register of Historic Places in 1978. The listing included two contributing buildings.

It is a two-and-a-half-story yellow brick house built for Roswell area rancher James Phelps White. It was built by his father-in-law, David Young Tomlinson, apparently following design of a house which White's wife liked in Fort Worth, Texas where Tomlinson and brothers were building contractors.

It includes Western Stick architecture and Prairie style architecture.
