= Saunders-Crosby House =

- U.S. National Register of Historic Places
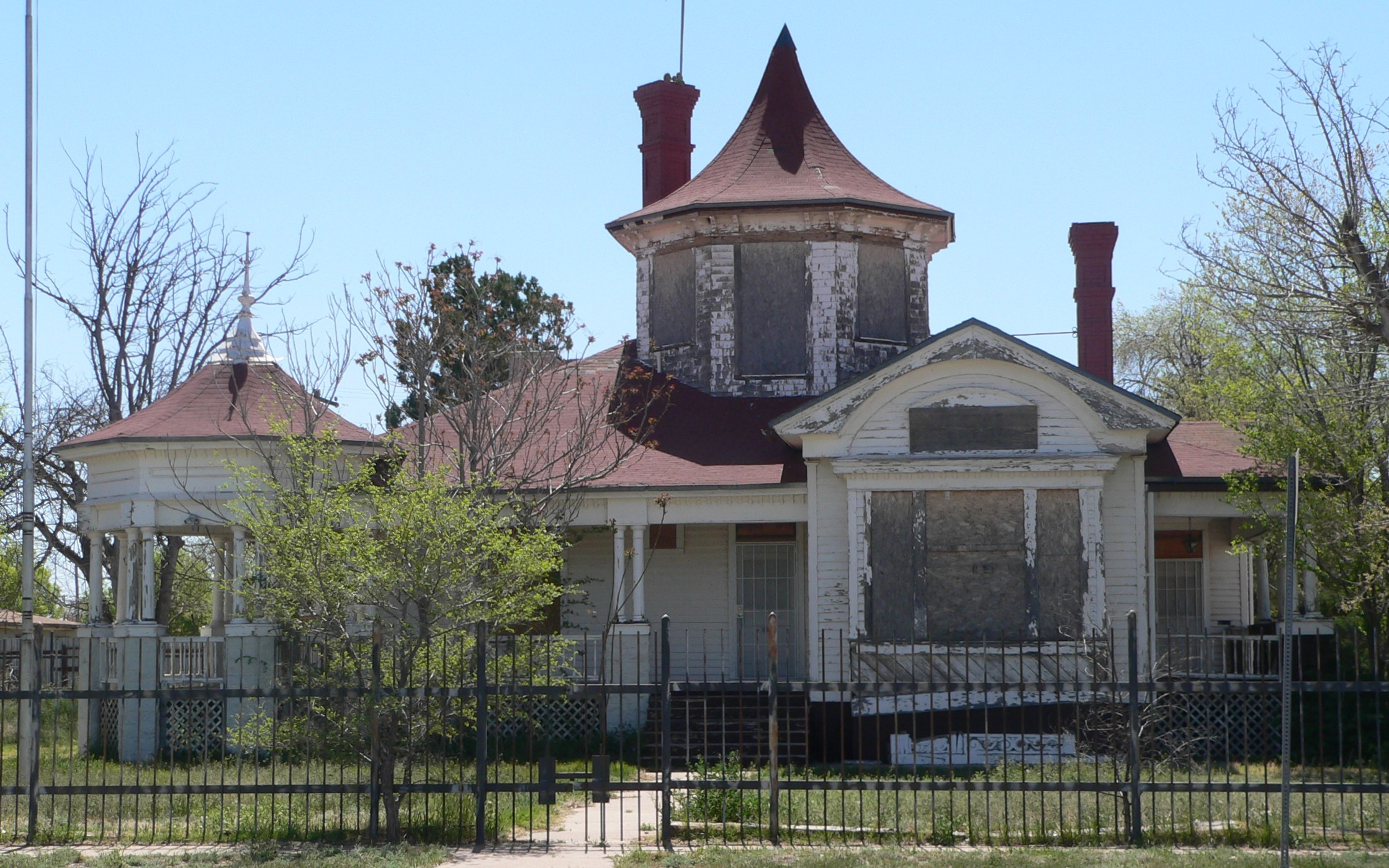
- House, vacant, in 2016

- Location within New Mexico
- Location: 200 E. Deming, Roswell, New Mexico
- Coordinates: 33°23′07″N 104°31′14″W
- Area: less than one acre
- Built: 1905
- Architectural style: Queen Anne
- MPS: Roswell New Mexico MRA
- NRHP reference No.: 85001545
- Added to NRHP: May 16, 1985

The Saunders-Crosby House, at 200 E. Deming in Roswell, New Mexico, was built in 1905. It was listed on the National Register of Historic Places in 1985.

It is unusual in its Queen Anne style because it has a two-story hexagonal cupola and a hexagonal porch and cupola. All eaves have Victorian gingerbread trim.

It was purchased in 1907 as part of recruiting H.P. Saunders, a banker, to move from Dallas, Texas. Mrs. Ruby Saunders Crosby, a daughter who served in the Red Cross overseas during World War I, donated the house to the American National Red Cross in 1965. The Red Cross owned it in 1985.
