= Robert H. Goddard House =

Historic house in New Mexico, United States

- U.S. National Register of Historic Places
- Location within New Mexico Location within the United States
- Location: 1501 East Mescalero Road (Rt 3 E.), near Roswell, New Mexico
- Coordinates: 33°25′53″N 104°30′07″W
- Area: less than one acre
- Built: 1908
- Architectural style: Pueblo Revival
- MPS: Roswell New Mexico MRA
- NRHP reference No.: 85003594
- Added to NRHP: July 15, 1988

The Robert H. Goddard House, located at 1501 East Mescalero Road near Roswell, New Mexico, was built in 1908. Also known as Mescalero Ranch, it is a Pueblo Revival building. It was listed on the National Register of Historic Places in 1988.

It was a home of rocket scientist Robert H. Goddard during 1930 to 1932 and from 1934 to 1942, a time for Goddard's experiments in rocketry.

It is a one-story adobe flat-roofed building covered with stucco.
