= Fort Sumner, New Mexico =

Village and county seat in De Baca County, New Mexico, United States

- Village
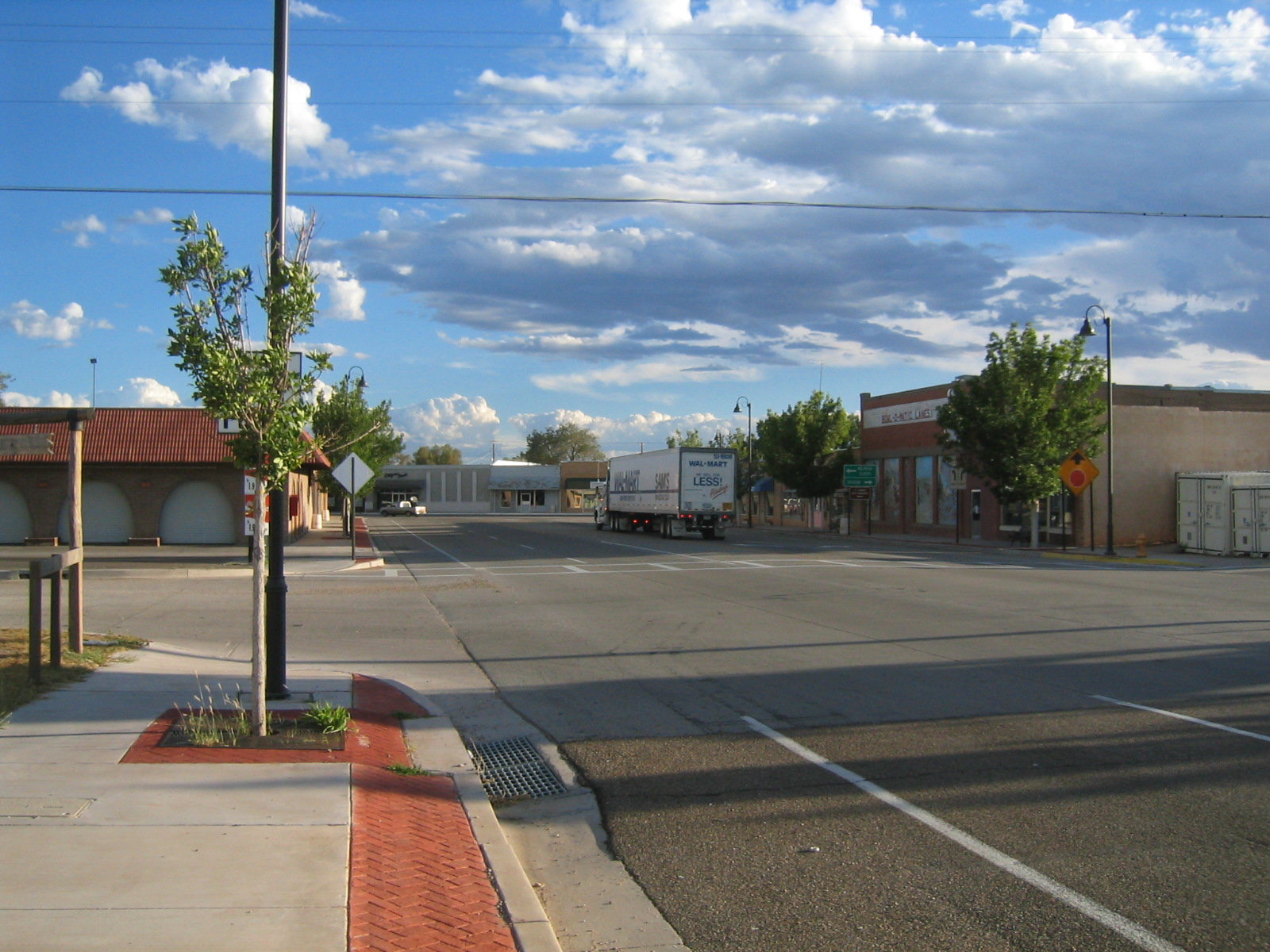
- Downtown Fort Sumner in 2003

- Location of Fort Sumner, New Mexico

- Location in the United States
- Coordinates: 34°28′33″N 104°14′53″W
- Country: United States
- State: New Mexico
- County: De Baca

Area
  - Total: 3.34 sq mi (8.66 km^{2})
  - Land: 3.31 sq mi (8.58 km^{2})
  - Water: 0.031 sq mi (0.08 km^{2})
- Elevation: 4,045 ft (1,233 m)

Population (2020)
  - Total: 889
  - Estimate (2023): 863
  - Density: 268.2/sq mi (103.56/km^{2})
- Time zone: UTC-07:00 (MST)
  - Summer (DST): UTC-06:00 (MDT)
- ZIP code: 88119
- Area code: 575
- FIPS code: 35-27340
- GNIS feature ID: 2413553
- Website: www.fortsumner.net

Fort Sumner is a village in and the county seat of De Baca County, New Mexico, United States. As of the 2020 census, Fort Sumner had a population of 889. Fort Sumner is the spring and fall home of the Columbia Scientific Balloon Facility.

== History ==
Named after former New Mexico Territory military governor Edwin Vose Sumner, U.S. Fort Sumner was a military fort established in 1862 and charged with the internment of nearby Navajo and Mescalero Apache populations from 1863 to 1868. The federal government closed the fort in 1868 and sold its buildings to Lucien Maxwell, a prominent New Mexico landowner, in 1870. In the latter 1870s Maxwell's son Pete and daughter Paulita befriended legendary outlaw Billy the Kid, and it was in his house that Billy was killed by Pat Garrett. Billy the Kid is buried in the old military cemetery in Fort Sumner, as is Lucien Maxwell.

In 1866, the U.S. government was holding thousands of Native American Indians at Fort Sumner after they were subdued by Kit Carson. Charles Goodnight and Oliver Loving saw a business opportunity and decided to sell beef to the United States Government so that the captive, displaced, and imprisoned Native Americans could be fed. This enterprise led to the establishment of the Goodnight-Loving Trail.

In March 1908, the Eastern Railway of New Mexico (as subsidiary of the Atchison, Topeka and Santa Fe Railway) arrived as part of the Belen Cutoff; now BNSF.

In the 1920s the Transcontinental Air Transport airline built an airfield in Fort Sumner as part of its coast-to-coast air passenger network, but the site was abandoned when the airline's ambitious plans collapsed in the Great Depression. The airfield was reopened by the United States Army Air Forces as a training base during World War II. After the war, the base became the Fort Sumner Municipal Airport, and was chosen as a launch site for NASA's high-altitude balloon program (see Columbia Scientific Balloon Facility).

== Geography ==
Fort Sumner is located northeast of the center of De Baca County on the north side of the Pecos River.

U.S. Route 60 passes through the village as Sumner Avenue, leading east 61 miles (98 km) to Clovis and west 58 miles (93 km) to Vaughn. U.S. Route 84 comes in from the north as 4th Street, leading northwest 44 miles (71 km) to Santa Rosa. US 84 runs east from Fort Sumner with US 60 to Clovis and the Texas border beyond it.

=== Climate ===
According to the United States Census Bureau, the village of Fort Sumner has a total area of 3.34 square miles (8.66 km^{2}), of which 3.31 square miles (8.58 km^{2}) is land and 0.03 square miles (0.08 km^{2}), or 0.93%, is water.

Climate data for Fort Sumner, New Mexico, 1991–2020 normals, extremes 1908–present (Note: FT SUMNER 1908–2011, FT SUMNER 5 S 2004–PRESENT)
Month	Jan	Feb	Mar	Apr	May	Jun	Jul	Aug	Sep	Oct	Nov	Dec	Year
Record high °F (°C)	80 (27)	86 (30)	99 (37)	98 (37)	103 (39)	109 (43)	110 (43)	108 (42)	104 (40)	95 (35)	89 (32)	82 (28)	110 (43)
Mean daily maximum °F (°C)	54.9 (12.7)	59.5 (15.3)	67.4 (19.7)	74.2 (23.4)	81.8 (27.7)	90.5 (32.5)	91.7 (33.2)	89.9 (32.2)	83.7 (28.7)	74.3 (23.5)	63.1 (17.3)	54.7 (12.6)	73.8 (23.2)
Daily mean °F (°C)	39.7 (4.3)	43.9 (6.6)	51.4 (10.8)	58.6 (14.8)	67.1 (19.5)	76.4 (24.7)	79.0 (26.1)	77.2 (25.1)	70.2 (21.2)	59.3 (15.2)	47.9 (8.8)	39.8 (4.3)	59.2 (15.1)
Mean daily minimum °F (°C)	24.6 (−4.1)	28.3 (−2.1)	35.4 (1.9)	42.9 (6.1)	52.4 (11.3)	62.3 (16.8)	66.2 (19.0)	64.6 (18.1)	56.7 (13.7)	44.4 (6.9)	32.6 (0.3)	24.9 (−3.9)	44.6 (7.0)
Record low °F (°C)	−27 (−33)	−18 (−28)	2 (−17)	14 (−10)	26 (−3)	40 (4)	46 (8)	48 (9)	32 (0)	5 (−15)	−1 (−18)	−18 (−28)	−27 (−33)
Average precipitation inches (mm)	0.45 (11)	0.49 (12)	0.69 (18)	1.44 (37)	1.17 (30)	1.46 (37)	2.56 (65)	2.31 (59)	1.63 (41)	1.87 (47)	0.39 (9.9)	0.62 (16)	15.08 (382.9)
Average snowfall inches (cm)	3.0 (7.6)	1.3 (3.3)	1.0 (2.5)	0.2 (0.51)	0.0 (0.0)	0.0 (0.0)	0.0 (0.0)	0.0 (0.0)	0.0 (0.0)	0.3 (0.76)	0.7 (1.8)	2.6 (6.6)	9.1 (23.07)
Average precipitation days (≥ 0.01 in)	3.3	3.5	4.5	4.0	5.4	6.2	8.0	8.4	6.0	5.0	3.2	4.1	61.6
Average snowy days (≥ 0.1 in)	1.3	1.0	0.6	0.1	0.0	0.0	0.0	0.0	0.0	0.1	0.4	1.5	5.0
Source 1: NOAA
Source 2: xmACIS2

== Demographics ==
Historical population
Census	Pop.	Note	%±
1920	777		—
1930	839		8.0%
1940	1,669		98.9%
1950	1,982		18.8%
1960	1,809		−8.7%
1970	1,615		−10.7%
1980	1,421		−12.0%
1990	1,269		−10.7%
2000	1,249		−1.6%
2010	1,031		−17.5%
2020	889		−13.8%
U.S. Decennial Census

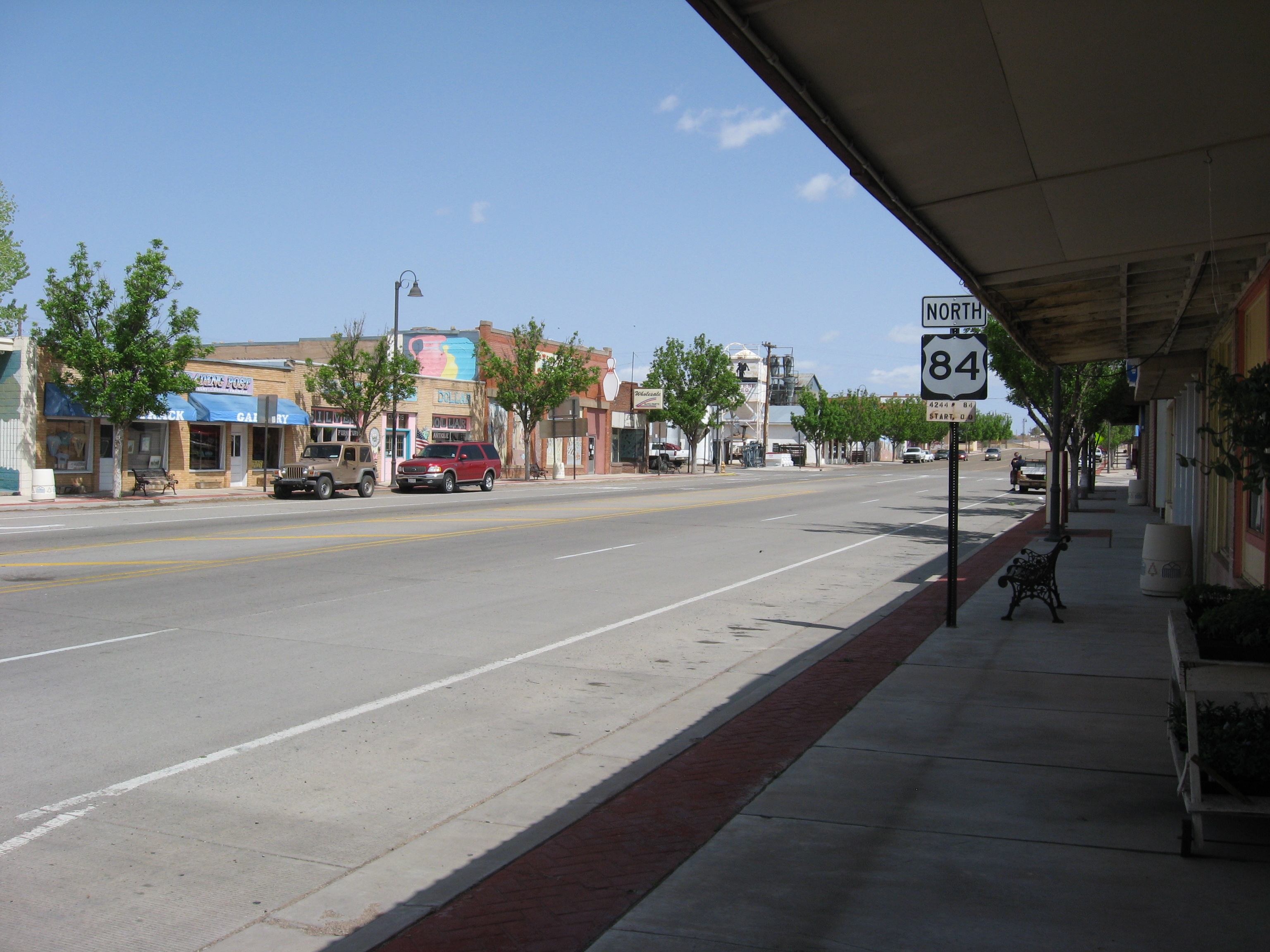
Along U.S. Route 84 in Fort Sumner

As of the census of 2000, there were 1,249 people, 533 households, and 312 families residing in the village. The population density was 374.6 people per square mile (144.6 people/km^{2}). There were 680 housing units at an average density of 204.0 per square mile (78.8/km^{2}). The racial makeup of the village was 81.91% White, 0.80% Native American, 0.08% Asian, 15.29% from other races, and 1.92% from two or more races. Hispanic or Latino of any race were 48.28% of the population.

There were 533 households, out of which 22.9% had children under the age of 18 living with them, 45.8% were married couples living together, 9.4% had a female householder with no husband present, and 41.3% were non-families. 38.6% of all households were made up of individuals, and 23.3% had someone living alone who was 65 years of age or older. The average household size was 2.21 and the average family size was 2.97.

In the village, the population was spread out, with 22.4% under the age of 18, 5.6% from 18 to 24, 21.2% from 25 to 44, 19.5% from 45 to 64, and 31.3% who were 65 years of age or older. The median age was 46 years. For every 100 females, there were 92.4 males. For every 100 females age 18 and over, there were 86.3 males.

The median income for a household in the village was $19,583, and the median income for a family was $28,625. Males had a median income of $24,722 versus $16,953 for females. The per capita income for the village was $13,327. About 20.4% of families and 25.3% of the population were below the poverty line, including 33.9% of those under age 18 and 17.1% of those age 65 or over.

== Education ==
Fort Sumner Municipal Schools is the school district of all of De Baca County.

== In popular culture ==
- Fort Sumner is featured in the video game, American Truck Simulator.

== See also ==
- List of municipalities in New Mexico
