= Palacio del Gobernador =

Government building in Manila

Coordinates: 14.5916°N 120.9725°E

- The facade of the Palacio del Gobernador
- Interactive map of the Palacio del Gobernador area

General information
- Location: Manila, Philippines
- Current tenants: Commission on Elections; Intramuros Administration
- Completed: 1976

Design and construction
- Architect: Otilio Arellano
- Designations: NHCP marked structure

Website
- www.pdgcc.gov.ph

The Palacio del Gobernador (transl. Governor's Palace) is a government building located in Intramuros, Manila, Philippines. It is located southwest from Plaza de Roma and built in its current form in 1976.

The building houses the Intramuros Administration, the Commission on Elections and the Home Development Mutual Fund National Capital Region Office. It also previously housed the Bureau of the Treasury until it relocated across Plaza de Roma to the Ayuntamiento de Manila in July 2013.

== History ==
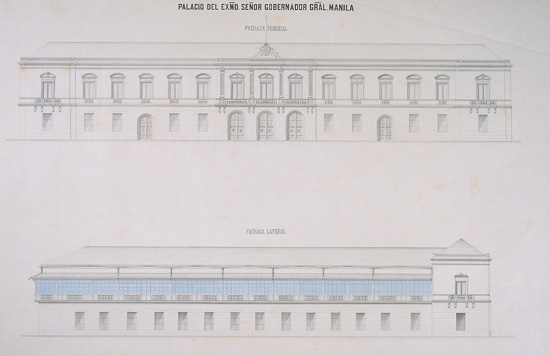
A drawing of the Palacio del Gobernador as it appeared prior to the earthquake of 1863. Note the European-style front, and Philippine-style side of the palace.

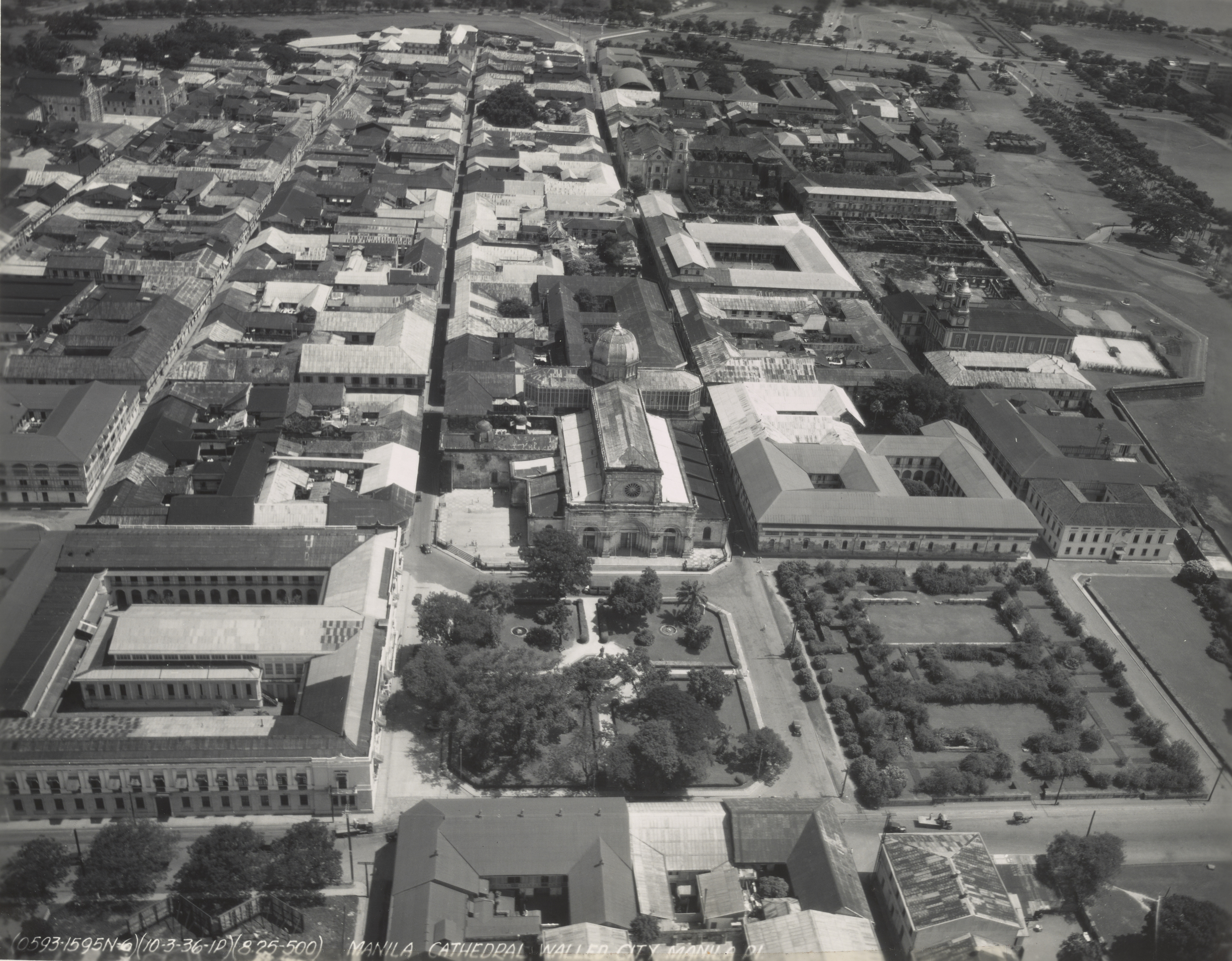
The foundations of the palace can be seen to the right of Plaza de Roma, in this prewar view of Intramuros.

=== Original Governor's Palace ===
The present building lies on the footprint of the former residence of the Governor-General of the Philippines during the Spanish colonial era. Alongside Palacio del Gobernador, the original building was also known as the Casa Real (Royal House) or Real Audiencia (appellate court), references to the governor's role as representative of the Spanish monarch and justice in the Philippines. The first Casa Real was constructed in Fort Santiago in 1599, but was destroyed in the 1645 Luzon earthquake.

The second palace was constructed as one of the four buildings flanking Manila's Plaza de Armas (collectively known as the Casas Reales or "Royal Houses") in the mid-17th century, along with the Ayuntamiento, Manila Cathedral, and the Cabildo (no longer standing). It was originally the residence of Manuel Estacio Venegas, secretary to the Captain General, until he was imprisoned in 1660 and had his residence confiscated and given to the Governor-General.

The Palacio del Gobernador was a two-storey building, with a rusticated ground floor, second-floor piano nobile, and attic topped by a tiled hip roof. It was rebuilt in 1733 and 1745. The building underwent a comprehensive renovations in the European style in 1845, although its back retained a typical bahay na bato style, with the second floor covered by capiz shells windows.

The governor's residence was located in the palace until an earthquake destroyed it on June 3, 1863. Governor-General Rafael de Echagüe y Bermingham moved upriver to Malacañang Palace after the earthquake, and it became the governor-general's official residence. The move to Malacañang was intended to be temporary until the original palace was rebuilt, but this plan was soon abandoned, leaving only the stone foundations. The lot of the palace eventually was planted with trees and became a park-like extension of the Plaza de Armas.

The lot was the site of an air raid shelter during World War Two. 80 men were killed there in 1945.

=== Present building ===
In 1976, construction began on a condominium at the site of the old Governor's Palace. Jaime Laya, then Minister for Budget, was alarmed by the construction of a modern building in the Intramuros district, particularly in close proximity to Manila Cathedral. He alerted President Ferdinand Marcos, who took an interest in the preservation of Manila's colonial heritage and immediately ordered that construction be halted. He relented after the president of the Land Bank of the Philippines, Basílio Estanislao, which was building the new Palacio, pointed out the structure had already reached three storeys.

However, the appearance of the modern Palacio in Intramuros sufficiently shocked the national government to pursue a comprehensive heritage preservation scheme in the walled city. The Intramuros Administration, which regulates new constructions in the district, was founded in 1979 in reaction to the building of the Palacio. Ironically, the Intramuros Authority eventually occupied offices in the Palacio, and remains one of its principal tenants.

Despite alarm voiced at the Palacio's modern appearance, the eight-storey building's ground floor was built in a historicist style on the footprint of the old palace. The ground floor also holds items from the Intramuros Authority's museum collections, mostly religious art.

The building's exterior was used in the Chuck Norris film Delta Force 2: The Colombian Connection for a scene set in Rio de Janeiro during a Brazilian Carnaval parade.

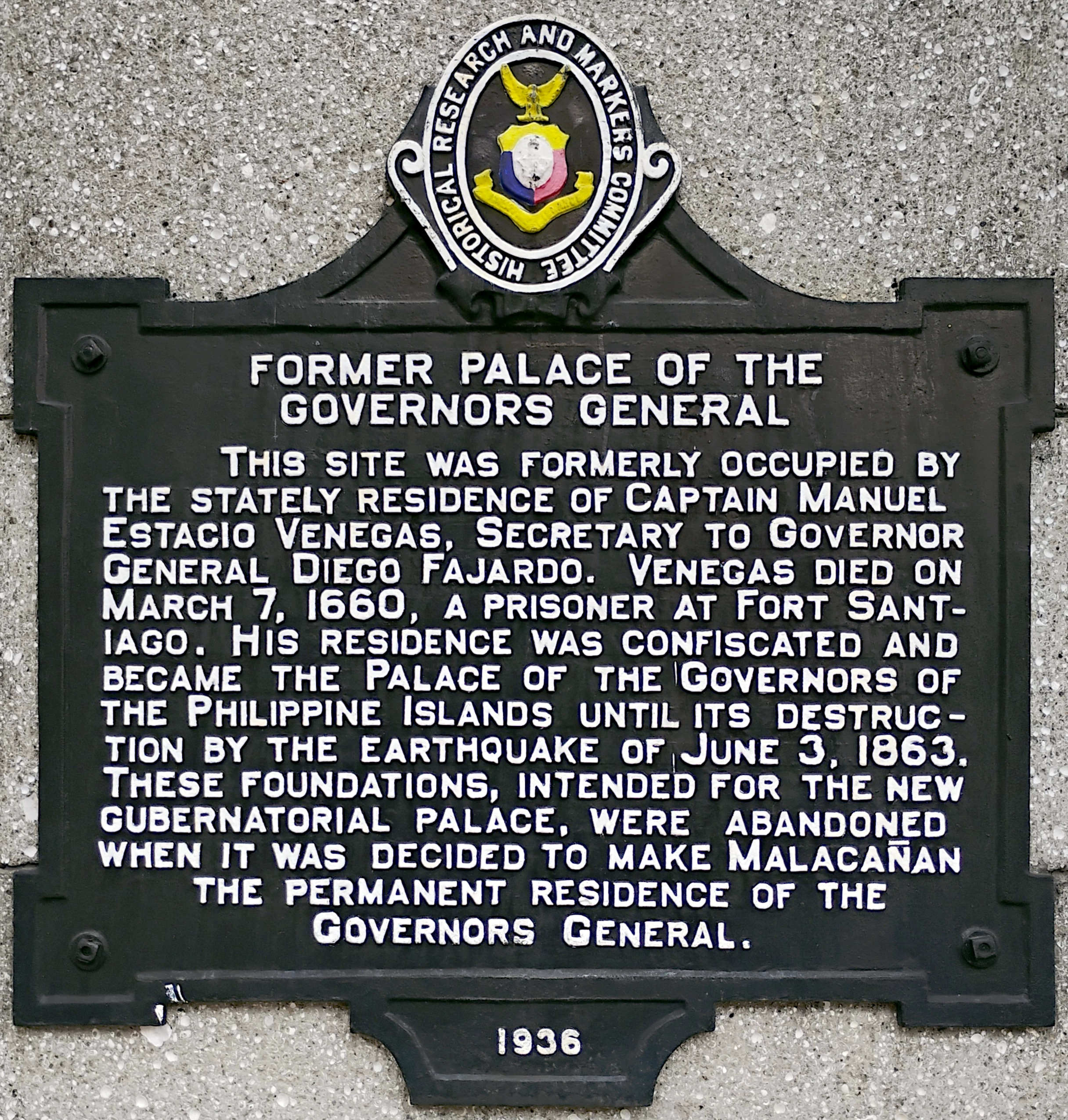
A historical marker installed in 1936 by the Historical Research and Markers Committee (American-era predecessor of the National Historical Commission of the Philippines) to mark the then-ruins as a historical landmark.
