= Manila Cathedral =

Roman Catholic church in Manila, Philippines

The Manila Cathedral
- Minor Basilica and Metropolitan Cathedral of the Immaculate Conception
- The Mother Church of the Philippines (Note: It is one of two claimants of the title of mother church in the country, the other being the Basilica del Santo Niño in Cebu City which was canonically declared the title by Pope Paul VI in 1965.)
- Basilika Menor at Kalakhang Katedral ng Kalinis-linisang Paglilihi (Filipino); Basílica Menor y Catedral Metropolitana de la Inmaculada Concepción (Spanish)
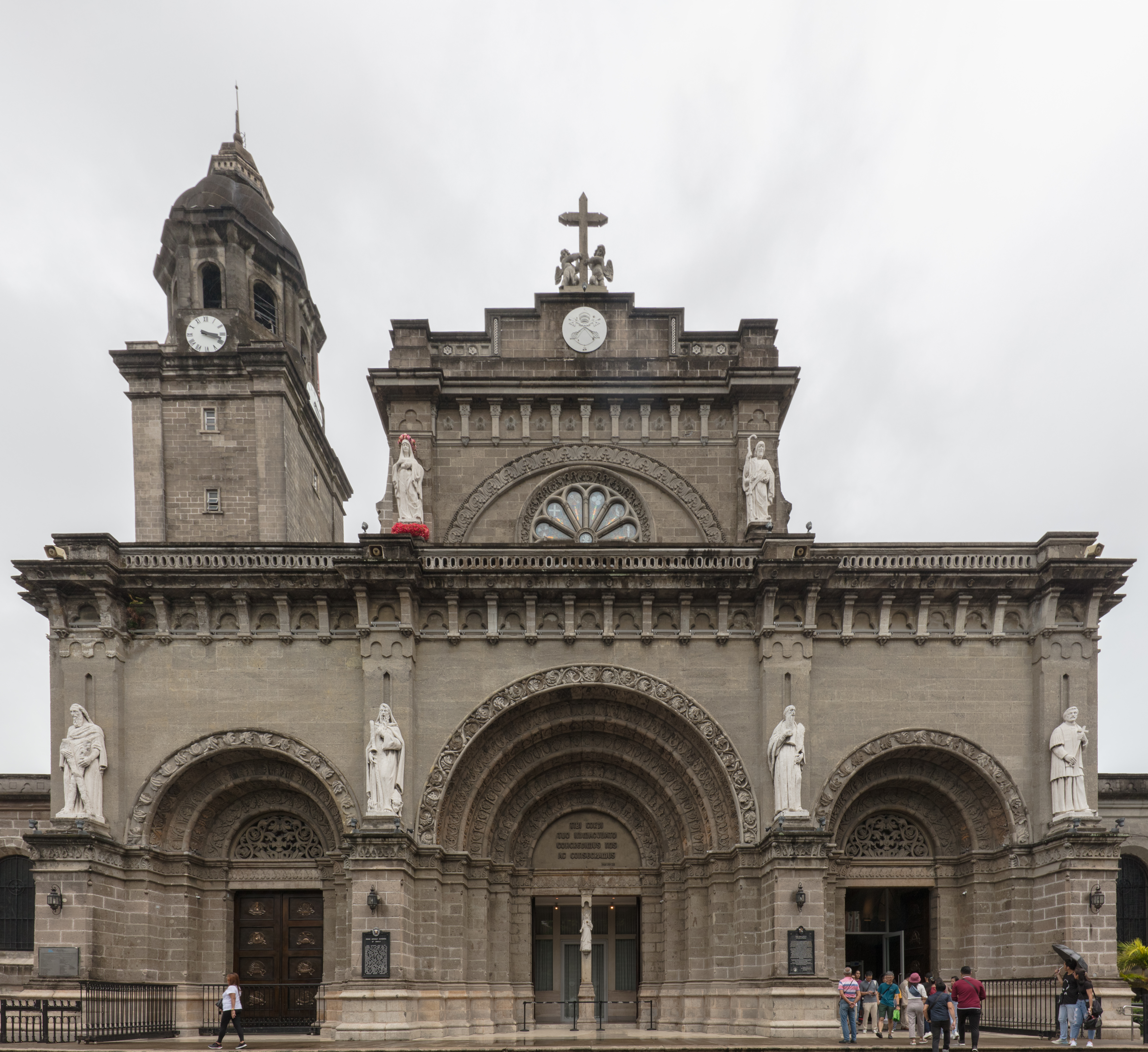
- Main northwestern façade in August 2023. The statue of Rose of Lima, a national patroness, is decorated with flowers for her feast day.
- The Manila Cathedral
- 14°35′29″N 120°58′25″E
- Location: Intramuros, Manila
- Country: Philippines
- Language(s): Filipino, English
- Denomination: Catholic
- Sui iuris church: Latin Church
- Tradition: Roman Rite
- Website: manilacathedral.com.ph

History
- Former name: Church of Manila
- Status: Cathedral; Minor basilica
- Founded: 1571; 455 years ago
- Founder: Fray Juan de Vivero
- Dedication: Immaculate Conception
- Dedicated: December 10, 2018; 7 years ago
- Earlier dedication: December 10, 1958; 67 years ago
- Consecrated: December 7, 1958; 67 years ago
- Events: List: Intramuros Grand Marian Procession (First Sunday in December); Patronal Feast (December 8); 33rd International Eucharistic Congress (February 1937); Papal Masses of Pope Paul VI (November 27, 1970), Pope John Paul II (February 17, 1981), and Pope Francis (January 16, 2015)

Architecture
- Functional status: Active
- Heritage designation: Important Cultural Property
- Designated: 2018
- Previous cathedrals: 7
- Architect: Fernando Ocampo
- Architectural type: Cathedral
- Style: Neo-Romanesque
- Years built: 1581 (dst. 1583); 1592 (dst. 1600); 1614 (dst. 1645); 1654–1662 (demo. 1751); 1760 (dst. 1852); 1854–1858 (dst. 1863); 1873–1879 (dst. 1945); 1954–1958
- Groundbreaking: December 8, 1954; 71 years ago
- Completed: December 8, 1958; 67 years ago
- Construction cost: ₱120 million (renovation)

Specifications
- Capacity: 2,000
- Length: 84.4 m (277 ft)
- Width: 31.4 m (103 ft)
- Materials: Adobe and cement

Administration
- Province: Manila
- Metropolis: Manila
- Archdiocese: Manila
- Deanery: Nuestra Señora de Guia

Clergy
- Archbishop: Cardinal Jose Advincula
- Rector: Rolando R. Dela Cruz
- Vicar: Vicente Gabriel S.J. Bautista

The Minor Basilica and Metropolitan Cathedral of the Immaculate Conception, (Note: Filipino: Basilika Menor at Kalakhang Katedral ng Kalinis-linisang Paglilihi; Spanish: Basílica Menor y Catedral Metropolitana de la Inmaculada Concepción) commonly known as the Manila Cathedral, (Note: Filipino: Katedral ng Maynila; Spanish: Catedral de Manila) is a Roman Catholic basilica and the cathedral of the Archdiocese of Manila. It is dedicated to the Blessed Virgin Mary of the Immaculate Conception, the principal patroness of the Philippines.

Originally constructed in 1571 as a parish under the Archdiocese of Mexico, the church became the seat of the new suffragan Diocese of Manila, which was established on February 6, 1579, by Pope Gregory XIII. The original structure dates from 1581, and its eighth re-construction was completed in 1958. On April 27, 1981, Pope John Paul II raised the shrine to the status of minor basilica through his motu proprio Quod Ipsum Manilensis.

The present basilica has merited apostolic visits from three popes: Paul VI, John Paul II and Francis.

== History ==
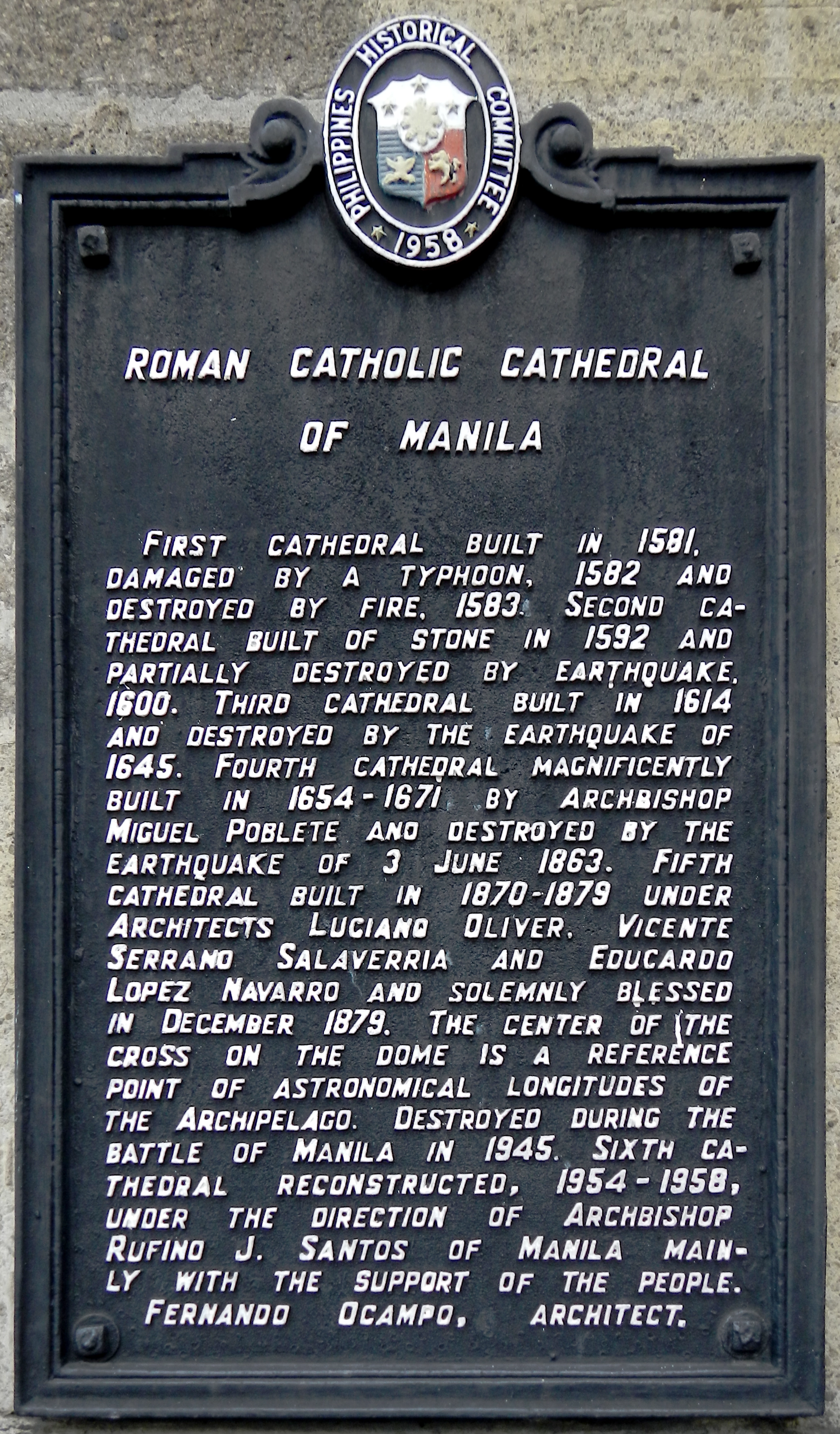
Church PHC historical marker installed in 1958

=== Parochial church (1571) ===
The secular priest Juan de Vivero baptized Rajah Matanda and arrived in Manila Bay in 1566, and established the "Church of Manila" in 1571. The former archbishop of Mexico, Alonso de Montúfar sent De Vivero, chaplain of the galleon San Gerónimo, to establish Christianity as the spiritual and religious administration in newly colonized Philippines. De Vivero later became vicar-general and the first ecclesiastical judge of Manila.

The Spanish conquistador Miguel López de Legazpi chose the church's location and placed it under the patronage of Saint Pudentiana. The church's first parish priest was Fray Juan de Villanueva.

=== First cathedral (1581–1583) ===
The church was elevated to a cathedral in 1579, coinciding with the canonical erection of the Diocese of Manila. In 1581, Domingo de Salazar, of the Order of Preachers and the first Bishop of Manila, constructed a new building made from nipa, wood, and bamboo that was consecrated on December 21, 1581, formally becoming a cathedral. The building was destroyed by a fire that started during the funeral of Governor-General Gonzalo Ronquillo de Peñalosa at San Agustín Church and razed much of the city.

=== Second cathedral (1592–1600) ===
The second cathedral, which was made of stone, was built in 1592. This cathedral had a central nave and two collateral naves. The building was nearly completed when Bishop Salazar left for Spain. He died on December 4, 1594, and never returned to Manila to become its first archbishop.

In 1595, the Holy See gave the cathedral sacred relics from 155 martyrs, 20 popes, Saint Polycarp and Saint Pudentiana, and these were taken to Manila. A side structure was built beside the main cathedral to enshrine the relics. Governor-General Juan Niño de Tabora and his wife Doña Magdalena Saldivar y Mendoza built an ancillary structure to house subsequent relics.

By 1597, the cathedral buildings were unfinished; it lacked a chapter hall, baptistry, bell tower, and cloister. On December 31, 1600, the cathedral was destroyed by an earthquake.

=== Third cathedral (1614–1645) ===
Archbishop Miguel de Benavides initiated the reconstruction of the cathedral. After his death in 1605, the project was passed on to his successor Diego Vázquez de Mercado. By 1607, the cathedral was in such a poor state it was abandoned. The third cathedral structure, consisting of three naves and seven chapels, was built in 1614, largely using donated funds from the fourth dean Don Francisco Gómez de Arellano. The seven chapels were built from donations given by the cathedral's patrons. On August 1, 1621, an earthquake caused serious damage to the cathedral's structure. Between 1641 and 1645, the cathedral was reconstructed but it was destroyed by a series of earthquakes in November and December 1645.

=== Fourth cathedral (1671–1751) ===
Reconstruction of the cathedral started after the arrival of Miguel de Poblete, the eighth Archbishop of Manila. The cornerstone of the fourth structure was laid on April 20, 1654. By 1659, the cathedral was nearly completed; the naves were enclosed and some halls were completed. In 1662, the main altar was built out of molave wood. The cathedral, which was made of quarried stone, lime and gravel, was blessed on June 7, 1662. In 1750, the Florentine friar Juan de Uguccioni added a media naranja ("half orange") dome above the crossing and introduced a transept to the structure. Following several earthquakes and typhoons, the fourth cathedral was demolished in 1751.

=== Fifth cathedral (1760–1852) ===
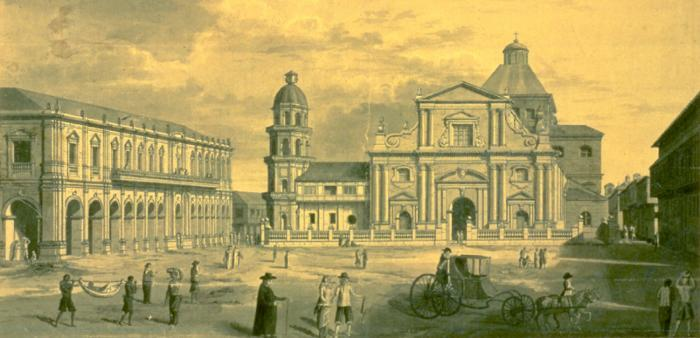
The fifth cathedral in 1792, by Fernando Brambila

Work on the fifth cathedral building started after the demolition of its predecessor. Uguccioni's designs brought major changes; the three-nave design was retained but the chapels were reduced. The fifth cathedral, which closely resembled the Jesuits' Church of the Gesù in Rome, was inaugurated on December 8, 1760; since then, there had been no modifications or alterations to the structure except for some minor repairs. The cathedral, particularly the dome structure, was repaired in 1839. It survived the British occupation of Manila between 1762 and 1764, but underwent repairs. It was damaged by an earthquake on September 16, 1852.

=== Sixth cathedral (1858–1863) ===
Bidding for the cathedral reconstruction was conducted in 1854 and the sixth structure was opened on March 31, 1858. The building had a new Neoclassical façade, which was later continued in the seventh and eighth structures. The sixth cathedral replaced the Baroque façade of the fifth cathedral and the truncated or box-like cupola was replaced with a circular dome.

On June 3, 1863, the sixth cathedral was damaged by a very strong earthquake that also damaged the palace of the Governor-General. Many called for the building's demolition and clearing of the site. Architect Don Antonio Moraleda proposed to demolish and clear the ruins but the plan was put on hold in 1866. The plan was renewed in 1868, when architect Vicente Serrano y Salaverri was commissioned to inspect and undertake a study of the ruins. Serrano concluded the cathedral ruins must be demolished and this occurred in 1870.

=== Seventh cathedral (1879–1945) ===
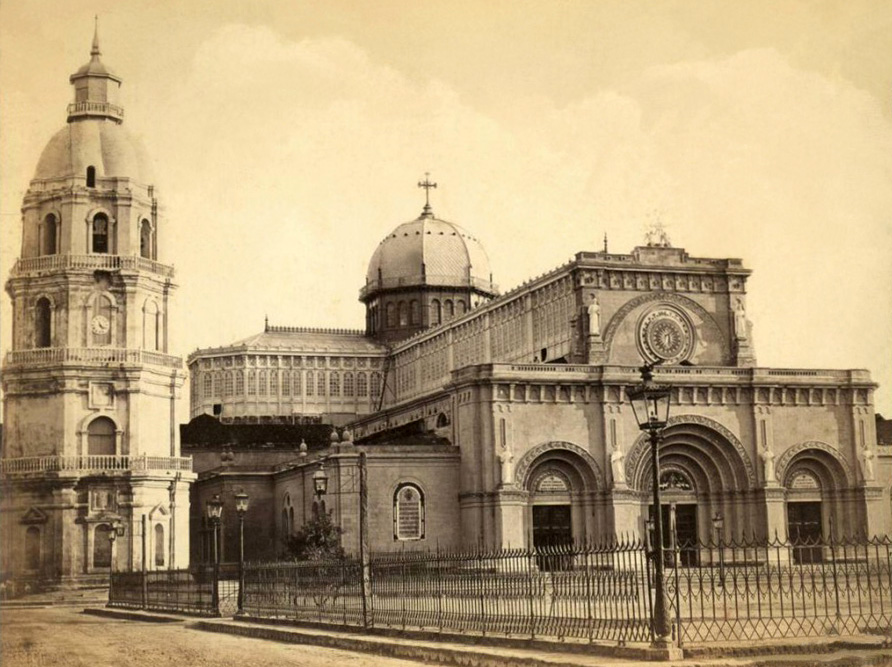
The seventh cathedral in 1880 prior to the earthquake which destroyed its belfry

The seventh cathedral was constructed from 1873 to 1879, and was consecrated on December 7, 1879. The cross atop the central dome became a reference point for astronomical longitudes of the archipelago. In 1880, another earthquake toppled the building's bell tower, which had survived the 1863 earthquake, rendering the cathedral towerless until 1958. During the Philippine Revolution of 1896, Archbishop Bernardino Nozaleda y Villa opened the cathedral to Spanish soldiers who sought refuge. During the Philippine–American War, invading American troops converted the cathedral into a hospital for their wounded soldiers.

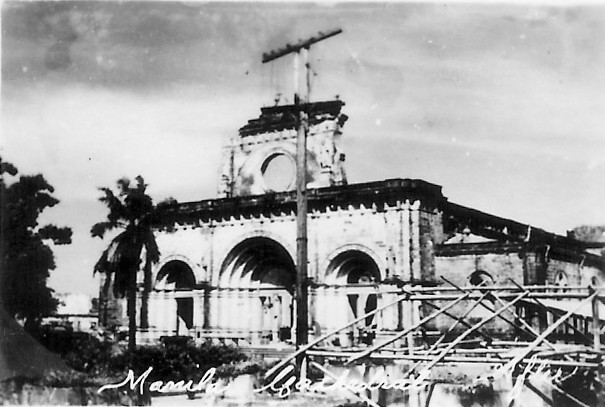
The cathedral ruins after the war. Only the façade is standing in this photo.

In 1937, the International Eucharistic Congress was held in the Philippines; Manila Cathedral played a role in promoting teachings and devotion to the Blessed Sacrament. To commemorate the event, a cathedral stamp and medal were unveiled, made by the official manufacturer of medals for the Congress of the Philippines sculptor Críspulo Zamora.

In 1945, during the Battle of Manila, American and Imperial Japanese forces exchanged mortar and artillery fire near the seventh cathedral, which was later almost entirely destroyed in a Japanese scorched-earth defense. Japanese forces also reportedly murdered civilians hiding inside the cathedral, as part of their destruction and the larger Manila massacre.

=== Eighth cathedral (1958–present) ===
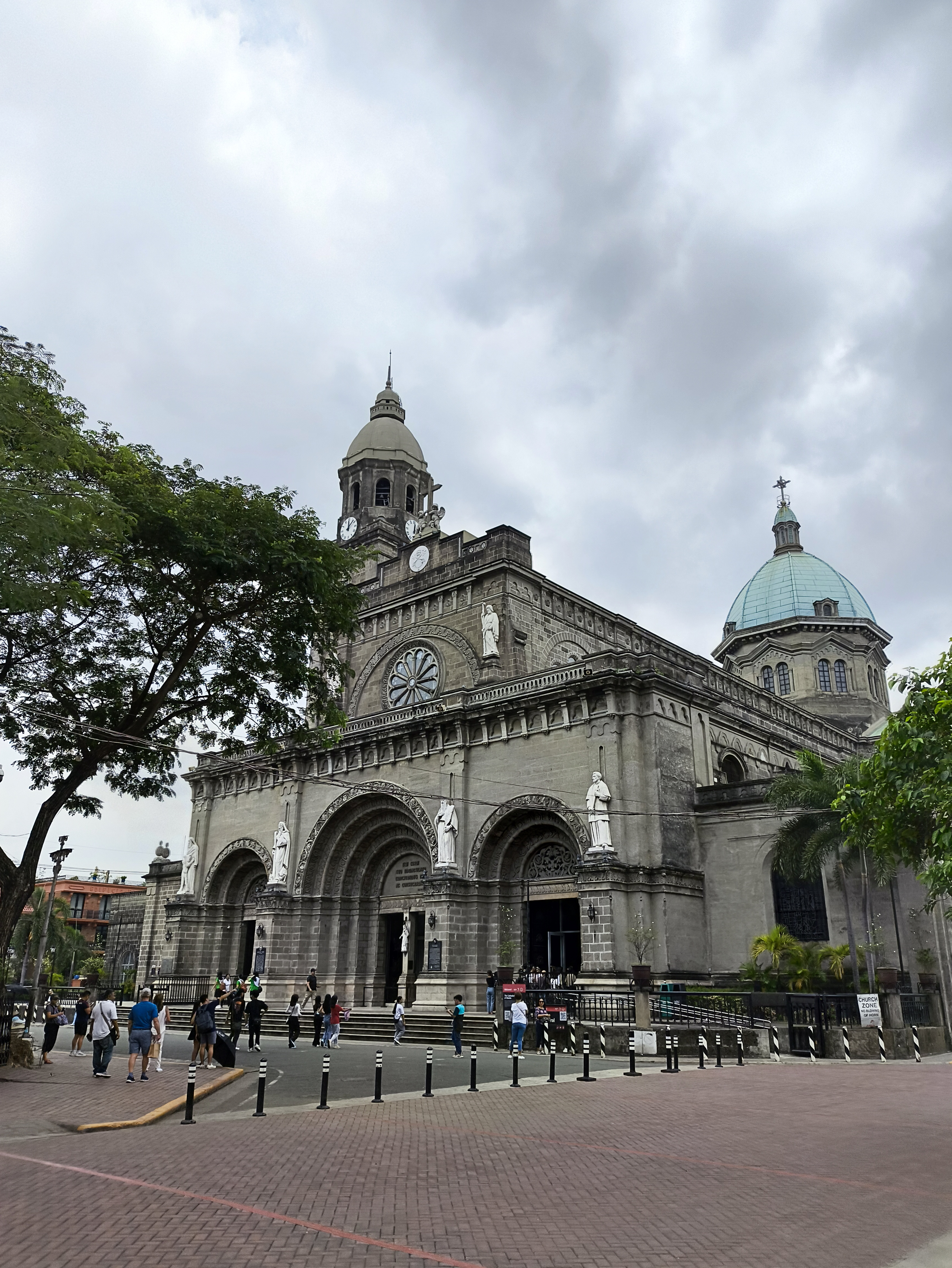
The eighth and present cathedral structure, viewed from the right of the main façade

After the Second World War, archbishops Michael J. O'Doherty and Gabriel Reyes both considered transferring the see of the Archdiocese of Manila to Mandaluyong. The plan was abandoned when the cathedral was rebuilt by Cardinal Rufino Santos, under the supervision of Kapampangan architect Fernando Ocampo. The first cornerstone of the eighth cathedral was blessed and laid by Cardinal Fernando Quiroga Palacios, the Archbishop of Santiago de Compostela and papal legate of Pope Pius XII, on December 8, 1954. The building was consecrated on December 7, 1958, and the high altar was consecrated on December 10 that year.

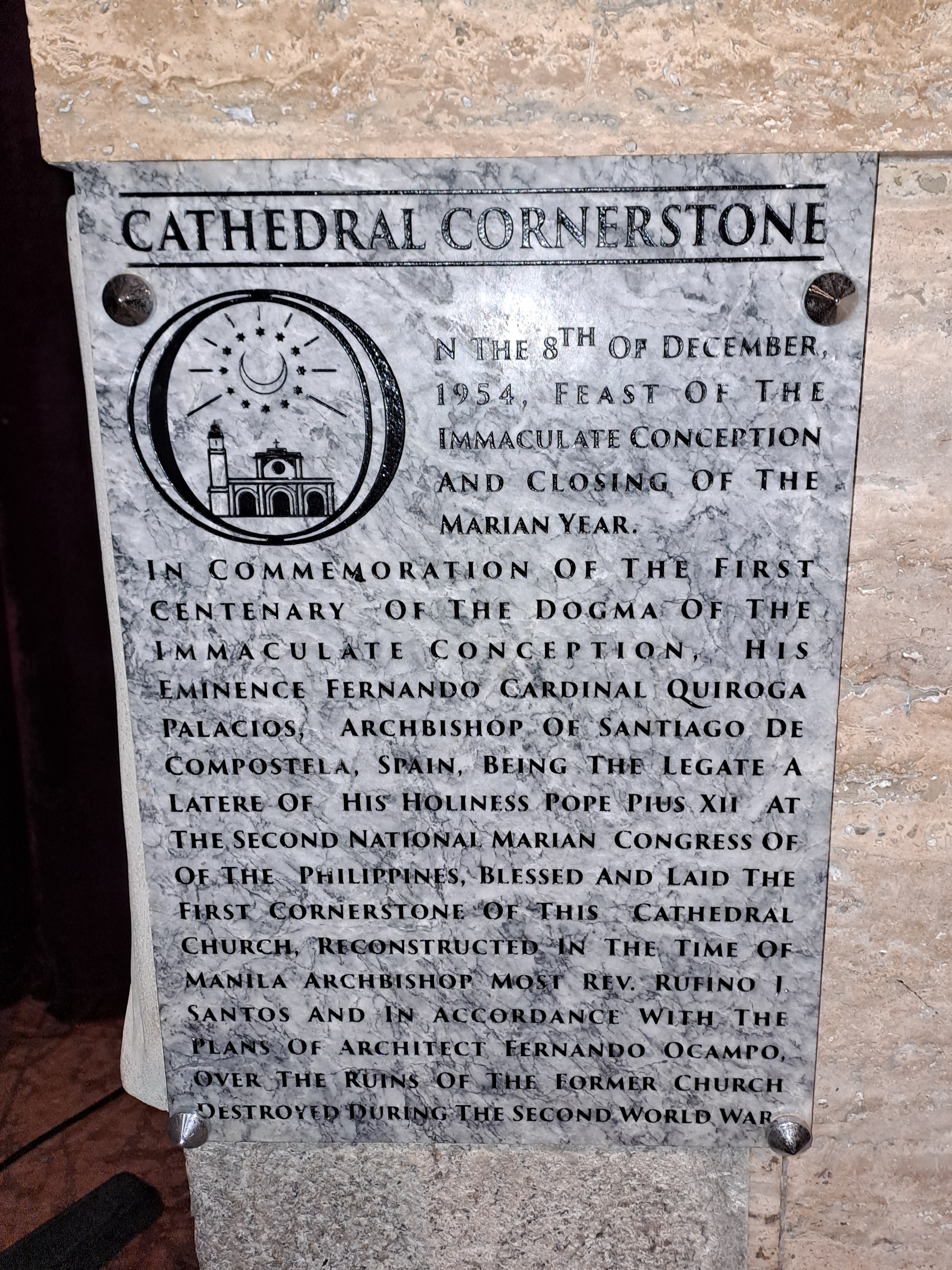
Marker identifying the location of the cornerstone of the present eighth structure laid in 1954. It was unveiled on April 27, 2022, the 41st anniversary of the cathedral's elevation to a minor basilica.

Pope Paul VI made an apostolic visit and celebrated Mass at the cathedral on November 27, 1970. Pope John Paul II also celebrated Mass in the cathedral on February 17, 1981, during his first papal visit to the country, and issued a papal bull Quod Ipsum Manilensis elevating the cathedral to the rank of a minor basilica through his own motu proprio on April 27, 1981. In the same papal bull, John Paul II restated Paul VI's papal decree of June 6, 1968, should be eternally preserved and enforced to the merits and titles of the cathedral as its own basilica.

The golden jubilee of the Manila Cathedral's postwar restoration was celebrated in 2008 with the second Manila Cathedral Pipe Organ Festival from December 2 to 10, organized by the Catholic Bishops' Conference of the Philippines.

In February 2011, the cathedral's bells were lowered to ground level to prevent the bell tower from collapsing like earlier towers in past earthquakes. In January 2012, the bells were replaced with new ones cast by blacksmith Friedrich Wilhelm Schilling from Heidelberg, Germany, in 1958. According to the new marker installed by Cardinal Gaudencio Rosales, then the archbishop, the newly installed bells are the largest bells that are in active use in the Philippines. Seven carillon bells weighing 17 metric tons (17 long tons) were permanently installed in the ground level of the belfry. (Note: Official Stone Marker at the Manila Cathedral. Publicly installed by Cardinal Gaudencio Rosales, former Archbishop of Manila (2011). Located on the left side of the front door of the Basilica.)

==== Restoration (2012–2014) ====
In 2010, the cathedral failed the standards of the National Structural Code of the Philippines as cracks were detected in some critical sections. After Cardinal Luis Antonio Tagle became Archbishop of Manila in December 2011, one of his first decisions was to close the cathedral. Following the 2012 Negros earthquake and structural concerns, the cathedral temporarily closed on February 7 for repairs, earthquake retrofitting and subsidence prevention. During this time, Paco Church was designated the pro-cathedral of the Archdiocese of Manila.

Restoration was expected to be completed in 2013, but the initial deadline was missed. The cathedral rector at the time, Monsignor Nestor Cerbo, stated that renovations would be finished by March 25, 2014. New features included closed-circuit television (CCTV) cameras, large, flat-screen television screens, improved audio-video systems, and improved interior and exterior LED lights. Restoration finished on the planned date and the Manila Cathedral was reopened to the general public on April 9, 2014. Tagle celebrated a Mass that was attended by President Benigno Aquino III.

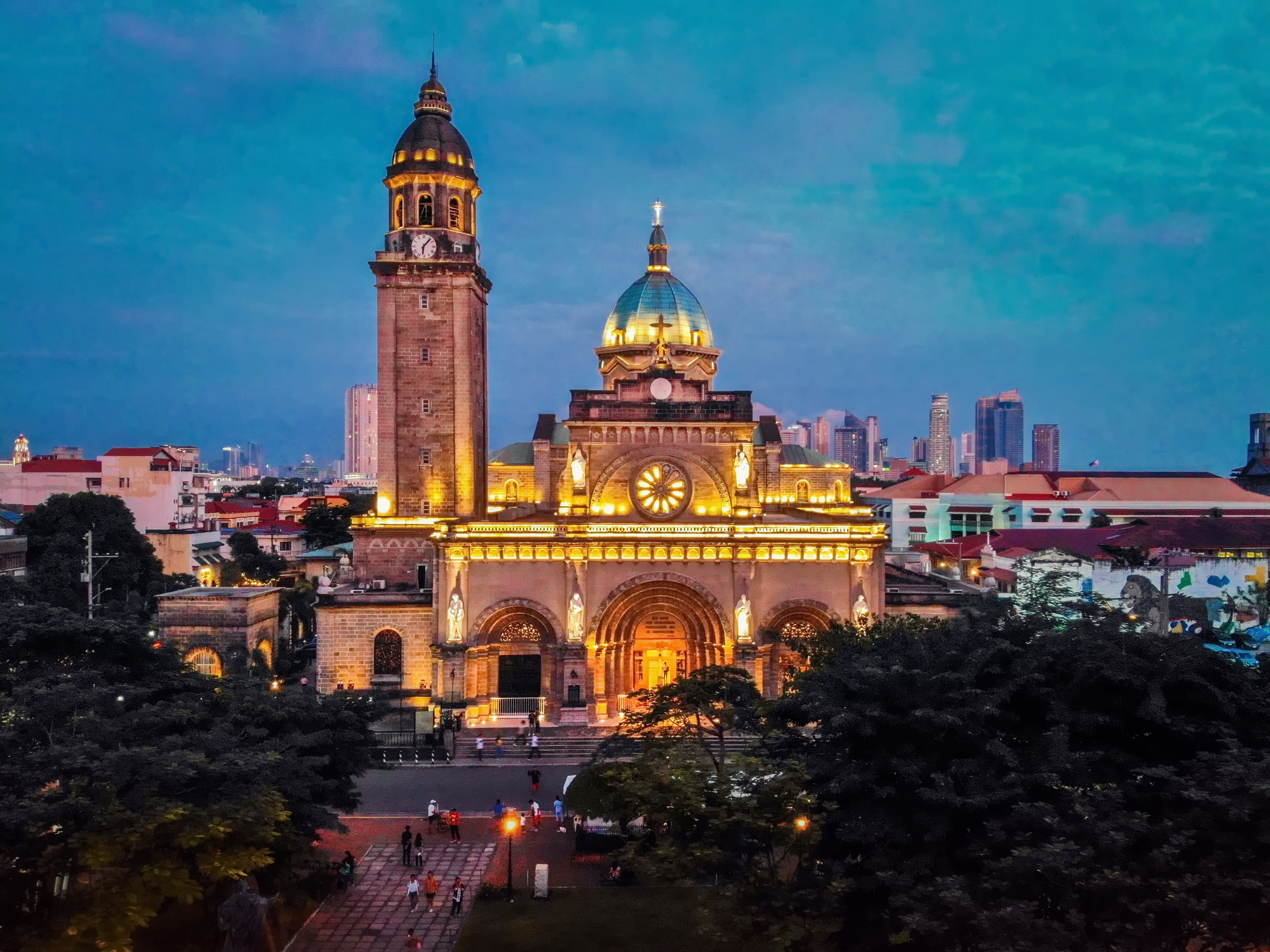
The cathedral and surrounding skyline at night, September 2019

On January 16, 2015, Pope Francis celebrated his first Papal Mass in the Philippines at the cathedral as part of his apostolic visit to the country. Due to safety considerations, the Mass was closed to the public, accommodating only 2,000 bishops, priests, and religious persons.

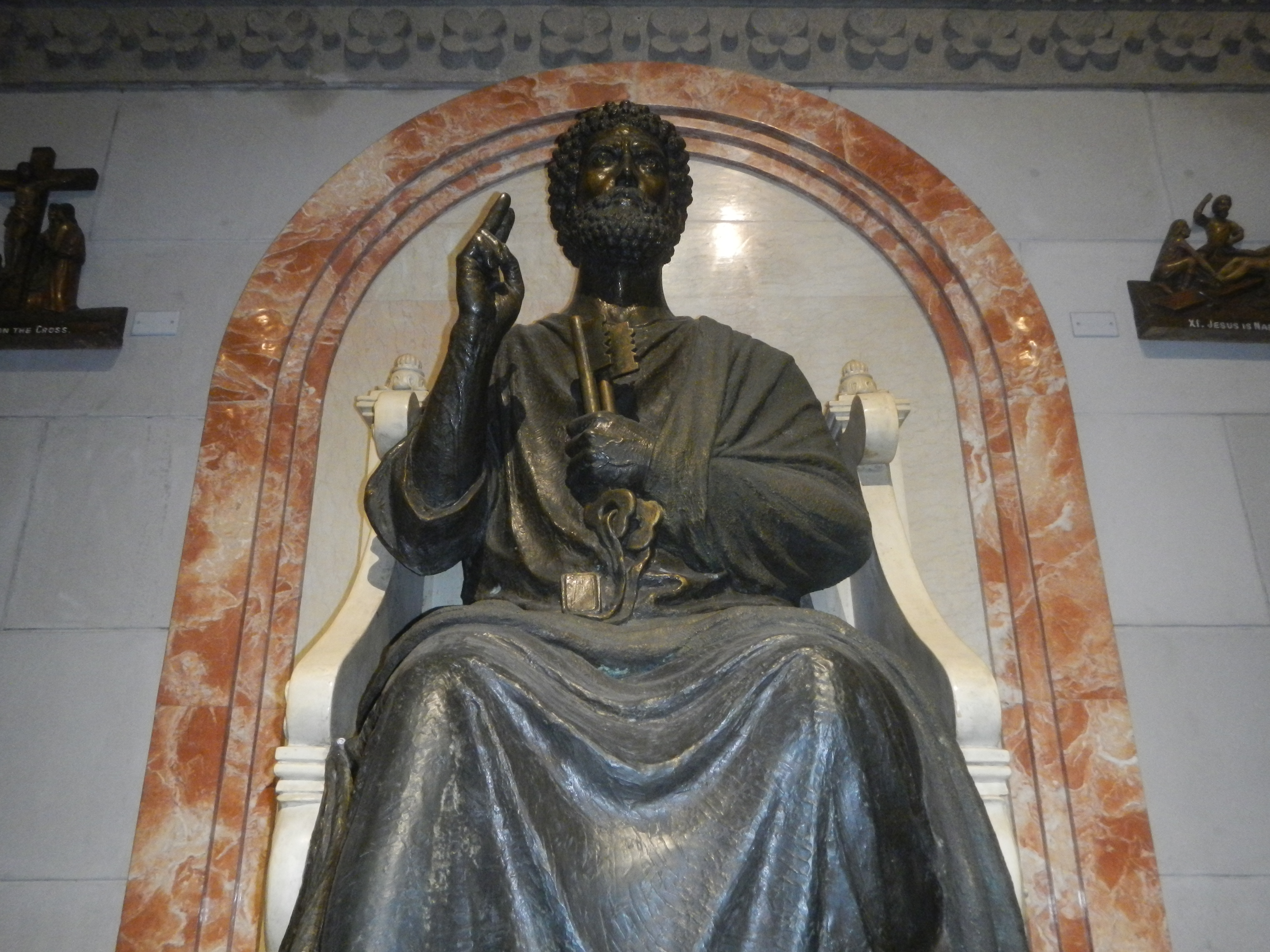
Replica of Saint Peter's statue in Saint Peter's Basilica

==== 60th post-war restoration anniversary (2017–2018) ====
The year-long celebrations commemorating the 60th anniversary of the Manila Cathedral's post-war restoration began with the opening of a historical exhibit on December 8, 2017. On December 18, the cathedral received a first-class blood relic of Pope St. John Paul II. On October 27, 2018, Pope Francis appointed Cardinal Thomas Aquino Manyo Maeda, then-Archbishop of Osaka, as his papal legate for this occasion. In a letter to Cardinal Maeda on December 1, Francis called the cathedral the "mother and head of the churches" in the Philippines. The pope further wrote in his letter:

"Indeed, this temple which has truly undergone great changes, destroyed seven times by earthquakes and other calamities through the centuries, was diligently rebuilt again and again by the faithful. Finally after being shattered by the Second World War, it was rebuilt from the ruins at the Lord's bidding."

— Pope Francis

Cardinal Maeda celebrated a fiesta Mass on December 8, 2018, concelebrated with Cardinal Luis Antonio Tagle (then-Archbishop of Manila), Cardinal Gaudencio Rosales (Archbishop-Emeritus of Manila), and Archbishop Gabriele Giordano Caccia (then-Apostolic Nuncio to the Philippines). The pope, through Cardinal Maeda, imparted his apostolic blessing to the cathedral. On December 10, 2018, Cardinal Tagle rededicated the altar in accordance with the rites prescribed by the Second Vatican Council; the rededication Mass was concelebrated by several bishops comprising the Catholic Bishops' Conference of the Philippines (CBCP), including its president at the time and the Archbishop of Davao, Romulo Valles, and Cardinal Orlando Quevedo, Archbishop-Emeritus of Cotabato.

== Architecture and design ==
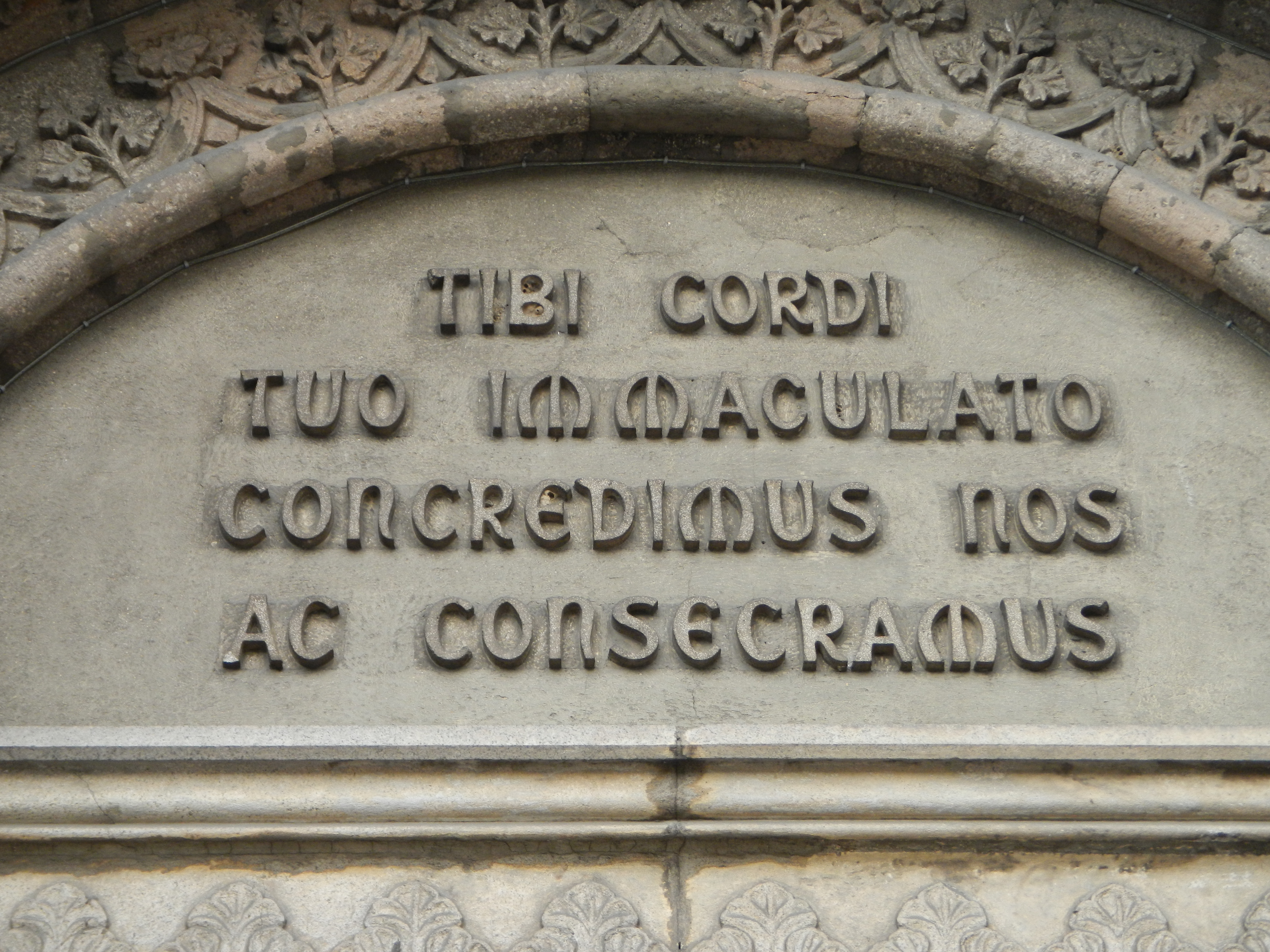
Inscription on the tympanum of the main portal

The Manila Cathedral was built in the Latin cross (cruciform) layout. Its northwest façade, which is built in the Neo-Romanesque architecture style, is a replica of the façade of the previous cathedral, along with statues of famous saints sculpted in Roman travertine stone. Several of the artworks inside the basilica were made by Italian artists. In the previous cathedral, the statues were originally made of molave wood. The statue of Rose of Lima was sculpted by Angelo Fattinanzi; James the Great, Andrew and Anthony the Abbot were sculpted by Livia Papini; and Francis Xavier and Polycarp were sculpted by Álcide Tico. It is traditional to crown and adorn the statue of Rose of Lima with flowers and roses on her feast day.

Eight bronze panels sculpted by Alessandro Monteleone and Francesco Nagni dominate the central northwest doors of the cathedral. Each panel is 1.8 meters (5 ft 11 in) wide and 4.24 meters (13.9 ft) tall, depicting bas-reliefs of the important events in the cathedral's history. The tympanum above the central doors bears the Latin inscription Tibi cordi tuo immaculato concredimus nos ac consecramus ("To thine Immaculate Heart, we entrust and consecrate ourselves"). Two smaller doors on the left and right sides also have eight panels each, depicting various titles and invocations to the Blessed Virgin Mary.

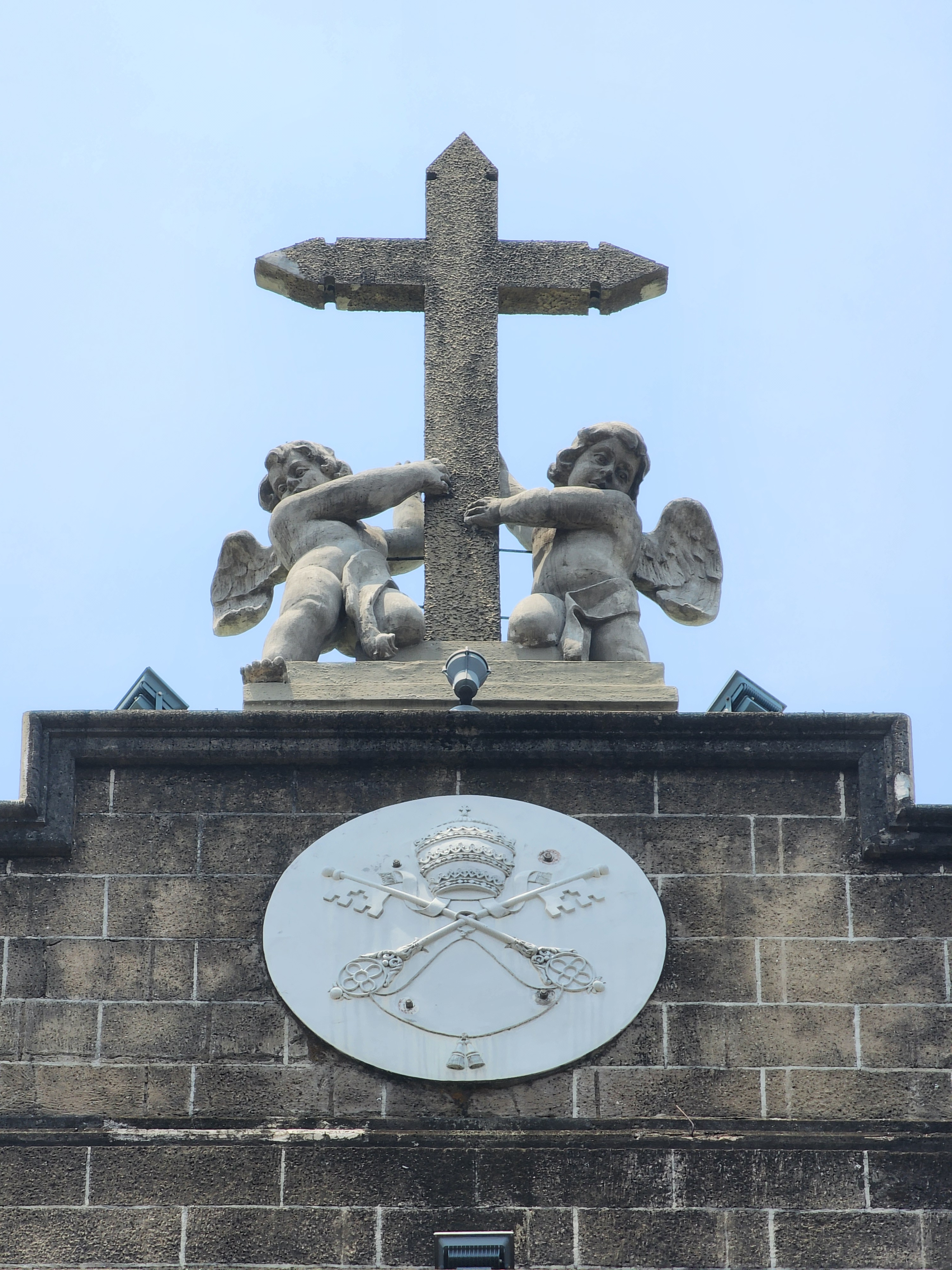
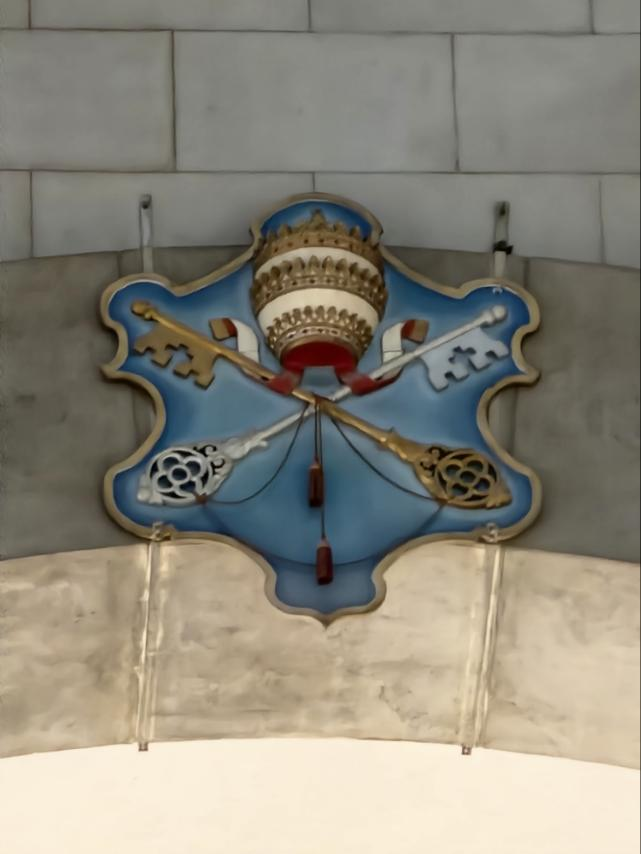
The papal arms were added in 1981 to signify the cathedral's status as a basilica.

Since Pope John Paul II's apostolic visit to the basilica in 1981, a medallion bearing the papal arms has been placed beneath the cross of the façade and at the crossing above the high altar. As is customary, the scarlet galeris of the deceased Cardinals Rufino Santos and Jaime Sin are hung from the dome's ceiling. A copy of the statue of St. Peter's Basilica titled Saint Peter Enthroned is placed across a polychrome, life-sized statue of the titiular, the Immaculate Conception.

The bronze baptismal font and angel-shaped holy water fonts were made by Publio Morbiducci. The prominent mosaic of Jude Thaddeus was made by Marcello Mazzoli. In 1964, Filipino artist Galo Ocampo designed and made most of the cathedral's 134 modern stained glass windows.

The marble floors on the center aisle near the altar bears the coats of arms of four cardinal-archbishops of Manila: Rufino Santos, Jaime Sin, Gaudencio Rosales, and Luis Antonio Tagle.

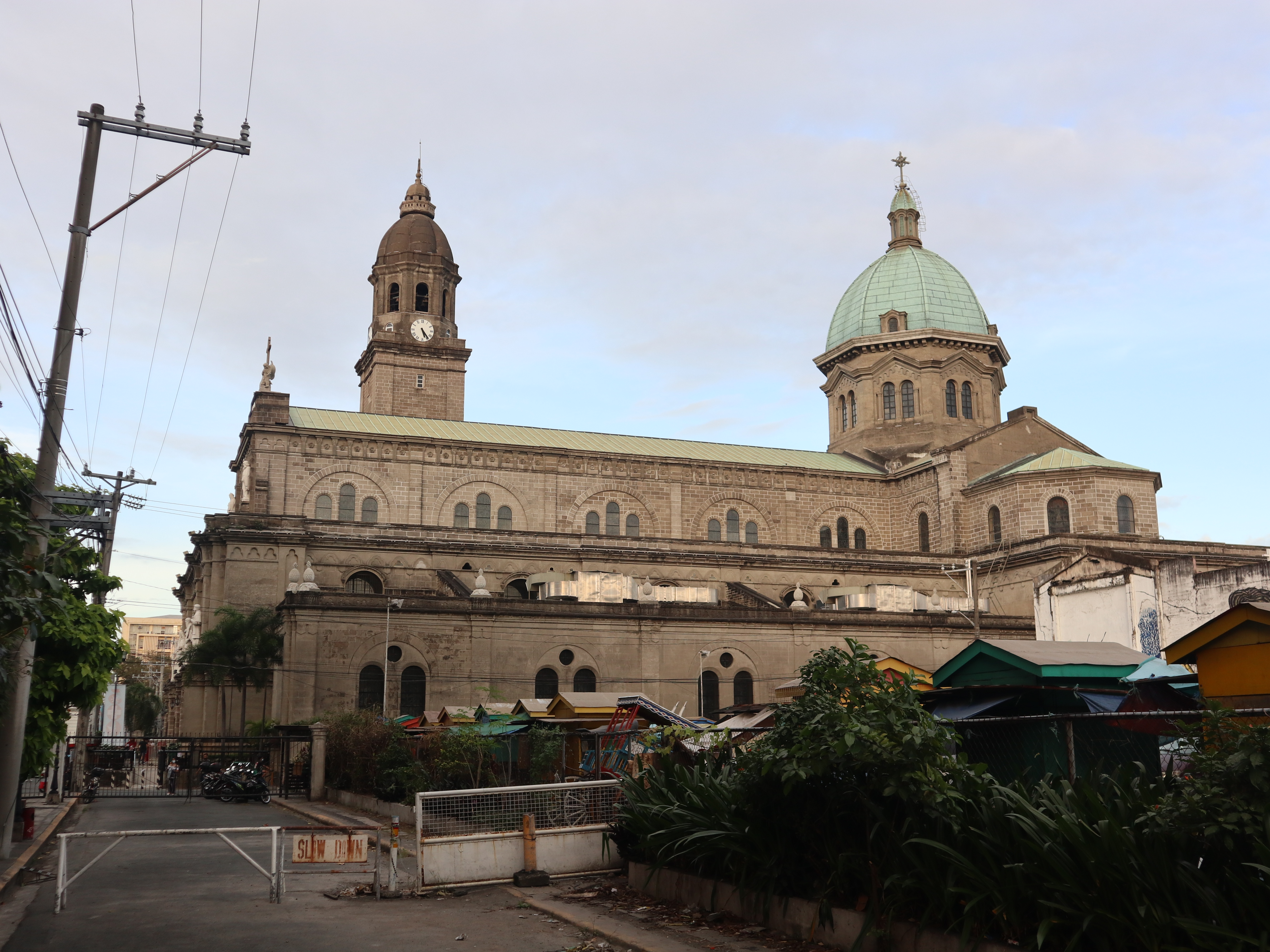
Right side view of the façade, showing the patinated dome surmounted by a four-armed cross

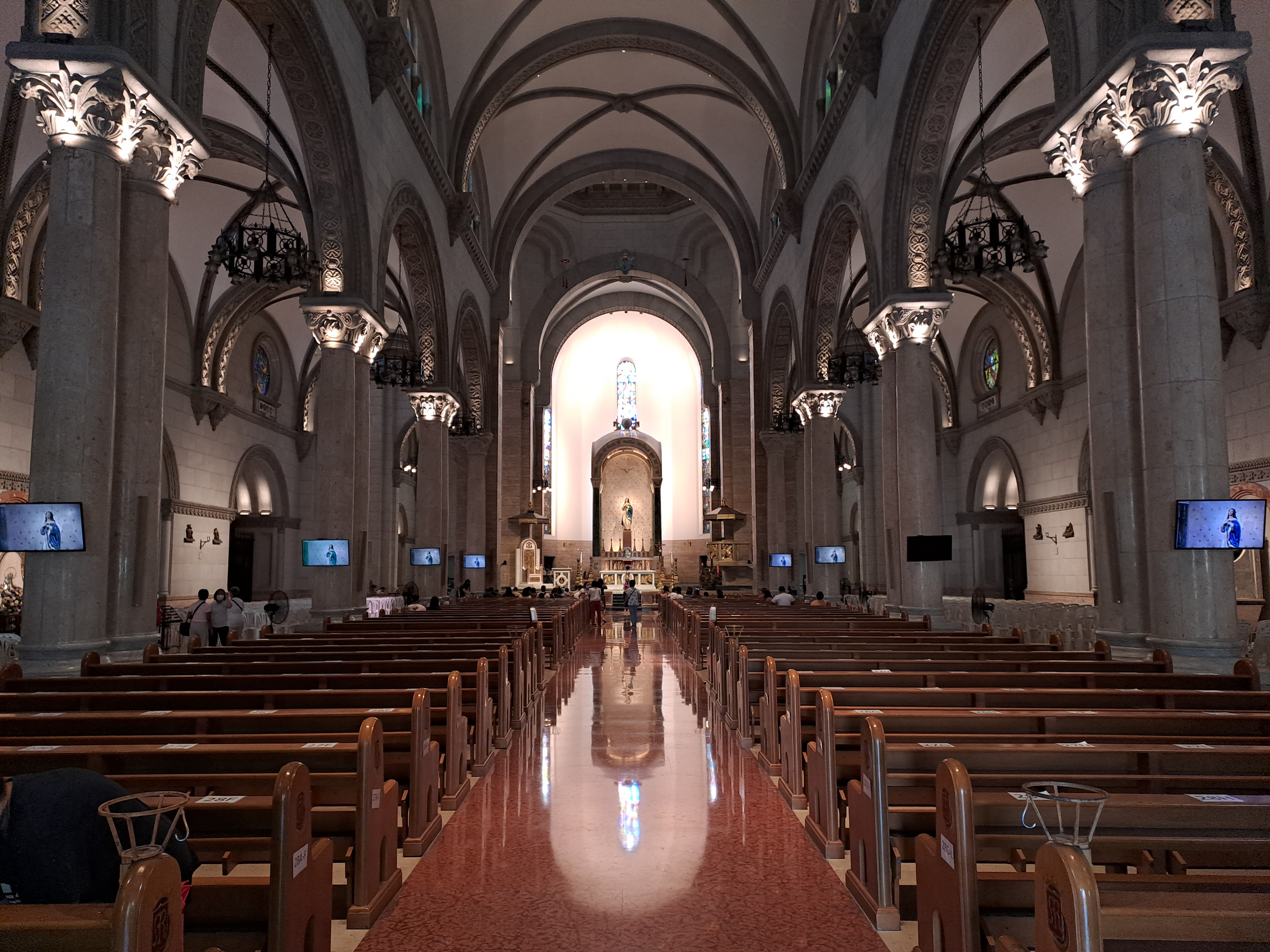
The central nave, looking towards the sanctuary

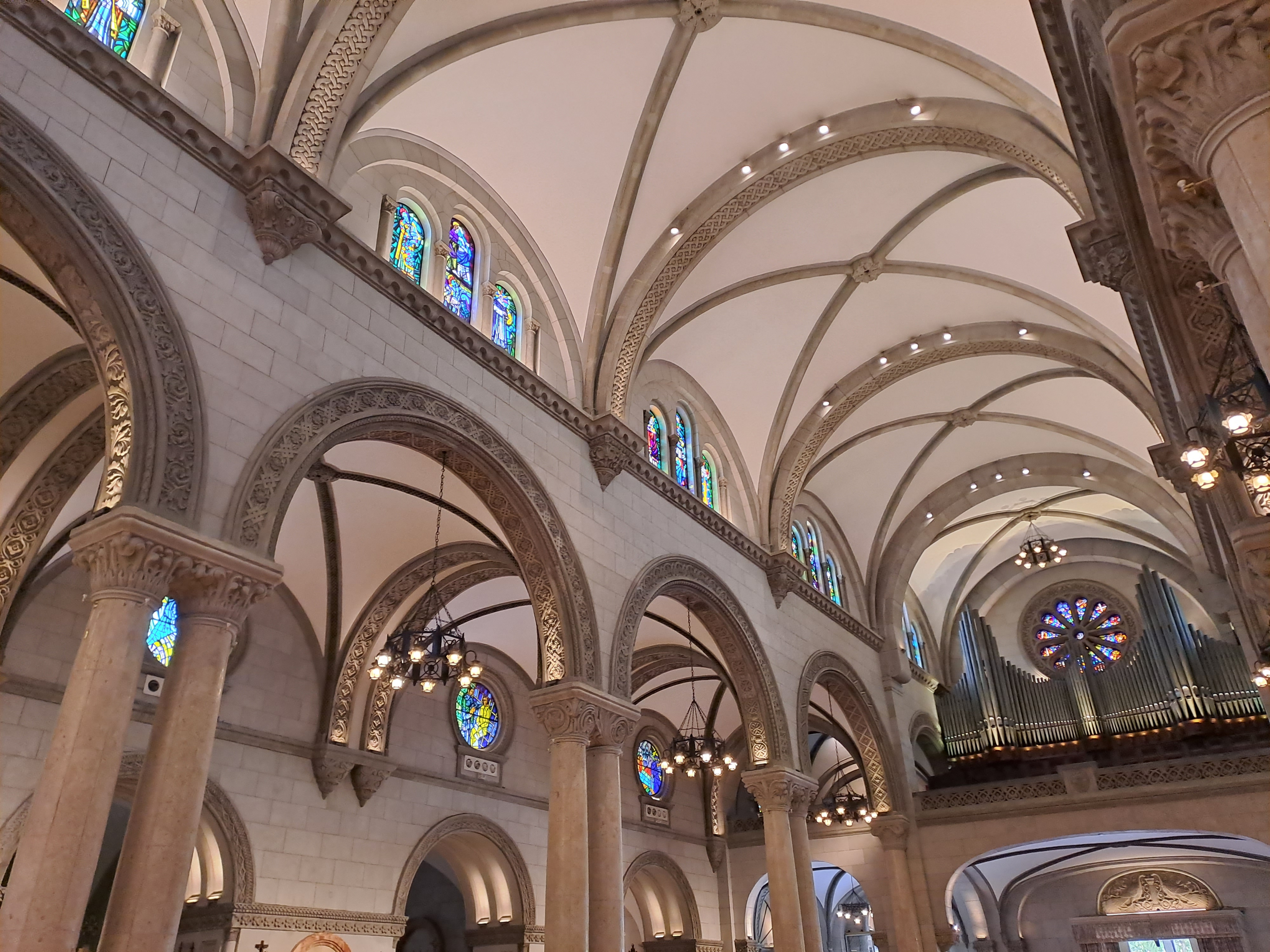
Rib vaults and clerestory, looking towards the choir loft and organ

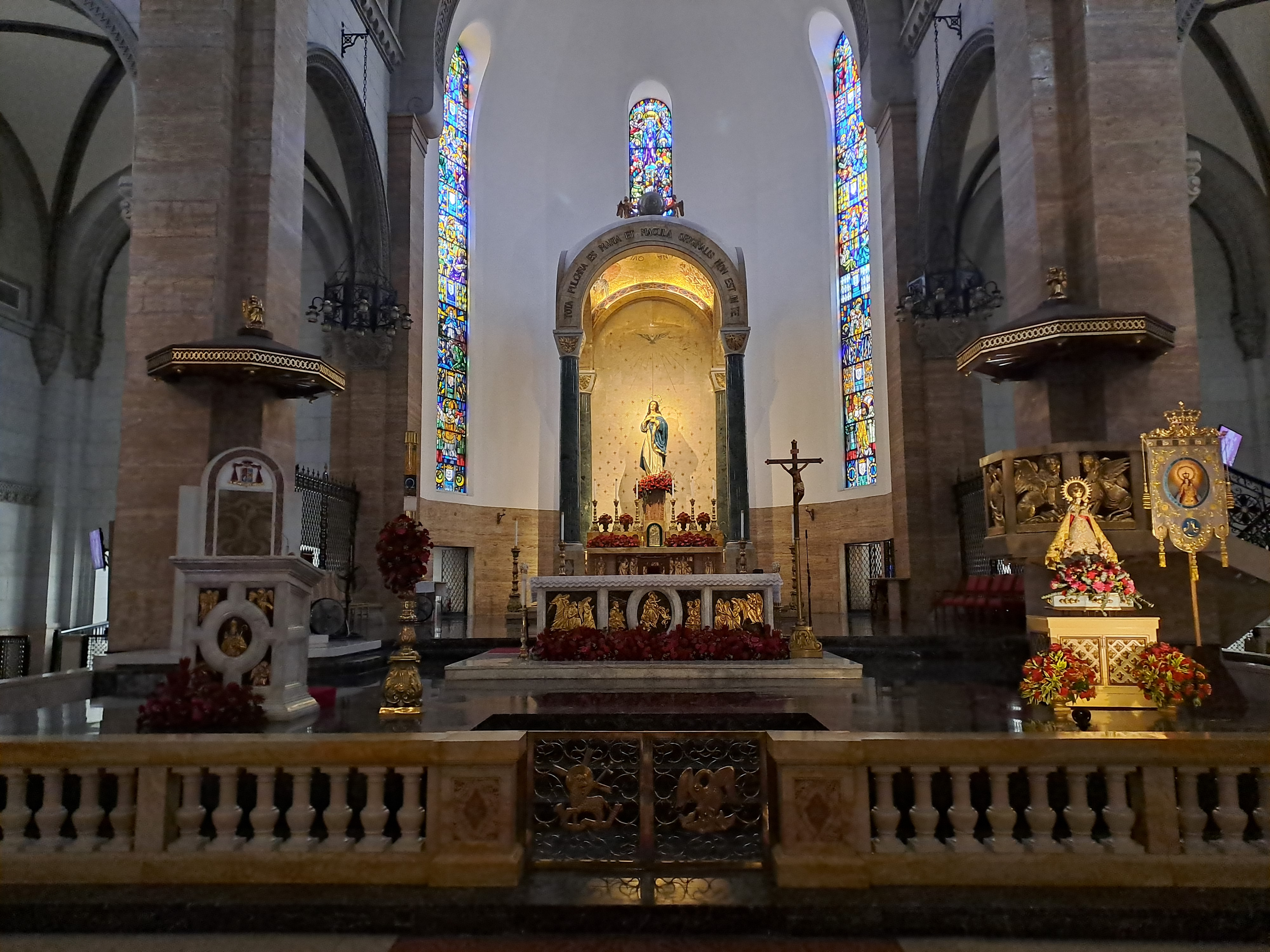
The cathedra, newer high altar, pulpit, altar rail, and the ciborium

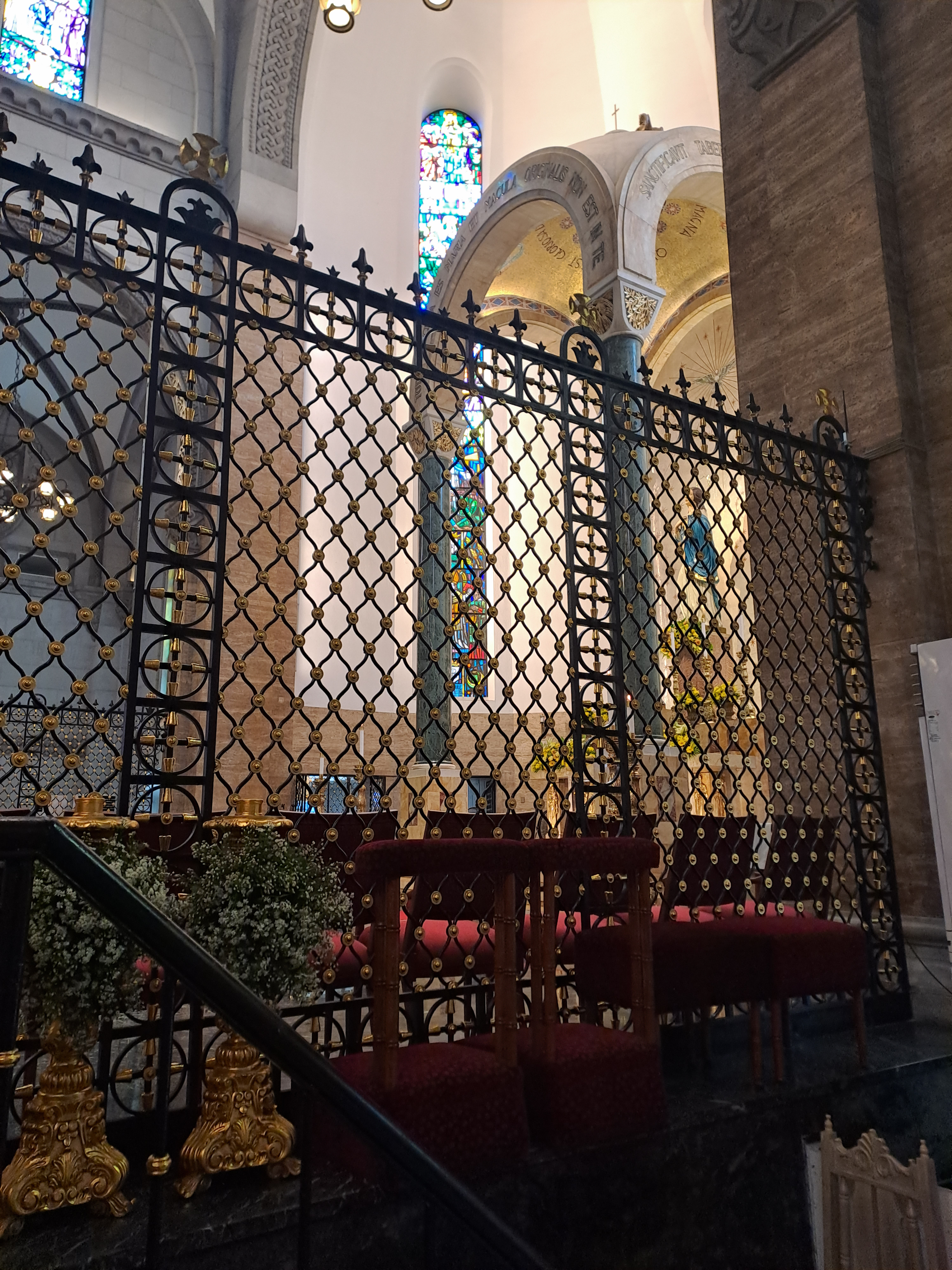
Iron reja

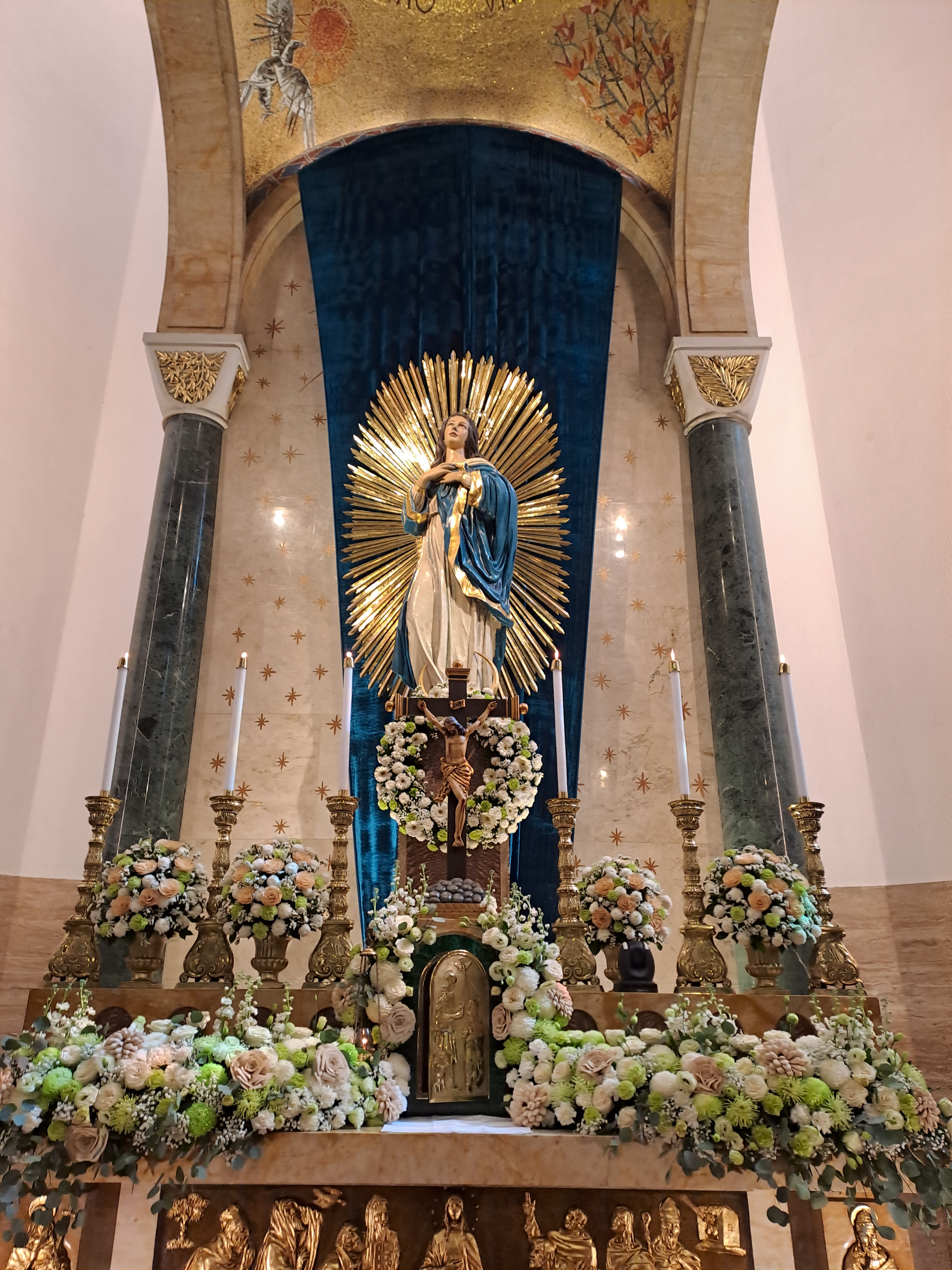
The older high altar and the image of the Immaculate Conception

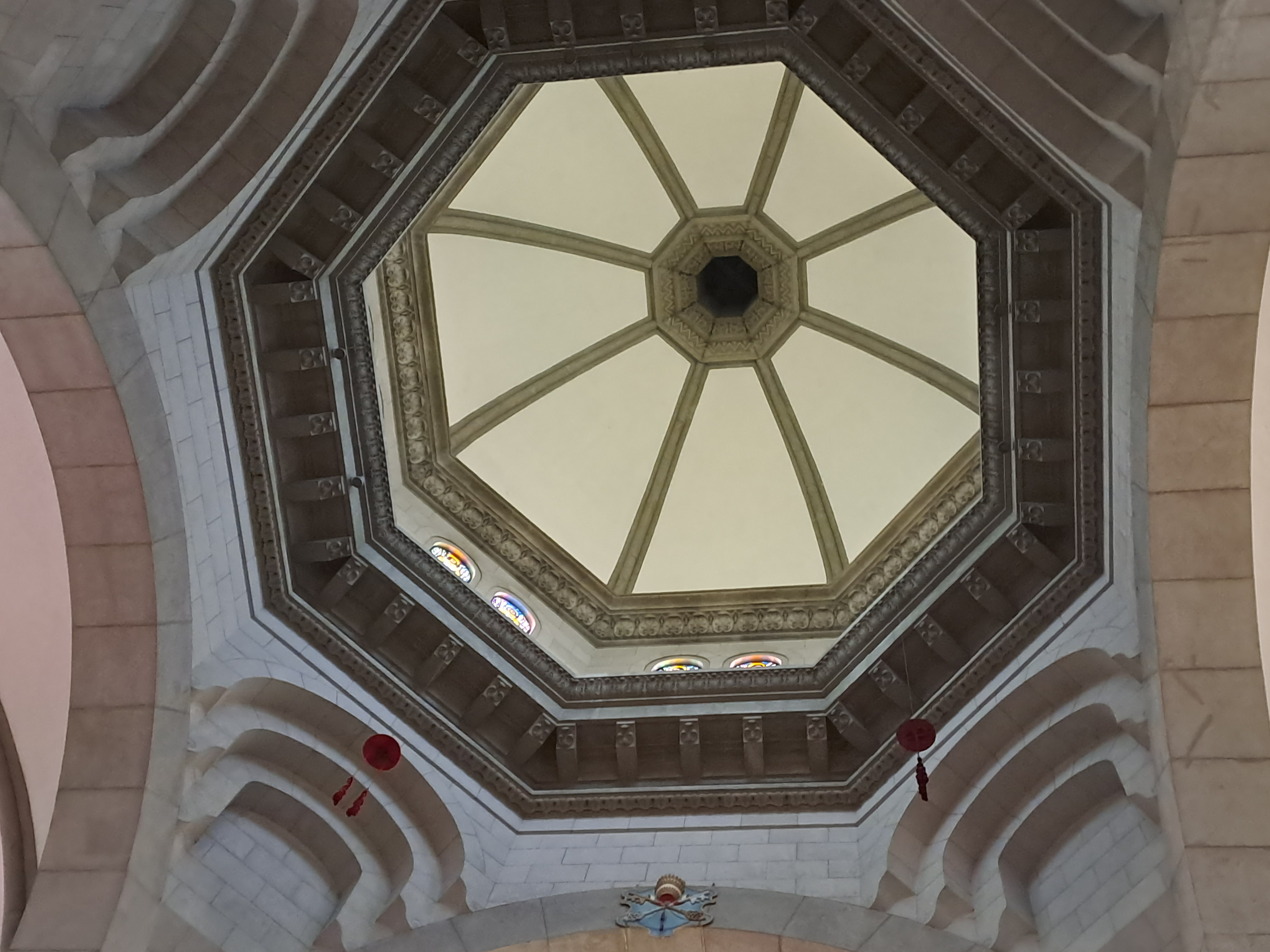
Interior of the dome, with the suspended galeri of Cardinals Rufino Santos and Jaime Sin

=== Cathedra ===
The cathedra or episcopal throne of the Archbishop of Manila was installed in 1958 during the postwar reconstruction. It is made of Mexican onyx and marble from Carrara, Italy, and was designed and made by the Istituto Internazionale d’Arte Liturgica in Rome. The original cathedra bears the coat of arms of Rufino Santos before he was created a cardinal. His coat of arms and the Mexican onyx were covered by a stone slab until their restoration in 2021.

The restored cathedra bears a carving of the coat of arms of Cardinal Jose Advincula, the present archbishop, on top of white Indian marble.

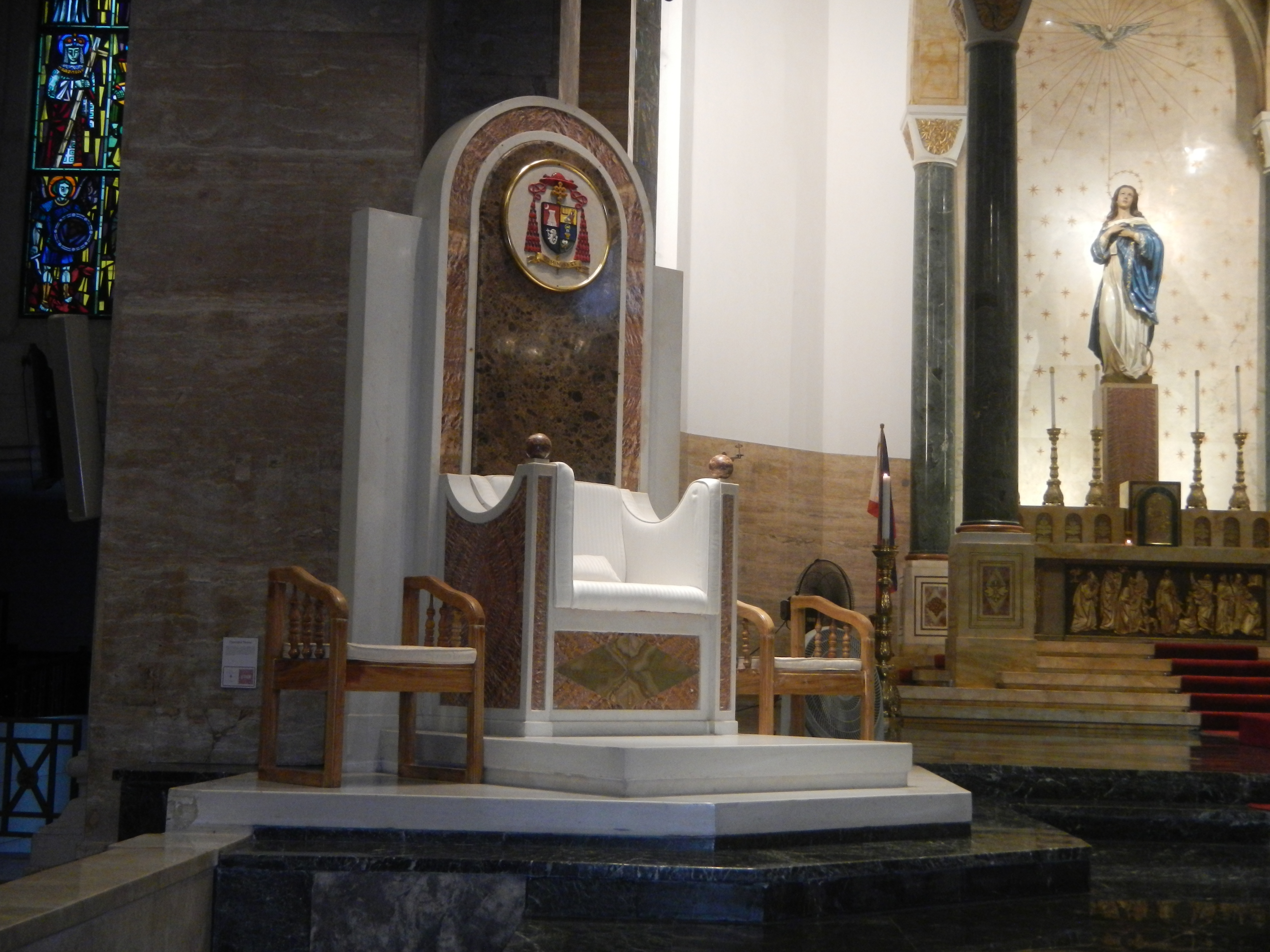
With the coat of arms of Cardinal Luis Antonio Tagle before the 2021 restoration

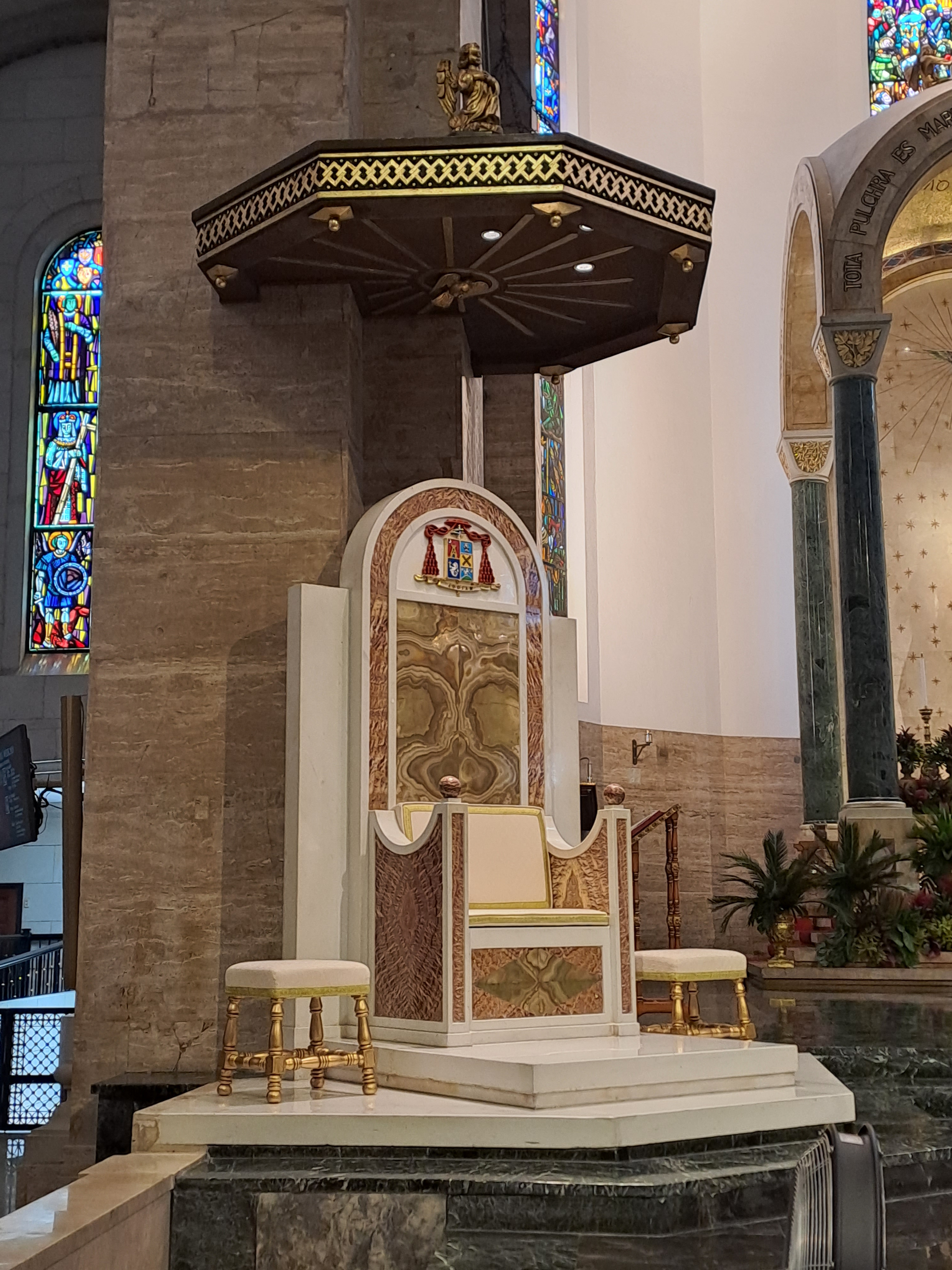
Restored cathedra with the coat of arms of Cardinal Jose Advincula in April 2023

=== Pipe Organ ===
The cathedral's pipe organ was built by the Dutch organ builder Pels & Zoon in 1958. It went through major restoration in 2025 with the addition of 862 new pipes, and the installation of the brand-new, customized Monarke Cavaillé-Coll pipe organ console manufactured by Dutch organ builder Johannus Organ in the Netherlands. Currently, it consists of 6,446 pipes; it remains the largest pipe organ in Southeast Asia.

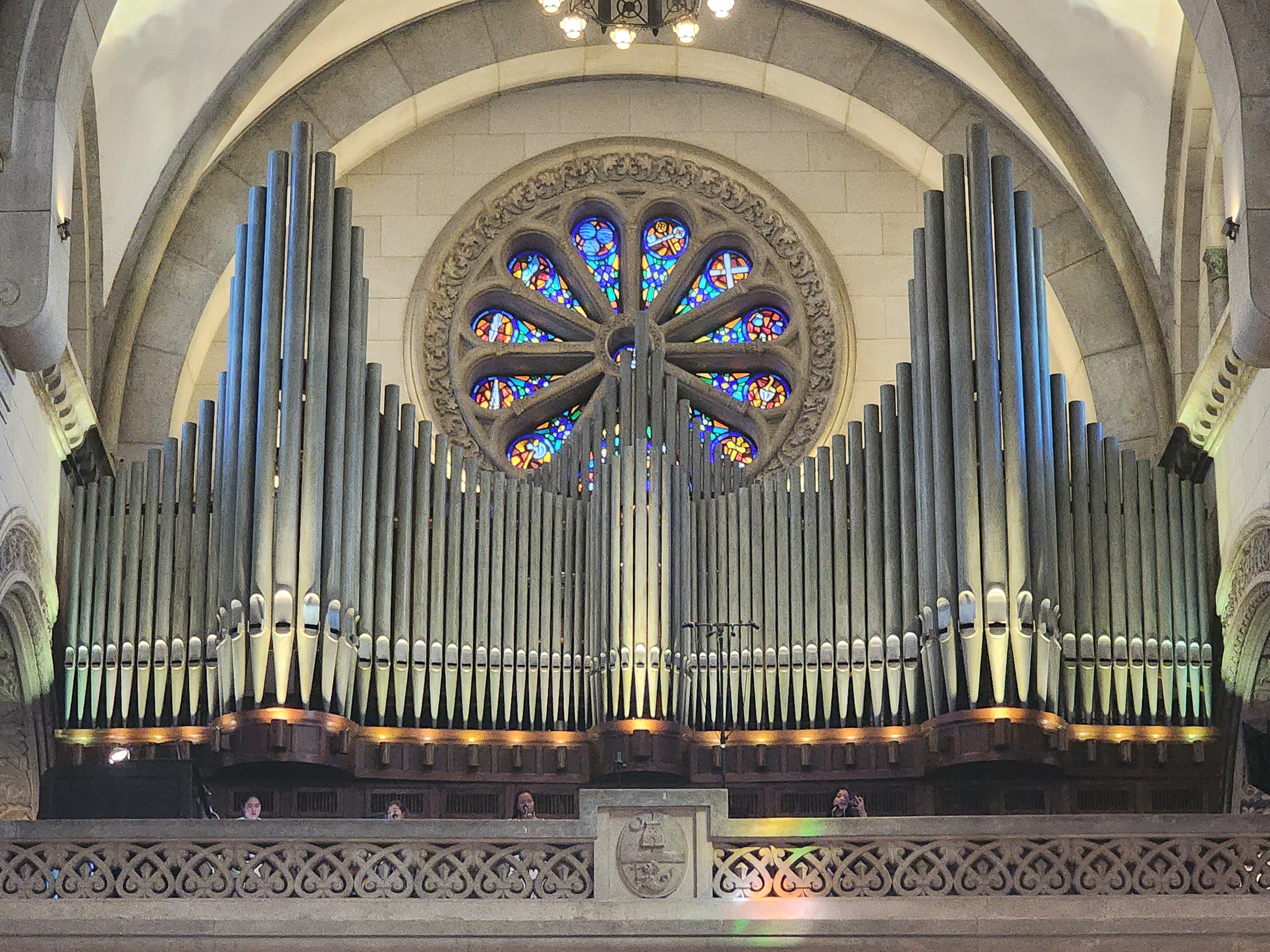
Pipe organ and rose window

== Patroness ==
Manila Cathedral is dedicated to the Blessed Virgin Mary under the title of the Immaculate Conception, who is honored as the Principal Patroness of the Philippines. The 9-foot (2.7 m) bronze statue, which was designed by Italian sculptor Vincenzo Assenza (1915–1981), is located above the high altar.

Prior to 1988, the bronze statue was painted gold, though the twelve star halo-aureola is made of gold. Inscribed on the baldachin above the statue of the Immaculate Conception is the Latin antiphon Tota pulchra es, Maria, et macula originalis non est in Te ("Thou art all-beautiful, Mary, and the original stain [spot] (of sin) is not in thee").

In 1581, Pope Gregory XIII issued a papal bull consecrating the cathedral building to The Purest and Immaculate Conception of Mary. Miguel López de Legazpi consecrated the City of Manila to Saint Potenciana. Pope Pius XII, on September 12, 1942, reiterated this patronage for the Filipino people to La Purísima Inmaculada Concepción through the papal bull Impositi Nobis Apostolici, while Saint Rose of Lima and Saint Potenciana remained as the secondary patronesses of the Filipino people. The same pope, through "Quidquid ad Dilatandum", reiterated this declaration of patronage on July 16, 1958, through the chancellor of apostolic briefs Gildo Brugnola, who signed and executed the decree.

The cathedral celebrates its liturgical feast every December 8, the Feast of the Immaculate Conception.

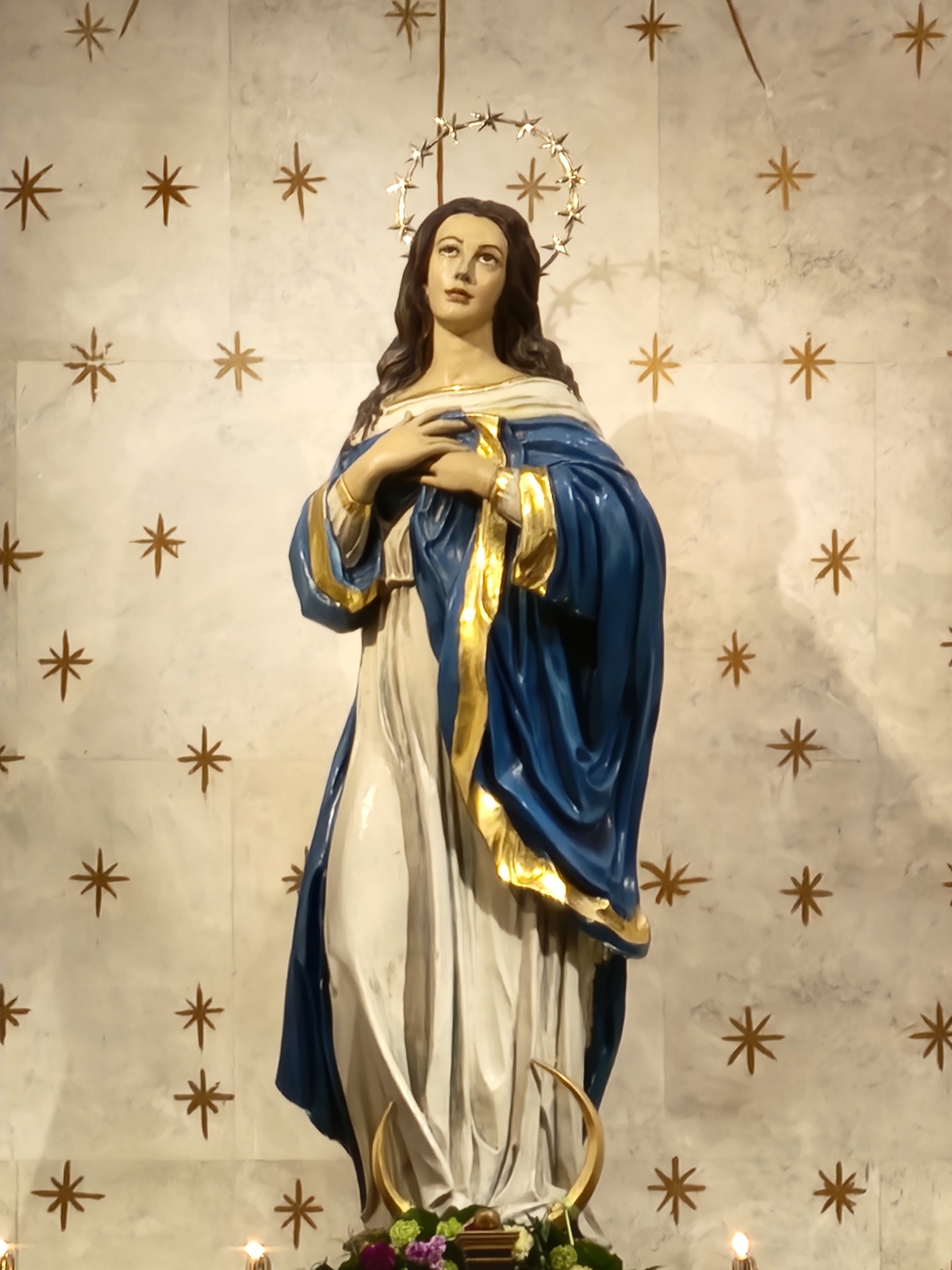
A bronze life-sized polychromed statue of the Immaculate Conception located above the high altar.

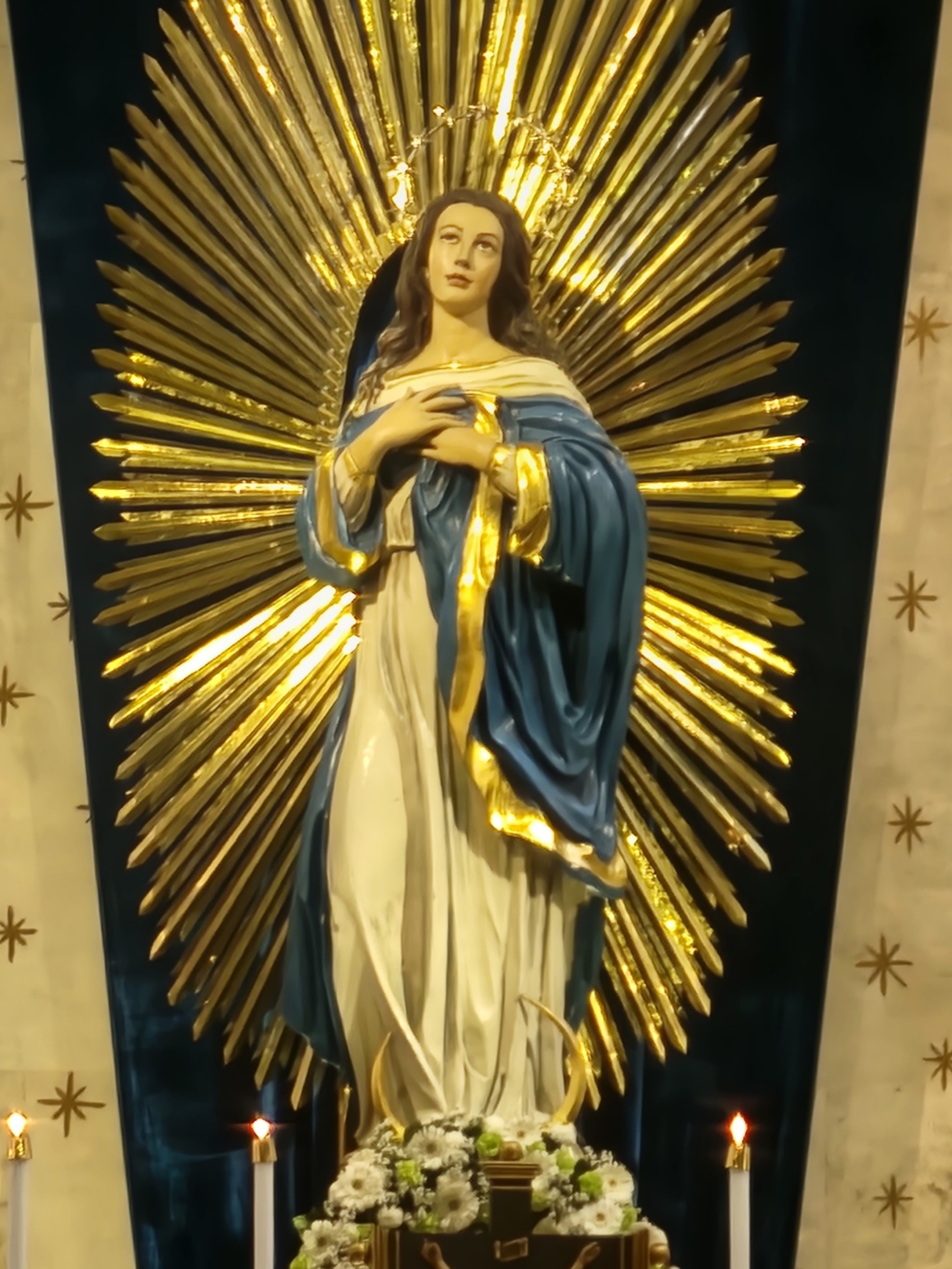
The image decorated with a large aureola for its December 8 feast and the Christmas festivities (2023).

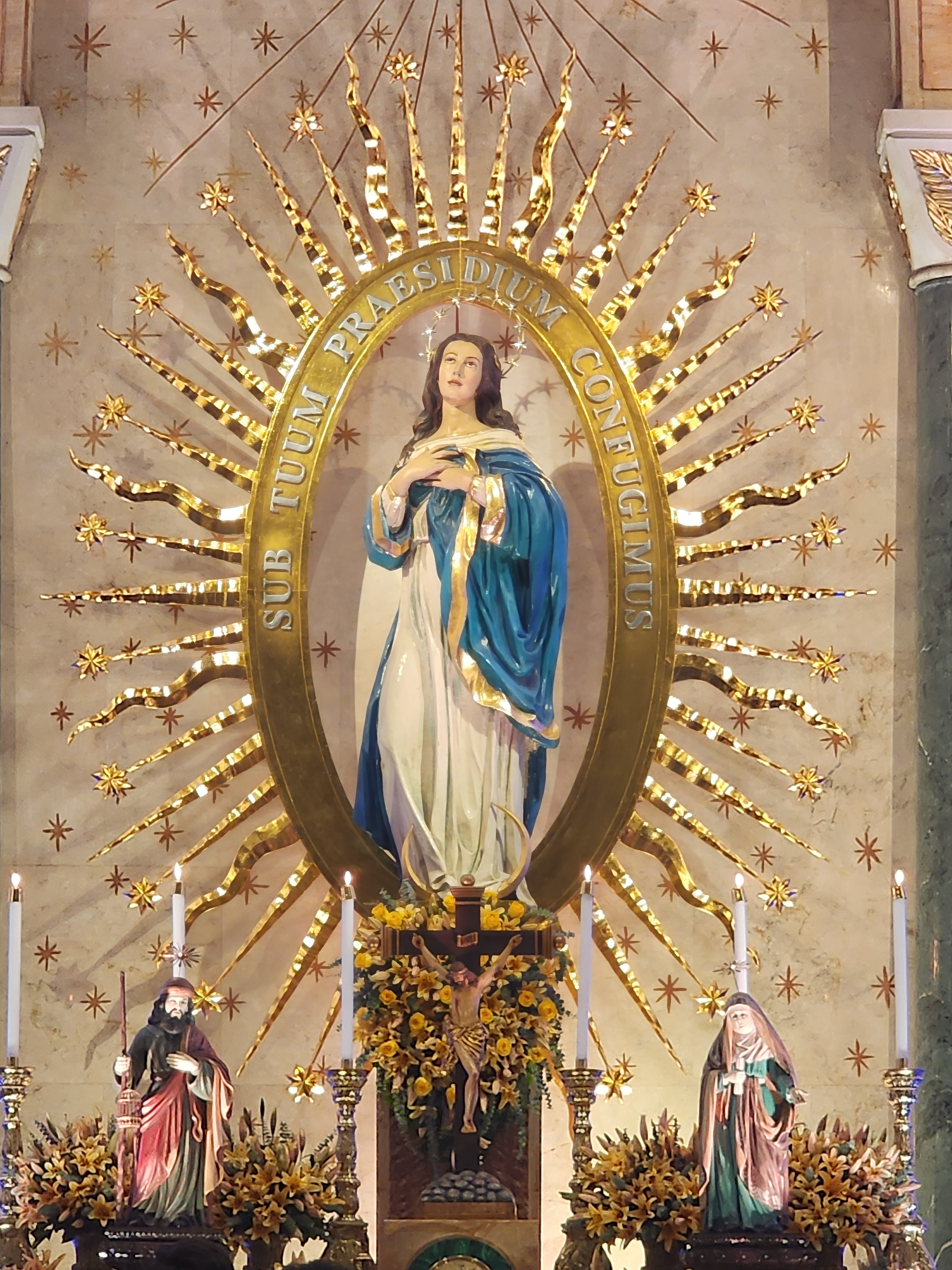
The image decorated for its 2024 fiesta. Inscribed on the aureola is the Latin antiphon Sub tuum praesidium confugimus ("We fly to thy protection, O Holy Mother of God").

== Cathedral rectors ==
- Artemio Gabriel Casas (1956–1962)
- Jose C. Abriol (1962–1975)
- Augusto Pedrosa (1975–1985)
- Domingo A. Cirilos Jr. (1985–1996)
- Hernando M. Coronel (1996–2002)
- Nestor C. Cerbo (2002–2015)
- Reginald R. Malicdem (2015–2022)
- Rolando R. Dela Cruz (2022–present)

== Burials and funerals ==
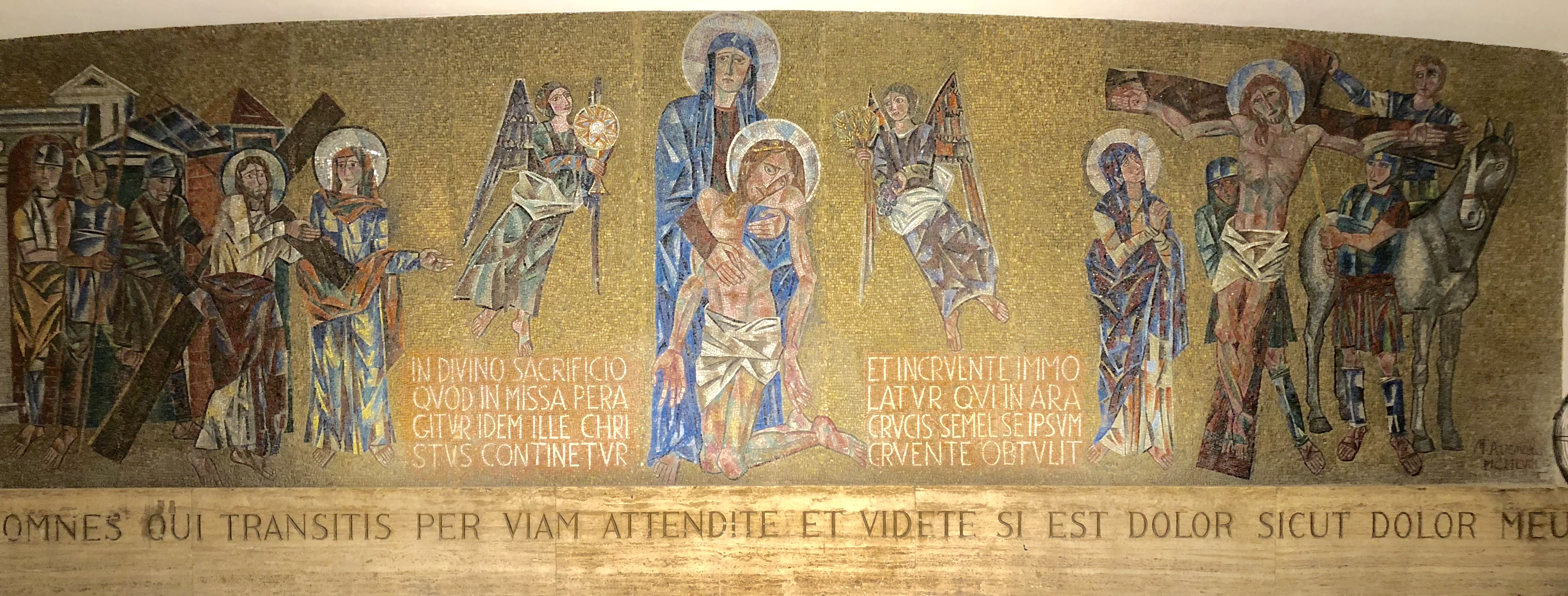
Mosaic in the cathedral's Crypt Chapel of Our Lady of Sorrows. The Latin text at the bottom quotes Lamentations 1:12: Vos omnes qui transitis per viam attendite et videte si est dolor sicut dolor meus. (“O all ye that pass by the way, attend, and see if there be any sorrow like to my sorrow.") Flanking the central Pietà is an excerpt from teachings of the Council of Trent on the Mass. (Note: In divino hoc sacrificio, quod in missa peragitur, idem ille Christus continetur et incruente immolatur, qui in ara crucis semel se ipsum cruente obtulit. ("…[I]n this divine sacrifice which is celebrated in the Mass, that same Christ is contained and immolated in an unbloody manner Who once offered Himself in a bloody manner on the altar of the Cross…").)

The cathedral crypt is the resting place for former Archbishops of Manila and other prelates, whose corpses are located underneath the church complex and accessible by a stairway to the right of the altar:

- Michael J. O'Doherty, the last foreign archbishop of Manila
- Gabriel M. Reyes, the first Filipino archbishop of Manila
- Cardinal Rufino J. Santos, the first Filipino cardinal
- Cardinal Jaime L. Sin, a prominent leader of the 1986 People Power Revolution
- Dom Ambrose Agius, bishop and apostolic delegate to the Philippines (until 1945; remains transferred to the Abbey of Our Lady of Montserrat, Mendiola Street, Manila)

Three former Presidents were permitted to lie in state under the cathedral dome:

- Emilio Aguinaldo, 1st President of the Philippines (1899–1901) (d. 1964)
- Carlos P. Garcia, 8th President of the Philippines (1957–1961) (d. 1971)
- Corazon C. Aquino, 11th President of the Philippines (1986–1992) (d. 2009)

President Aguinaldo was the first president to have a Requiem Mass in the restored cathedral. Although he was a Freemason and was closely associated with the breakaway Aglipayan Church, his remains were taken to the cathedral and laid in state under the dome on February 14, 1964. Cardinal Rufino Santos officiated the Requiem Mass before the remains were taken to the Legislative Building for the state vigil. President Garcia was the first layman to lie in state and have his Requiem at the cathedral; President Aquino was the third layperson and the first woman given this honor during her funeral. These three funerals broke with centuries of tradition that reserved the right of lying in state beneath the dome to Archbishops of Manila alone.

== See also ==
- Manila Cathedral-Basilica Re-Opening (April 9, 2014, Eucharist after Restoration and Retrofitting)
- Archdiocese of Manila
- Catholic Church in the Philippines
- Intramuros
- List of cathedrals in the Philippines
- List of Catholic basilicas
- San Agustin Church
