= 1863 Manila earthquake =

Earthquakes in the Philippines

- Location within Luzon Location within Philippines
- Local date: June 3, 1863
- Local time: 19:30 PST
- Duration: 30 seconds
- Magnitude: 7.4 M_{s} 6.5 M_{w}
- Epicenter: 14.55°N 120.9°E
- Fault: Manila trench
- Areas affected: Manila Bay
- Max. intensity: PEIS IX (MMI XI)
- Tsunami: Yes
- Landslides: Yes
- Foreshocks: M_{w}4.9 M_{w}4.5
- Aftershocks: 822 (83 felt) including M_{w}5.1 aftershock
- Casualties: 1,000 dead, 200+ injured

The 1863 Manila earthquake struck the Philippines on June 3, 1863.

== Overview ==
The Manila earthquake on June 3, 1863, destroyed Manila Cathedral, the Ayuntamiento (city hall), the Governor's Palace (all three located at the time on Plaza Mayor, now Plaza de Roma) and much of the city. The residence of the governor-general was moved to Malacañang Palace located about 3 km (1.9 miles) up the Pasig River, while the other two buildings were rebuilt in place. The fatality count reached 1,000.

== Epicenter and effects ==
The earthquake was described as disastrous, comparable with the 1645 Luzon earthquake. Laid in ruins the cathedral and nearly all the other churches, except San Agustin, the palace of the Governor-General, the Audiencia, the barracks, warehouses, etc.; all in all, 46 public buildings in ruins and 25 others badly damaged. Of private houses 570 were destroyed, 531 were left tottering. Total, 1,172 buildings were in ruins or badly damaged. The number of victims was appalling, estimated that in Manila and the surrounding towns alone the number of killed reached 400 and the number of injured reached 2,000. The catastrophe likewise involved many towns in the District of Morong and the provinces of Manila, Laguna, and Cavite, where it destroyed churches and a great number of houses.

== See also ==
- List of earthquakes in the Philippines
