= 1645 Luzon earthquake =

Earthquake in the Philippines

1645 Luzon Earthquake
- Location within Philippines
- Local date: November 30, 1645
- Local time: 8:00 PM
- Magnitude: 7.5 M_{s}
- Depth: 13 km (8 mi)
- Epicenter: 16.741428°N 121.750488°E
- Fault: Philippine Fault
- Type: Strike-slip
- Areas affected: Philippines, Central Luzon
- Total damage: Unknown
- Max. intensity: MMI X (Extreme)
- Tsunami: No
- Landslides: Yes
- Casualties: 600 dead – 3,000+ injured

The 1645 Luzon earthquake was one of the most destructive earthquakes to hit the Philippines. It occurred on November 30 at about 8:00 pm local time on Luzon Island in the northern part of the country. The island was struck by a 7.5 M_{s} tremor produced by the San Manuel and Gabaldon Faults (Nueva Ecija) in the central section of the island.

Aftershocks continued a few days, then on December 4 at 11:00 pm, another event (allegedly equal or stronger than November 30) hit the area, causing further death and destruction.

In Manila, damage was entirely severe: it almost "crumbled" ten newly constructed cathedrals in the capital, residential villas and other buildings. An estimated number of 600 Spanish people were killed, and about 3,000 Spanish were injured.

== Epicenter and effects ==
The most terrible earthquake recorded in the annals of the archipelago. It might almost be said that from Manila to Cagayan and Ilocos Norte it left no stone upon the other. In the capital, where during the preceding fifty years a great number of stone buildings had been erected, magnificent churches, palaces, and public buildings, as well as private residences and villas, the destruction was frightful. Ten churches were wrecked entirely, to wit: the Royal Chapel, Cathedral, Santo Domingo, those of the Recollects and Franciscans, Santiago, San Antonio, Nuestra Señora de Guia, and the parish churches of Binondo and San Miguel; only San Agustin and the Jesuit Church remained standing. Twelve monasteries, colleges, and hospitals were likewise converted into ruins. No better fared the palace of the governor-general, the Real Audiencia and up to 150 of the finest residences which, as one author puts it, "in other cities would have been considerable palaces." The rest of the private houses were damaged to so great an extent that the majority had to be demolished. The number of persons killed exceeded 600 and the total of killed and injured is stated to have been 3,000.

Outside of Manila there was a general destruction of villas and other buildings which had been erected on both banks of the Pasig River. Throughout the neighboring provinces the masonry structures built by the missionaries suffered the same fate as those in Manila. From the farthest provinces in the north were reported great alterations of the surface with almost complete disappearance of some native villages, changes in the courses of rivers, subsidences of plains, eruptions of sand, etc. All the writers of the time qualify this disturbance as the most disastrous earthquake not only in Luzon, but likewise in Mindoro, Marinduque, and the other islands south of Luzon. On the other hand, the provinces of Camarines and Albay appear to have suffered little or nothing.

== See also ==
- List of earthquakes in the Philippines
- List of historical earthquakes
