= Central Fire Station =

Central Fire Station or Old Central Fire Station may refer to:

== Denmark ==
- Copenhagen Central Fire Station

== Finland ==
- Tampere Central Fire Station

== Myanmar ==
- Central Fire Station, Yangon

== Singapore ==
- Central Fire Station, Singapore

== United States ==
- Old Little Rock Central Fire Station, in Little Rock, Arkansas
- Old Central Fire Station (North Little Rock, Arkansas)
- Central Fire Station (Honolulu, Hawaii)
- Central Fire Station (Aurora, Illinois)
- Central Fire Station (Davenport, Iowa)
- Central Fire Station (Baton Rouge, Louisiana)
- Ruston Central Fire Station, in Ruston, Louisiana
- Central Fire Station (Shreveport, Louisiana)
- Central Fire Station (Portland, Maine)
- Central Fire Station (Brockton, Massachusetts)
- Central Fire Station (Falmouth, Massachusetts)
- Peabody Central Fire Station, in Peabody, Massachusetts
- Old Central Fire Station (Pittsfield, Massachusetts)
- Central Fire Station (Quincy, Massachusetts)
- Central Fire Station (Taunton, Massachusetts)
- Ann Arbor Central Fire Station, in Ann Arbor, Michigan
- Central Fire Station (Muskegon, Michigan)
- Central Fire Station (Jackson, Mississippi)
- Pascagoula Central Fire Station No. 1, in Pascagoula, Mississippi
- Clovis Central Fire Station, in Clovis, New Mexico
- Central Fire Station (Schenectady, New York)
- Central Fire Station (Greensboro, North Carolina)
- Municipal Building and Central Fire Station, 340, in Scranton, Pennsylvania
- Central Fire Station (Sioux Falls, South Dakota)
- Austin Central Fire Station 1, in Austin, Texas
- Fire Museum of Texas, in Beaumont, Texas
- Central Fire Station (Pampa, Texas)

== See also ==
- List of fire stations
