= National Register of Historic Places listings in Curry County, New Mexico =

Location of Curry County in New Mexico

This is a list of the National Register of Historic Places listings in Curry County, New Mexico.

This is intended to be a complete list of the properties and districts on the National Register of Historic Places in Curry County, New Mexico, United States. Latitude and longitude coordinates are provided for many National Register properties and districts; these locations may be seen together in a map.

There are 12 properties listed on the National Register in the county. All of the places within the county on the National Register are also listed on the State Register of Cultural Properties.

This National Park Service list is complete through NPS recent listings posted March 14, 2025.

Contents: NRHP in New Mexico by county
Bernalillo – Catron – Chaves – Cibola – Colfax – Curry – De Baca – Doña Ana – Eddy – Grant – Guadalupe – Harding – Hidalgo – Lea – Lincoln – Los Alamos – Luna – McKinley – Mora – Otero – Quay – Rio Arriba – Roosevelt – San Juan – San Miguel – Sandoval – Santa Fe – Sierra – Socorro – Taos – Torrance – Union – Valencia

== Current listings ==
	Name on the Register	Image	Date listed	Location	City or town	Description
1	1908 Clovis City Hall and Fire Station	1908 Clovis City Hall and Fire Station	July 16, 1987 (#87001110)	308 Pile St. 34°24′04″N 103°12′02″W	Clovis	
2	Clovis Baptist Hospital	Clovis Baptist Hospital	February 5, 1982 (#82003322)	515 Prince St. 34°24′12″N 103°11′44″W	Clovis	
3	Clovis Central Fire Station	Clovis Central Fire Station	July 2, 1987 (#87001111)	320 Mitchell St. 34°24′05″N 103°12′23″W	Clovis	
4	Curry County Courthouse	Curry County Courthouse	June 18, 1987 (#87000881)	700 block of Main St. 34°24′19″N 103°12′19″W	Clovis	
5	First Methodist Church of Clovis	First Methodist Church of Clovis	July 2, 1987 (#87001112)	622 Main St. 34°24′15″N 103°12′19″W	Clovis	
6	Hillcrest Park Archway	Hillcrest Park Archway	July 2, 2008 (#08000573)	Intersection of East 10th and Sycamore St., approximately 2,757 feet (840 m) east of intersection of 10th and Prince Sts. 34°24′29″N 103°11′15″W	Clovis	part of the New Deal in New Mexico Multiple Property Submission
7	Lincoln Jackson School		October 4, 2017 (#100001716)	206 Alphon St. 34°24′00″N 103°13′31″W	Clovis	
8	Hotel Clovis	Hotel Clovis	December 27, 1984 (#84000571)	210 Main St. 34°24′00″N 103°12′53″W	Clovis	
9	Lyceum Theater	Lyceum Theater	January 17, 2007 (#06001253)	409 Main St. 34°24′14″N 103°12′19″W	Clovis	
10	Old Clovis Post Office	Old Clovis Post Office	December 27, 1984 (#84000573)	122 W. 4th St. 34°24′07″N 103°12′23″W	Clovis	
11	Santa Fe Passenger Depot-Clovis	Santa Fe Passenger Depot-Clovis	December 14, 1995 (#95001451)	221 W. 1st St. 34°23′52″N 103°12′26″W	Clovis	
12	State Theater	State Theater	January 17, 2007 (#06001255)	504 Main St. 34°24′18″N 103°12′20″W	Clovis	

== See also ==
- List of National Historic Landmarks in New Mexico
- National Register of Historic Places listings in New Mexico
