= Roosevelt County Courthouse =

- U.S. National Register of Historic Places
- NM State Register of Cultural Properties
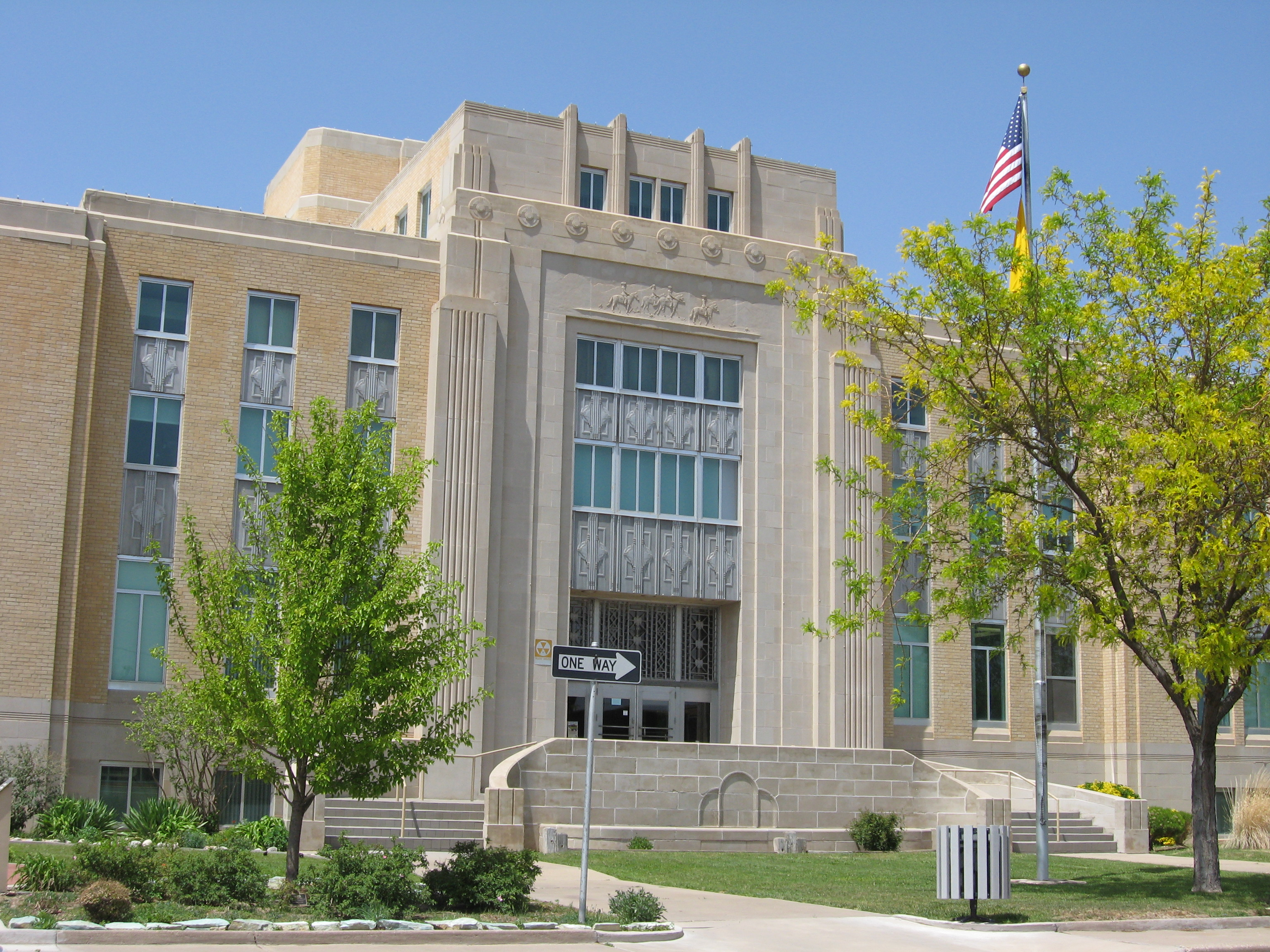
- Roosevelt County Courthouse in 2008

- Location within New Mexico
- Location: 100 W. 2nd St., Portales, New Mexico
- Coordinates: 34°11′9″N 103°20′12″W
- Area: 3 acres (1.2 ha)
- Built: 1938
- Architect: Robert E. Merrell
- Architectural style: Art Deco
- MPS: New Deal in New Mexico MPS
- NRHP reference No.: 08001136
- NMSRCP No.: 1278

Significant dates
- Added to NRHP: December 3, 2008
- Designated NMSRCP: May 9, 1986

The Roosevelt County Courthouse built in 1938 is an historic Art Deco courthouse located at 100 West 2nd Street in Portales, New Mexico. It was designed by architect Robert E. Merrell of Clovis (designer of the Curry County Courthouse and the Hotel Clovis in Clovis, New Mexico) and built of poured Portland cement.

On December 3, 2008, it was added to the National Register of Historic Places.

== See also ==
- National Register of Historic Places listings in Roosevelt County, New Mexico
