= Curry County Courthouse =

- U.S. National Register of Historic Places
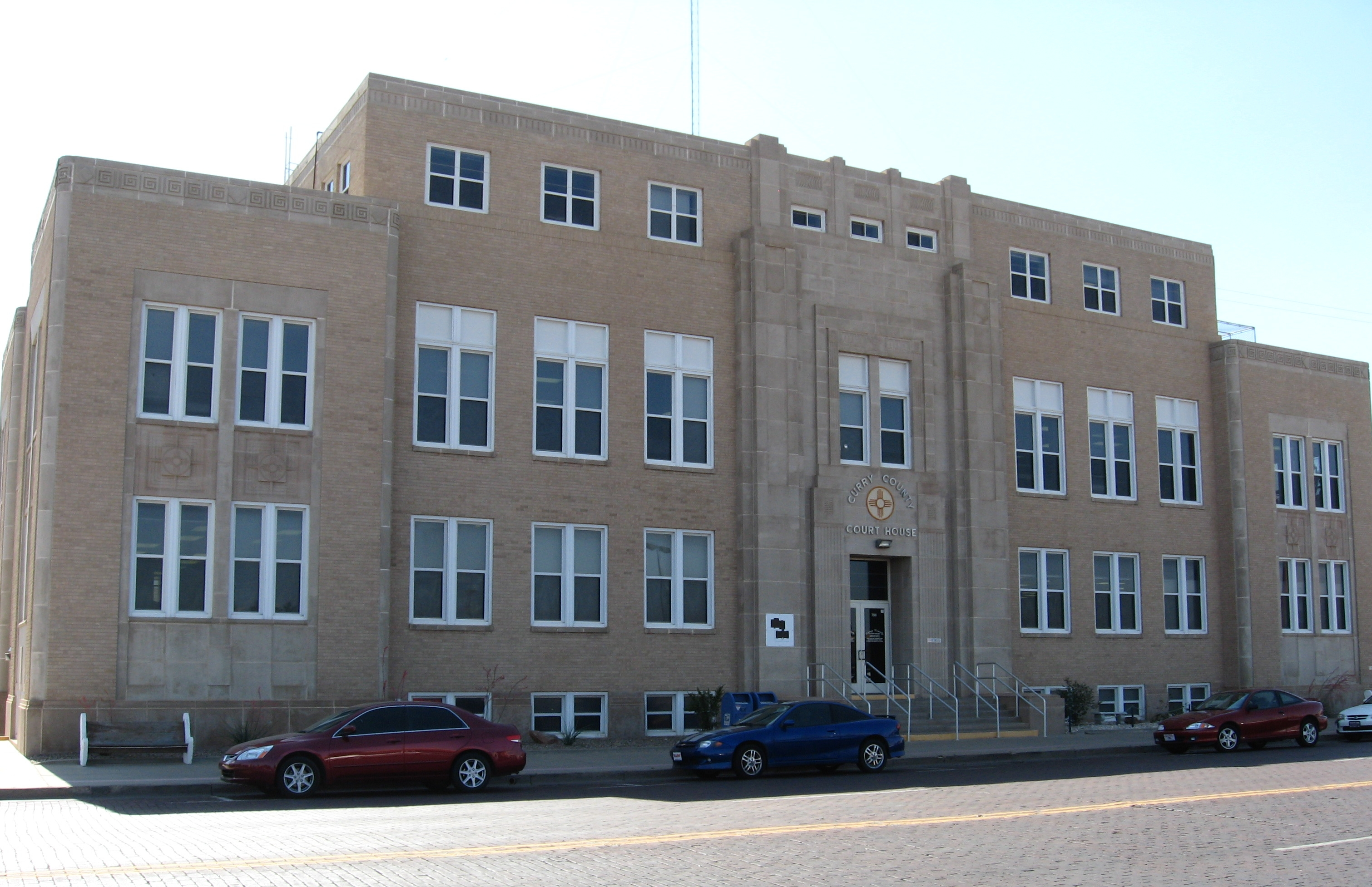

- Location within New Mexico Location within the United States
- Location: 700 block of Main St., Clovis, New Mexico
- Coordinates: 34°24′19″N 103°12′19″W
- Area: 2.5 acres (1.0 ha)
- Built: 1936, 1954
- Architect: Schaefer & Merrell
- Architectural style: Art Deco
- MPS: County Courthouses of New Mexico TR
- NRHP reference No.: 87000881
- Added to NRHP: June 18, 1987

The Curry County Courthouse in Clovis, New Mexico is a three-and-a-half-story Art Deco-style courthouse which was built in 1936. It was listed on the National Register of Historic Places in 1987.

It was designed by architect Robert E. Merrell of Schaefer & Merrell architectural firm. It was expanded in 1954 with a two-story addition, also designed by Robert E. Merrell, over the site of the preceding 1910 courthouse.

Merrell also designed the NRHP-listed Hotel Clovis, at 210 Main St. in Clovis, and the NRHP-listed Roosevelt County Courthouse at 100 W. 2nd St. in Portales, New Mexico.
