= Old Clovis Post Office =

- U.S. National Register of Historic Places
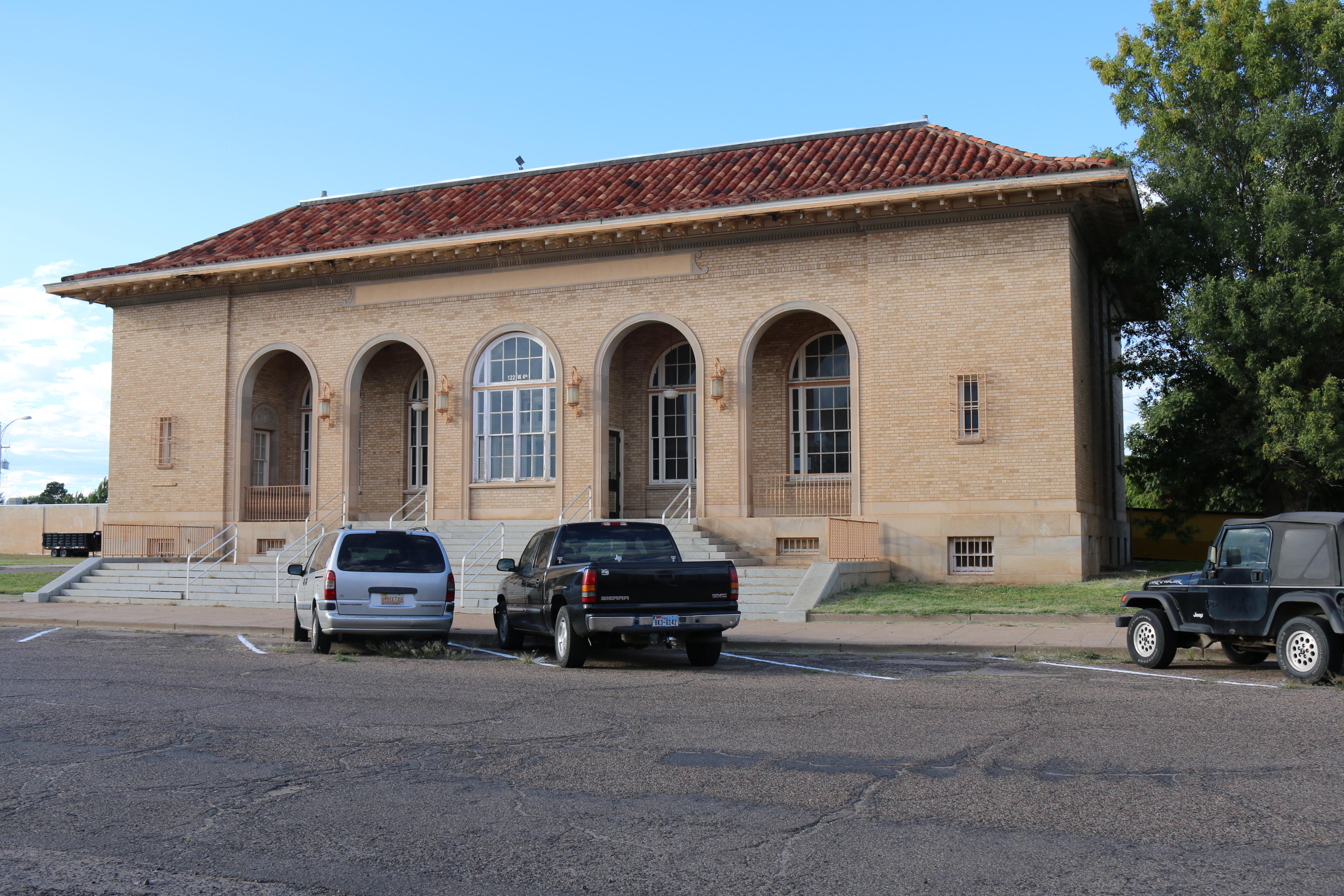

- Location within New Mexico Location within the United States
- Location: 4th and Mitchell Sts., Clovis, New Mexico
- Coordinates: 34°24′10″N 103°12′59″W
- Area: less than one acre
- Built: 1931
- Architect: Louis Simon, J.A. Wetmore
- Architectural style: Classical Revival, Mission/spanish Revival
- NRHP reference No.: 84000573
- Added to NRHP: December 27, 1984

The Old Clovis Post Office at 4th and Mitchell Sts. in Clovis, New Mexico is a former post office built in 1931. It includes elements of Classical Revival and Mission/Spanish Revival architecture. It has also served as the Clovis-Carver Public Library.

It is a two-story building with a hipped and flat roof, built on an ashlar sandstone basement. It has various tan shades of brick in its walls and its roof is light-brown and orange tile.

The building is significant as a public works project during the Great Depression.

It was built in the same year as the Hotel Clovis, which is also NRHP-listed.
