= State Theater (Clovis, New Mexico) =

- U.S. National Register of Historic Places
- NM State Register of Cultural Properties
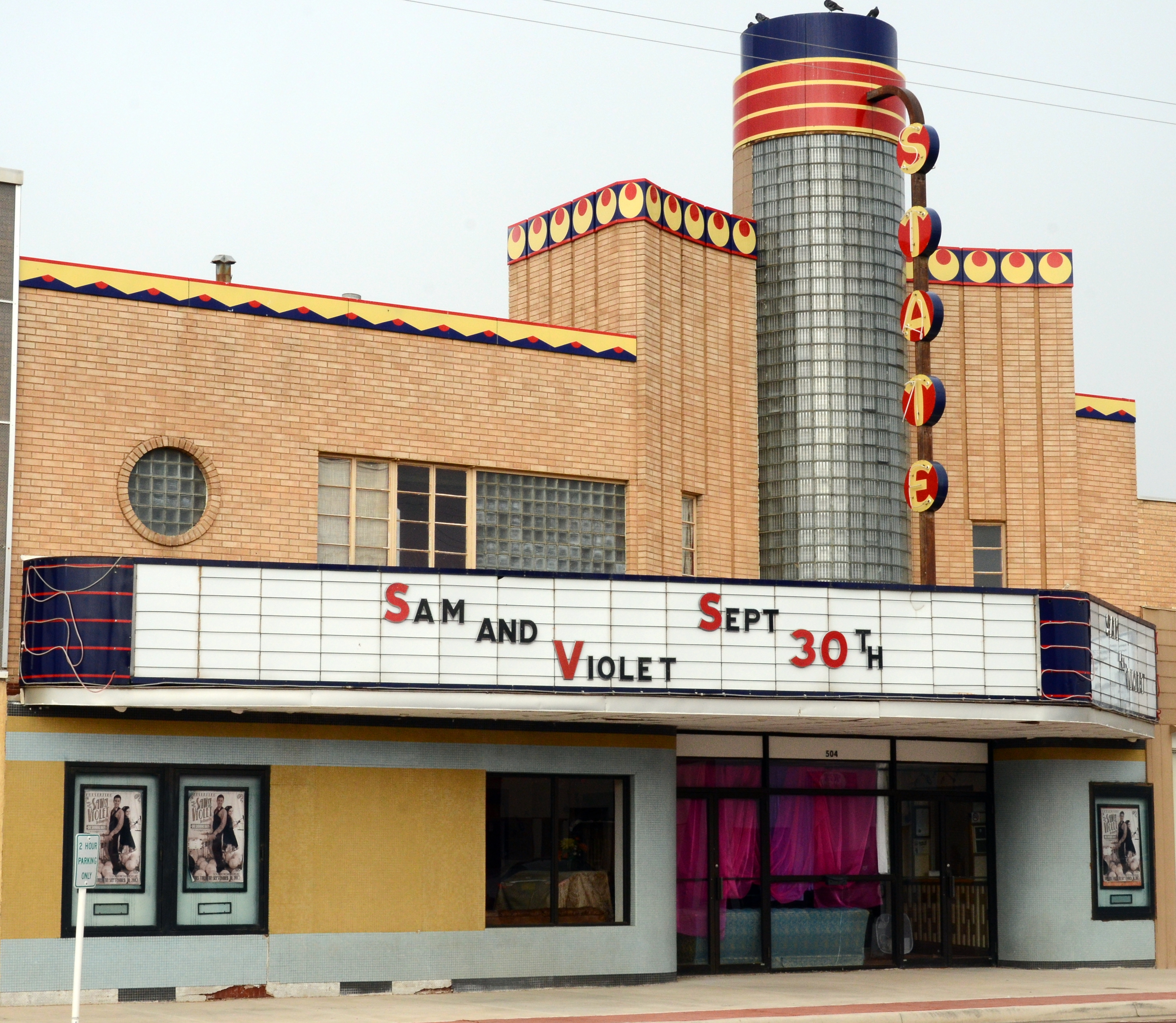
- State Theater, Clovis, New Mexico

- Location within New Mexico
- Location: 504 Main St., Clovis, New Mexico
- Coordinates: 34°24′18″N 103°12′20″W
- Area: less than one acre
- Built: 1940
- Architectural style: Moderne
- MPS: Movie Theaters in New Mexico MPS
- NRHP reference No.: 06001255
- NMSRCP No.: 1899

Significant dates
- Added to NRHP: January 17, 2007
- Designated NMSRCP: August 11, 2006

The State Theater is an art deco-style theater in Clovis, New Mexico, which opened in 1936. It is still in use, although today it presents live musical acts rather than movies. It is one of three historic movie theaters in Clovis. The centerpiece of the marquee is a tall, vertical, cylindrical glass brick column.

In 2007 the theater, at 504 Main Street, was added to both the State and National Register of Historic Places listings in New Mexico (SR#1899, NRHP # 355920). It is one of two historic movie theaters in Clovis that are on the NRHP, the other being the Lyceum Theater at 409 Main Street. The nomination of the theater as part of the Clovis Railroad and Commercial Historic District includes the description of the State Theater by historian David Kammer as “the most richly detailed example of a modernistic style theater façade in New Mexico.”

== See also ==
- National Register of Historic Places listings in Curry County, New Mexico
