= Lincoln Jackson School =

- U.S. National Register of Historic Places
- Location within New Mexico Location within the United States
- Location: 206 Alphon St., Clovis, New Mexico
- Coordinates: 34°24′00″N 103°13′31″W
- Area: 1.78 acres (0.72 ha)
- NRHP reference No.: 100001716
- Added to NRHP: October 4, 2017

The Lincoln Jackson School, at 206 Alphon St. in Clovis, New Mexico, was listed on the National Register of Historic Places in 2017.

It is a one-story L-shaped complex of International Style buildings built during 1952 to 1965. The buildings replaced the prior buildings which had served African-American students only, during Clovis County's racial segregation of education, which did not end until 1954. The complex served as an elementary school for predominantly African American students from 1954 to 1965. The school was known originally as the Colored School.
