= Clovis Central Fire Station =

- U.S. National Register of Historic Places
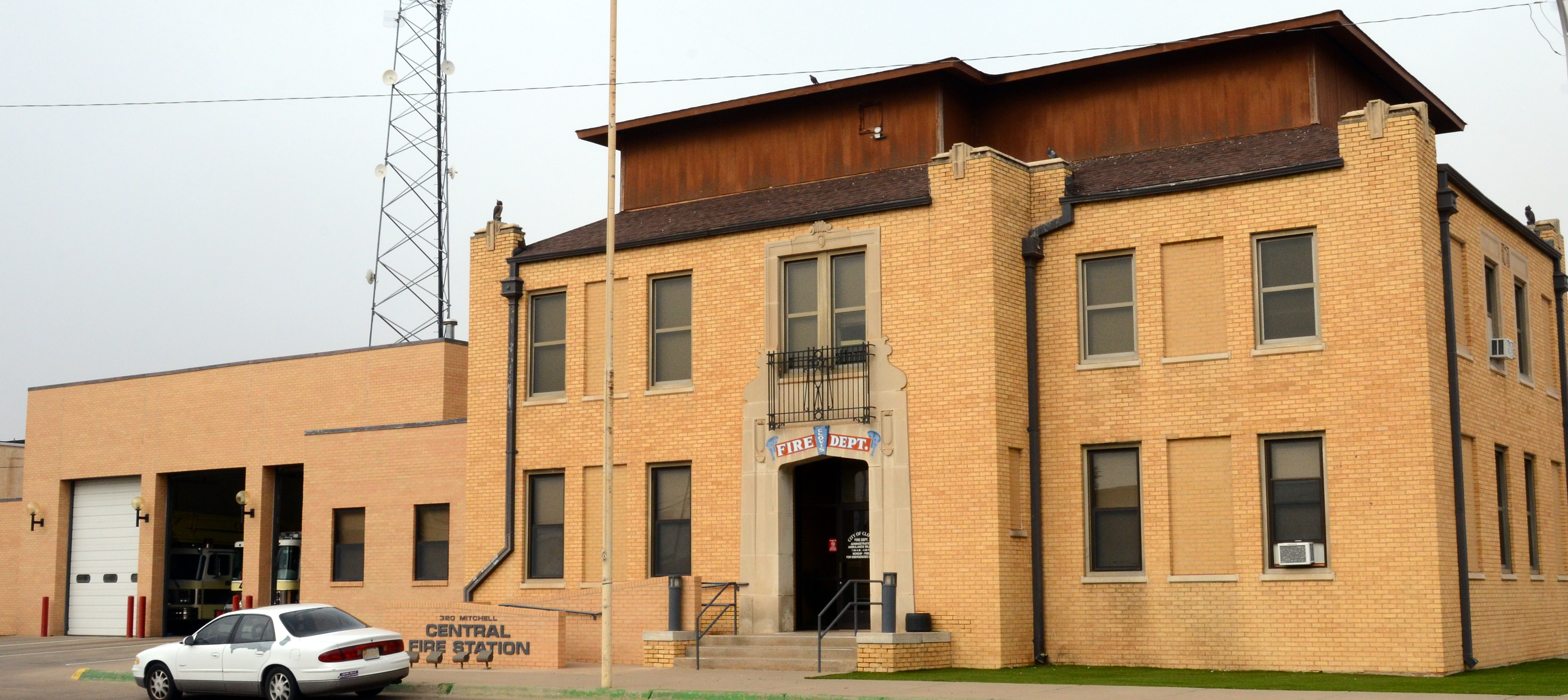

- Location within New Mexico Location within the United States
- Location: 320 Mitchell St., Clovis, New Mexico
- Coordinates: 34°24′5″N 103°12′23″W
- Area: less than one acre
- Built: 1929
- Built by: Wallace Const.
- Architect: Lightfoot & Funk
- Architectural style: Early Commercial
- NRHP reference No.: 87001111
- Added to NRHP: July 2, 1987

The Clovis Central Fire Station at 320 Mitchell St. in Clovis, Curry County, New Mexico is an Early Commercial-style building that was built in 1929 and reflected confidence in the city's prospects at the beginning of the Great Depression. It was listed on the National Register of Historic Places in 1987.

It has also been known as the Clovis City Hall and Fire Station. In these functions it replaced the 1908 Clovis City Hall and Fire Station (which is also listed on the National Register). It is on the same block as the City Hall and Municipal Court building.

It is a two-story building with a truncated hipped roof and is partially flat-roofed. Its walls include blonde brick laid in running bond and light gray/tan concrete details.
