= Peabody Central Fire Station =

- U.S. National Register of Historic Places
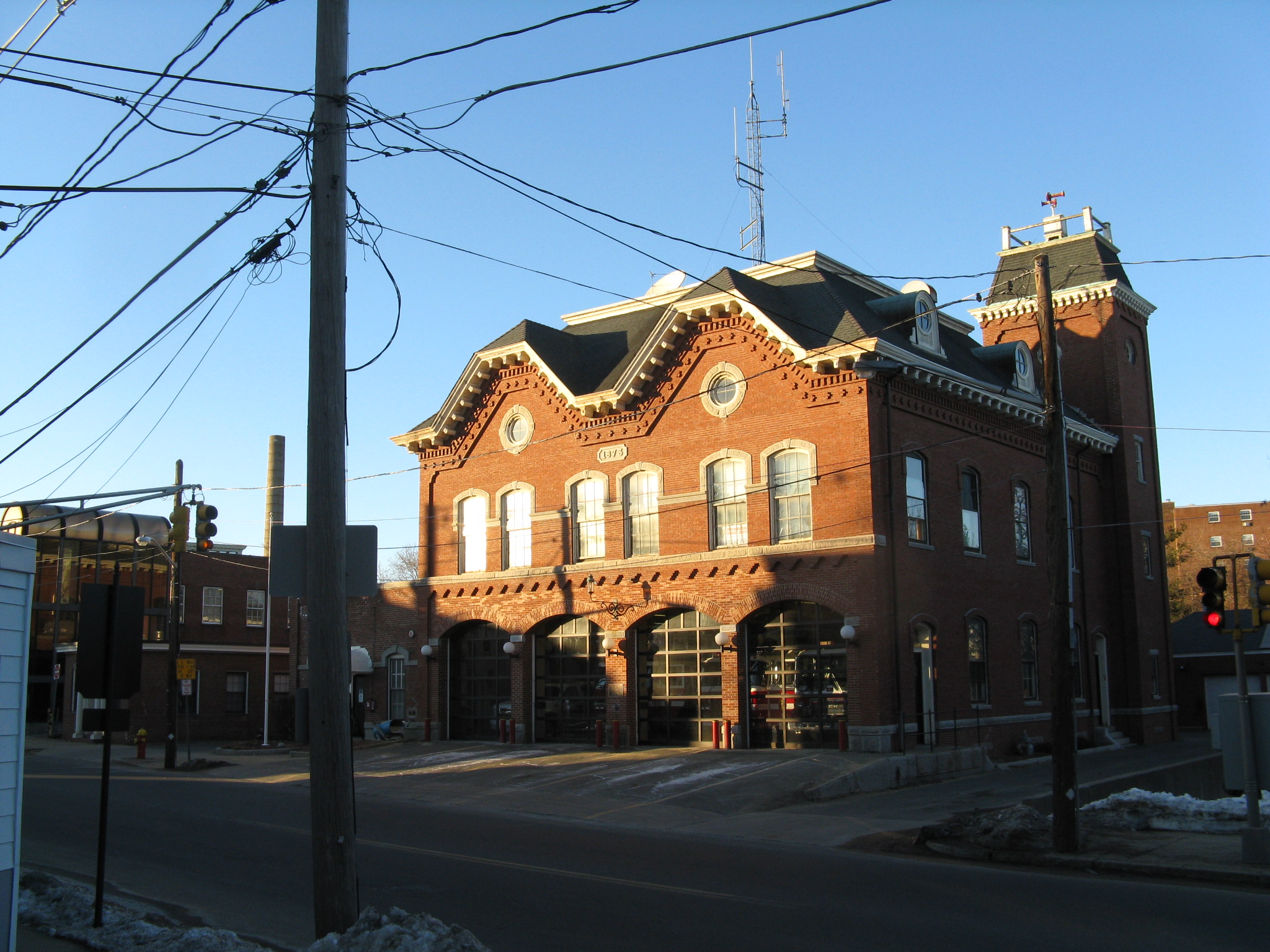
- Peabody Central Fire Station

- Location within Massachusetts Location within the United States
- Location: Peabody, Massachusetts
- Coordinates: 42°31′38″N 70°55′52″W
- Built: 1873
- Architect: Bruce & Copeland
- NRHP reference No.: 79000344
- Added to NRHP: April 11, 1979

The Peabody Central Fire Station is a historic fire station at 41 Lowell Street in Peabody, Massachusetts, United States. Built in 1873, the two story brick building is one of the oldest active fire stations in the state. The building has Victorian styling, with a mansard roof, and two truncated gables on its front facade. The cornice is studded with regularly spaced brackets, and a tower rises from the building's rear right corner.

The building was listed on the National Register of Historic Places in 1979.

== See also ==
- National Register of Historic Places listings in Essex County, Massachusetts
