= Old Little Rock Central Fire Station =

- Little Rock Central Fire Station
- U.S. National Register of Historic Places
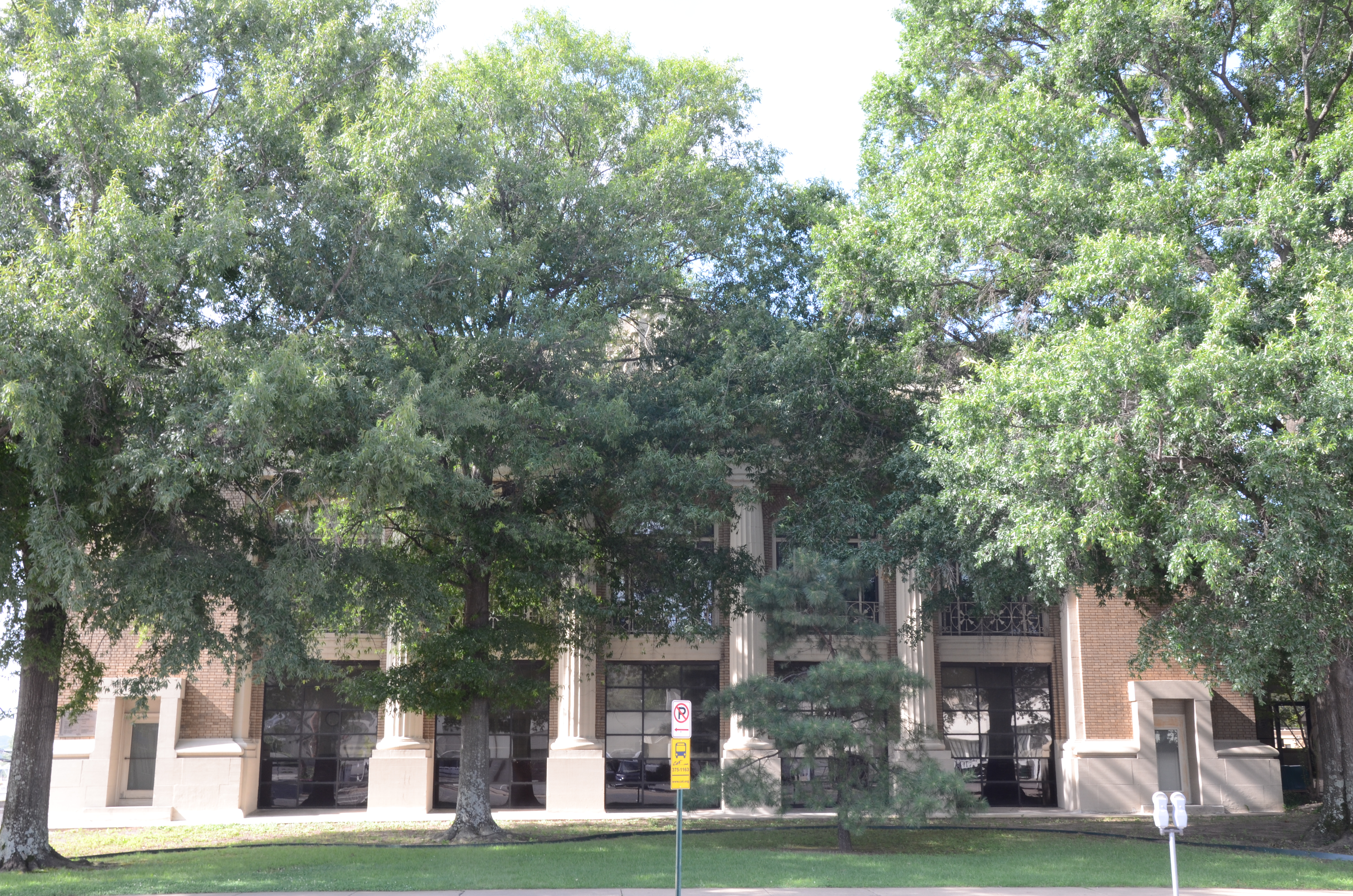

- Location within Arkansas Location within the United States
- Location: 520 W. Markham St., Little Rock, Arkansas
- Coordinates: 34°44′57″N 92°16′32″W
- Area: less than one acre
- Built: 1913
- Architect: Charles L. Thompson, Tom Harding
- Architectural style: Beaux Arts
- NRHP reference No.: 79000451
- Added to NRHP: October 18, 1979

The Old Little Rock Central Fire Station is a historic firehouse, next to Little Rock City Hall at 520 West Markham Street in downtown Little Rock, Arkansas. It is, from its front, a Beaux Arts two-story masonry building, designed by Charles L. Thompson and built in 1913. The front facade is dominated by the former equipment bays, which are separated by fluted columns, and topped by an elaborate architrave. The building is now used for other purposes by the city.

The building was listed on the National Register of Historic Places in 1979.

== See also ==
- National Register of Historic Places listings in Little Rock, Arkansas
