= 1908 Clovis City Hall and Fire Station =

- U.S. National Register of Historic Places
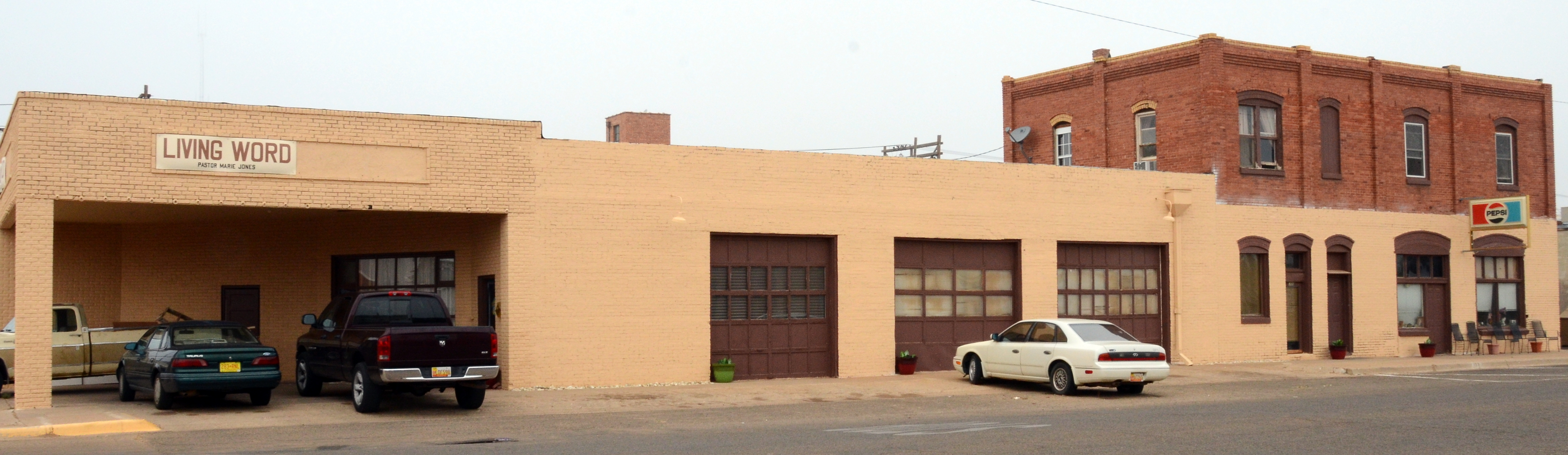
- The historic building is only the two-story portion at right, in this 2012 photo.

- Location within New Mexico Location within the United States
- Location: 308 Pile St., Clovis, New Mexico
- Coordinates: 34°24′4″N 103°12′2″W
- Area: less than one acre
- Built: 1908
- Architectural style: Early Commercial
- NRHP reference No.: 87001110
- Added to NRHP: July 16, 1987

The 1908 Clovis City Hall and Fire Station at 308 Pile St. in Clovis in Curry County, New Mexico was the first city hall and fire station in the city; it served in that role from 1908 until 1929, and later served as an auto repair shop then as a hotel. It was listed on the National Register of Historic Places in 1987.

It is a two-story Early Commercial-style brick building.
