= Pascagoula Central Fire Station No. 1 =

- U.S. National Register of Historic Places
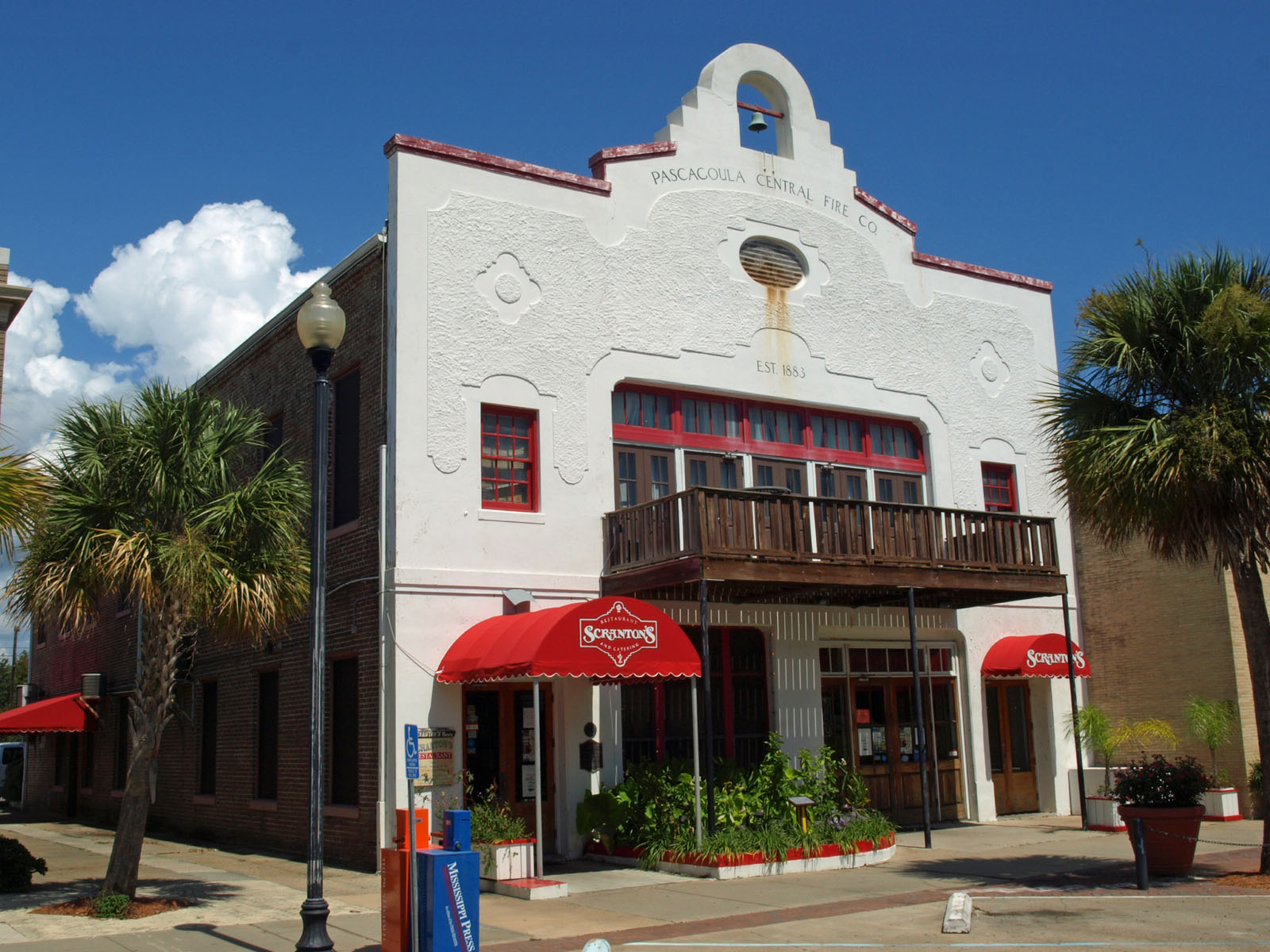

- Location within Mississippi Location within the United States
- Location: 623 Delmas Ave., Pascagoula, Mississippi
- Coordinates: 30°22′01″N 88°33′30″W
- Area: less than one acre
- Built: 1924
- Architect: Owen, Charles
- Architectural style: Mission/Spanish Revival
- NRHP reference No.: 78001604
- Added to NRHP: December 8, 1978

The Pascagoula Central Fire Station No. 1, at 623 Delmas Ave. in Pascagoula, Mississippi, was built in 1924. It was listed on the National Register of Historic Places in 1978. It has also been known as the "Old Fire Station".

It was designed in 1919 by Mobile architect Charles Owen but was not built for several years.

Since 1982 Scranton's Restaurant has occupied the building.
