= Central Fire Station (Quincy, Massachusetts) =

- U.S. National Register of Historic Places
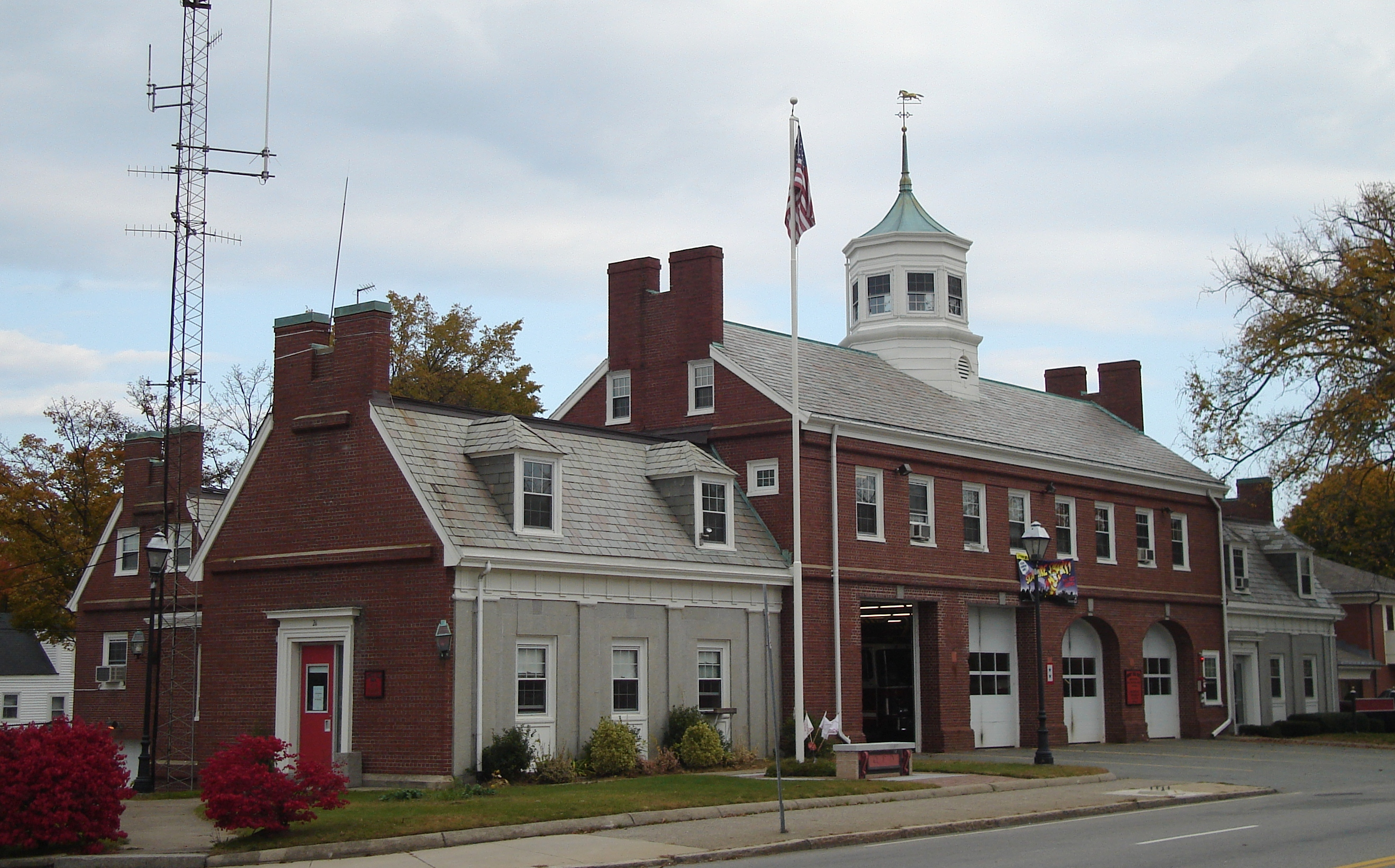

- Location within Massachusetts Location within the United States
- Location: 40 Quincy Ave., Quincy, Massachusetts
- Coordinates: 42°14′40″N 70°59′57″W
- Built: 1938
- Architect: Robinson, George E.
- Architectural style: Colonial Revival
- MPS: Quincy MRA
- NRHP reference No.: 89001371
- Added to NRHP: September 20, 1989

The Central Fire Station is a historic fire station at 26 Quincy Avenue in Quincy, Massachusetts. The 2 1/2-story brick Colonial Revival structure was built in 1938 to a design by local architect George Robinson (who also designed a number of Quincy's other period firehouses). The building is evocative of (if less ornate than) Philadelphia's Independence Hall, with paired side chimneys on its main block and on its three wings, and its cupola.

The building was listed on the National Register of Historic Places in 1989.

== See also ==
- National Register of Historic Places listings in Quincy, Massachusetts
