= Central Fire Station (Schenectady, New York) =

- U.S. National Register of Historic Places
- Location within New York Location within the United States
- Location: Erie Blvd., Schenectady, New York
- Coordinates: 42°48′48″N 73°56′47″W
- Area: less than one acre
- Built: 1929
- Architectural style: Colonial Revival, Georgian Revival
- NRHP reference No.: 85000729
- Added to NRHP: April 11, 1985

Central Fire Station is a historic fire station located at Schenectady in Schenectady County, New York, USA. It was built between 1924 and 1929 and is a three-story, brick civic building in the Georgian Revival style. The front facade is dominated by a broad, five bay central pavilion. The first floor of the front facade is composed of five segmentally arched entrance bays faced with cast stone. The Schenectady Fire Department ceased using the building in 1981.

It was added to the National Register of Historic Places in 1985.
