= Central Fire Station (Baton Rouge, Louisiana) =

- U.S. National Register of Historic Places
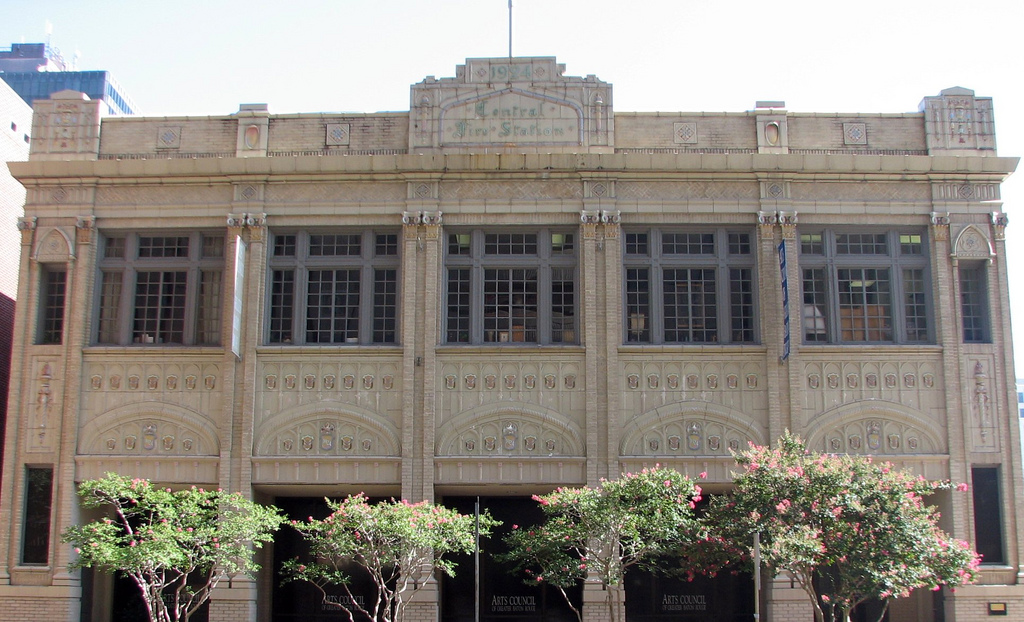

- Location within Louisiana Location within the United States
- Location: 427 Laurel St., Baton Rouge, Louisiana
- Coordinates: 30°27′03″N 91°11′11″W
- Area: 0.3 acres (0.12 ha)
- Built: 1924
- Architect: William T. Nolan
- Architectural style: Gothic Revival
- NRHP reference No.: 84001277
- Added to NRHP: April 5, 1984

The Central Fire Station in Baton Rouge, Louisiana, at 427 Laurel St., was built in 1924. It is listed on the National Register of Historic Places since 1984. It has also been known as Bogan Fire Station and it is home to the Robert A. Bogan Firefighters Museum.

It is a two-story brick and terra cotta building with a Gothic Revival facade.

It was designed by architect William T. Nolan and was built by the City of Baton Rouge.
