= Central Fire Station (Muskegon, Michigan) =

- U.S. National Register of Historic Places
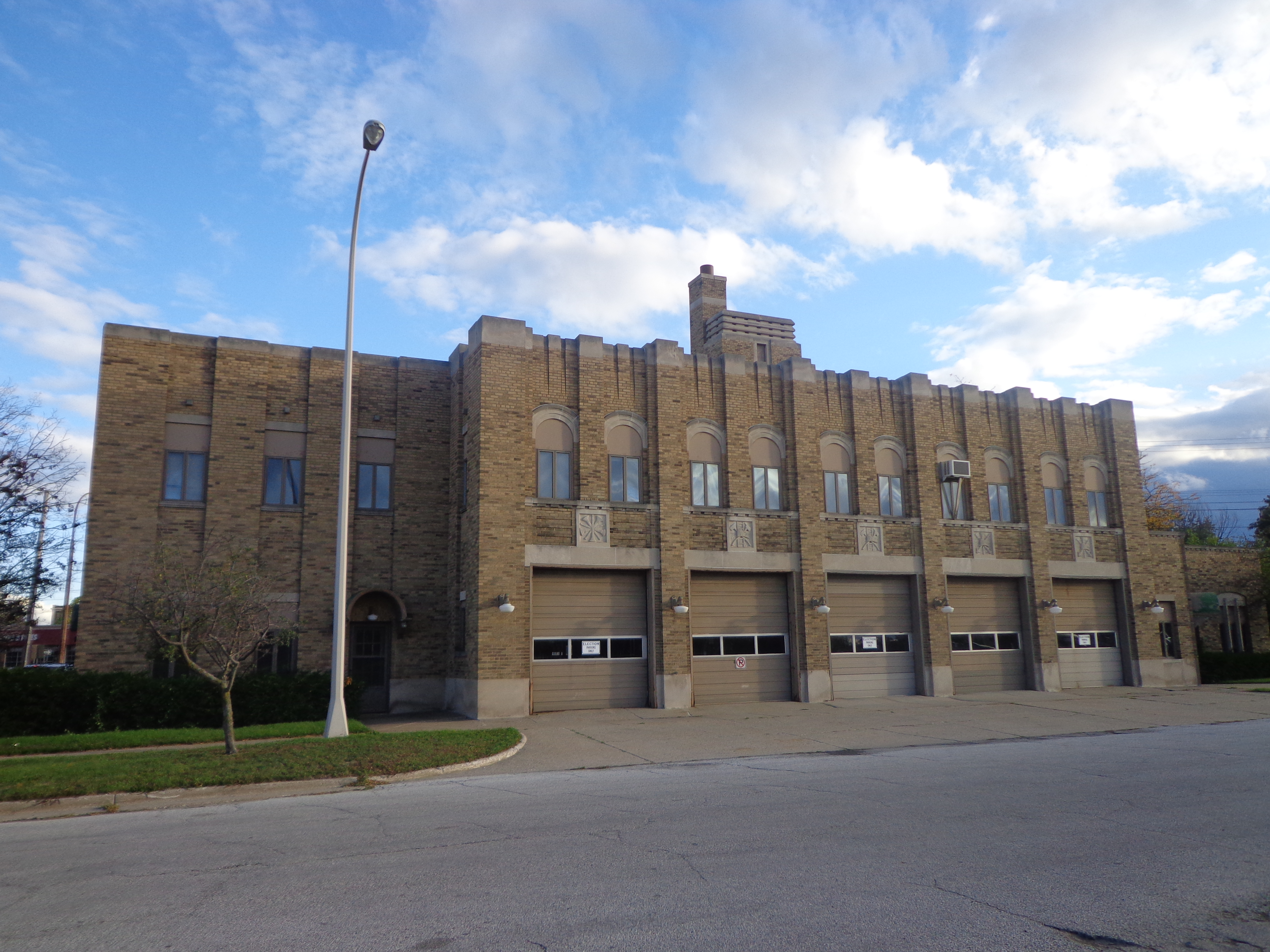

- Location within Michigan Location within the United States
- Interactive map
- Location: 75 W. Walton Ave., Muskegon, Michigan
- Coordinates: 43°14′4″N 86°14′44″W
- Area: less than one acre
- Built: 1930
- Architect: Leo J. Heenan, VanderWest and Child
- Architectural style: Art Deco
- NRHP reference No.: 99000341
- Added to NRHP: March 18, 1999

The Muskegon Central Fire Station is a building originally constructed to house a fire station, located at 75 W. Walton Avenue in Muskegon, Michigan. It was added to the National Register of Historic Places in 1999. The building has been renovated into office space, and is known as the Firehouse Professional Building.

== History ==
Before the construction of this building, Muskegon's main fire station was located in the City Hall on Jefferson Street for nearly 50 years. In 1929, Muskegon commissioned architect Leo J. Heenan of Pontiac, Michigan to design this building, with the assistance of the local firm of VanderWest and Child. The station was constructed in 1929-30, and opened on October 9, 1930.

The fire station was in use from when it opened until 2007, when the city constructed a replacement building. The city sold the building in 2012 to a developer, who renovated the building into office space.

== Description ==
The Muskegon Central Fire Station is a two-story Art Deco building containing 28,000 square feet of space. It is constructed of blonde colored brick and Indiana limestone, and features five large entrance bays, each 11 feet wide, intended for fire trucks. The bays are separated by brick piers with limestone capitals. Decorative limestone panels are located above each entrance, depicting various fire-fighting symbols. The building has a flat roof, penetrated by a hose tower and chimney.

On the interior, the walls are finished with enameled brick and the floors with terrazzo. Oak wainscoting is located in some rooms and hallways. When it opened as a fire station, the building was touted as an innovative advance in fire-fighting, with an emphasis on easy access in the interior and flow-through mobility.
