= Central Fire Station, Yangon =

- ရန်ကုန်တိုင်းဒေသကြီး မီးသတ်စခန်း
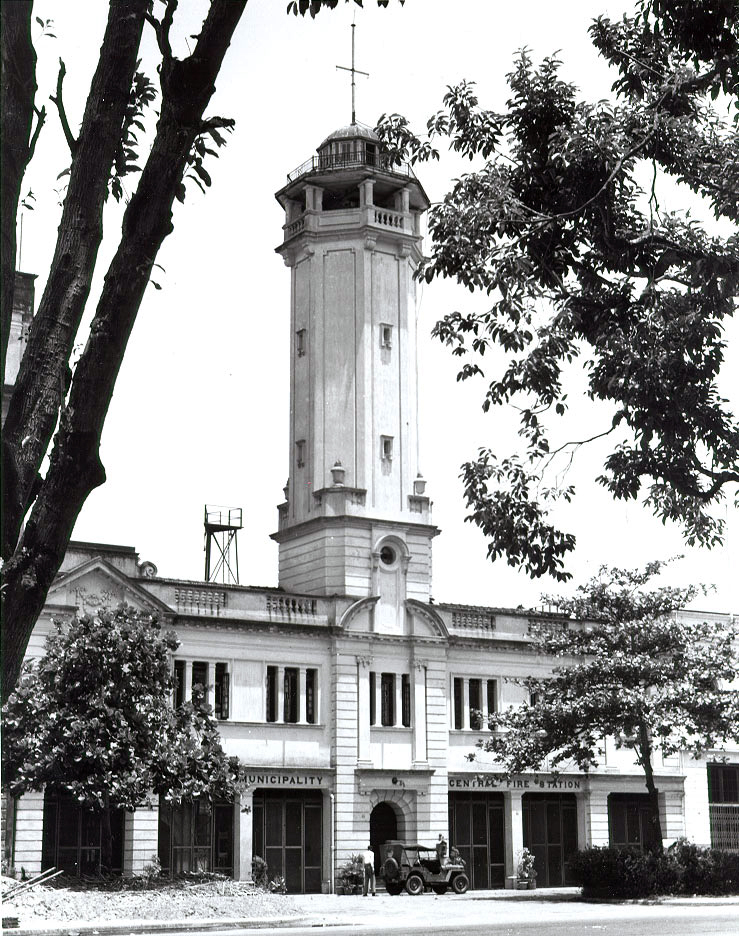
- Interactive map of the Central Fire Station, Yangon area

General information
- Architectural style: Edwardian
- Location: Yangon, Myanmar
- Coordinates: 16.776102°N 96.158425°E
- Completed: 1912

Design and construction
- Architect: United Engineers Ltd.

Central Fire Station, Yangon (Burmese: ရန်ကုန်တိုင်းဒေသကြီး မီးသတ်စခန်း) is a colonial-era landmark in Yangon, Myanmar of historical significance, and designated on the Yangon City Heritage List. The building continues to be used as a fire station.

The building was built in 1912, designed by the British firm United Engineers Limited. It was built to house Rangoon's fire brigade, which had been established by the Rangoon Municipal Committee in 1883. The municipality acquired a plot of land on Sule Pagoda Road at a cost of 40,000 rupees. The building, built in the Edwardian style, is noted for its 100 ft (30 metres) octagonal watchtower, and was one of the first iron-frame buildings in Yangon.
