= Hotel Clovis =

Historic building in Clovis, New Mexico, US

- U.S. National Register of Historic Places
- NM State Register of Cultural Properties
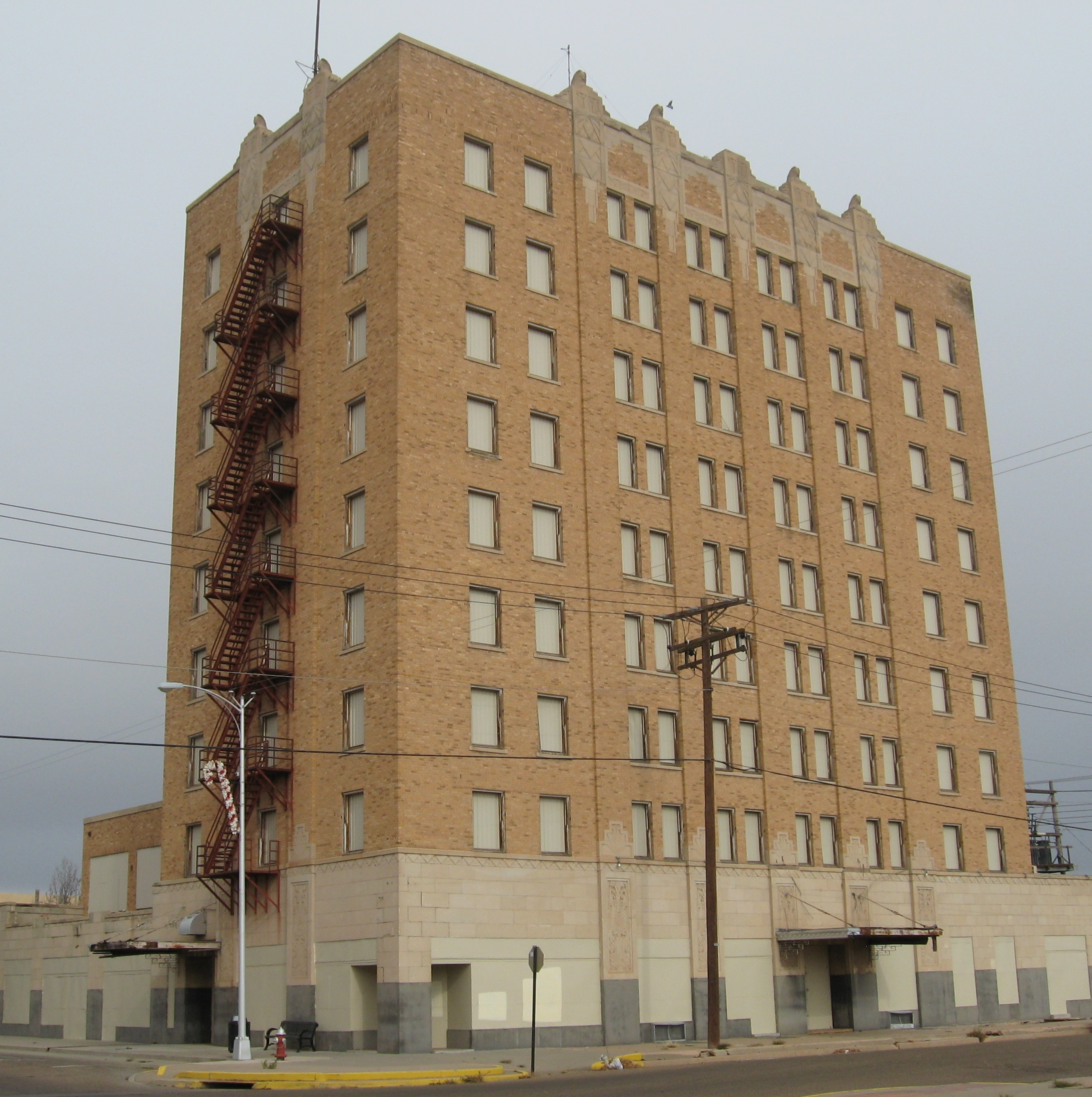

- Location within New Mexico
- Location: 201 N Main Street, Clovis, New Mexico
- Coordinates: 34°24′0″N 103°12′53″W
- Area: less than one acre
- Built: 1931
- Architect: Robert Merrell, H. W. Underhill
- Architectural style: Art Deco, Modernistic
- NRHP reference No.: 84000571
- NMSRCP No.: 1109

Significant dates
- Added to NRHP: December 27, 1984
- Designated NMSRCP: October 17, 1984

The Hotel Clovis is a ten-story former hotel in Clovis, New Mexico, United States. Designed by architect Robert Merrell, the Art Deco structure was opened as a hotel on October 20, 1931. Hotel Clovis was added to the National Register of Historic Places in 1984.

Although the hotel closed in 1983, Developer Stephen Crozier launched an extensive renovation, announcing that he would build 31 loft-style apartments in the Art Deco building, as well as creating some 8,000 square feet of commercial space. The developer also wanted to build two separate structures that will house an additional 59 units. Groundbreaking started September 30, 2011 and the construction project became the Hotel Clovis Lofts. Hotel Clovis Lofts is now (as of January 2020) occupied.

Though first touted as "upper-income assisted living" the apartments are HUD assisted and lower income housing. As of mid-2017, the street-level commercial spaces remain unoccupied and have not been architecturally finished. Developer Steven Crozier has continued building additional apartments two blocks west of the Hotel Clovis encompassing a full city block.

== See also ==
- National Register of Historic Places listings in Curry County, New Mexico
