= Clovis, New Mexico =

City in the United States

- City
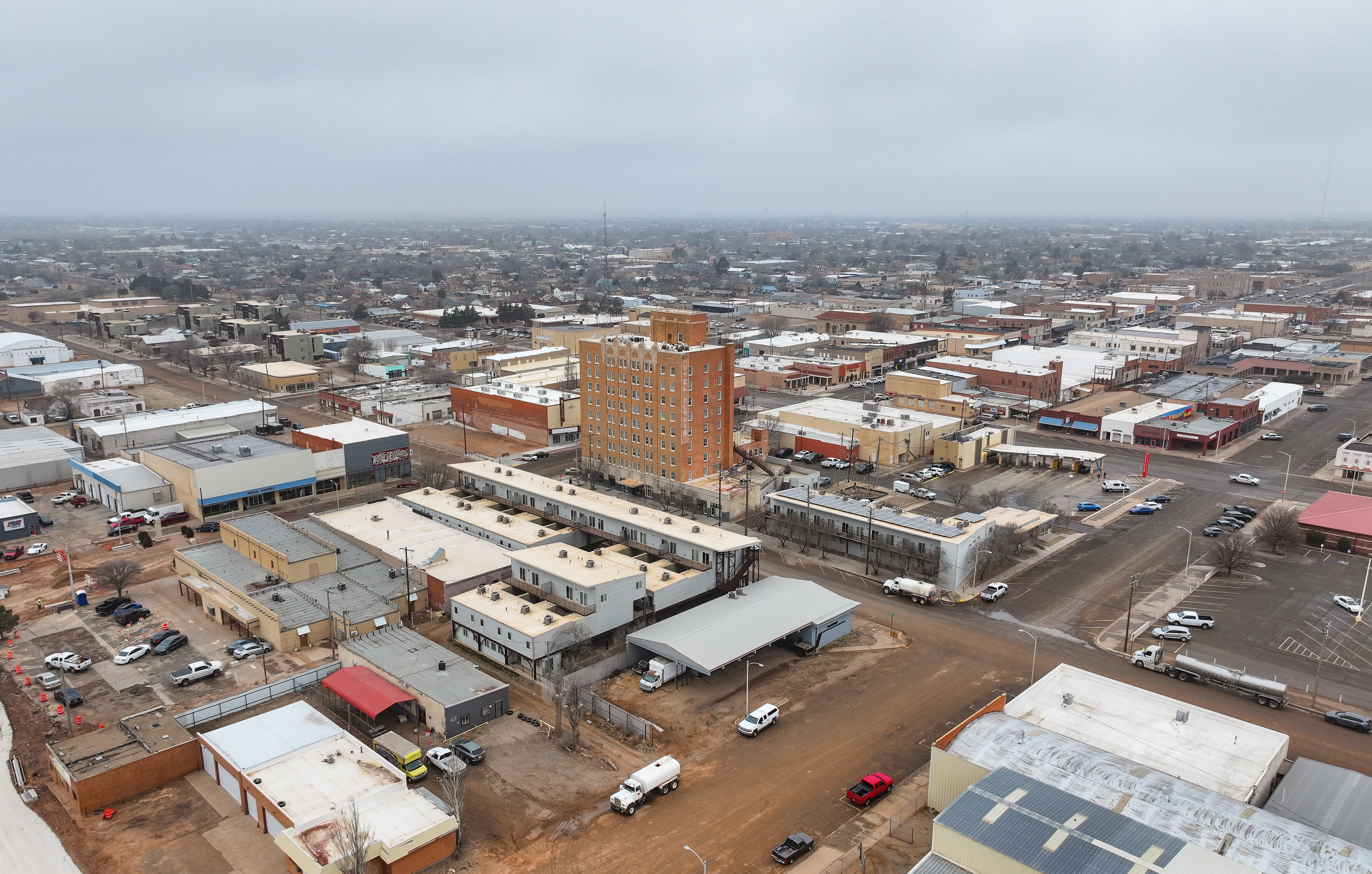
- Downtown Clovis in 2025

- Seal
- Motto: "A City On The Move – Come Grow With Us!"
- Location of Clovis, New Mexico

- Location in the United States
- Coordinates: 34°24′17″N 103°12′19″W
- Country: United States
- State: New Mexico
- County: Curry
- Founded: 1906
- Incorporated: 1909

Government
  - Mayor: Mike Morris
  - City manager: Justin Howalt

Area
  - City: 23.792 sq mi (61.621 km^{2})
  - Land: 23.624 sq mi (61.187 km^{2})
  - Water: 0.167 sq mi (0.433 km^{2}) 0.73%
- Elevation: 4,268 ft (1,301 m)

Population (2020)
  - City: 38,567
  - Estimate (2023): 37,612
  - Density: 1,592/sq mi (614.7/km^{2})
  - Urban: 39,314
  - Metro: 65,869 (US: 135th)
- Time zone: UTC−7 (Mountain (MST))
  - Summer (DST): UTC−6 (MDT)
- ZIP Codes: 88101, 88102, 88103
- Area code: 575
- FIPS code: 35-16420
- GNIS feature ID: 0915815
- Sales tax: 7.94%
- Website: www.clovisnm.gov

Clovis is a city in and the county seat of Curry County, New Mexico. The population was 38,567 at the 2020 census. Clovis is located in the New Mexico portion of the Llano Estacado, in the eastern part of the state.

A largely agricultural community, close to the border with Texas, it is noted for its role in early rock music history and for nearby Cannon Air Force Base, current home to the 27th Special Operations Wing which is also known as "The Steadfast Line". A Paleo-Indian site was found near Clovis, where in 1929 a distinctive kind of stone spear-point was discovered. These points were called Clovis points, and the culture associated with them was named the Clovis culture. The Clovis people were early inhabitants who created a widespread culture in the New World. The Atchison, Topeka and Santa Fe Railway system helped establish Clovis over one hundred years ago, which continues to be a major hub of operations for that railroad and its successor, BNSF Railway. Also notable is the Southwest Cheese Company, the largest cheddar cheese producer in North America.

It is the principal city of the Clovis Micropolitan statistical area, which is part of the larger Clovis-Portales CSA.

== History ==
Clovis began in 1906, when the Atchison, Topeka and Santa Fe Railway was being constructed through the area and railway engineers were instructed to "locate and buy the first level section of land west of Texico" on which to build a town site and railroad facilities.

At first known as "Riley's Switch", the site was renamed Clovis. A likely-apocryphal story states that a daughter of a rail official (accounts vary whether her father was AT&SF president Edward Payson Ripley, chief engineer James Dunn, or an unnamed station master) was studying about Clovis, the first Christian king of the Franks, and proposed the name.

The land was bought on October 2, 1906, and the railroad began offering town lots for sale on May 1, 1907. The settlement built up quickly and in 1909 was incorporated.

On August 24, 2008, eight prisoners escaped from the Clovis Jail by shimmying up plumbing pipes. The escape was highlighted on the television show America's Most Wanted.

Clovis celebrated its centennial in 2009.

The Clovis Carver Public Library was the site of a mass shooting in August 2017 in which two people were killed and four wounded.

In 2023, the FW1 Ute Reservoir pipeline project started construction to provide potable water by 2030 for Cannon Air Force Base and the communities of Clovis, Portales, Elida, and Texico.

== Geography ==
Clovis is located in southeastern Curry County.

U.S. Routes 60, 70, and 84 pass through the city. US 60 and 84 lead west 60 miles (97 km) to Fort Sumner, while US 70 leads southwest 19 miles (31 km) to Portales and 110 miles (180 km) to Roswell. The three highways lead east together to the state line at Texico, New Mexico, and Farwell, Texas. Cannon Air Force Base is 7 miles (11 km) west of the center of Clovis.

According to the United States Census Bureau, the city has a total area of 23.792 square miles (61.62 km^{2}), of which 23.625 square miles (61.19 km^{2}) is land and 0.167 square miles (0.43 km^{2}), or 0.73%, is water from the several artificial ponds in Clovis' multiple public parks.

=== Climate ===
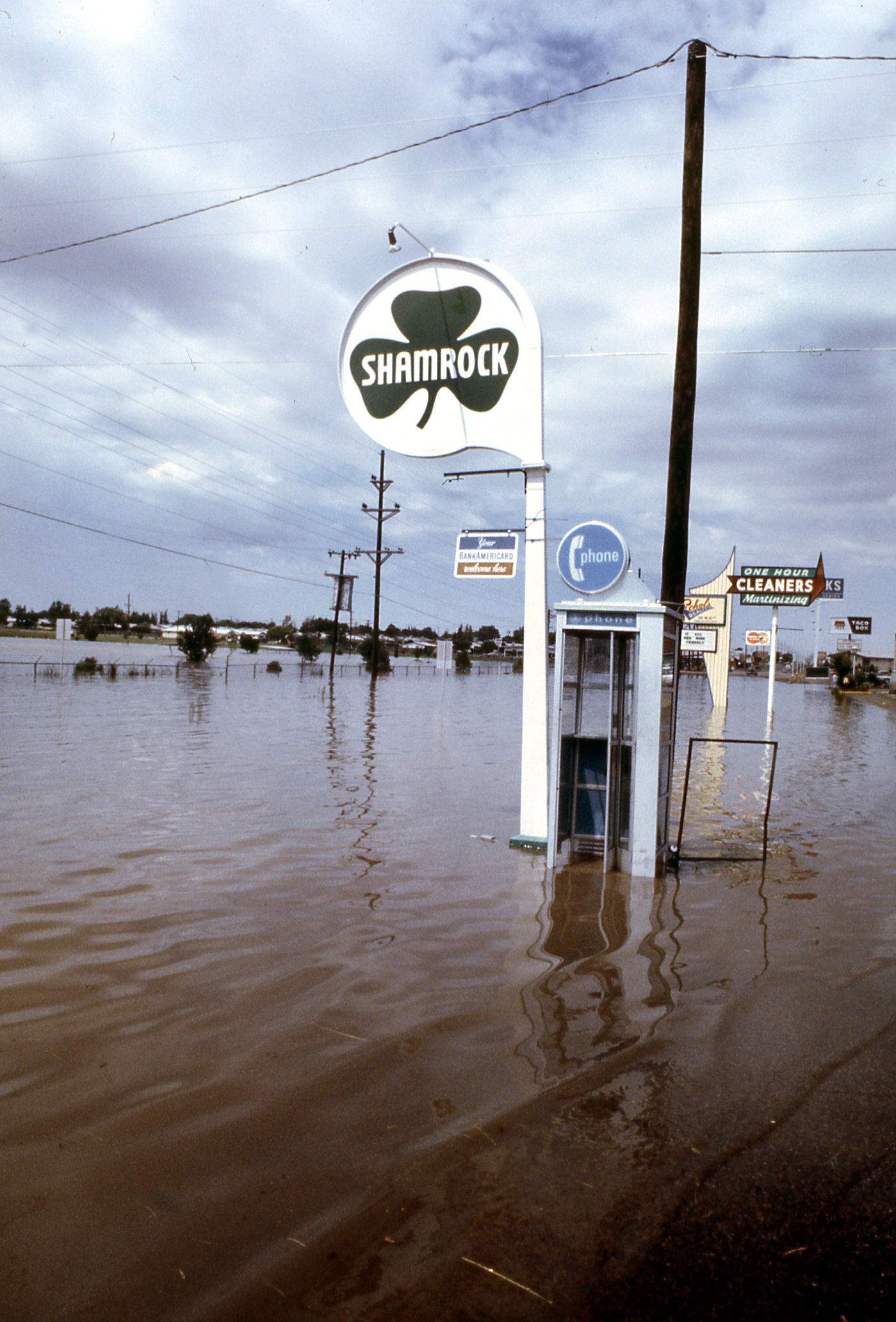
Flooding caused by a thunderstorm, downtown Clovis (1980)

The climate is relatively temperate with low humidity and high winds. Summers are warm with occasional extreme heat and winters are cool with frequent, extreme cold. Severe thunderstorms are often in the spring with rainstorms prevalent during summer evenings. Tornadoes are known to occur and Clovis is located on the southern edge of Tornado Alley. Several inches of snowfall frequently occur each winter, typically for several weeks in January–February, often resulting in minor flooding due to the non-existent runoff system. High winds are common due to the flat, open land and regularly gust well above 30 miles per hour (48 km/h; 13 m/s) and average 12 miles per hour (19 km/h; 5 m/s). According to the Köppen Climate Classification system, Clovis has a semi-arid climate, abbreviated BSk on climate maps.

Climate data for Clovis, New Mexico, 1991–2020 normals, extremes 1949–present
Month	Jan	Feb	Mar	Apr	May	Jun	Jul	Aug	Sep	Oct	Nov	Dec	Year
Record high °F (°C)	79 (26)	82 (28)	95 (35)	95 (35)	102 (39)	109 (43)	106 (41)	104 (40)	102 (39)	93 (34)	88 (31)	79 (26)	109 (43)
Mean maximum °F (°C)	69.4 (20.8)	72.6 (22.6)	81.4 (27.4)	86.8 (30.4)	94.1 (34.5)	100.7 (38.2)	99.9 (37.7)	97.7 (36.5)	94.2 (34.6)	87.3 (30.7)	77.9 (25.5)	69.9 (21.1)	102.4 (39.1)
Mean daily maximum °F (°C)	50.8 (10.4)	55.4 (13.0)	63.9 (17.7)	71.8 (22.1)	80.2 (26.8)	89.7 (32.1)	91.2 (32.9)	89.1 (31.7)	82.7 (28.2)	72.2 (22.3)	60.5 (15.8)	51.1 (10.6)	71.6 (22.0)
Daily mean °F (°C)	36.6 (2.6)	40.2 (4.6)	47.8 (8.8)	55.4 (13.0)	64.4 (18.0)	74.2 (23.4)	76.9 (24.9)	75.3 (24.1)	68.7 (20.4)	57.6 (14.2)	45.8 (7.7)	37.4 (3.0)	56.7 (13.7)
Mean daily minimum °F (°C)	22.4 (−5.3)	25.0 (−3.9)	31.8 (−0.1)	39.0 (3.9)	48.6 (9.2)	58.7 (14.8)	62.7 (17.1)	61.5 (16.4)	54.6 (12.6)	43.1 (6.2)	31.2 (−0.4)	23.7 (−4.6)	41.9 (5.5)
Mean minimum °F (°C)	8.1 (−13.3)	10.2 (−12.1)	16.6 (−8.6)	24.9 (−3.9)	35.0 (1.7)	48.5 (9.2)	55.5 (13.1)	53.7 (12.1)	42.6 (5.9)	27.0 (−2.8)	16.2 (−8.8)	6.7 (−14.1)	1.4 (−17.0)
Record low °F (°C)	−14 (−26)	−17 (−27)	2 (−17)	13 (−11)	20 (−7)	40 (4)	48 (9)	46 (8)	28 (−2)	11 (−12)	0 (−18)	−8 (−22)	−17 (−27)
Average precipitation inches (mm)	0.43 (11)	0.38 (9.7)	0.90 (23)	0.80 (20)	1.70 (43)	2.44 (62)	2.39 (61)	3.07 (78)	2.14 (54)	2.34 (59)	0.50 (13)	0.51 (13)	17.60 (447)
Average snowfall inches (cm)	2.1 (5.3)	1.7 (4.3)	0.9 (2.3)	0.5 (1.3)	0.0 (0.0)	0.0 (0.0)	0.0 (0.0)	0.0 (0.0)	0.0 (0.0)	0.3 (0.76)	1.0 (2.5)	2.1 (5.3)	8.6 (21.76)
Average precipitation days (≥ 0.01 in)	2.3	2.7	3.5	4.0	5.1	6.2	7.1	8.0	5.5	4.7	2.7	2.7	54.5
Average snowy days (≥ 0.1 in)	0.9	1.3	0.6	0.2	0.0	0.0	0.0	0.0	0.0	0.2	0.7	1.4	5.3
Source 1: NOAA
Source 2: xmACIS2

== Demographics ==
Historical population
Census	Pop.	Note	%±
1910	3,255		—
1920	4,904		50.7%
1930	8,027		63.7%
1940	10,065		25.4%
1950	17,318		72.1%
1960	23,713		36.9%
1970	28,495		20.2%
1980	31,194		9.5%
1990	30,954		−0.8%
2000	32,667		5.5%
2010	37,775		15.6%
2020	38,567		2.1%
2023 (est.)	37,612		−2.5%
U.S. Decennial Census; 2020 Census

=== Racial and ethnic composition ===
Clovis city, New Mexico – Racial and ethnic composition Note: the US Census treats Hispanic/Latino as an ethnic category. This table excludes Latinos from the racial categories and assigns them to a separate category. Hispanics/Latinos may be of any race.
Race / Ethnicity (NH = Non-Hispanic)	Pop. 2000	Pop. 2010	Pop. 2020	% 2000	% 2010	% 2020
White alone (NH)	18,176	18,081	15,669	55.64%	47.86%	40.63%
Black or African American alone (NH)	2,270	2,366	2,294	6.95%	6.26%	5.95%
Native American or Alaska Native alone (NH)	186	209	190	0.57%	0.55%	0.49%
Asian alone (NH)	516	490	657	1.58%	1.30%	1.70%
Native Hawaiian or Pacific Islander alone (NH)	28	21	27	0.09%	0.06%	0.07%
Other race alone (NH)	40	51	173	0.12%	0.14%	0.45%
Mixed race or Multiracial (NH)	527	753	1,405	1.61%	1.99%	3.64%
Hispanic or Latino (any race)	10,924	15,804	18,152	33.44%	41.84%	47.07%
Total	32,667	37,775	38,567	100.00%	100.00%	100.00%

=== 2020 census ===
As of the 2020 census, there were 38,567 people, 15,043 households, and 9,551 families residing in the city; 99.0% of residents lived in urban areas and 1.0% lived in rural areas. The median age was 32.6 years; 27.3% of residents were under the age of 18, 7.8% were under 5 years of age, and 13.2% were 65 years of age or older. For every 100 females there were 100.0 males, and for every 100 females age 18 and over there were 98.6 males age 18 and over.

Of the 15,043 households, 34.2% had children under the age of 18 living in them. Of all households, 41.0% were married-couple households, 22.5% were households with a male householder and no spouse or partner present, and 28.6% were households with a female householder and no spouse or partner present. About 29.5% of all households were made up of individuals and 10.2% had someone living alone who was 65 years of age or older.

There were 17,051 housing units, of which 11.8% were vacant. The homeowner vacancy rate was 2.9% and the rental vacancy rate was 12.7%.

Racial composition as of the 2020 census
Race	Number	Percent
White	21,454	55.6%
Black or African American	2,650	6.9%
American Indian and Alaska Native	520	1.3%
Asian	721	1.9%
Native Hawaiian and Other Pacific Islander	29	0.1%
Some other race	6,840	17.7%
Two or more races	6,353	16.5%

=== 2000 census ===
As of the 2000 census, there were 32,667 people, 12,458 households, and 8,596 families residing in the city. The population density was 1,458.9 people per square mile (563.3 people/km^{2}). There were 14,269 housing units at an average density of 637.3 per square mile (246.1/km^{2}). The racial makeup of the city was 71.3% White, 7.3% Black, 1.0% Native American, 1.6% Asian, 0.1% Pacific Islander, 15.0% from other races, and 3.6% from two or more races. Hispanic or Latino were 33.4% of the population.

There were 12,458 households, out of which 36.3% had children under the age of 18 living with them, 49.8% were married couples living together, 14.9% had a female householder with no husband present, and 31.0% were non-families. 26.8% of all households were made up of individuals, and 10.3% had someone living alone who was 65 years of age or older. The average household size was 2.57 and the average family size was 3.12.

In the city, the population was 30.0% under the age of 18, 9.4% from 18 to 24, 28.1% from 25 to 44, 19.5% from 45 to 64, and 13.0% who were ages 65 or older. The median age was 33 years. For every 100 females, there were 92.5 males. For every 100 females age 18 and over, there were 88.1 males.

The median income for a household in the city was $28,878, and the median income for a family was $33,622. Males had a median income of $26,586 versus $20,375 for females. The per capita income for the city was $15,561. About 17.2% of families and 21.0% of the population were below the poverty line, including 28.2% of those under age 18 and 14.6% of those age 65 or over.

=== 2015 income estimate ===
The income for a household, as of 2015, was about $41,000 for the city of Clovis, but for the state of New Mexico as a whole, it averaged around $45,382.

== Economy ==
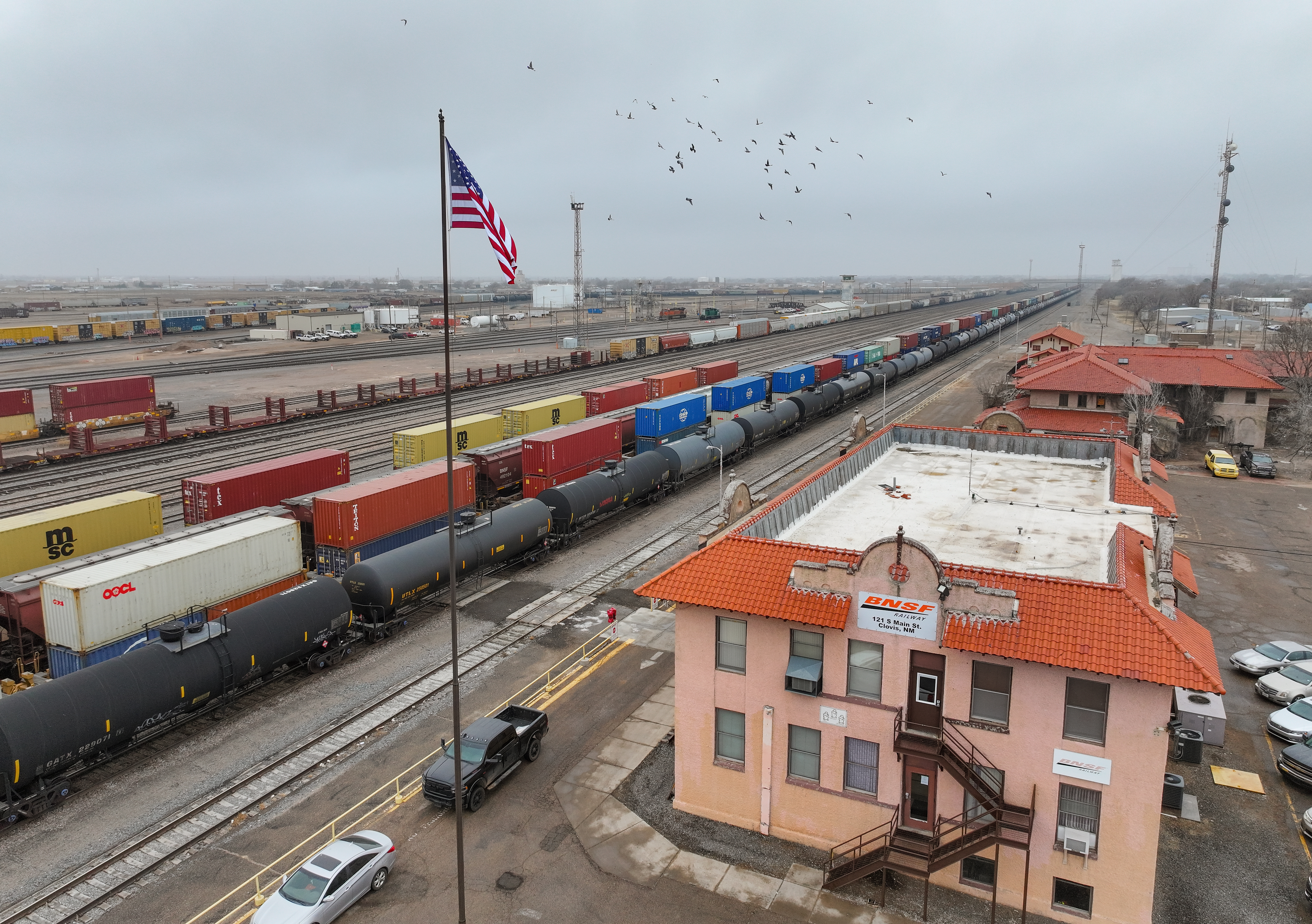
BNSF Clovis Rail Yard

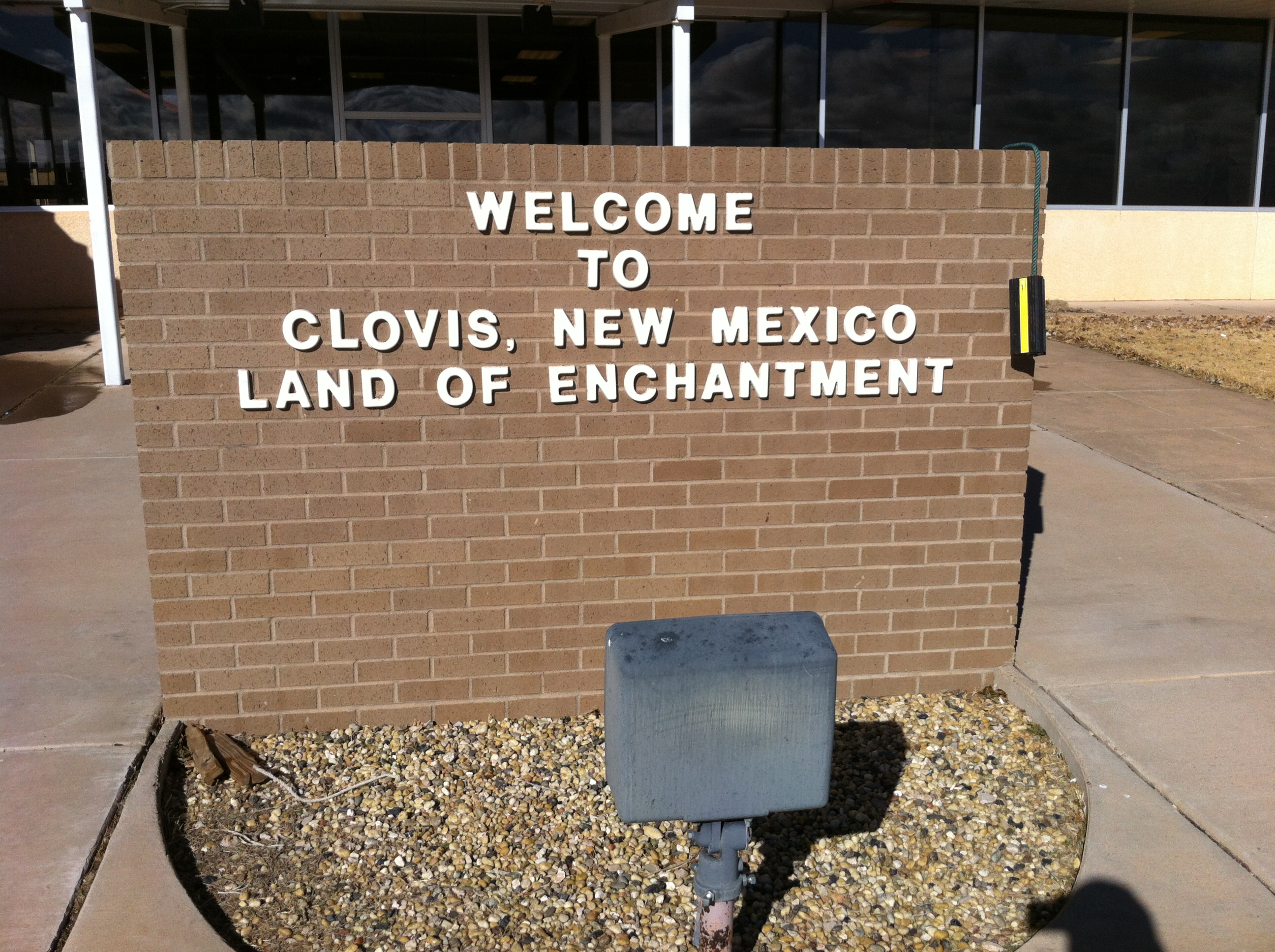
Sign at Clovis Airport

Like most of east-central New Mexico and western Texas, the surrounding area plays host to significant agriculture and ranching activities, including peanut and cotton farming and cattle ranching used for both meat and dairy production. Several processing plants exist for these products; in 2004 construction began on the Southwest Cheese Company plant between Clovis and Portales. The plant commenced operations in late 2005 and provided a small boost to the local economy by employing over 200 personnel. It is one of the largest plants of its type in the world, processing milk provided by the numerous local dairies in excess of 2.3 billion pounds of milk annually.

In 1995, the Santa Fe was merged into the BNSF Railway, which operates a division point and large freight classification yard on its Southern Transcon at Clovis, with a dispatcher's office monitoring traffic over the Belen Cutoff. This 235-mile (378 km) rail corridor is one of the most heavily trafficked routes in the western United States, often with more than 100 mostly intermodal freight trains arriving and leaving Clovis daily. The Southwestern Railroad, formerly the AT&SF Pecos Valley branch line, connects to the BNSF here, shipping potash from mines near Carlsbad.

Clovis is home to Cannon Air Force Base (the 27th Special Operations Wing), Burlington Northern Railroad, the Southwest Cheese Plant, Cummins-Natural Gas Engines, and many locally owned and operated businesses. This community also is surrounded by thousands of acres of farming, ranching, and dairy land. Agriculture is thus a mainstay of the local economy. Many high-school students participate in FFA (Future Farmers of America), where they learn about agriculture. Many local jobs depend on this sector of the economy. According to City-Data.com, the 2016 cost of living index for Clovis was around 83.5, which is well below the national average.

Clovis' location adjacent to Cannon Air Force Base, a special operations base, has had a large impact on the community. Clovis hosts a local organization, the Committee of Fifty, whose stated purpose is to lobby to keep Cannon AFB open; it subsequently helped coordinate the successful campaign which resulted in the realignment of Cannon to its new special ops mission.

Clovis Municipal Airport provides a base for general aviation and daily service by Key Lime Air to and from Denver International Airport and Dallas Fort Worth International Airport.

In addition to the agricultural, military and railroading sectors, music has contributed to the economy of Clovis almost since the city originated. Norman Petty Studios in Clovis is where several different artists have recorded; one of the most famous is Buddy Holly.

== Architecture ==
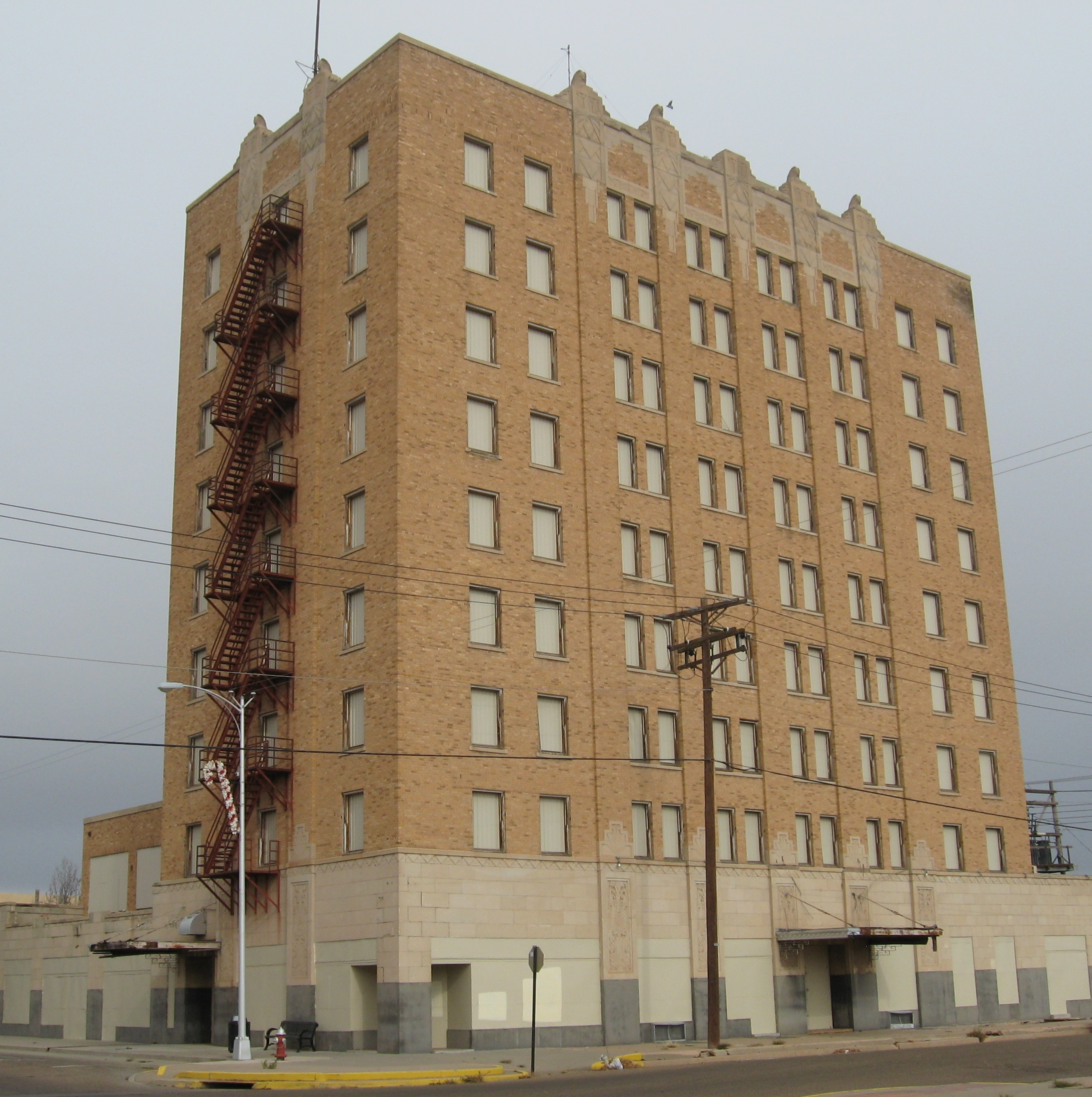
The Hotel Clovis

Southwest, Spanish Mission, or Adobe architectural styles are prevalent, being considered representative of New Mexico. Much of Clovis architecture is indistinguishable from the group of styles prevalent throughout most small American towns and suburbs since the 1930s.

The Hotel Clovis, a local landmark, opened on October 20, 1931. The hotel was designed by architect Robert Merrill, combining an Art Deco exterior with Southwestern Indian interior. The elegant ballroom hosted such names as Louis Armstrong, Glenn Miller, Tommy Dorsey, and Hank Williams, and the nearby train depot supplied the hotel with most of its business. The hotel closed shortly after the Santa Fe Railroad discontinued passenger train service to Clovis in 1971. The building is currently being renovated into affordable housing. As of January 2013, housing is being offered to the community on a first come-first served basis, with some apartments being available now, and others on an "as finished" basis.

Downtown Clovis has three historic movie theaters, including the State Theater.

Clovis is the namesake of stone-age spear points that were found locally in 1929. Clovis points are the characteristically fluted projectile points associated with the North American Clovis culture. These artifacts date to the Paleoindian period, approximately 13,500 years ago.

== Arts and culture ==
=== The arts ===
Performances including music and drama often take place at Clovis Community College, Eastern New Mexico University, and the Lyceum Auditorium, as well as at the Special Events Center, located adjacent to the county fairgrounds. The Clovis Music Festival is a locally high-profile event held annually mid April. The Clovis Civic Center hosts this and other entertainment events. The Special Events Center holds events such as rodeos, auctions, and concerts.

The Clovis-Carver Public Library is located downtown and provides many services. Many resources are available to the public such as books, study and research material, DVDs, access to computers and much more. The library also holds many public functions that are free to the public. These functions can include author readings, summer reading programs for children and adults, and holiday programs. There is also a mobile program that delivers books to patrons who are homebound. The Friends of the Library organization holds biannual used book sales to help raise money for library programs.

=== Music ===
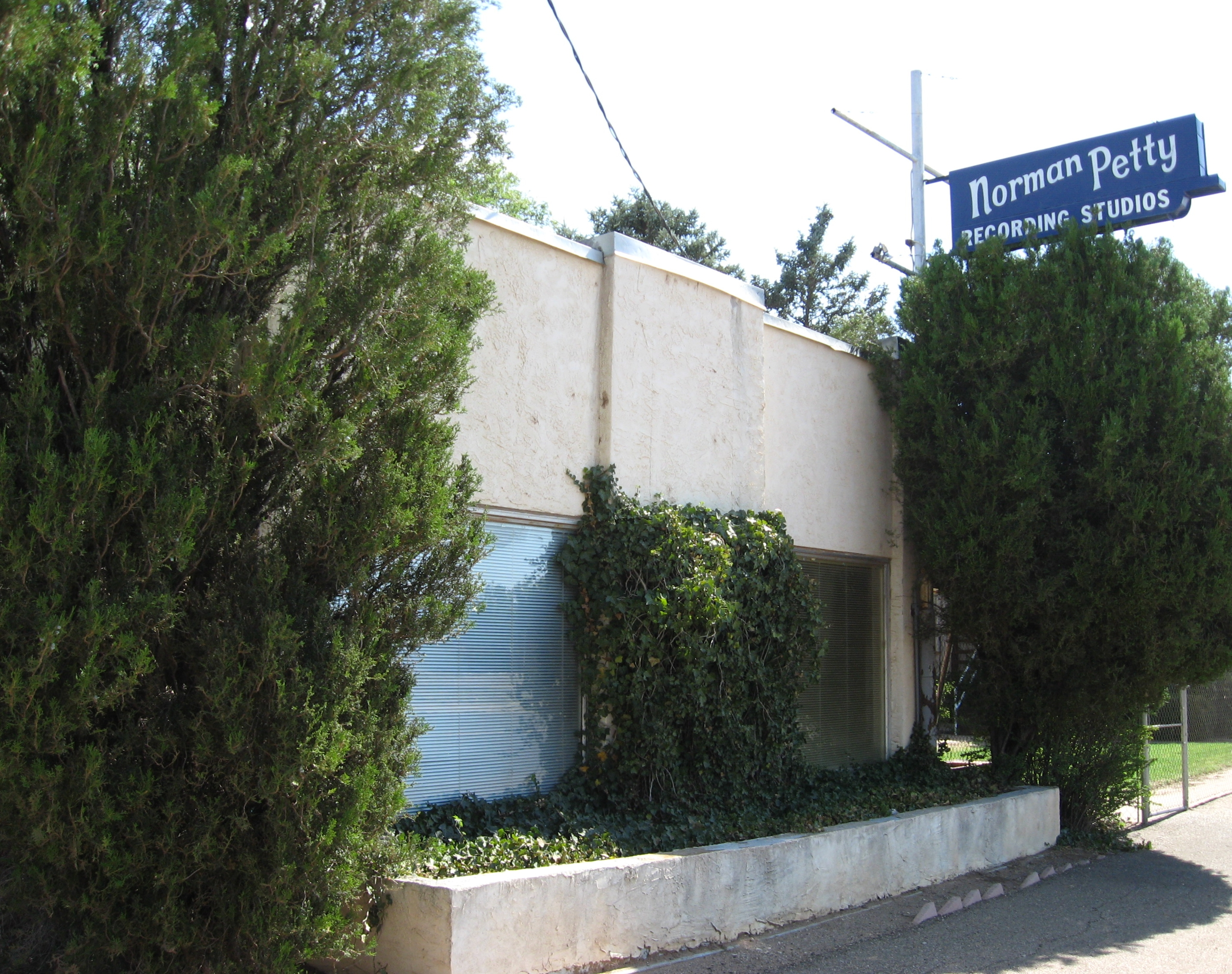
Norman Petty Recording Studios in Clovis

The town was home to the Norman Petty Recording Studios, founded by musician Norman Petty.

== Education ==
=== Public education ===
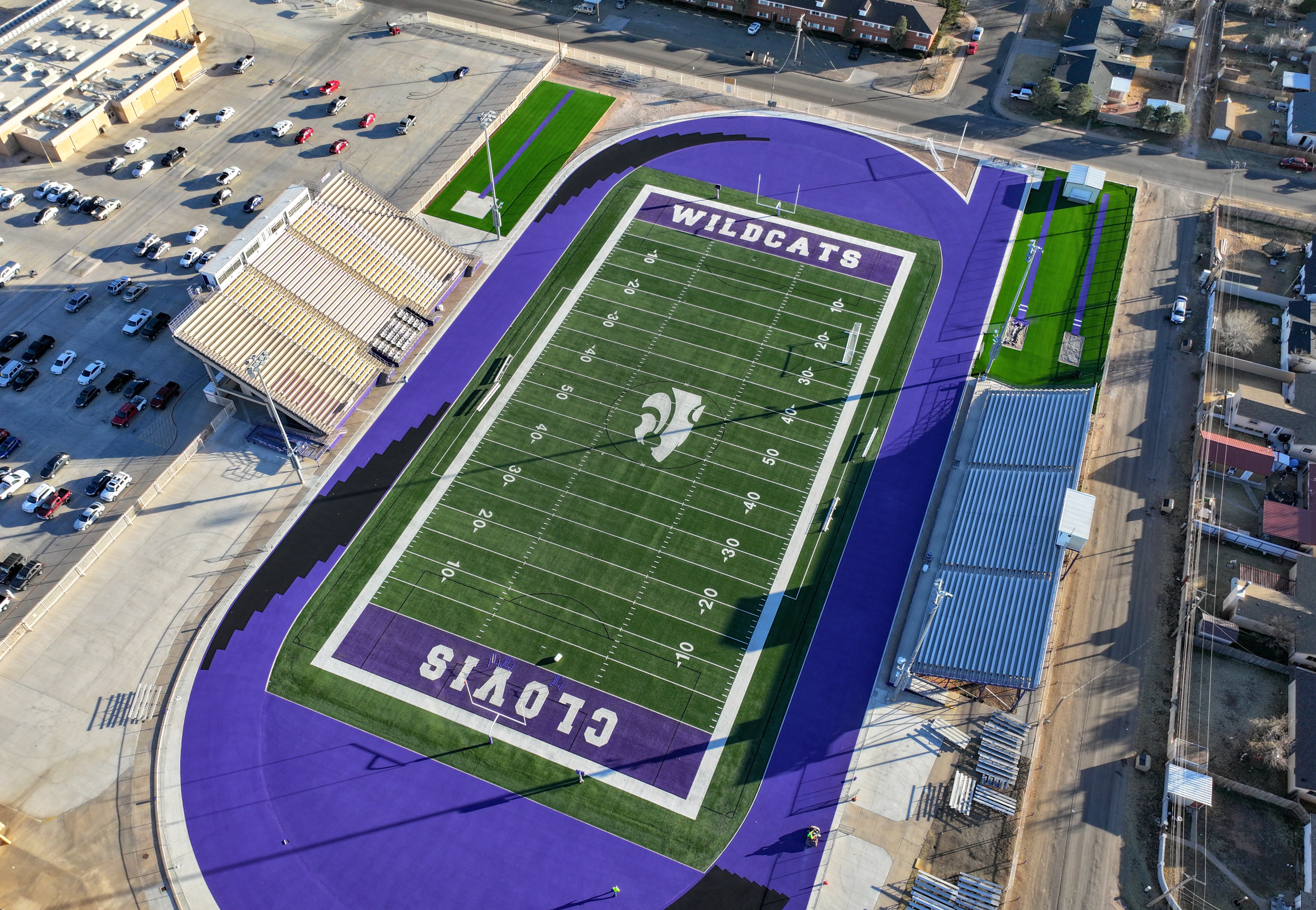
Leon Williams Stadium, home of the Clovis High School Wildcats

Clovis is served by several public schools making up the Clovis Municipal Schools:

- Pre-school
  - Lincoln-Jackson Pre-School
- Elementary schools
  - Arts Academy at Bella Vista
  - Barry Elementary School
  - Highland Elementary School
  - James Bickley Elementary School
  - La Casita Elementary School
  - Mesa Elementary School
  - Parkview Elementary School
  - Sandia Elementary School
  - Zia Elementary School
- Middle schools
  - Gattis Middle School
  - Marshall 6th Grade Academy
  - Yucca Middle School
- Junior high school
  - Clovis High School Freshman Campus
- High school
  - Clovis High School

=== Private schools ===
- Clovis Christian School
- Eastern Plains Early/Head Start

=== Post-secondary education ===
For post-secondary education, there is one community college, Clovis Community College (CCC). Eastern New Mexico University is the nearest university, located 20 miles (32 km) south in Portales.

== In popular culture ==
The city served as the principal filming location for the 2016 feaure film Hell or High Water, which began shooting in May 2015. Three locations in the city were used as banks in the film; the local Suddenlink office at 1106 N Main Street (used in the opening scenes), the Western Bank branch at 901 Pile Street, and an unused, former bank at 2108 N. Main Street. A local restaurant, Bill's Jumbo Burger at 2113 N. Main Street, was also used in the movie.

== Infrastructure ==
=== Health care ===
Plains Regional Medical Center is the primary hospital serving Clovis. It is part of the Presbyterian Healthcare Services based in Albuquerque.

== Notable people ==
- Raul Rosas Jr., mixed martial artist who competes in the UFC's Bantamweight division
- Kenny Bernstein, drag racer and NASCAR and IndyCar team owner
- D.J. Brigman, PGA Tour golfer
- Hank Baskett, professional football player (NFL's Minnesota Vikings, Philadelphia Eagles, Indianapolis Colts)
- Robert C. Brack, district judge
- Howard C. Bratton, lawyer and jurist
- Jack Elton Bresenham, computer scientist
- Bryce Cabeldue, professional football player (NFL's Seattle Seahawks)
- Dennis K. Chesney, astronomer and planet discoverer
- Bruce Cox, photographer
- Jaye Crockett, professional basketball player
- Anna Crook, politician
- Dolores Crow, Idaho state legislator
- Odis Echols, politician, songwriter, lobbyist, and radio broadcaster
- Edwina Garcia, politician
- Brandon Gill, U.S. representative for Texas
- Earl Ben Gilliam, district judge
- Dunny Goode, football coach
- Robert Grant, member of the Kansas House of Representatives
- Wayne Hale, NASA engineer
- Clinton Harden, politician
- Benjamin Harjo Jr., painter and printmaker
- Mark Harris, professional football player (NFL's San Francisco 49ers)
- Carl Hatch, state senator and district judge
- Jerry Haymes, rock n' roll musician
- Nathan Hecht, Chief Justice of the Texas Supreme Court
- Andrew W. Hockenhull, attorney and state governor
- Stuart Ingle, state senator
- Bubba Jennings, basketball coach, Arlington Baptist University men’s team
- Bryce Jordan, university administrator and musicologist
- Carroll Leavell, politician
- Patrick H. Lyons, politician
- Thomas J. Mabry, attorney, politician, and judge
- Fred K. Mahaffey, US Army four-star general
- John F. Mulholland Jr., retired US Army and CIA worker
- Jerry Nuzum, professional football player (NFL's Pittsburgh Steelers)
- Matt Othick, retired NBA player
- Norman Petty, musician, songwriter, record producer
- Charlie Phillips, country music singer/songwriter
- Andrea Reeb, attorney and politician
- Jimmie V. Reyna, lawyer and circuit judge
- Angela Rockwood, model and actress
- Clovis Ruffin, fashion designer
- Alvy Ray Smith, computer scientist
- Gary Urton, anthropologist and specialist in Andean archeology.
- JJ Williams, soccer player
- Martin R. Zamora, politician and farmer
