= Marble Palace (disambiguation) =

Marble Palace is a Neoclassical palace in St. Petersburg, Russia, completed in 1785.

Marble Palace may also refer to:

- Marble Palace (Kolkata), a 19th-century mansion in Kolkata, India
- Marble Palace (Tehran), a 1937 royal residence in Iran
- Palais de Marbre, historic building in Kinshasa, Democratic Republic of the Congo
- Marmorpalais, or "Marble Palace", an 18th-century royal residence in Potsdam, Germany
- Ayuntamiento de Manila (Manila City Hall), in Intramuros, Manila, Philippines
- 280 Broadway, an 1846 building in New York City, US
- United States Supreme Court Building, Washington D.C., US

== See also ==
- Marble House (disambiguation)
