= Otis Putnam House =

Historic house in Massachusetts, United States

- U.S. National Register of Historic Places
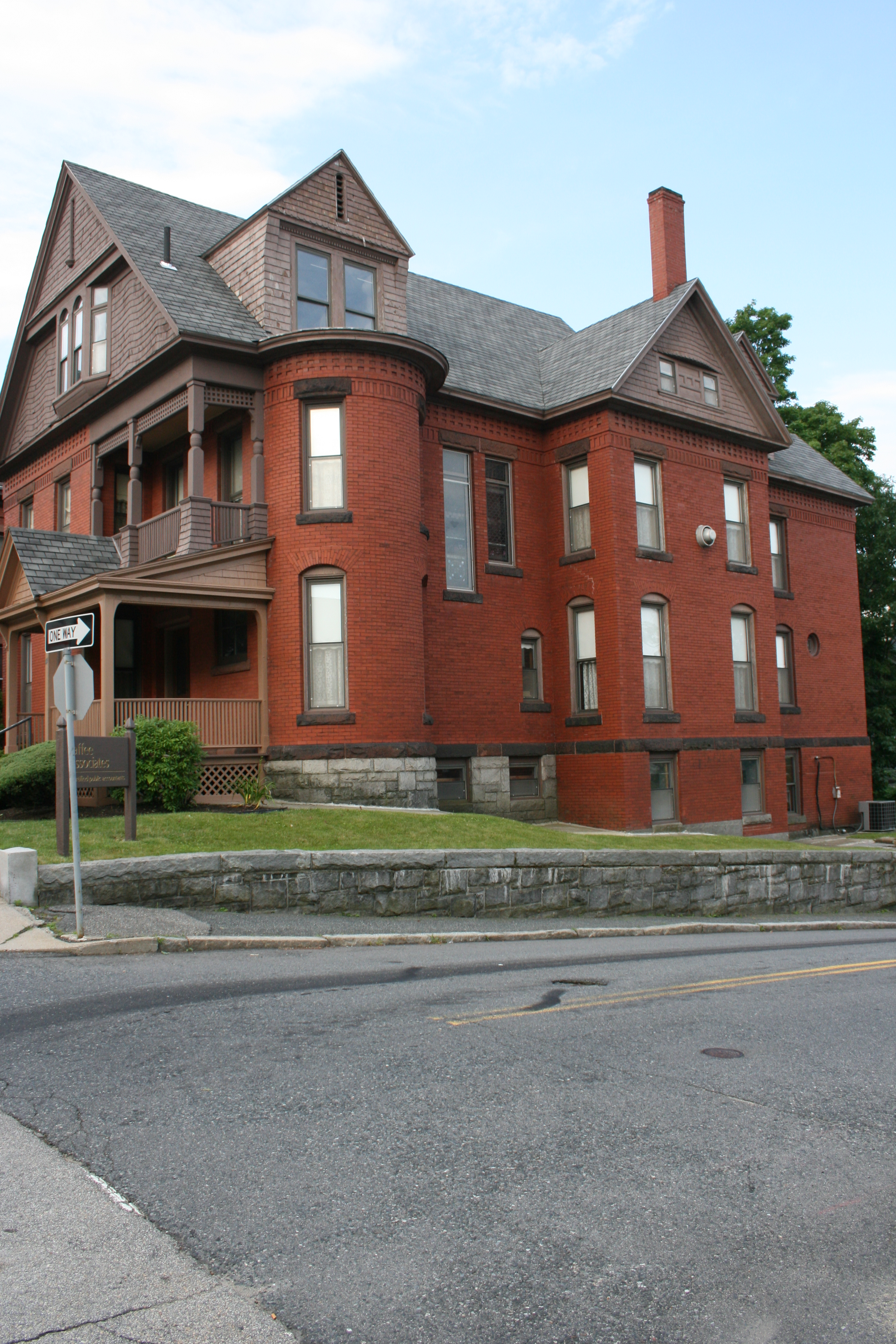

- Location within Massachusetts Location within the United States
- Interactive map showing the location of Otis-Putnam House
- Location: 25 Harvard St., Worcester, Massachusetts
- Coordinates: 42°16′8″N 71°48′11″W
- Built: 1887
- Architect: Fuller & Delano
- Architectural style: Queen Anne
- MPS: Worcester MRA
- NRHP reference No.: 80000565
- Added to NRHP: March 05, 1980

The Otis Putnam House is a historic house at 25 Harvard Street in Worcester, Massachusetts. Built in 1887 to a design by Fuller & Delano for a prominent local department store owner, it is a fine local example of Queen Anne architecture executed in brick. The house was listed on the National Register of Historic Places in 1980. It now houses offices.

== Description and history ==
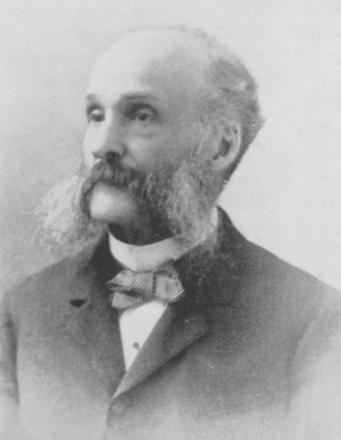
Otis Earle Putnam (1831–1911)

The Putnam House is located on the west side of Harvard Street, a north–south road paralleling downtown Worcester's Main Street on a rise to the west, southwest of its corner with Dix Street, and adjacent to the Jerome Marble House. It is a 2 1/2-story brick building, with a front-facing gable roof and a stone foundation. It is roughly rectangular in plan, with asymmetrical projecting sections to the sides. On its east-facing front facade, a two-story porch is recessed under the gable, with the first-floor section projecting beyond, with a shed roof across part of its width, and a gable above the granite steps. The second-floor porch has turned posts set on shingled piers, with a latticework frieze between them at the top. The main gable is framed in wood and finished in shingles set in a wavy pattern, with a projecting bay at the center with two round-arch windows in the front. First-floor windows are set in segmented-arch openings capped by brick lintels, while second floor windows are in square openings with stone lintels. A band of decorative brickwork acts as a frieze below the roofline.

The house was built in 1887 to a design by Fuller & Delano, and is one of the city's finer examples of Queen Anne brickwork. It was built for Otis Putnam, a native of nearby Leicester who worked his way through the ranks to become a leading partner in one of the city's largest department stores. He also served as a director of the local electric company, and of the Worcester and Holden Street Railway Company.

== See also ==
- National Register of Historic Places listings in northwestern Worcester, Massachusetts
- National Register of Historic Places listings in Worcester County, Massachusetts
