= Marble House (disambiguation) =

Marble House is a Gilded Era mansion in Newport, Rhode Island.

Marble House may also refer to:

- Marble House (song), a song by the Knife

== Places ==
- Jerome Marble House, Worcester, Massachusetts, listed on the National Register of Historic Places
- Thomas Marble Quarry Houses, West Whiteland, Pennsylvania
- Marble House, Berlin, a German cinema

== See also ==
- Marble Schoolhouse, Eastchester, New York, listed on the National Register of Historic Places in Westchester County, New York
- Marble Palace (disambiguation)
