= Bureau of the Treasury =

State agency of the Philippines

- Kawanian ng Ingatang-Yaman

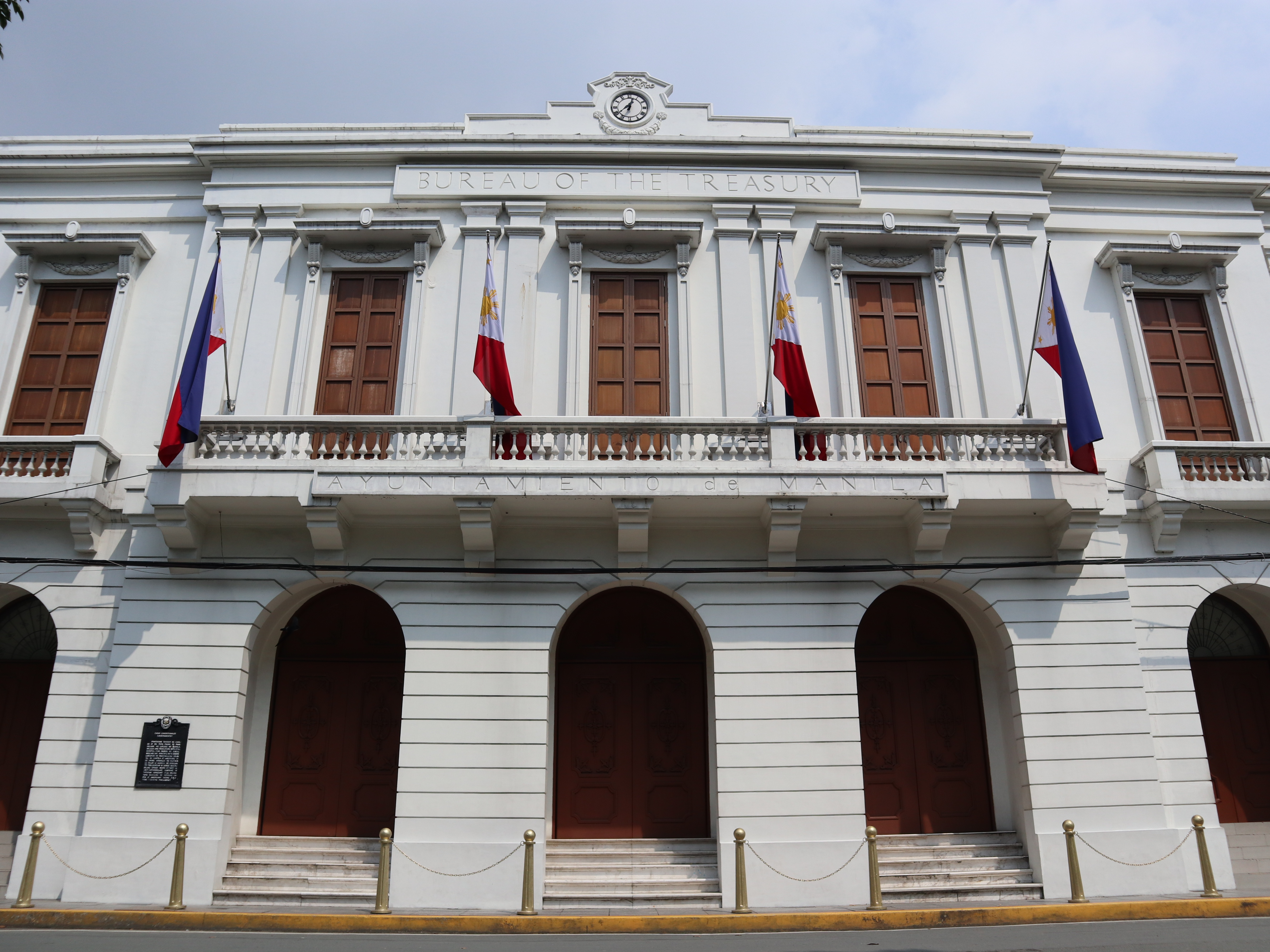
- Ayuntamiento de Manila, official location of the National Treasury

Agency overview
- Formed: November 1, 1897; 129 years ago
- Jurisdiction: Philippines
- Headquarters: Ayuntamiento Building, Cabildo Street corner A. Soriano Avenue, Intramuros, Manila, Philippines
- Agency executive: Sharon Almanza, National Treasurer
- Parent department: Department of Finance
- Website: www.treasury.gov.ph

The Bureau of the Treasury (BTr; Filipino: Kawanian ng Ingatang-Yaman) is an agency of the government of the Philippines under the Department of Finance responsible for managing national funds and public debt. The bureau acts as the principal custodian of financial assets belonging to the national government and its various instrumentalities. Core responsibilities involve the issuance of government securities, the maintenance of financial accounts, and the execution of borrowing policies.

The bureau manages the cash resources of the state and controls the public debt from both foreign and domestic lending sources. The organization formulates operations guidelines for national fiscal and financial policies. It issues and services and redeems government securities while administering the Securities Stabilization Fund. It also coordinates with other government bodies to prepare annual projections for revenue and expenditure targets along with borrowing levels. The central office currently operates from the historic Ayuntamiento Building located in the Intramuros district of Manila. The bureau is headed by the National Treasurer and the President of the Philippines holds the authority to appoint the Treasurer based on the official recommendation of the Secretary of Finance.

== History ==
The First Philippine Republic established a Supreme Council under the Biak-na-Bato Constitution on November 1, 1897. The Supreme Council included a specific position for a Secretary of the Treasury. President Emilio Aguinaldo formally appointed Baldomero Aguinaldo to serve as the first national Treasurer on November 2, 1897. The primary responsibility of this early office centered on the imposition and collection of taxes to fund the revolutionary government.

The American colonial administration completely reorganized the financial system of the islands at the turn of the twentieth century. The Philippine Commission headed by William H. Taft created the Bureau of Insular Treasury through a legislative act on October 3, 1900. The new entity received the mandate to receive and disburse public funds while accounting for all financial transactions. The law also directed the Bureau of Insular Treasury to supervise the banks operating across the country. The Philippine Commission subsequently passed Act No. 222 on September 6, 1901. This legislation placed the Bureau of Insular Treasury under the executive control of the Department of Finance and Justice. The government enacted another extensive reorganization through Act No. 1407 on October 26, 1905. The legislation reduced the total number of government bureaus by consolidating various administrative offices. The Philippine Commission passed Act No. 1679 to amend the previous law and officially rename the agency to the Bureau of the Treasury. The legislation assigned the additional task of coinage and currency supervision to the newly renamed institution.

The organizational scope of the agency experienced several changes during the next few decades as the domestic financial system matured. The Philippine Legislature passed the Bonding Law based on a provision of the Administrative Code of 1917 to regulate the handling of public funds. The Bureau of Banking assumed the responsibility of supervising the banks of the country from the Bureau of the Treasury in 1929.

The Philippine government enacted Republic Act No. 265 in 1949 to establish a monetary authority. This law transferred the functions of coinage and currency printing from the Bureau to the newly organized Central Bank of the Philippines. The agency expanded its local presence by opening treasury branches throughout the country in 1965.

The implementation of the Integrated Reorganization Plan under Republic Act 6130 reorganized the Bureau into three functional services in 1971. The three services consisted of the Financial and Administrative Service and the Cash Operations Service and the Public Debt Management office. The government established regional offices across the country to improve service delivery at the local level. The initial regional locations included San Fernando and Batangas and Legaspi and Cebu and Zamboanga and Davao and Cagayan de Oro among other cities.

President Corazon Aquino issued Executive Order 127 on January 30, 1987 to reorganize the Ministry of Finance during the transition to the 1987 constitution. The executive order gave the Bureau of the Treasury the mandate to formulate policies on financial management and public borrowing and capital market development. The order required the agency to prepare annual projections of revenues and expenditures in coordination with the National Economic and Development Authority and the Department of Budget and Management.

Republic Act No. 7653 was enacted in 1993 to create the modern Bangko Sentral ng Pilipinas. The new law transferred specific fiscal agency functions from the central bank directly to the Department of Finance in 1995. The Bureau of the Treasury assumed the responsibility for the issue and service and redemption of all government securities as a direct result of this transfer.

The bureau began to manage the Bond Sinking Fund and the Securities Stabilization Fund as the official fiscal agent of the national government. The Bureau introduced the Automated Debt Auction Processing System in 1995 to conduct electronic auctions of government debt instruments. It launched the Registry of Scripless Securities in 1997 to eliminate the costs and risks associated with moving physical paper securities.

The bureau implemented the Small Investors Program in 1998 to distribute government securities to a wider retail audience. It offered Small-Denominated Treasury Bonds for the first time in 1999 as a core component of this financial inclusion initiative. The government listed these small-denominated bonds on the Philippine Stock Exchange on January 15, 2001. It also established the BTr Provident Fund as a non-stock institution to provide benefits to employees in 2000.

The central office of the Bureau of the Treasury relocated to the Ayuntamiento Building in the Intramuros district of Manila following a restoration project. The national government funded a ₱1.3 billion reconstruction of the building between 2009 and 2013 to restore its nineteenth-century neoclassical appearance. The bureau officially occupied the newly rebuilt Ayuntamiento Building in 2013 to serve as its permanent national headquarters.

== Symbols ==
The official seal of the bureau commemorates this inception year of 1897. The flag on the seal represents the national coverage of the organization. The eagle symbol represents the capacity to watch over national funds and soar to greater heights of achievement. The key symbol represents the vaults where the funds of the republic remain safely kept.

== Legal mandate ==
Executive Order No. 449 serves as the legal instrument defining the current organizational structure and statutory mandate of the Bureau of the Treasury. President Fidel Ramos issued this directive on October 17, 1997 to realign the functional groupings of the agency. The reorganization aimed to help the institution manage the fiscal agency functions previously transferred from the central bank. The directive establishes the bureau as the principal custodian of all financial assets belonging to the national government and its various instrumentalities. The order mandates the institution to formulate operations guidelines for national fiscal and financial policies.. It requires the Bureau to assist in the formulation of policies regarding public borrowing and investment and capital market development..

The bureau holds a strict legal mandate to manage the cash resources of the national government. The statutory mandate includes the collection of advances made by the national government and the guarantee of forward cover fees due to the state. The Bureau must control and service the public debt generated from both foreign and domestic lending sources. The legal framework authorizes the agency to issue and service and redeem government securities for the account of the national government. The President of the Philippines provides the final official authorization for these securities issuances pursuant to existing laws. The institution is mandated to administer the Securities Stabilization Fund. The law directs the agency to purchase and sell government bills and bonds in the open market to increase the liquidity of the securities. The process stabilizes the value of government debt instruments and encourages private investment in the local bond market. The Bureau must maintain the official books of accounts for all cash transactions executed by the national government.

The Revised Administrative Code of 1917 established the Public Bonding Law under Sections 313 to 335 to hold government employees financially accountable for public funds. Executive Order No. 449 reaffirmed the mandate of the Bureau of the Treasury to bond all accountable public officials and employees across the government bureaucracy. The agency issues Treasury Circulars to promulgate regulations governing the effective bonding of accountable public officers.

Republic Act No. 1000 provides additional legal mandates for the agency regarding debt management. The law requires the institution to certify allowable debt and guarantee levels for the state. The legislation directs the Bureau to manage the regular contributions to the Bond Sinking Fund and to administer the fund itself. The agency must offset corporate cash dividends and guarantee fees and loan advances from the budgetary support provided to government-owned and controlled corporations.

The bureau adheres to Republic Act No. 11032 known as the Ease of Doing Business and Efficient Government Service Delivery Act of 2018. The agency fulfills this legal requirement through the creation and implementation of a Citizen's Charter. The charter serves as a comprehensive guide outlining the standards of service rendered by the bureau to the transacting public. The bureau commits to a defined quality policy to provide transparent and responsive and cost-efficient treasury services. The agency adheres to applicable laws while upholding financial integrity and operational efficiency. The internal credo of the organization requires all civil servants to value integrity and professionalism while carrying out duties with competence and diligence.

== Functions and responsibilities ==
The daily operations of the Bureau of the Treasury involve several specialized functions divided into cash management and debt management and accounting services. The agency receives all national tax collections and budgetary expenditures and foreign and domestic financial obligations. The bureau deposits all collections received during the day with authorized government depository banks on the exact same business day.

The bureau maximizes the earnings of government funds by investing idle cash balances in high-yielding interest-bearing accounts.. The process ensures that the government meets its immediate financial obligations while generating additional revenue from treasury operations. It collects interest income on national government deposits held at the central bank and other banking institutions. It processes escheat proceedings for unclaimed balances held in various financial institutions to revert these funds to the national treasury.

The public debt management function requires the bureau to execute borrowing strategies to finance the national budget deficit. The institution conducts regular public auctions of Treasury Bills and Treasury Bonds to raise necessary domestic capital. It manages the sovereign yield curve by timing the maturities of the debt instruments it offers to the financial market. The bureau executes liability management exercises such as bond exchange transactions to switch expensive near-term debt for longer-term securities. The strategy helps the government manage refinancing risks and extend the maturity profile of the public debt portfolio. The organization manages external borrowing through concessional loans and the issuance of global bonds in international capital markets. The agency monitors all data on the availments and repayments of public debts to ensure accurate financial records.

The accounting function involves maintaining the detailed subsidiary ledger accounts of the national government. The agency prepares detailed financial statements and fiscal reports for the executive department and the national legislature. The bureau computes guarantee fees and calculates interest on advances provided to government corporations. It issues billings and collection statements to ensure that the government recovers its financial claims from state-owned enterprises. It accounts for all liabilities transferred to the national government from other entities. It also serves as the primary custodian of government holdings in non-cash accounts and securities for safekeeping purposes. The staff reconcile cash balances and prepare statements of accountable forms such as official receipts and checks.

The fidelity bonding of accountable public officers represents a specific function dedicated to protecting public funds from fraud and malfeasance. The agency processes applications for fidelity bonds from all government employees who handle cash or state property. The institution maintains a national database of bonded officials through an online fidelity bonding system. The organization evaluates formal claims filed against the Fidelity Fund in cases of defalcation or verified shortage of funds. The agency recommends the approval of valid claims to financially compensate the affected government units.

== Governance structure ==
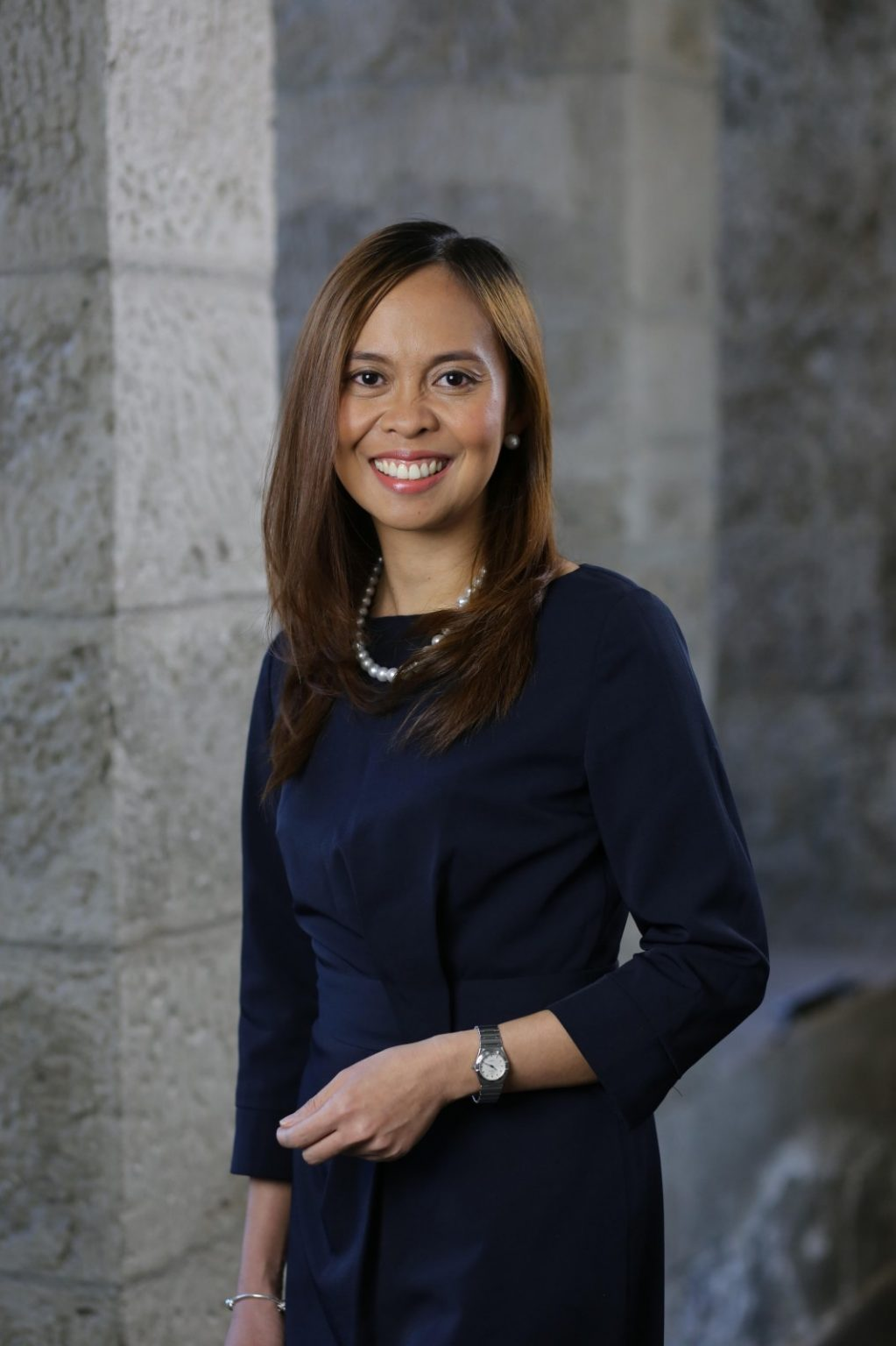
Sharon Almanza, National Treasurer

The National Treasurer heads the Bureau of the Treasury and directs all national operations. The President of the Philippines appoints the Treasurer based entirely on the recommendation of the Secretary of Finance.

The organizational structure divides the central office into three functional subsectors under the provisions of Executive Order No. 449. The Planning and Policy Subsector handles the strategic direction and economic forecasting of the agency. A designated Deputy Treasurer heads this specific subsector.

The subsector includes the Research Service which prepares annual plans regarding the inflow of funds from tax revenues and debt sources. The Research Service formulates internal policies for the management of cash resources and domestic debt and financial assets. The unit assesses the practical results of treasury operations in relation to national government fiscal policies. The personnel conduct research and policy studies to improve overall treasury management.

The Operations Subsector executes the primary financial transactions and market interventions of the government. The Liability Management Service falls under this subsector and focuses on the issuance and servicing of the public debt.

The Asset Management Service handles the daily investment of idle cash and the administration of the Bond Sinking Fund and the Securities Stabilization Fund.

The National Government Accounting Service maintains the official financial ledgers and prepares the consolidated financial statements of the government. The staff interlink the revenue and expenditure operations of the government to monitor cash flows accurately. The Auxiliary Subsector provides essential administrative and technical support services to the entire organization.

The Administrative Service procures office supplies and materials while maintaining the building premises and physical properties of the agency. The unit administers personnel management programs including the recruitment and selection and promotion of treasury employees.

The Management Information Systems Service provides technological support and software maintenance to all operating units requiring computer systems.

The Legal Service handles pending legal matters and escheat proceedings while providing legal advice to the management team. The Internal Audit and Security Service evaluates the internal control procedures of the agency to ascertain the adequacy of the control system.

The security unit formulates measures to protect treasury officials and provides armed escort services to the National Cashier when withdrawing cash from the central bank.

The bureau operates an extensive network of regional and provincial offices across the Philippine archipelago. The Regional Offices report directly to the Treasurer of the Philippines in Manila. The regional operations cover areas including the National Capital Region and Cordillera Administrative Region and Caraga along with Regions one through twelve. The field offices physically examine the official books of accounts of national collecting officers and local municipal treasurers. The regional directors monitor the financial reports of provincial offices and provide technical advice to government field representations regarding treasury operations. The local units accept applications for fidelity bonds and process initial claims for submission to the central office. The regional staff ensure compliance with national financial regulations at the local government level.

== Milestones ==
=== Automation and digitization ===
The bureau launched the Automated Debt Auction Processing System in 1995 to replace outdated manual bidding processes. The system is an electronic auction that allowed for faster and highly accurate auctions of Treasury Bills and Treasury Bonds. The electronic system increased transaction transparency in the financial markets and encouraged greater participation from primary institutional dealers.

The bureau also introduced the Registry of Scripless Securities in 1997 to completely eliminate physical paper bond certificates. The system transitioned the domestic market to electronic and real-time financial transactions. The electronic registry eliminated the severe risks of loss and theft previously associated with physical paper certificates. The innovation reduced the administrative costs of issuing and transferring government securities across the banking system. The agency upgraded this platform to the National Registry of Scripless Securities to further support local capital market development.

=== Financial inclusion and the retail treasury bonds ===
The bureau initiated financial inclusion programmes through the Small Investors Program in 1998. The program aimed to democratize the ownership of government securities by offering instruments with lower minimum denomination requirements.

The bureau began offering Retail Treasury Bonds to individual retail investors to provide a risk-free and affordable investment option. The issuance of Retail Treasury Bonds mobilized domestic savings and expanded the investor base of the national government beyond traditional institutional buyers. It recorded participation in subsequent public offerings to raise hundreds of billions of pesos for national infrastructure and development projects. The Bureau issued innovative tokenized treasury bonds between 2023 and 2024 to test the application of blockchain technology in the domestic capital market.

=== Secondary market liquidity ===
The Philippine government achieved a level of secondary market liquidity for government securities in 2025 due to the efforts of the bureau. Data from the bureau indicated that the secondary market trading volume climbed to ₱ 12.68 trillion by the end of 2025. The final figure represented a nearly fourfold increase compared to the ₱2.98 trillion recorded in 2022. The achievement validated the long-term strategy of the agency to deepen the government securities market by building reliable yield benchmarks and modernizing market trading infrastructure. The turnover ratios for five-year and seven-year and ten-year benchmark bonds rose significantly during the assessed period. The overall market depth improved with the government securities turnover ratio reaching 1.05 based on higher daily trading volumes and closer coordination with primary dealers.

=== International borrowing ===
The bureau executed international borrowing strategies to diversify the funding sources of the Philippines. The Philippines returned to the global bond market in January 2026 with a triple-tranche bond sale consisting of five-and-a-half-year and ten-year and twenty-five-year notes. The issuance followed a series of successful international offerings including a dual-currency dollar and euro issuance in January 2025 and a 2.5 billion dollar offering in August 2024. The global bonds received investment-grade credit ratings from major international rating agencies prior to the auction. The international transactions allowed the government to secure cost-efficient funding to support its development priorities while maintaining a sustainable debt profile.

== Sovereign wealth fund ==
The bureau played an administrative role in the establishment and operationalization of the Maharlika Investment Corporation and the Maharlika Investment Fund. Republic Act No. 11954 was enacted in 2023 to create the first sovereign wealth fund of the country. The bureau drafted and issued the official Implementing Rules and Regulations for the law on August 28 2023. The law authorized a total capitalization of ₱500 billion for the corporation to invest in public road networks and tollways and green energy projects. The capital structure divided the total amount into ₱375 billion worth of common shares and ₱125 billion worth of preferred shares. The bureau transferred the initial seed capital of ₱50 billion from the national government directly to the Maharlika Investment Corporation. The Land Bank of the Philippines and the Development Bank of the Philippines remitted their respective statutory contributions of ₱50 billion and ₱25 billion to the bureau for the benefit of the fund.

The national government sourced its ₱50 billion contribution from the declared dividends of the central bank and the income share of the state gaming corporation. The board of the Maharlika Investment Corporation appointed the Bureau of the Treasury as the interim fund manager during its inaugural meeting on January 3, 2024. The Maharlika Investment Corporation remitted ₱1.376 billion in cash dividends back to the treasury in 2026 to support government priorities.

== Question on the transfer of PhilHealth funds to the national treasury ==
A controversy involving the Bureau of the Treasury erupted over the mandatory transfer of excess reserve funds from the Philippine Health Insurance Corporation (PhilHealth) to the national government. The Department of Finance issued Circular No. 003-2024 to direct the transfer of ₱89.9 billion from the health insurance agency to the National Treasury. The directive aimed to fund unprogrammed appropriations using the supposedly excess reserve funds of various government-owned and controlled corporations. The directive relied entirely on Special Provision 1(d) of the 2024 General Appropriations Act which authorized the return of such funds to the National Treasury. The Philippine Health Insurance Corporation remitted ₱60 billion to the Bureau of the Treasury in three separate financial tranches to comply with the directive. The Bureau intended to use the transferred capital to support national priority programs and infrastructure projects.

Several political coalitions and health advocates filed multiple petitions before the Supreme Court to challenge the legality of the fund transfer. The consolidated petitions included cases filed by Aquilino Pimentel III and Neri Colmenares and the 1Sambayan Coalition against the executive and legislative branches. The petitioners argued that the action violated Section 11 of the Universal Healthcare Act. The referenced section requires the health insurance agency to use all excess reserve funds exclusively to increase member health benefits or reduce premium contributions. The law explicitly prohibits the transfer of any portion of the reserve fund to the national government or its subsidiary agencies. The government defended the transfer during the oral arguments by claiming that the excess funds were idle and unutilized.

The executive branch argued that the transfer would maximize government resources to fund flood control projects and other infrastructure without requiring new taxes or additional public borrowing. Former Finance Secretary Ralph Recto defended the directive as a common-sense approach to optimize government coffers.

The Supreme Court issued a unanimous legal decision on December 3, 2025 to nullify the fund transfer. Associate Justice Amy Lazaro-Javier authored the 136-page decision declaring the executive action a grave abuse of discretion amounting to a lack of jurisdiction. The high tribunal ordered the national government to return the transferred ₱60 billion to the health insurance agency. The court issued a permanent legal injunction against the planned transfer of the remaining ₱29.9 billion. The justices struck down Special Provision 1(d) of the 2024 General Appropriations Act for being an unconstitutional legislative rider. The final ruling stated that the budget provision was not germane to the primary purpose of the appropriations law. The court noted that the transfer undermined the core concept of pooled resources for social health insurance and violated the constitutional right of the people to accessible public health care.

The Supreme Court directed the Bureau of the Treasury to set aside the collected amounts specifically for the strict implementation of the Universal Healthcare Act. The executive department acknowledged the judicial order and committed to returning the funds without filing a motion for reconsideration. The Office of the Solicitor General announced that the entire government would respect the decision of the court and follow the constitutional path clarified by the justices. The legislative branch assured the public that the ₱60 billion would be reallocated back to the health insurance agency during the budget deliberations for the succeeding fiscal year. The national government ultimately agreed to restore the funds through a specific item in the 2026 national budget.
