= Ayuntamiento de Manila =

Government building in Manila, Philippines

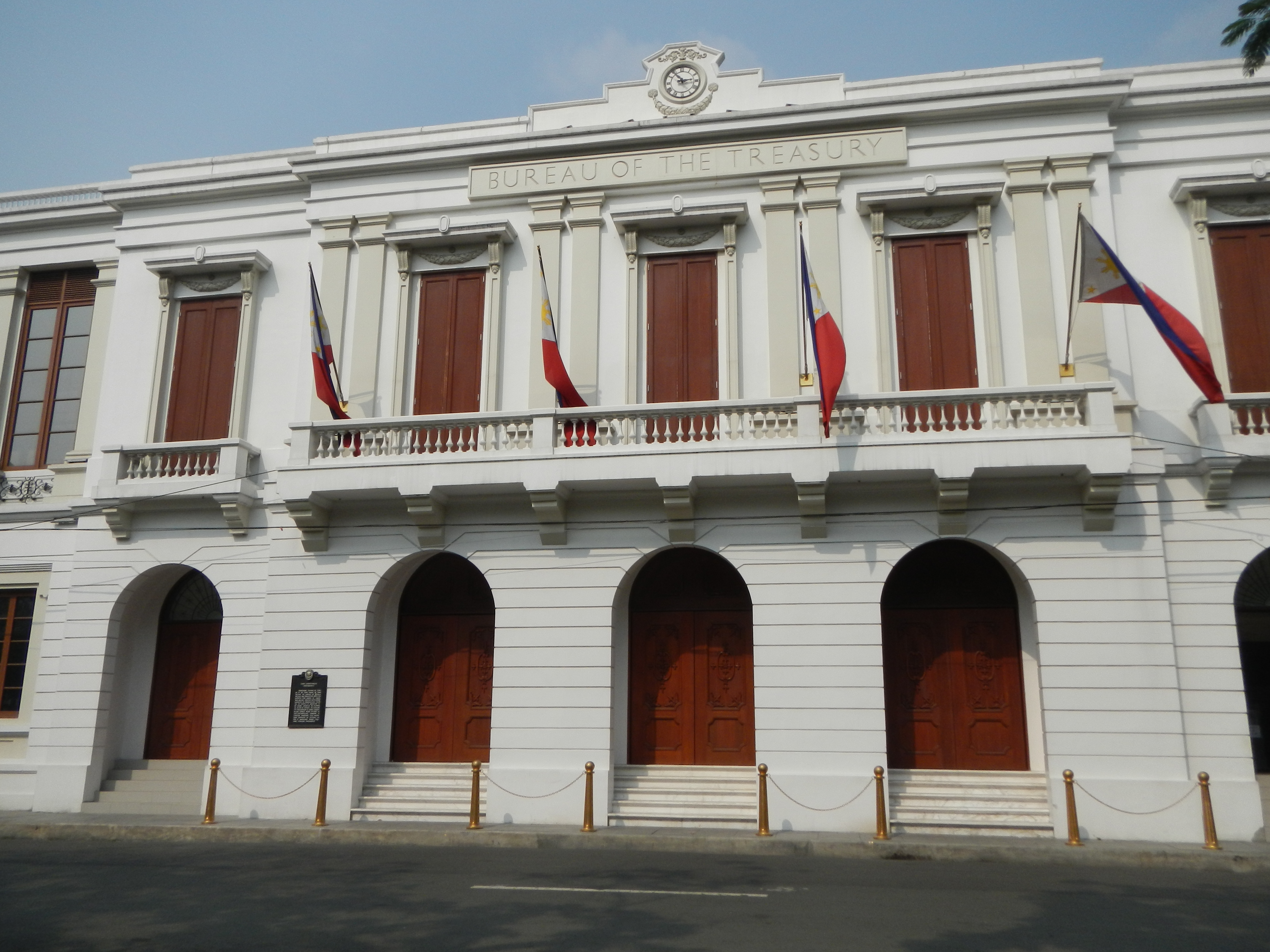
- The façade of the reconstructed Ayuntamiento facing Plaza de Roma
- Interactive map of the Ayuntamiento de Manila area
- Alternative names: Casas Consistoriales, Marble Palace

General information
- Status: Completed
- Architectural style: Neoclassical
- Location: Cabildo Street, Intramuros, Manila, Philippines
- Coordinates: 14.59262°N 120.97362°E
- Current tenants: Bureau of the Treasury
- Completed: 1738, reconstructed 1884
- Opened: 2013 (latest reconstruction)
- Destroyed: 1863, 1945
- Landlord: Government of the Philippines

Technical details
- Floor count: 4
- Grounds: 5.6 hectares (14 acres)

Design and construction
- Architect: Felipe Roxas

The Ayuntamiento de Manila (Manila City Hall) is a building located at the corner of Andrés Soriano Avenue (formerly, Calle Aduana) and Cabildo Street, fronting Plaza de Roma in Intramuros, Manila, Philippines. Also known as the Casas Consistoriales and also nicknamed as the Marble Palace, the Ayuntamiento was the seat of the Manila City Council, which consisted of two alcaldes (city leaders), eight oidores (judges), a clerk, and a chief constable. Destroyed in World War II and reconstructed thereafter, the building now houses the offices of the Bureau of the Treasury.

== History ==
National historical markers

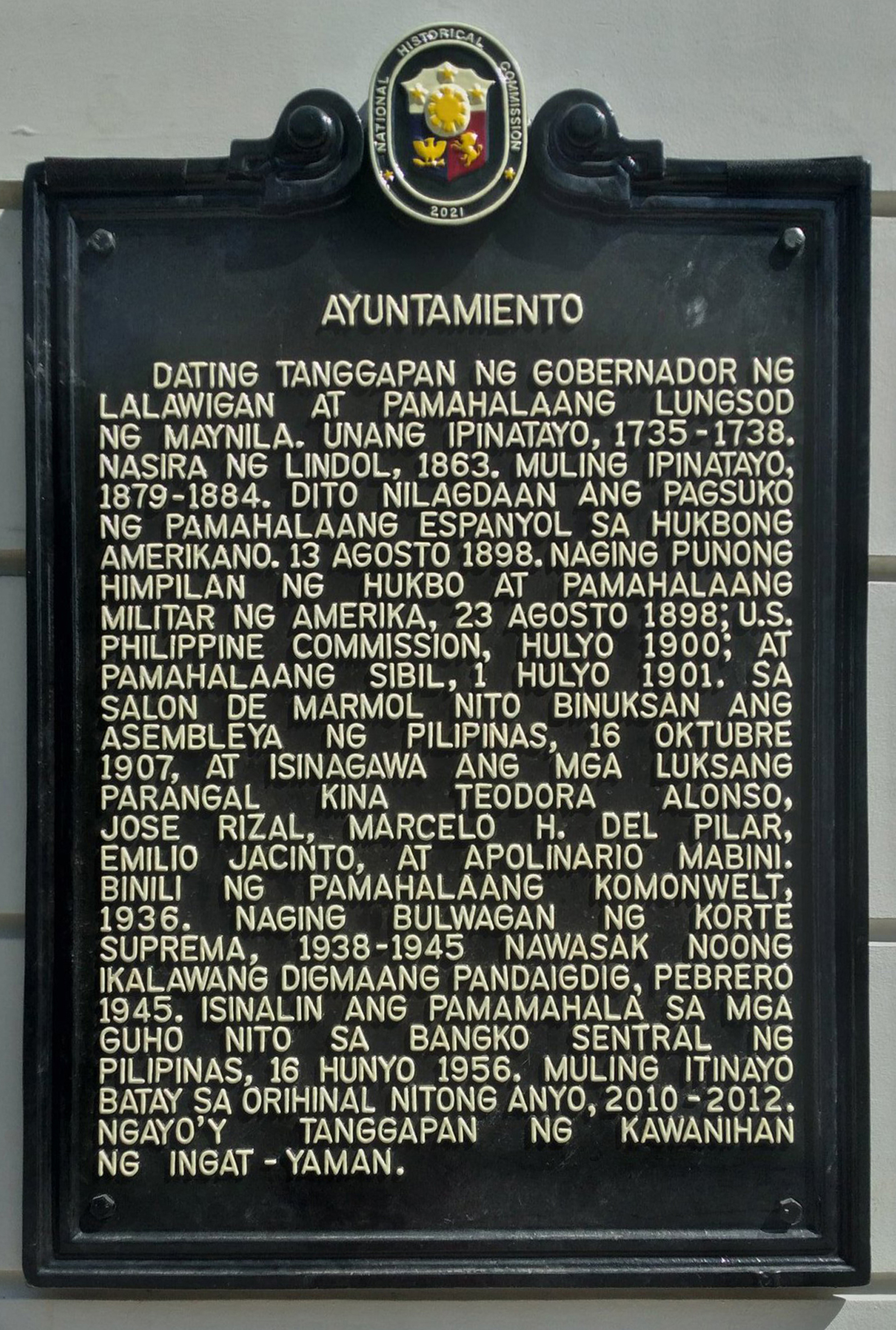
Marker unveiled in 2021

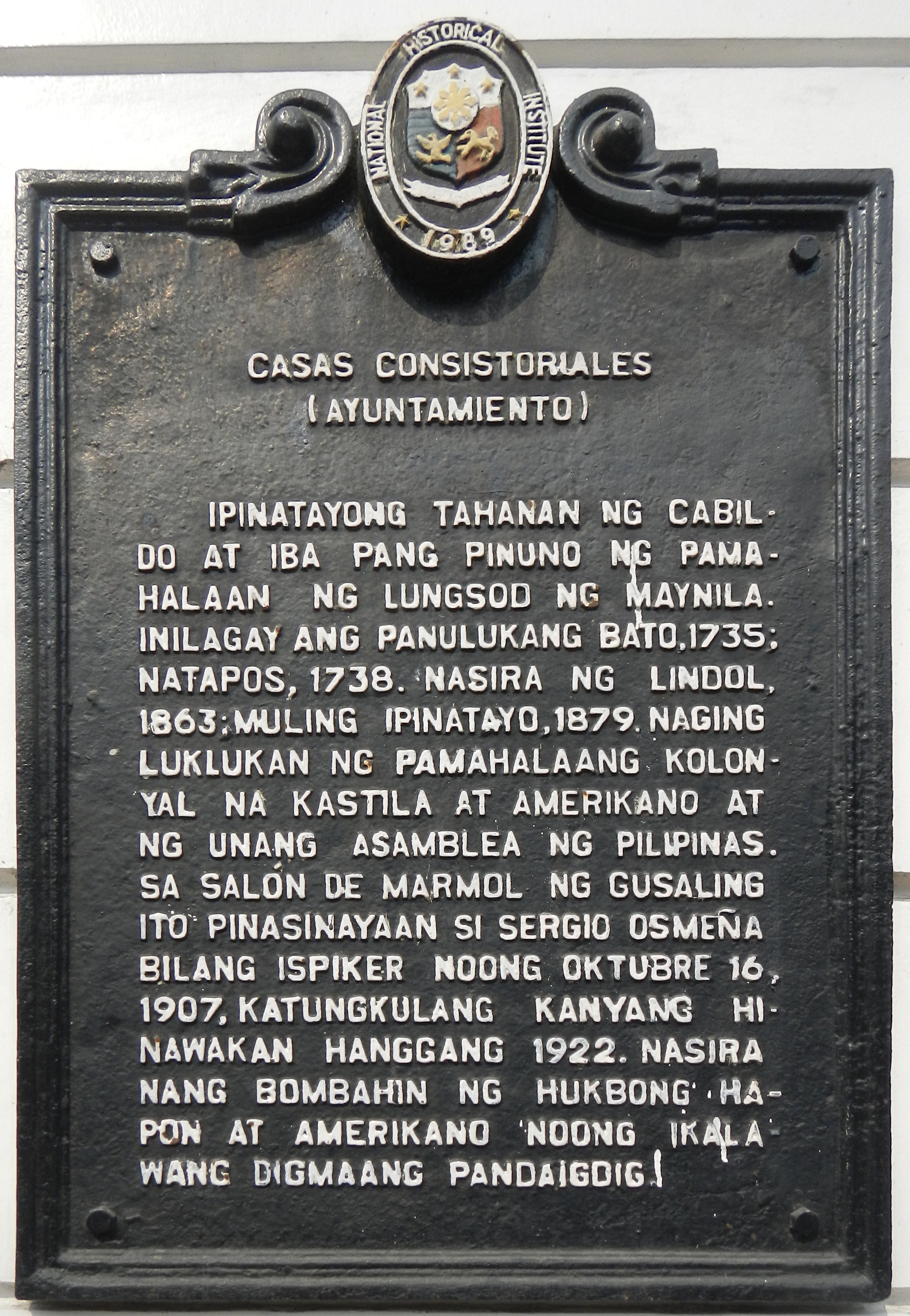
Marker installed in 1989

Construction of the Ayuntamiento began in 1599 and the original building opened in 1607. After an earthquake damaged it severely, it was ordered demolished. The Ayuntamiento was rebuilt in 1738, in the Baroque style, with ornate wrought-iron balconies, covered arcades, and a central clock tower. This form survived well into the 19th century until it was destroyed again during the 1863 Manila earthquake.

From 1879 to 1884, a new building was constructed by Eduardo López Navarro, a military engineer, and according to the designs of architect Felipe Roxas.

During the transition from the Spanish to the American rule after the Spanish–American War, General Wesley Merritt and Governor-General Fermín Jáudenes signed the terms of capitulation of Manila in the Ayuntamiento.

Until 1903, the Ayuntamiento was used as the office of the American military governor. The building was later used by the First Philippine Assembly, then by the Philippine Legislature until 1924, when it moved to the Legislative Building along Padre Burgos Street in Ermita. It was also used subsequently by the Bureau of Justice and the Supreme Court.

The Ayuntamiento was destroyed in the 1945 Battle of Manila, with only the outer walls of the first floor remaining. The ruins were subsequently repurposed as a parking lot.

In 1966, the site of the Old Ayuntamiento, which was planned to be reconstructed in the same design, was declared as the Osmeña Memorial Building in honor of the late Sergio Osmeña, fourth President of the Philippines, through Republic Act No. 4840. It also mandates that the building shall provide spaces for an archives section, display rooms, conference and seminar rooms, a library, and all other matters and activities involving the collection and study of historical materials pertaining to the life and works of the late President.

== Restoration and current use ==
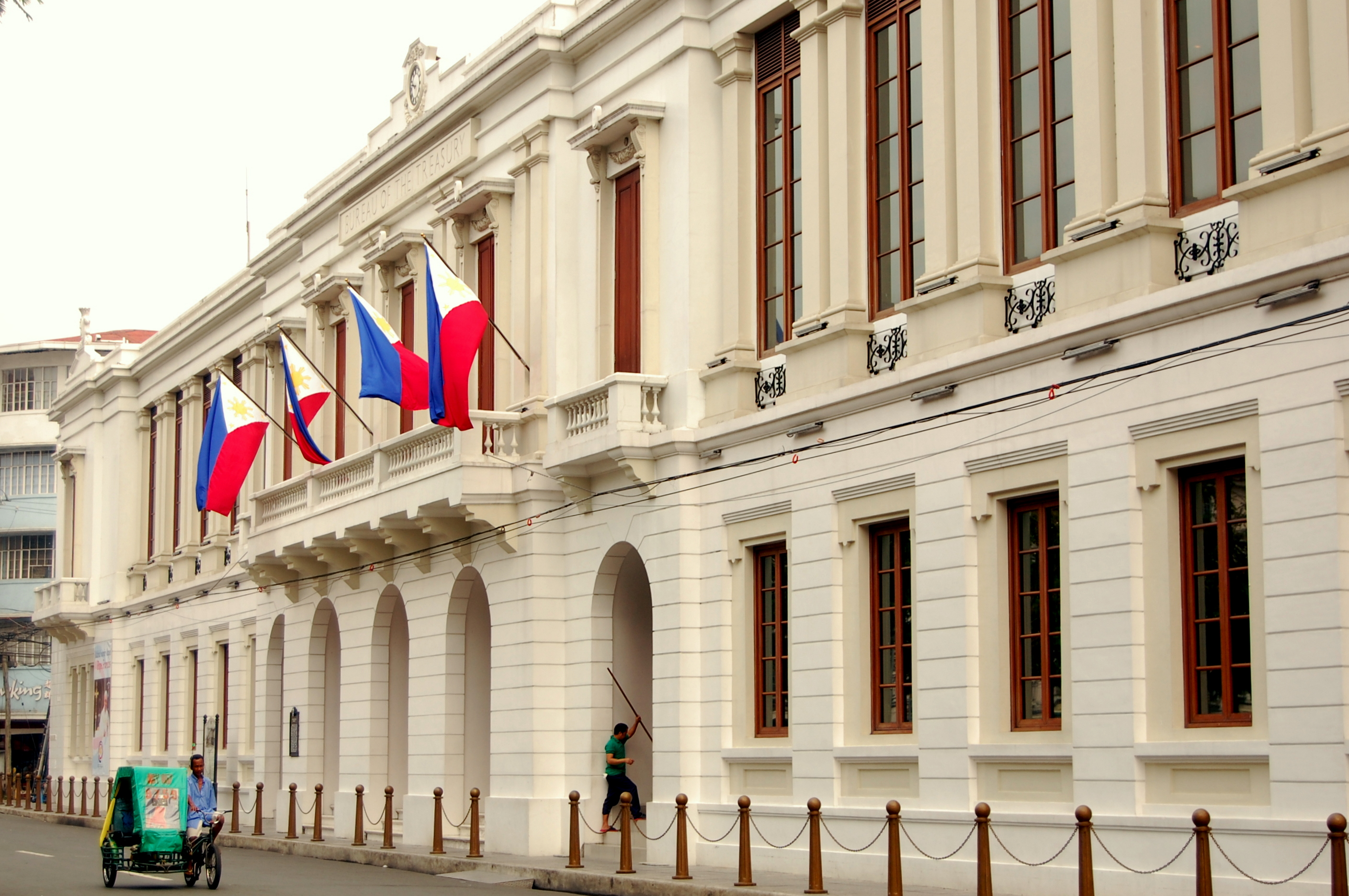
Southwestern façade of the Ayuntamiento de Manila.

Reconstruction of the Ayuntamiento began in 2009, with the building becoming the future home of the Bureau of the Treasury (BTr), which was formerly headquartered across Plaza de Roma at the Palacio del Gobernador.

Work on the ₱1.2 billion reconstruction of the Ayuntamiento was led by local contractor DDT Konstract, Inc., which sought to be as authentic as possible in reconstructing the building's interiors. Although reconstruction work was originally supposed to be completed by November 8, 2011, completion was delayed owing to several modifications being made by the Bureau to the building's design. The building was ultimately completed in 2013.

In 2015, the BTr agreed to open the Ayuntamiento to the public as a tourist attraction.

== See also ==
- Aduana Building
