= Jerome Marble House =

Historic house in Massachusetts, United States

- U.S. National Register of Historic Places
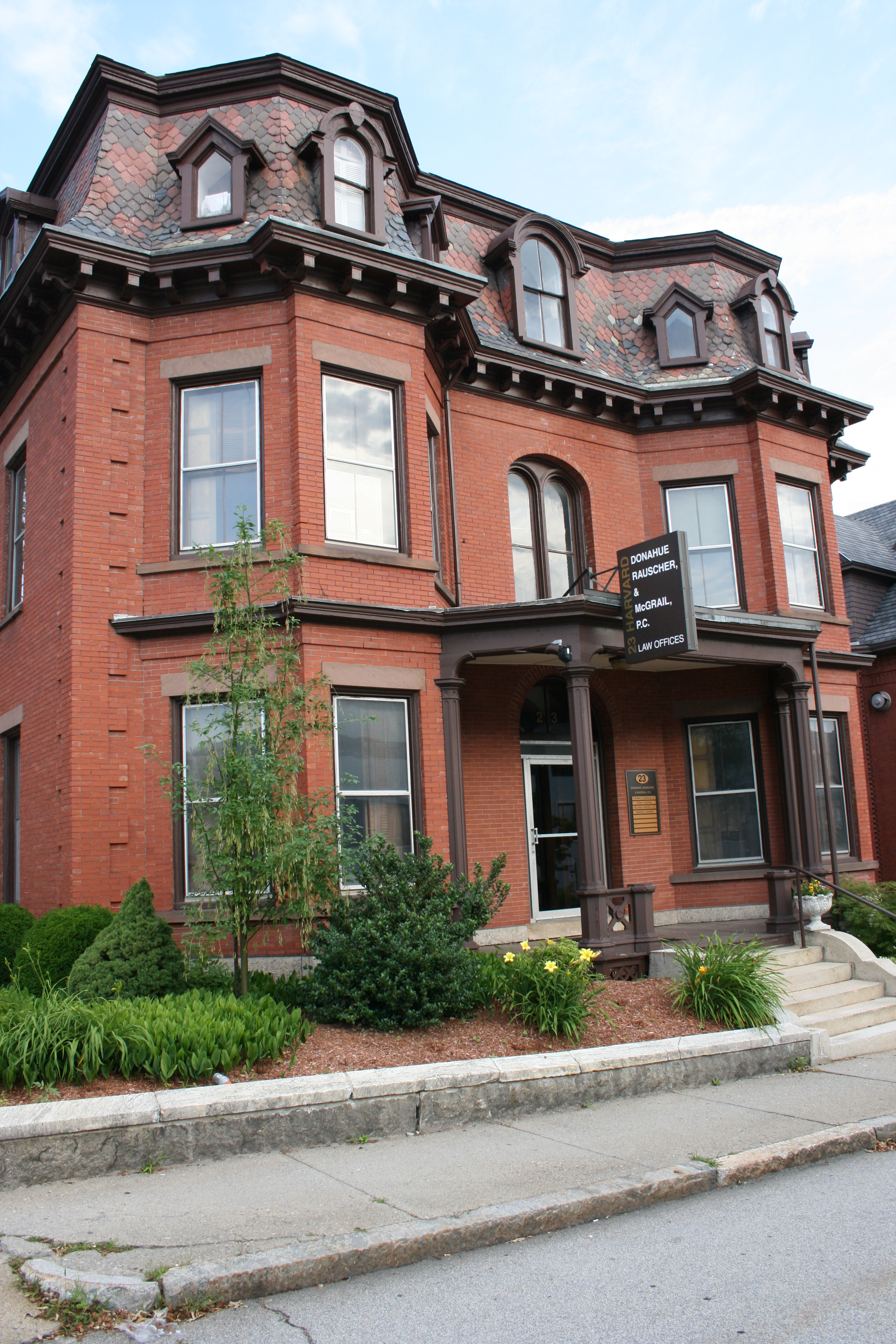

- Location within Massachusetts Location within the United States
- Location: 23 Harvard St., Worcester, Massachusetts
- Coordinates: 42°16′6″N 71°48′11″W
- Built: 1867
- Architect: E. Boyden & Son
- Architectural style: Italianate
- MPS: Worcester MRA
- NRHP reference No.: 80000567
- Added to NRHP: March 05, 1980

The Jerome Marble House is an historic house at 23 Harvard Street in Worcester, Massachusetts, United States. Built in 1867 to a design by Elbridge Boyden, it is one of the city's fine examples of Second Empire architecture, and one of the few for which an architect is known. The house was listed on the National Register of Historic Places in 1980. It now houses professional offices.

== Description and history ==
The Marble House is located on the west side of Harvard Street, a north–south road paralleling downtown Worcester's Main Street on a rise to the west. It is a 2 1/2-story brick structure, with a slate mansard roof providing a full third floor. The building's corners have brick quoining, and the main facade is symmetrical, with polygonal bays (rising to the roof level) flanking a center entrance. The entrance is sheltered by an open porch that spans the inner front corners of the flanking bays, and is topped on the second level by two narrow round-arch windows set in a single segmented-arch opening. The windows of the flanking bays are set in rectangular openings, with stone beltcourses serving as sills, and stone lintels above. The roof is studded with dormers, some with round-arch openings and windows, others with center-gable caps and pointed-arch windows.

The house was built in 1867 to a design by E. Boyden & Son, and is a little-altered example of the Second Empire style in the city. It was built for Jerome Marble, a dealer in pharmaceuticals and chemicals. Marble was also a director of the Quinsigamond Bank, and made an unsuccessful foray into establishing an excursion railroad.

== See also ==
- National Register of Historic Places listings in northwestern Worcester, Massachusetts
- National Register of Historic Places listings in Worcester County, Massachusetts
