= National Register of Historic Places listings in inner Harris County, Texas =

Location of Harris County in Texas

This is a list of the National Register of Historic Places in inner Harris County, Texas, defined as within the I-610 loop within Harris County, Texas, but excluding those places in Downtown Houston and those in Houston Heights, which are listed separately. (Downtown Houston is defined as the area enclosed by Interstate 10, Interstate 45, and Interstate 69. Houston Heights is defined, approximately, by Highway I-10 on the South, I-610 on the North, I-45 on the East and Durham on the West.)

Contents: NRHP listings by area in Harris County
downtown Houston - Houston Heights - inner Harris County - outer Harris County

This National Park Service list is complete through NPS recent listings posted September 4, 2026.

The locations of National Register properties and districts (at least for all showing latitude and longitude coordinates below) may be seen in a map by clicking on "Map of all coordinates."

== Current listings ==
	Name on the Register	Image	Date listed	Location	City or town	Description
1	1879 Houston Waterworks	1879 Houston Waterworks	May 6, 1976 (#76002037)	27 Artesian Place; 29°45′50″N 95°22′10″W	Houston	
2	Almeda Road Bridge over Brays Bayou	Almeda Road Bridge over Brays Bayou	November 29, 2007 (#07001234)	Almeda Rd. at Brays Bayou; 29°42′47″N 95°22′55″W	Houston	
3	The Astrodome	The Astrodome	January 15, 2014 (#13001099)	8400 Kirby Drive; 29°41′06″N 95°24′28″W	Houston	
4	James L. Autry House	James L. Autry House	June 14, 1979 (#79002953)	5 Courtlandt Pl. 29°44′36″N 95°22′57″W	Houston	
5	Aviary at the Houston Zoo	Aviary at the Houston Zoo	August 9, 2005 (#05000858)	1513 N. McGregor; 29°42′59″N 95°23′27″W	Houston	
6	Bayou Bend	Bayou Bend	December 6, 1979 (#79002954)	1 Westcott St. 29°45′27″N 95°25′14″W	Houston	
7	Benjamin Apartments	Benjamin Apartments	September 26, 2002 (#02001063)	1218 Webster St. 29°44′47″N 95°22′11″W	Houston	
8	Bethel Baptist Church	Bethel Baptist Church	January 16, 1998 (#97001626)	801 Andrews; 29°45′04″N 95°22′33″W	Houston	
9	Boulevard Oaks Historic District	Boulevard Oaks Historic District	February 22, 2002 (#02000117)	Roughly bounded by North Blvd., South Blvd., Hazard and Mandell Sts. 29°43′37″N 95°24′13″W	Houston	
10	Broadacres Historic District	Broadacres Historic District	April 16, 1980 (#80004128)	1300-1506 North Blvd. and 1305-1515 South Blvd. 29°43′37″N 95°23′48″W	Houston	
11	Margarett Root Brown College	Margarett Root Brown College	March 30, 2026 (#100012856)	Rice University, 6100 Main Street; 29°43′17″N 95°23′45″W	Houston	
12	Cameron Iron Works	Cameron Iron Works	February 7, 2020 (#100004967)	711 Milby St. 29°44′42″N 95°20′22″W	Houston	
13	J. J. Carroll House		June 14, 1979 (#79002955)	16 Courtlandt Pl. 29°44′38″N 95°23′04″W	Houston	
14	W. T. Carter Jr. House		June 14, 1979 (#79002956)	18 Courtlandt Pl. 29°44′38″N 95°23′05″W	Houston	
15	Cheek-Neal Coffee Company Building	Cheek-Neal Coffee Company Building	June 7, 2016 (#16000350)	2017 Preston; 29°45′22″N 95°21′07″W	Houston	
16	Clarke & Courts Building	Clarke & Courts Building	April 14, 1994 (#94000354)	1210 W. Clay Ave. 29°45′20″N 95°23′38″W	Houston	
17	William L. Clayton Summer House	William L. Clayton Summer House	February 2, 1984 (#84001756)	3376 Inwood Dr. 29°46′44″N 95°25′46″W	Houston	
18	A. S. Cleveland House		June 14, 1979 (#79002958)	8 Courtlandt Pl. 29°44′38″N 95°23′00″W	Houston	
19	Courtlandt Place Historic District	Courtlandt Place Historic District	December 3, 1980 (#80004129)	2-25 Courtlandt Pl. 29°44′37″N 95°23′03″W	Houston	
20	James A. Dawson House		March 17, 1994 (#94000248)	400 Emerson Ave. 29°44′29″N 95°23′01″W	Houston	
21	DePelchin Faith Home	DePelchin Faith Home	August 9, 1984 (#84001759)	2700 Albany St. 29°44′57″N 95°22′58″W	Houston	
22	Thomas J. Donoghue House		June 14, 1979 (#79002959)	17 Courtlandt Pl. 29°44′36″N 95°23′05″W	Houston	
23	John M. Dorrance House		June 14, 1979 (#79002960)	9 Courtlandt Pl. 29°44′36″N 95°22′59″W	Houston	
24	Charles W., Sr. and Mary Duncan House		July 24, 2017 (#100001374)	3664 Inverness Dr. 29°45′09″N 95°26′14″W	Houston	
25	Eldorado Ballroom		February 1, 2022 (#100007402)	2310 Elgin St. 29°44′05″N 95°21′55″W	Houston	
26	Ned A. and Linda S. Eppes House	Ned A. and Linda S. Eppes House	December 30, 1997 (#97001599)	5322 Institute Ln. 29°43′29″N 95°23′50″W	Houston	
27	Farnsworth & Chambers Building	Farnsworth & Chambers Building	October 29, 2009 (#09000866)	2999 S. Wayside; 29°42′22″N 95°19′06″W	Houston	
28	Roy and Margaret Farrar House		October 4, 2006 (#06000923)	511 Lovett Blvd. 29°44′35″N 95°23′16″W	Houston	
29	Fire Engine House No. 9		October 17, 1985 (#85003238)	1810-1812 Keene St. 29°46′31″N 95°21′05″W	Houston	Demolished
30	First Evangelical Church	First Evangelical Church	November 21, 2006 (#06001066)	1311 Holman St. 29°44′25″N 95°22′32″W	Houston	
31	Maria Boswell Flake Home for Old Women	Maria Boswell Flake Home for Old Women	May 11, 2018 (#100002435)	1130 Berry St. 29°44′19″N 95°22′40″W	Houston	
32	J. A. Folger and Company Plant		April 26, 2021 (#100006493)	235 North Norwood St. 29°44′48″N 95°18′56″W	Houston	
33	Forum of Civics	Forum of Civics	October 13, 1988 (#88001053)	2503 Westheimer Rd. 29°44′30″N 95°25′04″W	Houston	
34	Freedmen's Town Historic District	Freedmen's Town Historic District	January 17, 1985 (#85000186)	Roughly Bounded by Genesse, West Dallas, Arthur and W. Gray Sts. 29°45′19″N 95°22′49″W	Houston	
35	Heights State Bank Building	Heights State Bank Building	June 22, 1983 (#83004439)	3620 Washington St. 29°46′11″N 95°23′48″W	Houston	
36	Hermann Park Municipal Golf Clubhouse	Hermann Park Municipal Golf Clubhouse	February 7, 2020 (#100004968)	6201 Hermann Park Dr. 29°42′51″N 95°23′20″W	Houston	
37	Fred J. Heyne House	Fred J. Heyne House	March 25, 1994 (#94000266)	220 Westmoreland Ave. 29°44′25″N 95°23′04″W	Houston	
38	Hill Street Bridge over Buffalo Bayou	Hill Street Bridge over Buffalo Bayou	October 31, 2007 (#07001131)	S. Jensen Dr. at Buffalo Bayou; 29°45′40″N 95°20′36″W	Houston	
39	Hollyfield Laundry and Cleaners		February 28, 2017 (#100006770)	1731 Westheimer Rd. 29°44′34″N 95°24′13″W	Houston	
40	Houston Fire Station No. 3	Houston Fire Station No. 3	February 28, 2017 (#100000696)	1919 Houston Ave. 29°46′30″N 95°22′22″W	Houston	
41	Houston Fire Station No. 7	Houston Fire Station No. 7	April 17, 1986 (#86000798)	2403 Milam St. 29°44′51″N 95°22′29″W	Houston	
42	Houston Light Guard Armory	Houston Light Guard Armory	January 4, 2024 (#100009738)	3820 Caroline Street; 29°44′09″N 95°22′40″W	Houston	Home to the Buffalo Soldiers National Museum.
43	Houston Negro Hospital	Houston Negro Hospital	December 27, 1982 (#82004856)	3204 Ennis St. 29°43′52″N 95°21′37″W	Houston	
44	Houston Negro Hospital School of Nursing Building	Houston Negro Hospital School of Nursing Building	December 27, 1982 (#82004857)	Holman Ave. and Ennis St. 29°43′34″N 95°21′26″W	Houston	
45	Houston Post		April 2, 2018 (#100002269)	2410 Polk St. 29°44′50″N 95°21′16″W	Houston	
46	Idylwood Historic District		July 6, 2011 (#11000425)	Roughly bounded by Lawndale Ave., N. MacGregor Way, Sylvan Rd. & Wayside Dr. 29°43′15″N 95°18′36″W	Houston	
47	Inwood Manor		March 30, 2026 (#100012863)	3711 San Felipe Street; 29°44′49″N 95°26′14″W	Houston	
48	Isabella Court	Isabella Court	June 24, 1994 (#94000628)	3909-3917 S. Main St. 29°44′11″N 95°22′50″W	Houston	
49	Jefferson Davis Hospital	Jefferson Davis Hospital	August 10, 2005 (#05000859)	1101 Elder; 29°46′10″N 95°22′07″W	Houston	
50	Morris and Mary Johnson House		June 4, 1997 (#97000541)	3818 Spencer St. 29°46′30″N 95°23′58″W	Houston	Demolished
51	Jones-Hunt House		June 14, 1979 (#79002962)	24 Courtlandt Pl. 29°44′38″N 95°23′09″W	Houston	
52	Knapp Building (1940)		August 6, 2024 (#100010652)	1230 Houston Avenue; 29°46′12″N 95°22′20″W	Houston	
53	Lewis Apartment Building	Lewis Apartment Building	May 24, 1996 (#96000587)	2815-2817 Smith St. 29°44′43″N 95°22′44″W	Houston	
54	Ewart H. and Lillian Lightfoot House		February 2, 2024 (#100009922)	3702 Audubon Place; 29°44′23″N 95°23′12″W	Houston	
55	Link-Lee House	Link-Lee House	September 11, 2000 (#00000751)	3800 Montrose; 29°44′16″N 95°23′29″W	Houston	
56	Logue House	Logue House	April 30, 1998 (#98000428)	1101 Milford; 29°43′44″N 95°23′31″W	Houston	
57	Leonard W. Macatee House	Leonard W. Macatee House	May 6, 2005 (#05000387)	1220 Southmore Blvd. 29°43′37″N 95°23′07″W	Houston	
58	Marguerite Meachum & John S. Mellinger House		June 20, 2012 (#12000351)	3452 Del Monte Drive; 29°45′04″N 95°25′58″W	Houston	
59	Mechanical Laboratory and Power House	Mechanical Laboratory and Power House	January 14, 2021 (#100006045)	6100 Main St. (Rice University); 29°42′56″N 95°23′52″W	Houston	
60	Medical Towers	Medical Towers	December 27, 2016 (#16000918)	1709 Dryden Rd. 29°42′35″N 95°24′05″W	Houston	
61	James V. Meek House	James V. Meek House	March 17, 1994 (#94000247)	3704 Garrott Ave. 29°44′22″N 95°23′08″W	Houston	
62	Ezekial and Mary Jane Miller House	Ezekial and Mary Jane Miller House	October 6, 1983 (#83003788)	304 Hawthorne St. 29°44′36″N 95°23′02″W	Houston	
63	Simon and Mamie Minchen House	Simon and Mamie Minchen House	December 7, 2000 (#00001496)	1753 North Blvd. 29°43′45″N 95°24′15″W	Houston	
64	Angelo and Lillian Minella House	Angelo and Lillian Minella House	September 13, 2006 (#06000818)	6328 Brookside Dr. 29°43′52″N 95°18′59″W	Houston	
65	Moncrief-Lenoir Manufacturing Company		November 15, 2023 (#100009405)	2103 Lyons Ave. 29°46′18″N 95°20′52″W	Houston	
66	Sterling Myer House		June 14, 1979 (#79002964)	4 Courtlandt Pl. 29°44′37″N 95°22′55″W	Houston	
67	Myers-Spalti Manufacturing Plant	Myers-Spalti Manufacturing Plant	September 12, 2003 (#03000936)	2115 Runnels St. 29°45′45″N 95°20′49″W	Houston	
68	William R. Nash House	William R. Nash House	August 23, 1990 (#90001293)	215 Westmoreland Ave. 29°44′27″N 95°23′04″W	Houston	
69	Near North Side Historic District		November 29, 2010 (#10000960)	Roughly bounded by Little White Oak Bayou on the N; Hogan on the S; I-45 on the W and the block between N Main and Keene; 29°46′42″N 95°21′55″W	Houston	
70	C. L. Neuhaus House		June 14, 1979 (#79002965)	6 Courtlandt Pl. 29°44′38″N 95°22′58″W	Houston	
71	Hugo V. Neuhaus Jr. House		March 30, 2005 (#05000246)	2910 Lazy Ln. 29°45′23″N 95°25′01″W	Houston	
72	Old Sixth Ward Historic District	Old Sixth Ward Historic District	January 23, 1978 (#78002946)	Bounded by Washington, Union, Houston, Capitol and Glenwood Cemetery; 29°45′57″N 95°22′38″W	Houston	
73	Olivewood Cemetery	Olivewood Cemetery	August 6, 2026 (#100013306)	1300 Court Street; 29°46′26″N 95°23′31″W	Houston	
74	The Orange Show	The Orange Show	November 21, 2006 (#06001063)	2401 Munger St. 29°43′10″N 95°19′28″W	Houston	
75	Edward Albert Palmer Memorial Chapel and Autry House	Edward Albert Palmer Memorial Chapel and Autry House	October 31, 1984 (#84000388)	6221 and 6265 Main St. 29°42′57″N 95°23′47″W	Houston	
76	John W. Parker House		June 14, 1979 (#79002966)	2 Courtlandt Pl. 29°44′38″N 95°22′55″W	Houston	
77	D. D. Peden House		July 16, 1991 (#91000889)	2 Longfellow Ln. 29°43′21″N 95°23′35″W	Houston	
78	River Oaks Theatre	River Oaks Theatre	October 25, 2024 (#100010951)	2050 West Gray Street; 29°45′10″N 95°24′33″W	Houston	
79	Rothko Chapel	Rothko Chapel	August 16, 2000 (#00000883)	1409 Sul Ross Ave. 29°44′15″N 95°23′46″W	Houston	
80	Sabine Street Bridge over Buffalo Bayou	Sabine Street Bridge over Buffalo Bayou	September 28, 2007 (#07001023)	Sabine St. at Buffalo Bayou; 29°45′45″N 95°22′31″W	Houston	
81	St. Elizabeth's Hospital	St. Elizabeth's Hospital	March 6, 2019 (#100003489)	4514 Lyons Ave. 29°46′33″N 95°19′28″W	Houston	
82	St. Paul's Methodist Episcopal Church	St. Paul's Methodist Episcopal Church	September 12, 2019 (#100004373)	5501 Main St. 29°43′33″N 95°23′19″W	Houston	
83	San Felipe Courts Historic District	San Felipe Courts Historic District	February 16, 1988 (#88000042)	1 Allen Pkwy. Village; 29°45′34″N 95°22′42″W	Houston	
84	San Jacinto Senior High School	San Jacinto Senior High School	December 5, 2012 (#12001000)	Houston Community College Central; 1300 Holman St. 29°44′15″N 95°22′36″W	Houston	Consists of three contributing buildings
85	San Jacinto Warehouse		March 13, 2025 (#100011510)	1101-1125 Providence Street; 29°46′06″N 95°21′23″W	Houston	
86	Schlumberger Well Surveying Corporation Building	Schlumberger Well Surveying Corporation Building	June 24, 2018 (#10002601)	2720 Leeland Street; 29°44′35″N 95°21′12″W	Houston	
87	Sears, Roebuck and Company Warehouse and Service Center	Sears, Roebuck and Company Warehouse and Service Center	June 25, 2020 (#100005314)	5901 Griggs Rd. 29°41′56″N 95°19′31″W	Houston	
88	Sessums-James House		November 19, 1998 (#98001344)	3802 Spencer; 29°46′30″N 95°23′57″W	Houston	Demolished
89	Cleveland Harding Sewall House	Cleveland Harding Sewall House	April 14, 1975 (#75001991)	3452 Inwood St. 29°45′07″N 95°25′48″W	Houston	
90	Sheridan Apartments	Sheridan Apartments	August 2, 1984 (#84001825)	802-804 McGowen St. 29°44′45″N 95°22′32″W	Houston	
91	Sills Building		March 5, 2024 (#100010026)	5804 Canal Street; 29°44′40″N 95°18′57″W	Houston	
92	Star Engraving Company Building	Star Engraving Company Building	January 6, 1995 (#94001521)	3201 Allen Pkwy. 29°45′36″N 95°23′19″W	Houston	
93	Sterling-Berry House		July 14, 1983 (#83004479)	4515 Yoakum Blvd. 29°43′56″N 95°23′32″W	Houston	
94	Joseph R. and Mary M. Stevenson House	Joseph R. and Mary M. Stevenson House	March 21, 1996 (#96000275)	804 Harold St. 29°44′28″N 95°23′20″W	Houston	
95	Style in Steel Townhouses		September 8, 2026 (#100013418)	4156, 4158, and 4160 Meyerwood Drive; 29°40′51″N 95°26′41″W	Houston	
96	Judson L. Taylor House		June 14, 1979 (#79002968)	20 Courtlandt Pl. 29°44′38″N 95°23′06″W	Houston	Colonial Revival house designed by Birdsall Briscoe
97	Telephone Road Bridge over Brays Bayou	Telephone Road Bridge over Brays Bayou	November 29, 2007 (#07001235)	Telephone Rd. at Brays Bayou; 29°42′37″N 95°18′48″W	Houston	
98	Temple Beth Israel	Temple Beth Israel	March 1, 1984 (#84001826)	3517 Austin St. 29°44′12″N 95°22′30″W	Houston	
99	Lucie Wray and Anderson Todd House		August 31, 2018 (#100002842)	9 Shadowlawn Cir. 29°43′28″N 95°23′42″W	Houston	
100	Trinity Church	Trinity Church	May 26, 1983 (#83004481)	3404 S. Main St. 29°44′22″N 95°22′39″W	Houston	
101	Union Transfer and Storage Building	Union Transfer and Storage Building	January 16, 2001 (#00001665)	1113 Vine St. 29°46′12″N 95°21′25″W	Houston	
102	W-K-M Company, Inc. Historic District		June 25, 2018 (#100002602)	Roughly bounded by Commerce, Sampson, Preston & Velasco Streets; 29°45′03″N 95°20′27″W	Houston	
103	West Eleventh Place Historic District	West Eleventh Place Historic District	April 14, 1997 (#97000317)	1-8 W. 11th Pl. 29°43′31″N 95°23′31″W	Houston	
104	Westmoreland Historic District	Westmoreland Historic District	August 16, 1994 (#94000859)	Bounded by Hawthorne, Burlington and Marshall Aves., and Garott St. 29°44′26″N 95°23′00″W	Houston	
105	Andrew Jackson and Margaret Cullinan Wray House	Andrew Jackson and Margaret Cullinan Wray House	August 19, 1993 (#93000844)	3 Remington Ln. 29°43′25″N 95°23′35″W	Houston	

== Former listings ==
	Name on the Register	Image	Date listed	Date removed	Location	City or town	Description
1	Houston Turn-Verein		March 21, 1978 (#78002944)	July 24, 2017	5202 Almeda Rd. 29°43′23″N 95°22′44″W	Houston	Demolished in 1993
2	Allen Paul House		September 27, 1980 (#80004127)	June 8, 1998	2201 Fannin St. 29°44′51″N 95°22′16″W	Houston	Also known as the Witch's Hat House. Demolished 1997

== See also ==
- List of National Historic Landmarks in Texas
- National Register of Historic Places listings in Texas
- Recorded Texas Historic Landmarks in Harris County
