= Fire Station No. 9 =

Fire Station No. 9, or variations such as Engine House No. 9, may refer to:

(ordered by U.S. state then city)

- Fire Station No. 9 (Terre Haute, Indiana)
- Fire Station No. 9 (Kansas City, Kansas)
- Fire Engine House No. 9, Houston, Texas
- Engine House No. 9 (Tacoma, Washington)

== See also ==
- List of fire stations
