= List of African-American historic places in Texas =

This list of African American Historic Places in Texas is based on a book by the National Park Service, The Preservation Press, the National Trust for Historic Preservation, and the National Conference of State Historic Preservation Officers.

Contents: Counties in Texas with African American Historic Places
Bastrop - Bell - Bexar - Brazos - Dallas - DeWitt - Ellis - Houston - Hudspeth - Limestone - Nacogdoches - Terrell - Tom Green - Travis - Victoria - Williamson

Some of these sites are on the National Register of Historic Places (NR) as independent sites or as part of larger historic district. Several of the sites are National Historic Landmarks (NRL). Others have Texas historical markers (HM). The citation on historical markers is given in the reference. The location listed is the nearest community to the site. More precise locations are given in the reference.

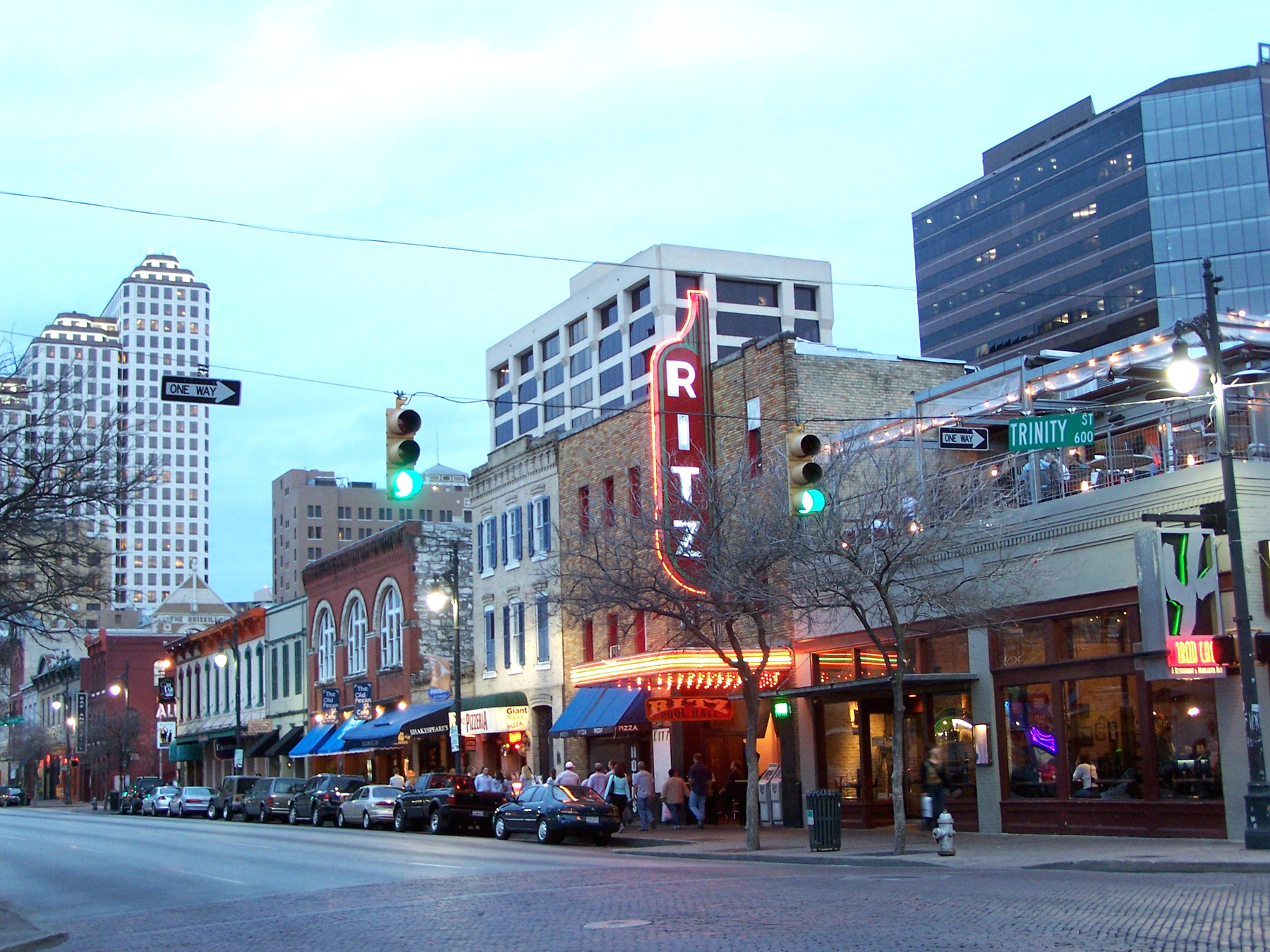
Sixth Street Historic District, Austin, Texas

== Bastrop County ==
- Bastrop
  - Jennie Brooks House
  - Kerr Community Center
  - Beverly and Lula Kerr House
  - Kohler-McPhaul House
  - Harriet and Charlie McNeil House
  - Ploeger-Kerr-White House (HM)

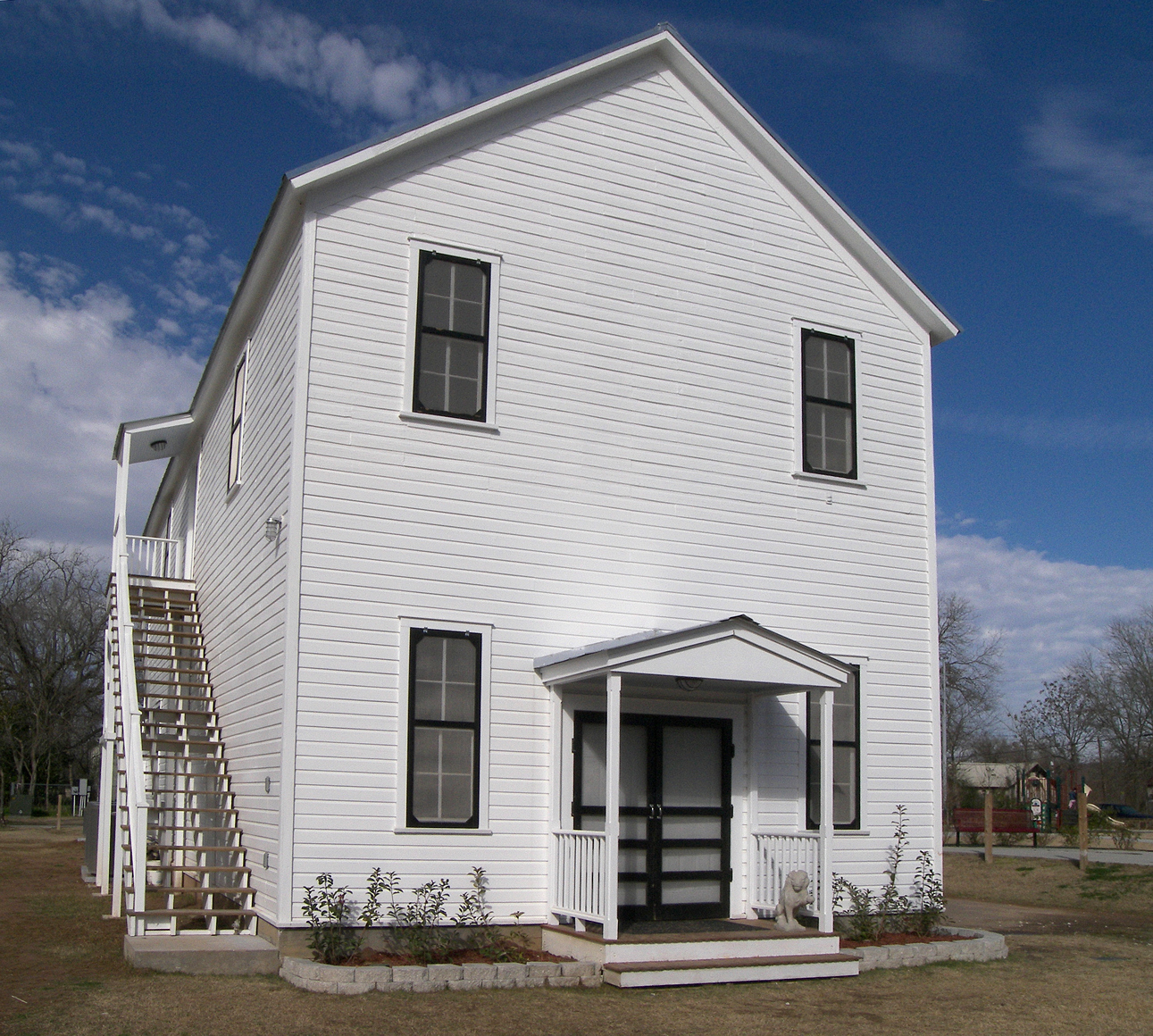
Kerr Community Center

== Bell County ==
- Texas
  - Mount Zion United Methodist Church (NR)

== Bexar County ==
- San Antonio
  - Ellis Alley
    - Mount Zion First Baptist Church

== Brazos County ==
- Bryan
  - E.A. Kemp House (HM)

== Dallas County ==
- Dallas
  - Tenth Street Historic District (NR)
  - Wheatley Place Historic District (NR)

== DeWitt County ==
- Cuero
  - E.A. Daule House, Cuero
  - Macedonia Baptist Church (HM)

== Ellis County ==
- Waxahachie
  - Building at 441 East Main,
  - Building at 500-502 East Main
  - Joshua Chapel A.M.E. Church

== Harris County ==
- Houston
  - Antioch Missionary Baptist Church
  - Freedmen's Town historic District
  - Houston Negro Hospital School of Nursing Building
  - Houston Negro Hospital (NR)

== Houston County ==
- Crockett
  - Mary Allen Seminary for Colored Girls, Administration Building (HM)

== Hudspeth County ==
- Sierra Blanca
  - Archeological Site No. 41 HZ 227 Possible military encampment for the 10th Cavalry Buffalo Soldiers.
  - Archeological Site No. 41 HZ 228 Possible military cemetery for the 10th Cavalry Buffalo Soldiers.
  - Archeological Site No. 41 HZ 439 Possible military encampment for the 10th Cavalry

== Limestone County ==
- Texas
  - Booker T. Washington Emancipation Proclamation Park (HM)

== Nacogdoches County ==
- Nacogdoches
  - Zion Hill Historic District (NR)

== Newton County, Texas ==
- Shankleville
  - Addie L. and A.T. Odom Homestead

== Terrell County ==
- Dryden
  - Bullis' Camp Site Possible encampment of Lt. Bullis’ Black-Seminole Indiana scouts.(NR)

== Tom Green County ==
- San Angelo
  - Greater St. Paul AME Church (NR/HM)

== Travis County ==
- Austin
  - Clarksville Historic District
  - Evans Industrial Building
  - McKinney Homestead,
  - Sixth Street Historic District, (NR)

== Victoria County ==
- Victoria
  - Townsend-Wilkins House
  - Victoria Colored School
  - Webster Chapel United Methodist Church (NR/NRL)

== Williamson County ==
- Georgetown
  - Wesley Chapel A.M.E Church (HM)
