= The Book of Maggie =

The Book of Maggie is a dark comedy play by Houston playwright, Brendan Bourque-Sheil. Its world premier took place at Stages Repertory Theatre in Houston, Texas on January 20, 2016. The play was subsequently produced by Death and Pretzels at Nox Arca Theatre in Chicago, Illinois.

== Synopsis ==
Maggie is a suicidal young woman who has traveled to a lonely beach with the intent to commit suicide. She's astonished when she is visited by both Judas Iscariot and Pontius Pilate (Seán Patrick Judge). Both men have their own reasons for appearing - Judas because Saint Peter promised him entrance to Heaven. Pilate was sent as well, but was given no similar promise of redemption. As the night progresses the trio is visited by Joan, who washes up on the beach.

== Reception ==
The Houston Press was mixed in their opinion, writing "Impressively smart and funny in places, the play feels over-boiled and unnecessarily populated with ideas in others" but also stating that it was "impressive for such a novice playwright". The Houston Chronicle was also mixed, stating "Stages deserves credit for taking the risk of a world premiere, and "The Book of Maggie" is not without its pluses and some potentially interesting ground to cover. It just needs a more purposeful roadmap for its irreverent tour of the afterlife." In contrast, BroadwayWorld.com was wholly positive and called the play a "real treat".
