= Stages Repertory Theatre =

Theatre company in Houston, Texas

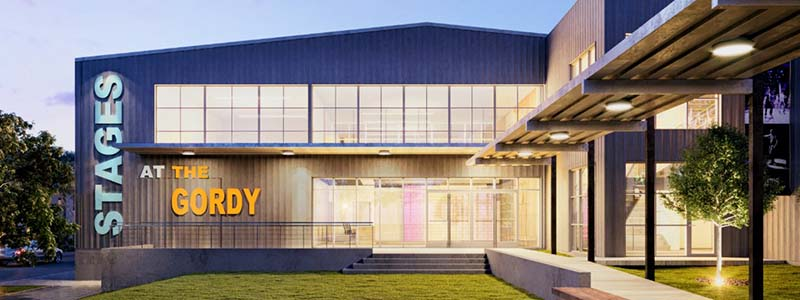
Stages at The Gordy

Stages (Houston) is a theatre company in the city of Houston, Texas formerly known as Stages Repertory Theatre. It produces performances at The Gordy, the company's three-stage venue that opened in 2020 in Houston's Montrose neighborhood. The Houston Chronicle called it "the equivalent of off-Broadway in Houston".

== History ==
Stages was founded in 1978 by Founding Artistic Director Ted Swindley in the basement of a downtown Houston to "produce new work, interpret established work in new ways, and nurture talent to invigorate culture for the good of the community." In 1985, Stages moved to the former Star Engraving building at 3201 Allen Parkway, which was designated a local historic landmark in 1986.

== Stages today ==
Stages is a professional Equity theater and has received coverage in The New York Times, The Wall Street Journal, Variety, Vogue and American Theatre magazine.

In addition, Stages introduces young audiences to live theater through its EarlyStages series. Each year, thousands of local children experience dramatic interpretations of classic folktales, stories from diverse world cultures, along with plays and musicals commissioned especially for EarlyStages.

Its current Artistic Director is Derek Charles Livingston. Formerly this position was held by Kenn McLaughlin.
