= Children's Museum of Houston =

Children's Museum Houston

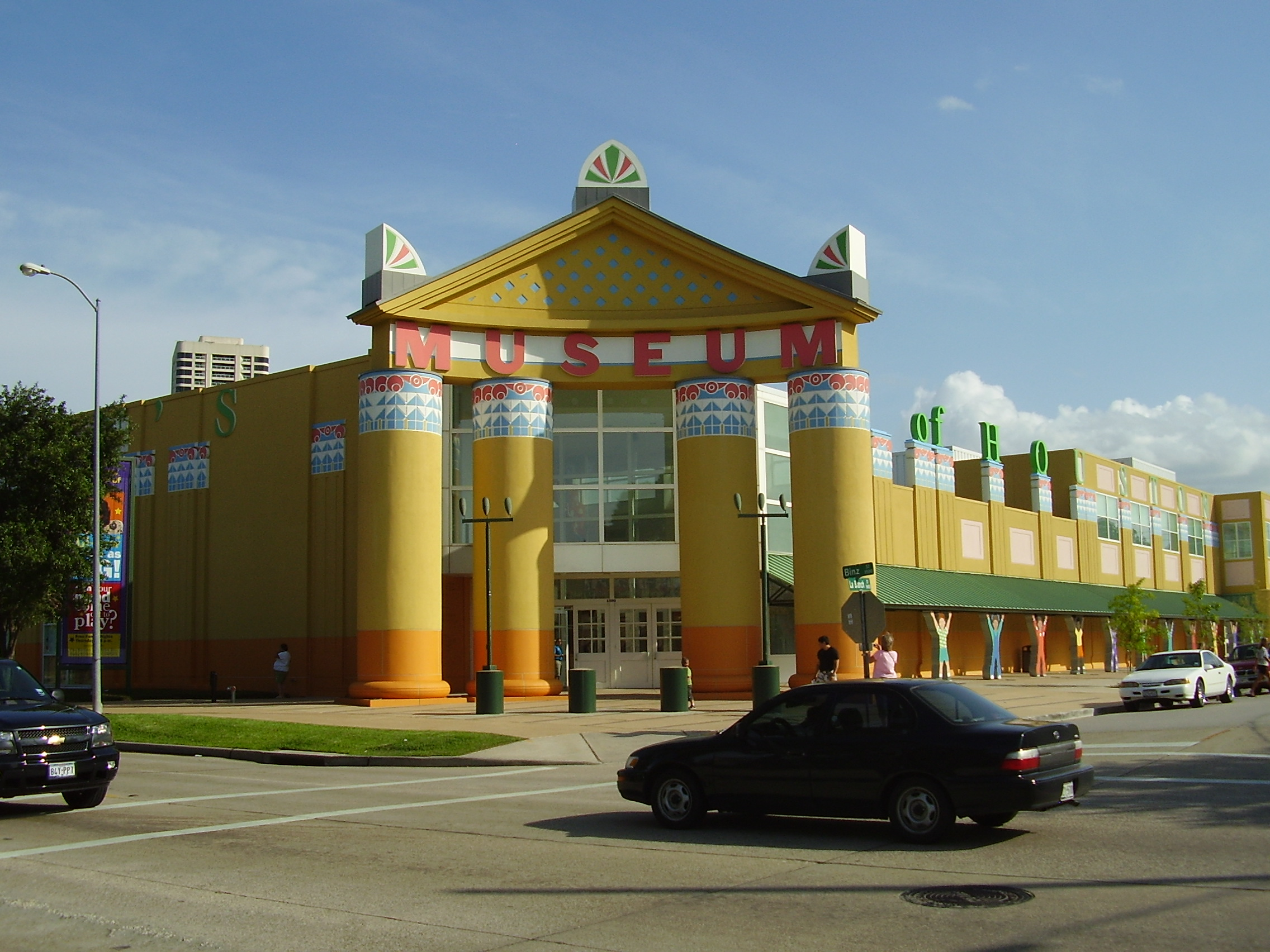
- Established: 1980
- Location: Houston, Texas
- Coordinates: 29°43′21.7″N 95°23′06.1″W
- Type: Children's museum
- Public transit access: Red Line Museum District
- Website: www.cmhouston.org

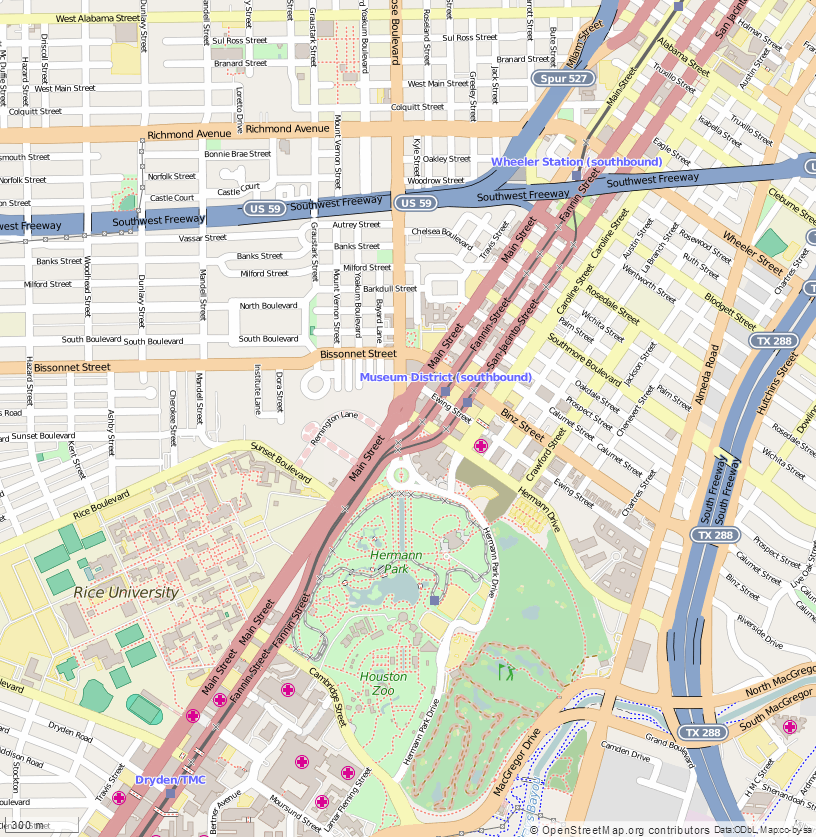
Location within Houston Museum District

Children's Museum Houston (CMH) is a nonprofit children's museum in the Museum District of Houston, Texas. Founded in 1980 and designed by Denise Scott Brown and Robert Venturi, it offers exhibits and bilingual learning programs for children aged 0–12. It is one of 190 children's museums in the United States and 15 children's museums in Texas.

== History ==
CMH was founded in 1980 by Sharon Albert Brier who was inspired by a visit to the Denver Children's Museum with her eight-year old son, Samson. She incorporated the museum as a nonprofit and after researching other children's museums and created the first board of directors. It opened in 1984, originally leasing space from the Blaffer Gallery of the University of Houston; it moved several years later to 11,000 square feet (1,000 m^{2}) of leased space in the former Star Engraving Company Building on Allen Parkway. https://www.cmhouston.org/museum-history Its current facility, located at 1500 Binz in Houston's Museum District, opened in November 1992, and features 44,000 square feet (4,100 m^{2}) of space. It was designed to accommodate 350,000 annual visitors. The building was designed by Denise Scott Brown and Robert Venturi (in association with Jackson and Ryan Architects), who designed the space to evoke both institutional monumentality "typical of the adult world" as well as playfulness befitting an institution primarily serving children. By 1997, CMH received 700,000 annual visitors. Executive director Tammie Kahn said in 2009 that by the year 1997, it was, as paraphrased by Jennifer Leahy of the Houston Chronicle "apparent that the popular place needed more space." The museum began plans to move to a new location in the late 1990s.

After 1992, CMH's administrative and support offices were located on the facility's second floor. These administrative and support offices moved in 2009 to a 17,000-square-foot (1,600 m^{2}) newly constructed facility at the intersection of Binz and Crawford, 1.5 city blocks from the museum facility. The outreach program Institute for Family Learning now occupies the second floor.

== Expansion ==
In 2009, the museum completed its expansion, doubling its size to a total of 83,000 square feet (7,700 m^{2}). This increased the museum's bilingual, community-based educational outreach programs and provided new classrooms and lab spaces through the museum's Institute for Family Learning. It also doubled the size of the museum's on-site Houston Public Library branch. The new building addition joins the original building and houses seven additional exhibit galleries. The expansion was funded by a capital campaign that raised over $35.5 million.

Across the street from the main facility is the E. Rudge Allen Jr. Family Education Annex. Designed by Jackson & Ryan, it was also completed in 2009.

== Attendance ==
CMH serves more than 1 million people annually; its outreach programs annually serve an additional 250,000 people. In 2009, executive director Tammie Kahn said that social service agencies and outreach programs serving schools together provide tickets serving over 30 percent of the museum's visitors.

== Awards ==
MSN.com awarded CMH first place in a 2005 ranking of children's museums. In 2001, Child Magazine ranked the museum in second place, after the Children's Museum of Indianapolis, in consideration of the availability of staff, diversity of exhibits, and overall experience.

Parents magazine rated it as "America's No. 1 Children's Museum." Nickelodeon Parent's Picks named it the "Best Museum in Houston 2009 & 2010." KPRC-TV (Click2Houston) called it the "Best Museum 2010." Forbes magazine ranked it as a top children's museum.

Other awards include: TripSaavy's 2018 Editor's Choice Award "Best Family Attraction and Experience," AAA 2018 Editor's "Best Of Things To Do," listed among Forbes, LA Times, and USA Today's "Best Children's Museums in the U.S.," TripAdvisor's Certificate of Excellence "Hall of Fame," Kids Out and About "Top 20 Places to Take Kids in Houston," The Culture Trip's "Top Museum and Landmark to Visit in Houston" and one of "Houston's Must-See Museums" by Travel Channel. The Museum was awarded the National Medal for Museum and Library Service in 2024 by the Institute of Museum and Library Services.
