= Carlos B. Schoeppl =

American architect

Carlos B. Schoeppl (1898–1990) was an American architect who practiced in Houston and Jacksonville, Florida, but he spent most of his career working in the Miami area. He received his training in Paris and London.

== Early life ==
Carlos Schoeppl was born in Comfort, Texas in 1898. He was a first generation American. His father was Austrian; his mother was German. He studied architecture in Paris at the Beaux Arts Academy and in London at the Royal Academy, which influenced his preference for the Classical Revival style.

== Career ==
In 1922, Schoeppl began private practice in Houston. He was the architect for the Fred J. Heyne House, which is listed on the National Register of Historic Places, and the Johnelle Bryan House (aka Bryan–Chapman House), which is recognized with a Texas Historical Marker. During the 1920s Florida Land Boom he did much work in St. Augustine, for August Heckscher, who developed Vilano Beach and D. P. Davis, who developed Davis Shores. He moved to Jacksonville, Florida in 1926. In 1933, he relocated to Miami Beach, where he designed many homes for wealthy clients along the Gold Coast.

== Works ==
A list of works by Schoeppl in chronological order:

Name	City	Address	Year	NRHP-listed?	Status	Type of Work	Notes
Fred J. Heyne House	Houston	220 Westmoreland Avenue	1924	yes			Westmoreland, Houston
Johnelle Bryan House	Houston	15 Courtlandt Place	1925				Courtlandt Place, Houston, similar to Heyne House
	Jacksonville, FL	3418 RIVERSIDE AVENUE	1926				
Echo Hotel	Edinburg, Texas	1903 S. Closner Blvd	1959				
