= Townsend-Wilkins House =

Historic residence in Victoria, Texas

- U.S. National Register of Historic Places
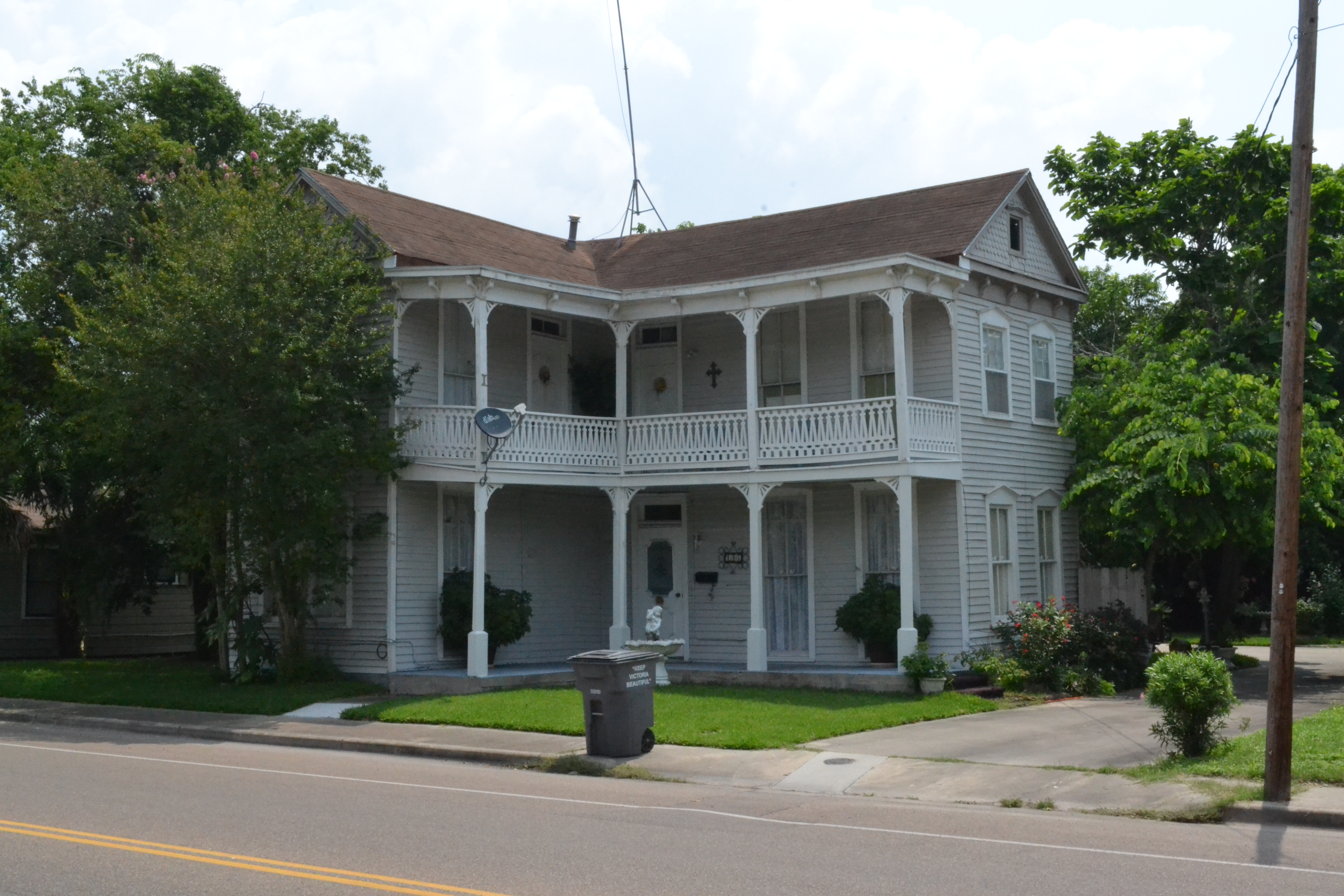
- Townsend-Wilkins House in 2006
- Location: Victoria, Texas
- Built: c. 1880
- NRHP reference No.: 86002605
- Added to NRHP: 1986

The Townsend-Wilkins House is a historic residence located in Victoria, Texas. It was home to physician G. R. Townsend, who practiced medicine in Texas and was prominent within the Black community before relocating to Los Angeles, California. The home is listed on the National Register of Historic Places and is located at 106 North Navarro. It was listed in 1986.

The home is a two-story, L-shaped folk Victorian constructed in the 1880s. Townsend established his office at 108 West Santa Rosa in the late 1880s.

Townsend relocated to Los Angeles in 1904, after which Dr. John H. Wilkins, one of the founders of the Lone Star Medical Association, acquired ownership of the house and medical practice. George Wilkins, Townsend's son, eventually took over the practice.

By 1986, the property was owned by real estate agent Lee Swearingen. The home stands among several historic residences in Victoria.

== See also ==
- National Register of Historic Places listings in Victoria County, Texas
- List of African-American historic places in Texas
