= Union Transfer and Storage Building =

It is a United States historic place

- U.S. National Register of Historic Places
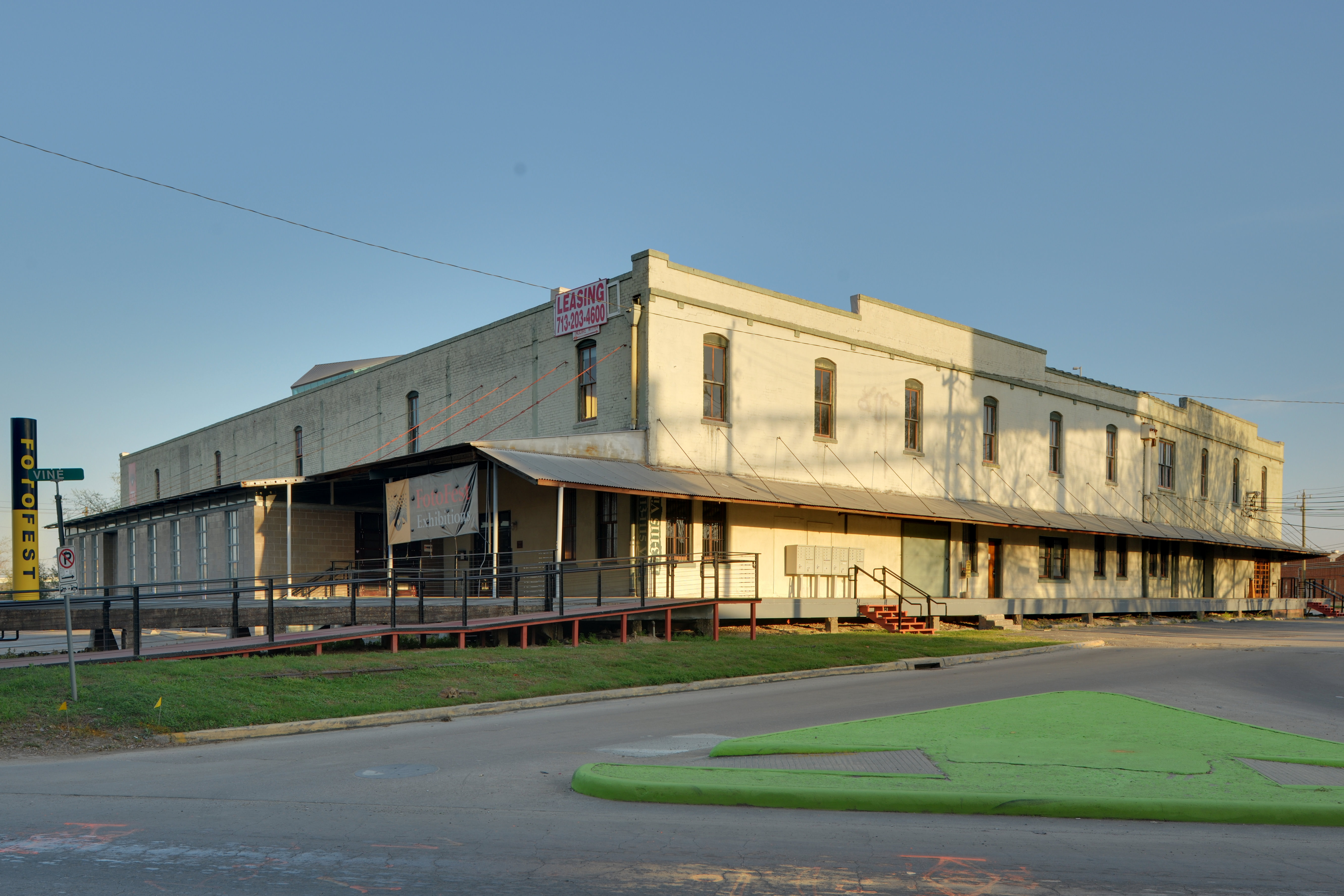
- The building in March 2011

- Location within Texas Location within the United States
- Location: 1113 Vine Street; Houston, Texas
- Coordinates: 29°46′12″N 95°21′25″W
- Area: 1.3 acres (0.53 ha)
- Built: 1917
- NRHP reference No.: 00001665
- Added to NRHP: January 16, 2001

The Union Transfer and Storage Building is a building in Houston, Texas, in the United States. Constructed in 1917, it was added to the National Register of Historic Places on January 16, 2001.

== See also ==
- National Register of Historic Places listings in Harris County, Texas
