= Star Engraving Company Building =

- U.S. National Register of Historic Places
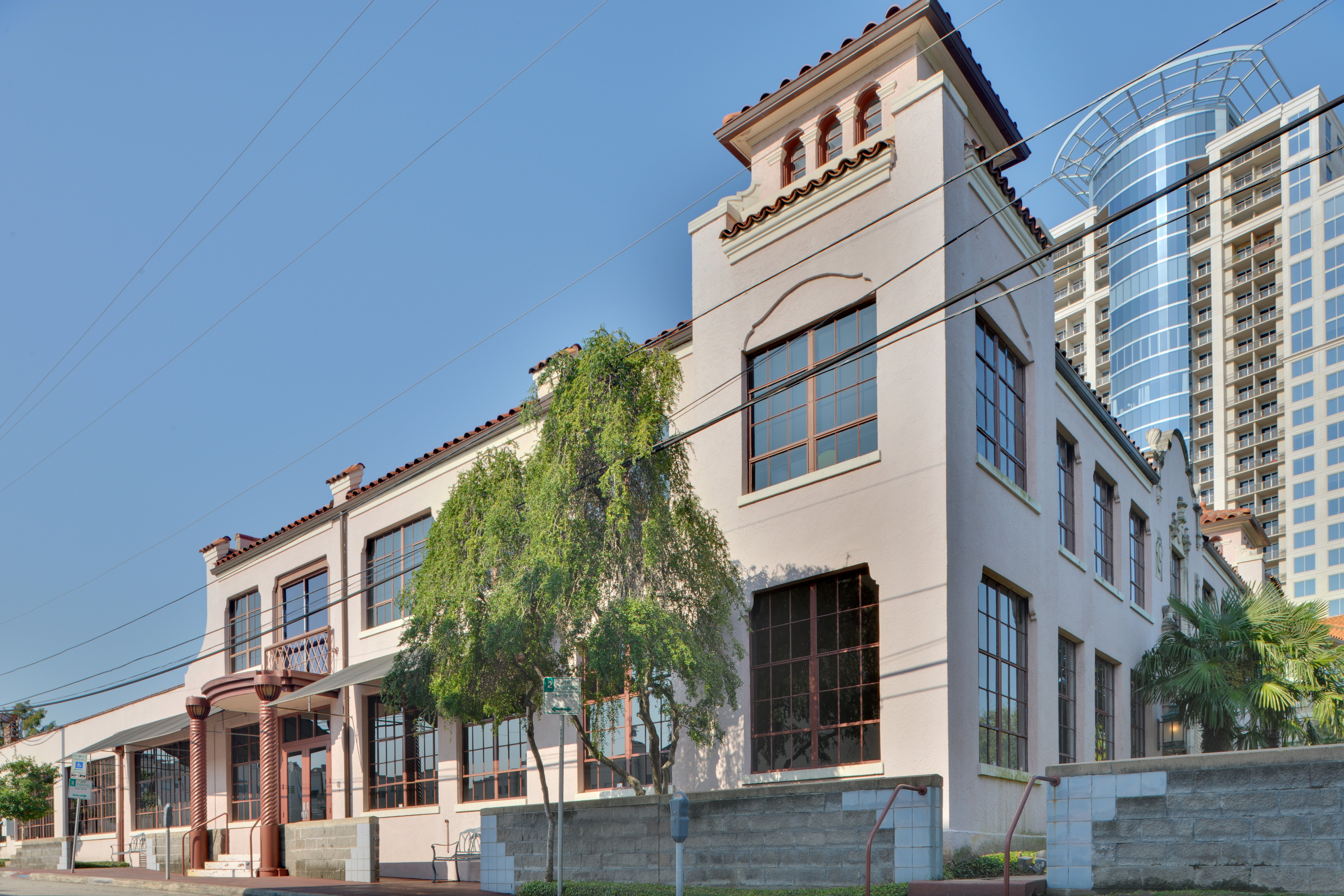
- The building's exterior in 2010

- Location within Texas Location within the United States
- Location: 3201 Allen Pkwy; Houston, Texas
- Coordinates: 29°45′37″N 95°23′57″W
- Area: less than one acre
- Built: 1930
- Architect: R. D. Steele
- Architectural style: Spanish Colonial Revival
- NRHP reference No.: 94001521
- Added to NRHP: January 6, 1995

The Star Engraving Company Building is a building at 3201 Allen Parkway in Houston, Texas, built in 1930 in the Spanish Colonial Revival style by the Star Engraving company to house its engraving factory. The building is currently (as of 2020) privately owned.

== Historical landmark ==
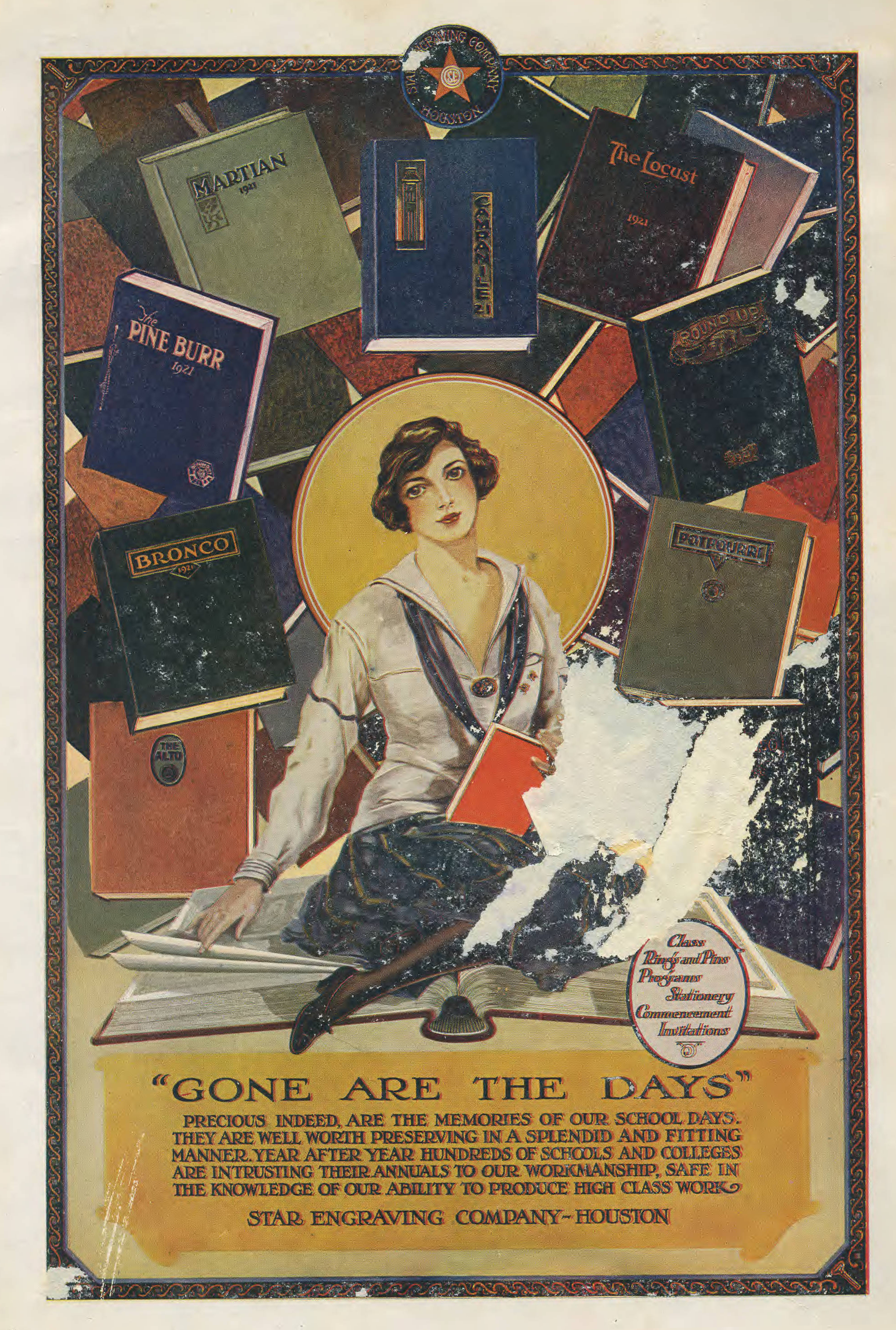
1921 Star Engraving Company advertisement

It was designated a local historic landmark in 1986, and was listed on the National Register of Historic Places in 1995.

== Residents ==
The Stages Repertory Theatre had resided in the building since 1985 until they moved into the new "Gordy" Theater Facility, and the Children's Museum of Houston resided there until 1992. In 2020, the property was acquired by Houston-based real estate firm Radom Capital and remodeled into boutique offices, restaurant and retail space. Currently, it is a mixed-use building that is the site of the Electrolit US headquarters

The building became the subject of controversy in 1992 when then-owner 3201 Allen Parkway Ltd. indicated its intent to evict the Stages Theatre and the Children's Museum in order to develop the building into loft condominia in partnership with developer Gross Investments. The Children's Museum had long been planning a move to the Museum District anyway, but Stages and its supporters protested that a move would greatly harm the theatre, and requested local-government assistance in buying the building. A few months later, the development deal with Gross Investments fell through, and 3201 Allen Parkway Ltd. offered to sell the building to Stages. However, Stages couldn't meet its asking price and negotiations broke down. The City of Houston eventually purchased the building, after a controversial threat to use eminent domain powers to confiscate it, and turned it into a municipal arts center.
