= Fire Station No. 9 (Terre Haute, Indiana) =

- U.S. National Register of Historic Places
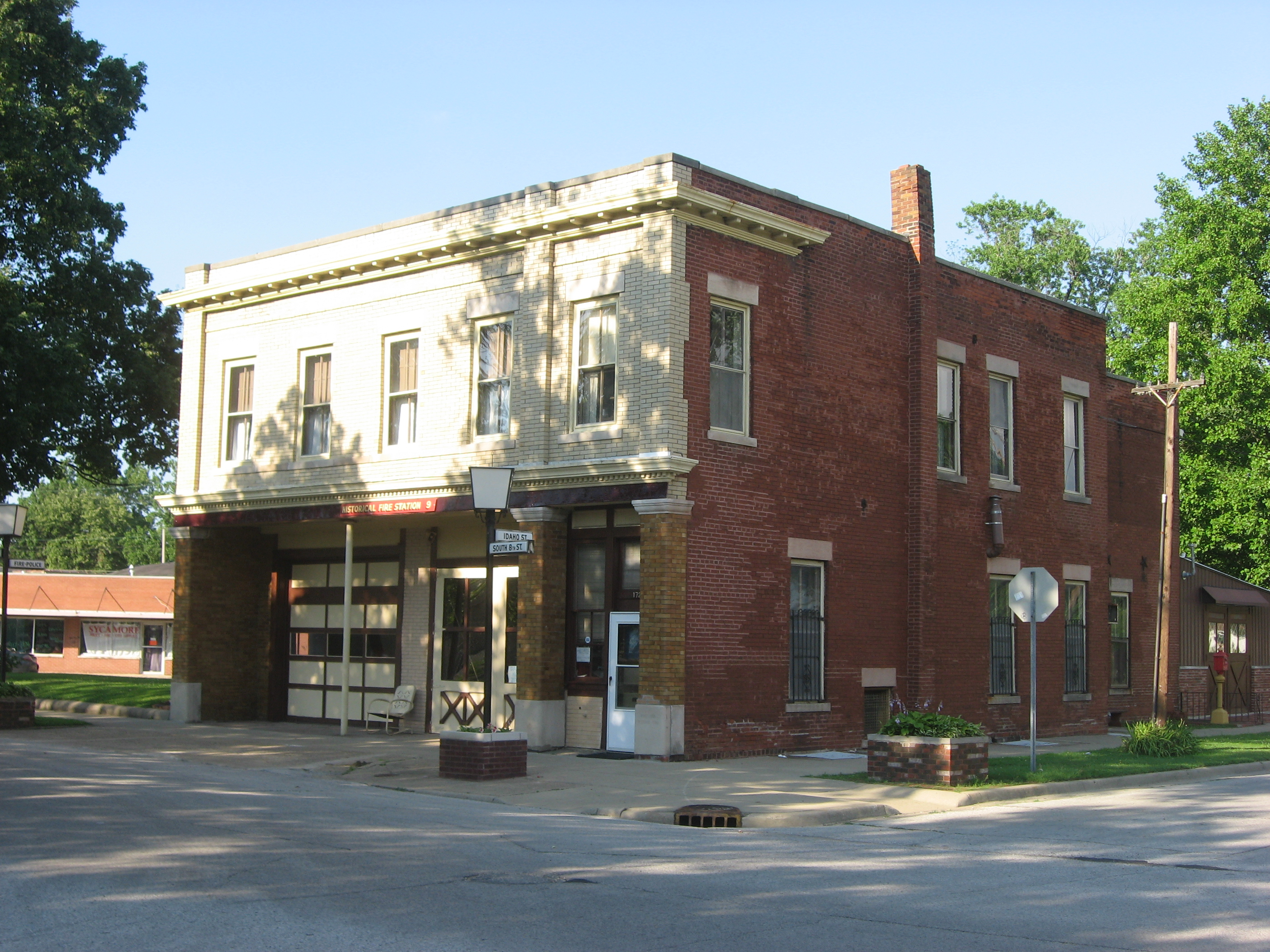

- Location within Indiana Location within the United States
- Location: 1728 S. 8th St., Terre Haute, Indiana
- Coordinates: 39°26′51″N 87°24′19″W
- Area: less than one acre
- Built: 1906
- NRHP reference No.: 82000049
- Added to NRHP: December 16, 1982

The Fire Station No. 9 in Terre Haute, Indiana was built in 1906. It was listed on the National Register of Historic Places in 1982.

It is a two-story brick building which was operated as a fire station until 1980.
