= Courtlandt Place, Houston =

Historic district in Houston, Texas

- Courtlandt Place Historic District
- U.S. National Register of Historic Places
- U.S. Historic district
- Location within Texas Location within the United States
- Location: 2–26 Courtlandt Place, Houston, Texas
- Coordinates: 29.743°N 95.384°W
- Architect: Birdsall Briscoe, Alfred C. Finn, Sanguinet & Staats, John F. Staub, Carlos B. Schoeppl, Warren and Wetmore
- Architectural style: Tudor Revival, Colonial Revival, Late 19th and 20th Century Revivals
- NRHP reference No.: 80004129
- Added to NRHP: December 3, 1980

Courtlandt Place is a residential subdivision consisting of a single street south of downtown Houston, Texas, planned in 1906. Courtlandt Place is a member of the Neartown Houston Association.

== Overview ==
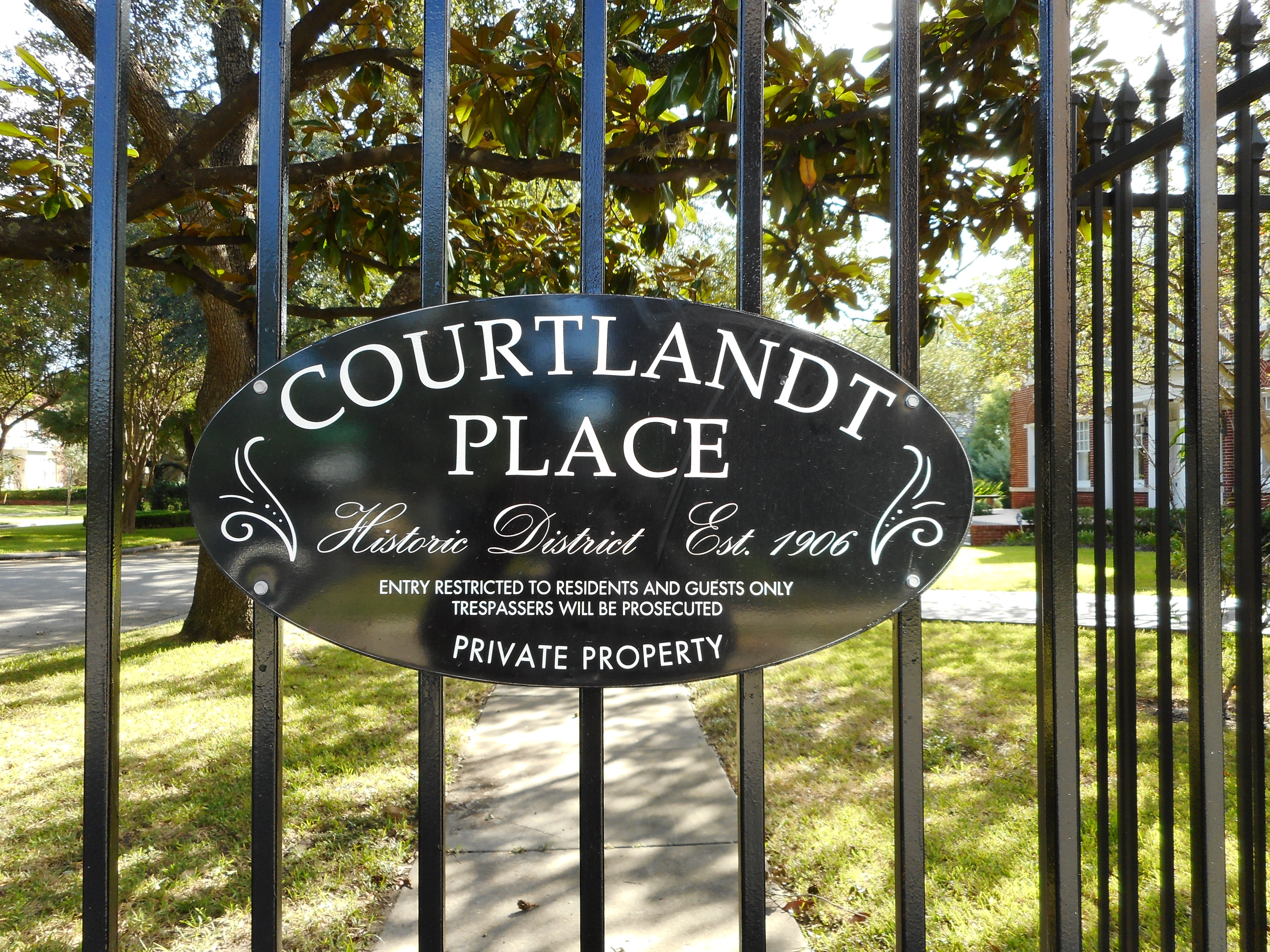
West gate at Courtlandt Place

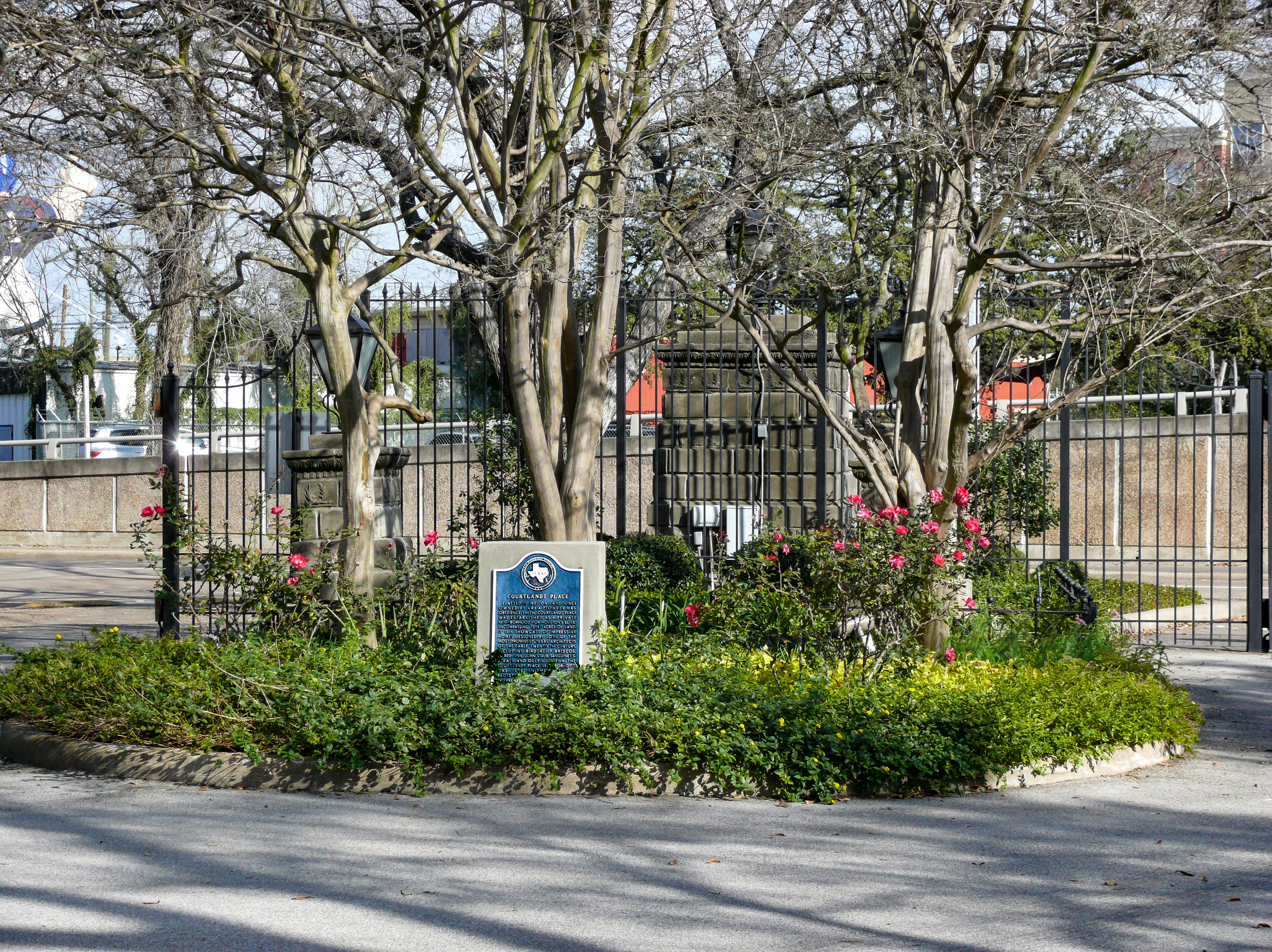
Texas Historical marker for Courtlandt Place, near entrance

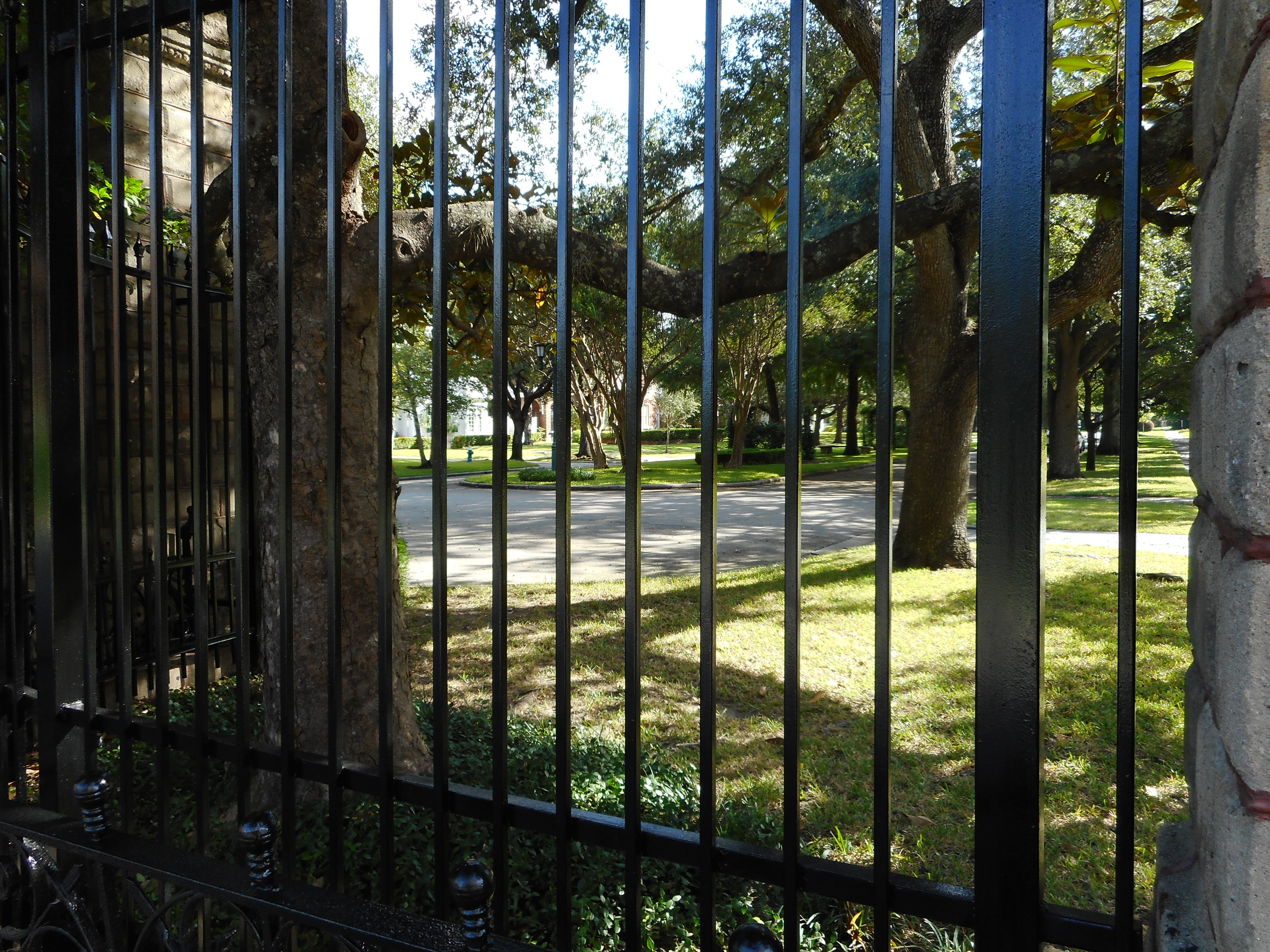
View of the Courtlandt Place esplanade from the west gate

Courtlandt Place is a subdivision of Houston, Texas. Courtlandt Place Historic District has been NRHP-listed since 1980, and the district includes eleven houses which carry individual NRHP-listings. "Courtlandt Place" denotes a residential boulevard, a subdivision, and a Historic District, all of which occupy the same location. The Courtlandt Improvement Company developed Courtlandt Place as a single street, gated on both ends, based on private places in St. Louis, which are designed to restrict access to non-residents. Although the company began planning and building infrastructure in 1906, the first houses were built in 1909 or 1910. The Courtlandt Improvement Association also established extensive deed restrictions which regulated house size, land use, and minimum building cost. Unlike many covenants which specified a length of tenure, Courtlandt Place restrictions were written to never expire. In addition, they prohibited all forms of commercial land use.

What made Courtlandt Place a private place was its private street. The residents owned the street, not the City of Houston, nor any other government entity. The residents faced a challenge from a developer of an adjacent neighborhood. John Wesley Link, who laid out a landscaped Montrose Boulevard with termini at Hathaway Avenue (now part of Westheimer) and Richmond Avenue, built his own mansion west of Courtlandt Place. Attracting high-dollar lot sales would be difficult without good street access to downtown. His Lovett Boulevard was blocked by a wall at the west end of Courtlandt Place, and he lobbied the City of Houston to condemn the private street in order to make it a public one. Anticipating that the City of Houston would win its suit against them, the residents of Courtlandt Place agreed to a compromise with the City of Houston near the end of 1912: they would open access to their street in exchange for city services. These included street paving and maintenance, installation of lights, and a promise to control traffic. For seventy years, Courtlandt Place remained a public street until the neighborhood paid $103,115 to the City of Houston to re-privatize the street, which allowed them to rebuild the western gate.

== History of houses and residents ==
Notable architects who designed houses in the neighborhood included Birdsall Briscoe, Alfred C. Finn, John Fanz Staub, Carlos B. Schoeppl, Sanguinet & Staats, and Warren and Wetmore. Fourteen of the properties were developed between 1910 and 1916, while the other five properties were developed between 1920 and 1927.

=== C. L. Neuhaus House ===
The C. L. "Baron" Neuhaus House at 6 Courtlandt Place was designed in the Colonial Revival style by Sanguinet & Staats for the local banker in 1910 (NRHP-listed). This was the first home finished in the subdivision. The property also included outbuildings, partly to support small-scale farming activities. The lot included a hen house, two stables, a garage, and servants quarters.

The house is named for Franz Charles "Charley" Ludwig Neuhaus (1857–1930). Originally from Hackberry, Texas, he moved to Houston in 1906, where he served as a director for the Texas Rice Mill Company and Union National Bank, and was an investment banker. He co-founded the Houston Golf Club and he joined the Houston Country Club as a charter member. He was a developer of Courtlandt Place as he was a principal of the Courtlandt Investment Company, and also served as a trustee. His wife, Emilie "Millie" Joanna Boettcher Neuhaus (1861–1843), came from a family of Central Texas Germans, and she hired cooks who knew the food of this culture. As a child, Millie left Texas to attend school in Germany.

=== Sterling Myer House ===
The Sterling Myer House at 4 Courtlandt Place (NRHP-listed) was another home built in 1910 by Sanguinet & Staats. Sterling Myer (1872—1938), from Plantersville, Texas, was the managing partner of the Courtlandt Improvement Company. He was a partner with the legal firm Campbell and Myer, which also represented Courtlandt Place until 1912. Sterling and his wife Alice Bentley Myer (1873—1968) resided there for just a few years.

=== A. S. Cleveland House ===
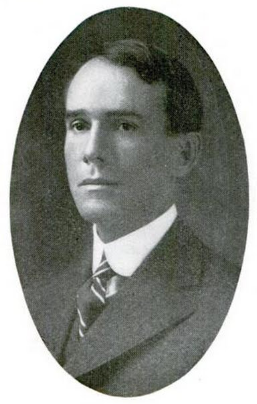
Photograph of Alexander Sessums Cleveland, before 1922

The A. S. Cleveland House at 8 Courtlandt Place (NRHP-listed) was built by Alfred C. Finn and Sanguinet & Staats in 1911. The Colonial Revival includes some Italian Renaissance details. However, another source credits design to A.E. Barnes with Sanguinet & Staats. John Staub executed a commission in 1929 to redesign the interiors. Staub added a first floor dressing room, and decorated the living room with birch paneling and the fireplace with marble cladding.

Alexander Sessums "Sess" Cleveland (1871–1954) was a son of W.D. Cleveland, the owner of the leading grocery and cotton factoring house in Houston. The elder Cleveland's business later fell into distress, but two of his sons were able to cover his debts. Sess sold the cotton factoring house, prior to falling prices for the commodity during the 1920s. He married Virginia Cunningham (1875–1965) of Savannah, Georgia in 1896. The couple lived in this house from 1911 to 1950. Cleveland was a cotton factor and grocer in Houston. He was also a civic leader, serving as president of the American Red Cross (Houston Chapter), president of the Houston Chamber of Commerce, trustee for Rice University and University of the South, and served on the Houston school board. Their daughter and their son-in-law, William A. Kirkland, moved into this house sometime in the 1950s. The Kirklands previously resided 10 Courtlandt Place.

=== James L. Autry House ===
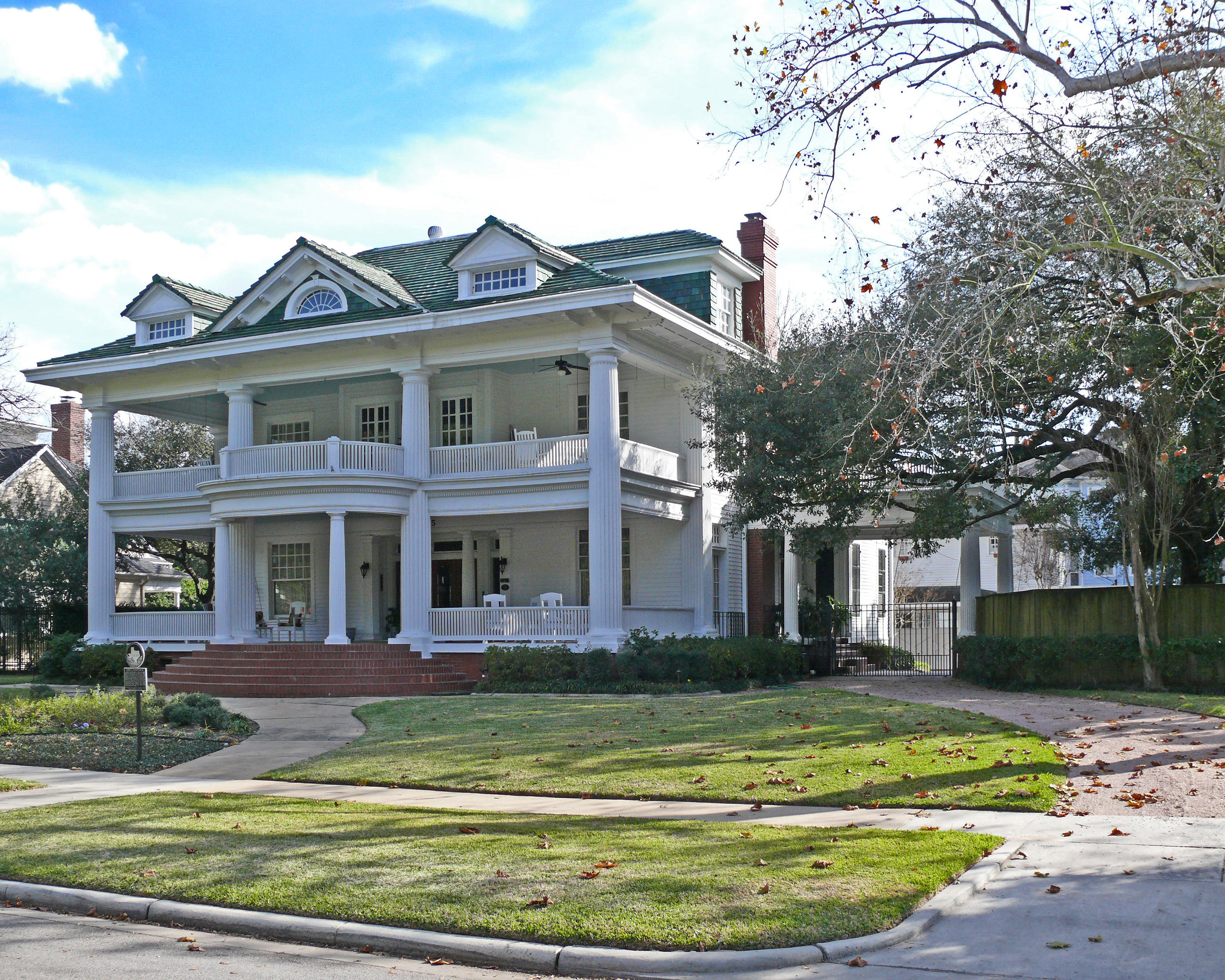
James L. Autry House, 5 Courtlandt Place, Houston, Texas, 1912

The James L. Autry House (Courtlandt Place, Houston), 5 Courtlandt Place, was a house designed and built for James Lockhart Autry, II by the Houston office of Sanguinet & Staats in 1912 (NRHP-listed). The house is still used as a residence and is NRHP-listed. Autry was born in Holly Springs, Mississippi in 1859 and moved to Texas in 1876. Autry served as a general counsel for Joseph Cullinan's oil ventures, following Cullinan to the Texas Company, better known as Texaco. The lot at 3 Courtlandt Place was developed concurrently with 5 Courtlandt Place in 1912.

=== J. J. Carroll House ===
The J.J. Carroll House at 16 Courtlandt Place (NRHP-listed) was built in the neoclassical style by Birdsall Briscoe in 1912. However, another account claims that Carroll himself used a pattern design for the house, the only home in Courtlandt Place which was not a custom design. In 1924, the Carrolls commissioned Briscoe to make extensive enhancements to the interior.

The house is named for Judson J. Carroll (1877–1938), who married Lena Carter (1879–1971), a daughter of W.T. and Maude Carter, and a sister of Frankie Carter Randolph, all Courtlandt Place residents. Judson had worked as an executive for the Carter Lumber Company, but he is better known as an expert avocationist on regional ornithology, and won awards for his photography in the field. He was an advocate for protecting coastal environments for birds, and was honored with the naming of Carroll Island, along the southern Texas coast. For a time, his house served as a regional office for the Audubon Society. The house was restored in the 1970s.

=== W. T. Carter Jr. House ===
The W. T. Carter Jr. House at 18 Courtlandt Place (NRHP-listed) was also designed by Birdsall Briscoe in 1912, and was the only home in Courtlandt Place built in the Prairie style. Briscoe collaborated with Olle J. Lorehn.

The house was built for W. T. "Bill" Carter Jr. (1887–1957) and Lillie Neuhaus Carter (1890–1966). Bill was both the nephew and adopted son of W. T. Carter Sr., of 14 Courtlandt Place. Starting in 1919, Bill assumed the management of W. T. Carter's banking and real estate interests, and later built a formidable real estate empire of his own, including his Carter Investment Company. He was the brainchild of the Houston International Airport, later known as Hobby Airport.

=== E. L. Neville House ===
Birdsall Briscoe built this Tudor home at 11 Courtlandt Place in 1914. Edwin Linscott "Ned" Neville (1879–1937) was a native of Virginia who moved to Houston in 1896. He was a business partner with cotton merchant and Courtlandt Place resident, John Dorrance. During World War I, he was the deputy State Food Administrator. He chaired the board at Jefferson Davis Hospital. He married Daphne Palmer (1879–1949) in 1912, who later founded the Houston Junior League. She was the granddaughter of Houston banker, Benjamin A. Shepherd.

=== Mrs. W. T. Carter Sr. House ===
The Mrs. W.T. Carter Sr. House at 14 Courtlandt Place was another Tudor-style home on the block that was designed by Birdsall Briscoe. The home was completed in 1920. W.T. "Will" Carter (1856–1921) built this house for his wife, Maude Holley Carter (1858–1929), the second home he established after moving his company headquarters and his family to Houston in 1908. Will Carter continued to spend his time managing sawmill operations in Polk County, Texas, while maintaining a mansion on Main Street. By this time, Carter owned several sawmills in East Texas, with banking and real estate interests in Houston. In 1920, he moved into the Tudor home with his wife and their daughter, Frankie Carter Randolph, who also brought her family. The patriarch died the next year.

Prior to her family locating in Courtlandt Place, Frankie Carter (1894–1972) attended the Baldwin School in Pennsylvania. Aubrey, her older brother, matriculated at the University of Virginia during part of her time at the Baldwin School. In 1918, Frankie married Aubrey's college classmate, Robert Decan "Deke" Randolph (1891–1989). Prior to their union Deke served the United States Naval Air Corps in France. In 1920, Deke and Frankie Randolph Carter moved their family to her parents’ home at 14 Courtlandt Place. Deke entered the family business, working for the Carter Lumber Company. After 1924, he began a long career in banking. Frankie Carter Randolph was a founding member of the Houston Junior League and the League of Women Voters. She was the first white Houstonian to join the NAACP. She was a Democratic activist, who supported the candidacy of Adlai Stevenson for President of the United States.

=== J. W. Garrow House ===
The J. W. Garrow House at 19 Courtlandt Place represents the third Birdsall Briscoe design in the neighborhood from 1914, this one a Colonial Revival/Beaux Arts hybrid. John Wanroy Garrow (1879–1944) was from a second generation of Houston cotton merchants in his family and a president of the Houston Cotton Exchange. He was a director for several local companies, including the American General Insurance Company. He married Marie Etta Brady (1887–1941), daughter of John Brady, a founder of the Houston Ship Channel Company and a real estate developer.

=== John M. Dorrance House ===
The John M. Dorrance House at 9 Courtlandt Place (NRHP-listed) is a stucco house designed by Sanguinet & Staats in 1914. John Dorrance (1852–1935) spent six decades in the cotton business. He came to Houston in 1891 to work for H. H. Garrow and Company. Before the turn of the century he started Dorrance and Company. He was vice-president of the Houston Cotton Exchange. He developed real estate in downtown Houston, including the Savoy Apartments, and the Dorrance building at 114 Main Street. He was married to Ada Knapp Dorrance (1860–1933), and they had two daughters and two sons.

=== Thomas J. Donoghue House ===
The Thomas J. Donoghue House at 17 Courtlandt Place (NRHP-listed) was designed for the executive vice-president of the Texas Company in 1916 by Warren and Wetmore, the firm that designed Grand Central Station in New York City.

Thomas J. "T. J." Donoghue (1869–1945) was born in the Pennsylvania oilfields to a local refiner. When he was a young teenager, he sold newspapers and worked for Western Union. After eighteen years of employment at Standard Oil, he accepted a job from J. S. Cullinan in Texas. He was a colleague of James Autry at the Texas Company. He married Mamie Sullivan (1875–1963) in 1896. He was engaged with many local and national non-profits, most of which had Christian affiliations.

=== Judson L. Taylor House ===
The Judson Taylor House at 20 Courtlandt Place (NRHP-listed) is the last of six works that Birdsall Briscoe completed in the neighborhood, a Colonial Revival finished in 1916.

This house was originally home to Dr. Judson Ludwell Taylor (1881–1944) and Jessie Carter Taylor (1881–1947). Jessie was a daughter of Maude and W. T. Carter Sr. The couple married in 1903, the same year Judson earned a degree in medicine from the University of Texas. In 1912, Dr. Taylor retired from the United States Navy and established a general surgery practice. He later specialized in orthopedic surgery, practicing at Houston Shriners' Hospital and Hermann Hospital. He later co-founded Jefferson Davis Hospital, where he also worked as a surgeon. He assumed various leadership positions within the Houston medical community, including the Baylor College of Medicine, and the Harris County Medical Society. On the other hand, Jessie used the house for unconventional entertainment. During prohibition, she transformed her basement into a gambling room and also sponsored boxing matches.

=== Underwood Nazro House ===
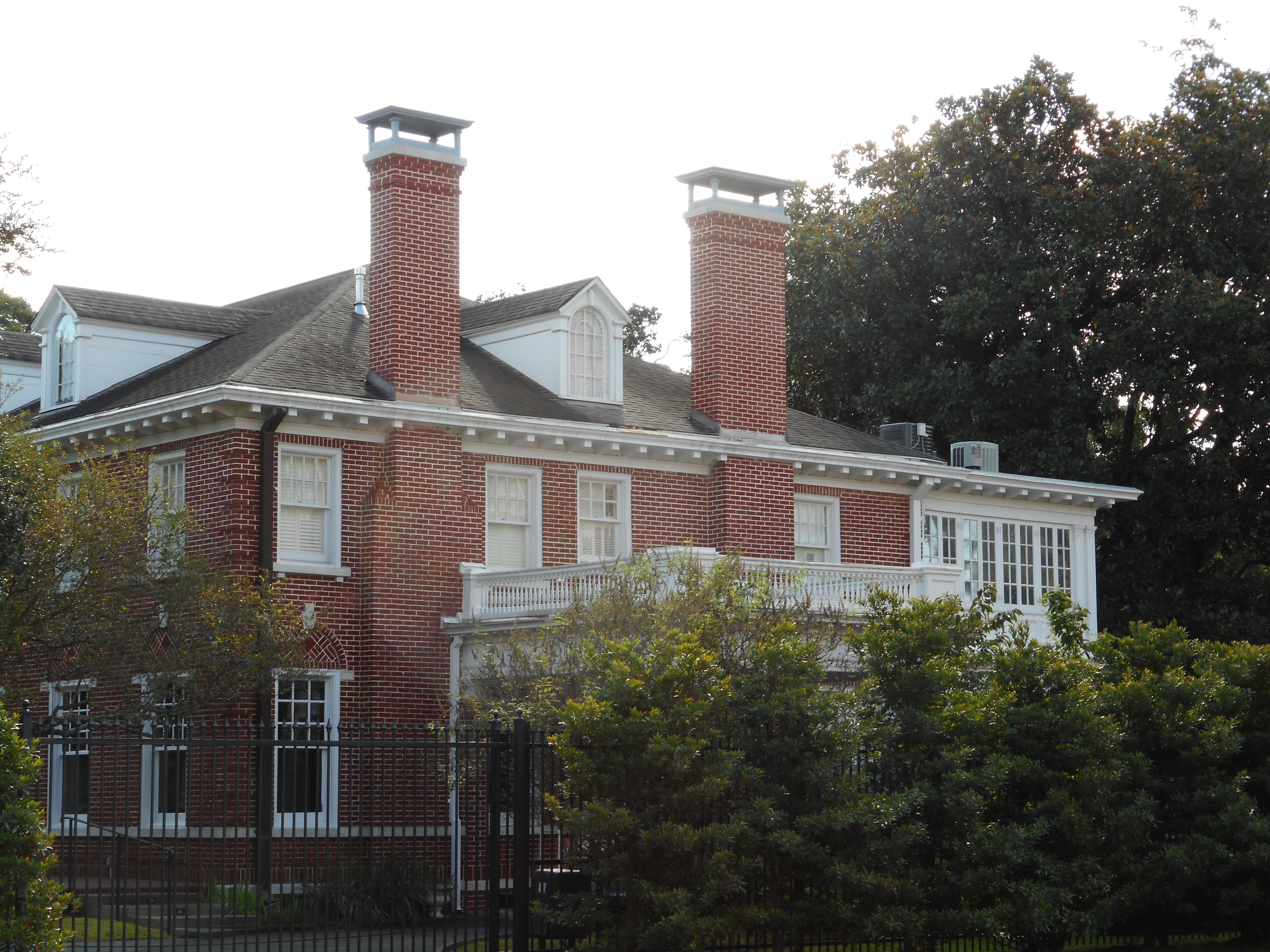
Underwood Nazro House, viewed from Lovett Boulevard

The Underwood Nazro House at 25 Courtlandt Place is a Colonial Revival completed in 1916. Sanguinet & Staats designed this home, and it represents their seventh and last commission in the neighborhood. Underwood Nazro (1875–1935) was an officer of Gulf Oil Company and one of its initial investors. Nazro was a native of Kentucky. After moving to Texas, he married Clara Wheeler (1882–1942) of Beaumont, Texas, whose family money capitalized Nazro's ventures. The couple moved to River Oaks before 1935.

=== Jones–Hunt House ===
The Jones–Hunt House at 24 Courtlandt Place (NRHP-listed) was built in 1920. Alfred C. Finn, this time commissioning residential work with his own firm, moved an 1890 Victorian structure to the site and added brick cladding to recreate it in a Spanish-mode. In all, Finn performed architectural work on three properties in the neighborhood, two while he worked for Sanguinet & Staats, and the Jones-Hunt House, which was designed by his own firm.

Sarah Brashear Jones was the mother of Murray Brashear Jones, who moved into the house next door in 1925. She purchased the lot from Captain James Addison Baker. Her father, Isaac Brashear, first arrived in Houston in 1839, just a few years after the city's founding, and established a farm that was later a part of the Houston Heights.

=== Murray B. Jones House ===
The Murray B. Jones House at 22 Courtlandt Place is a stucco building with colonial elements, completed in 1925. The architect is unknown according to one source. Another source attributes the architectural work to Birdsall Briscoe, and characterizes the style as Georgian Revival.

The Murray B. Jones House represents Courtlandt Place connections to an old-guard Houston family. Captain James A. Baker purchased the lot, then built this home for his daughter Alice Baker Jones (1887–1978) and her husband, Murray Brashear Jones (1886–1963). Captain Baker practiced law with Baker, Botts, and Baker, a top law firm in Houston founded by his father, who was also named James Addison Baker. The Bakers were long-associated with William Marsh Rice, and the firm bearing their name represented Rice's estate after he died under suspicious circumstances. Murray Jones also had deep Houston roots, though with humbler origins through his grandfather, Isaac Brashear. Murray matriculated at the University of Texas and Princeton University, and again at the University of Texas to study law. He practiced law in Texas between 1910 and 1960. However, Murray and Alice Jones did not stay together for much longer, divorcing in the 1920s. Alice remained in the house until 1946.

=== Johnelle Bryan House ===
The Johnelle Bryan House at 15 Courtlandt Place is of an Italian Renaissance design by Carlos B Schoeppl, his only commission in the neighborhood, which he finished in 1925. Also known as the Bryan-Chapman House, the original residents were Caroline Bryan Chapman (1859–1933) and Johnelle Bryan (1861–1935). Their three brothers died in the Civil War, and they lost their father in 1867. The sisters hosted musical performances in this house, and were local patrons of the performing arts. Joseph F. and Wadesha Bashara acquired the home in 1935, and like the previous owners, they used it as a venue for live music.

Schoeppl was famous for his Spanish and Mediterranean Revival architecture houses in Texas and Florida. This building was designed to prominently feature Ludowici tile for the roof and Acme brick for the walls.

=== John W. Parker House ===
The John W. Parker House at 25 Courtlandt Place (NRHP-listed) represents the only work in Courtlandt Place by John Fanz Staub (1925-1926). The austere country house included a large gardens, though some of these grounds were later lost to a highway. John Wilson "Judge" Parker (1861–1930) established his first law practice in Taylor, Texas before moving to Houston. He married Bessie "Monie" Coelhite (1864–1948), whom he met in Taylor while she was teaching music. Later generations resided in the home after 1930, though the family left Courtlandt Place after 1945.

=== William A. Kirkland House ===
The William A. Kirkland House at 10 Courtlandt Place was built in 1937. The architect is unknown. William Alexander Kirkland was an alumnus of Andover Academy and Yale University. A veteran of World War I, he returned to Houston and worked at local banks, rising to the positions of president and chairman of First National Bank. Kirkland attended the meetings called by Jesse H. Jones in 1931 during the banking local banking crisis. His book Old Bank—New Bank included his account of these meetings. He worked under Jones in Washington for the Reconstruction Finance Corporation.

== Government ==
The Harris Health System (formerly Harris County Hospital District) designated the Casa de Amigos Health Center in the Near Northside for the ZIP code 77006. The designated public hospital is Ben Taub General Hospital in the Texas Medical Center.

== Education ==
Residents are in the Houston Independent School District (HISD), and are zoned to Macgregor Elementary School, Gregory-Lincoln Education Center (for middle school), and Lamar High School.
