= Birdsall Briscoe =

American architect

Birdsall Parmenas Briscoe (June 10, 1876 – 1971) was an American architect active in Texas, especially in Houston. Several of his works have been listed on the U.S. National Register of Historic Places for their architecture.

== Early life ==
Briscoe was born on June 10, 1876, in Harrisburg, Texas, as son of Andrew Birdsall and Annie Frances (Paine) Briscoe. Andrew Briscoe was a grandfather and John Richardson Harris, founder of Harrisburg, was a great-grandfather. His parents owned a ranch near Goliad, Texas. He left the area to attend San Antonio Academy, a preparatory school in San Antonio, Texas. He matriculated at Texas A&M University and the University of Texas.

== Career ==
Briscoe trained as an architect under C. Lewis Wilson and Lewis Sterling Green, while later forming a three-year partnership with Green. He opened his own practice in 1912. He shared an office in downtown Houston with fellow architect, Maurice P. Sullivan. He was selected by the River Oaks Company as one of three architects to design nine model homes in the nascent subdivision.

While still working outside of a partnership, Briscoe designed three homes in the private street subdivision of Courtlandt Place, Houston. He completed the J. J. Carroll House, the W. T. Carter Jr. House, and the Judson L. Taylor House before World War I. All three are listed on the National Register for Historic Places. He won commissions for two homes in Houston for William Lockhart Clayton, both of which are historic landmarks. The first was the Georgian-Revival home sited on a whole city block in the Southmore Addition. In 1924, Briscoe completed the William L. Clayton Summer House (NRHP-listed) in River Oaks, the first property to be developed in the subdivision.

Briscoe's work can also be found in the Broadacres Historic District in Houston. He designed four houses on South Boulevard with his partner Sam H. Dixon Jr. Two of these — the Clarence L. Carter and Walter H. Walne houses — employed prominent bays to create an asymmetrical medieval motif. The partners built a federal-style house for William D. Cleveland Jr. and a Spanish-style house for John F. Dickson Jr. They severed the partnership in 1926, after which Briscoe designed another four houses in Broadacres as a sole-practitioner. The first of these, the Cotswold-style Bettie G. Lester House on North Boulevard, marks a transition in Briscoe's work. He built an Italian villa for Burdine Clayton Anderson, then two more homes on North Boulevard, one for Robert W. Wier, and another for Edmond Pincoffs.

Briscoe served as associate architect to John F. Staub in the development of Bayou Bend, a sprawling mansion sited on a fourteen-acre lot in River Oaks. The home was built between 1926 and 1928 under the consultation of Ima Hogg, who lived there with her brothers, Will and Mike. Hogg bequeathed the estate to the Museum of Fine Arts, Houston, which operates the property as a museum annex for the Bayou Bend Collection of decorative arts. Bayou Bend is NRHP-listed.

Briscoe was a veteran of the Spanish–American War and World War I.

== Death ==
Briscoe died on September 19, 1971, in Houston. He was interred at Oak Hill Cemetery in Goliad.

== Bibliography ==
Barnstone, Howard (1979). The Architecture of John F. Staub: Houston and the South. Austin: University of Texas University Press. ISBN 0-292-74012-3. Fox, Stephen (2023). The Architecture of Birdsall P. Briscoe. College Station: Texas A&M University Press. ISBN 978-1-64843-052-7.
