= Fire Station No. 9 (Kansas City, Kansas) =

- U.S. National Register of Historic Places
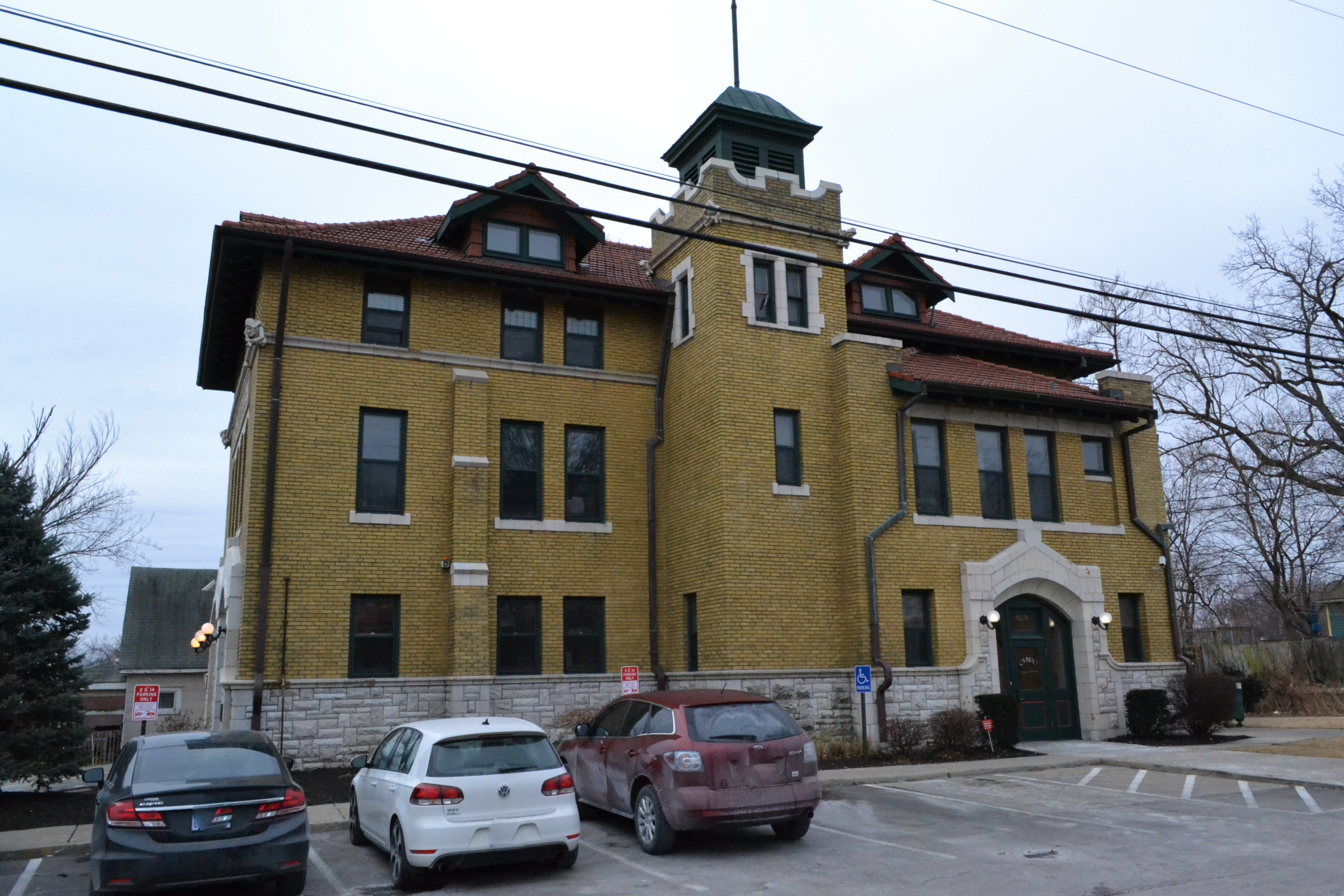

- Location within Kansas Location within the United States
- Location: 2 S. 14th St., Kansas City, Kansas
- Coordinates: 39°06′14″N 94°38′42″W
- Area: 0.2 acres (0.081 ha)
- Built: 1911
- Architect: Harris, William E.
- Architectural style: Prairie School, Tudor Revival
- NRHP reference No.: 85001982
- Added to NRHP: September 5, 1985

Fire Station No. 9 was located at 2 South 14th Street in Kansas City, Kansas. Designed by William E. Harris, it was declared a Kansas City, Kansas Historic Landmark on June 16, 1983. The fire station was placed on the Register of Historic Kansas Places on July 3, 1979, and the National Register of Historic Places on September 5, 1985. It has also been known as the Prescott Neighborhood Center. The building is currently owned and occupied by Community Housing of Wyandotte County. The new Fire Station No. 9 is located at 1100 Central Ave. in Kansas City, Kansas.

== History ==
Fire Station No. 9 was completed in 1911 and is an excellent example of the "free eclecticism" of early 20th century design. It was built at a time when Kansas City was experiencing a large economic boom and was one of many civic improvements the city implemented between 1910 and 1927. The station's service area was bounded on the north by Minnesota Ave, on the south by Muncie Bvld, on the east by 10th St, and on the west by 37th St. Also inside this boundary was Bethany Hospital which was completed the same year as Fire Station No. 9.

Little is known about the architect, William E. Harris. However, he also designed Fire Station No.8 which had an identical floor plan to No. 9, but with differences in the exterior. In 1984, Fire Station No. 8 had to be demolished due to extensive damage related to arson.

Records indicated that when Fire Station No. 9 opened in 1911, it utilized an Anderson combination chemical and hose wagon. This wagon would have been pulled by horses and carrying a crew of four. There are no remaining physical traces of this type fire wagon still in the building.

In 1950, the front doors of the station were widened and elevated in order to accommodate larger fire engines and the north and west doors were filled in. However, the fire station would cease operations in 1967 when the new Fire Station No. 9 took over. The building was given to city painters and carpenters who used it for storage until the city agreed to convert it to a neighborhood community center in 1975–76. The exterior was remodeled in 1977 and the north and west doors were reopened. Interior remodeling took place the following year.

== Appearance ==
It has at least two terra cotta gargoyles depicting dwarf-like firemen projecting from corners.
