= Riverside General Hospital =

Geography
- Location: Houston, Texas, United States

History
- Former name: Houston Negro Hospital
- Opened: 1926

Links
- Lists: Hospitals in Texas
- Houston Negro Hospital
- U.S. National Register of Historic Places
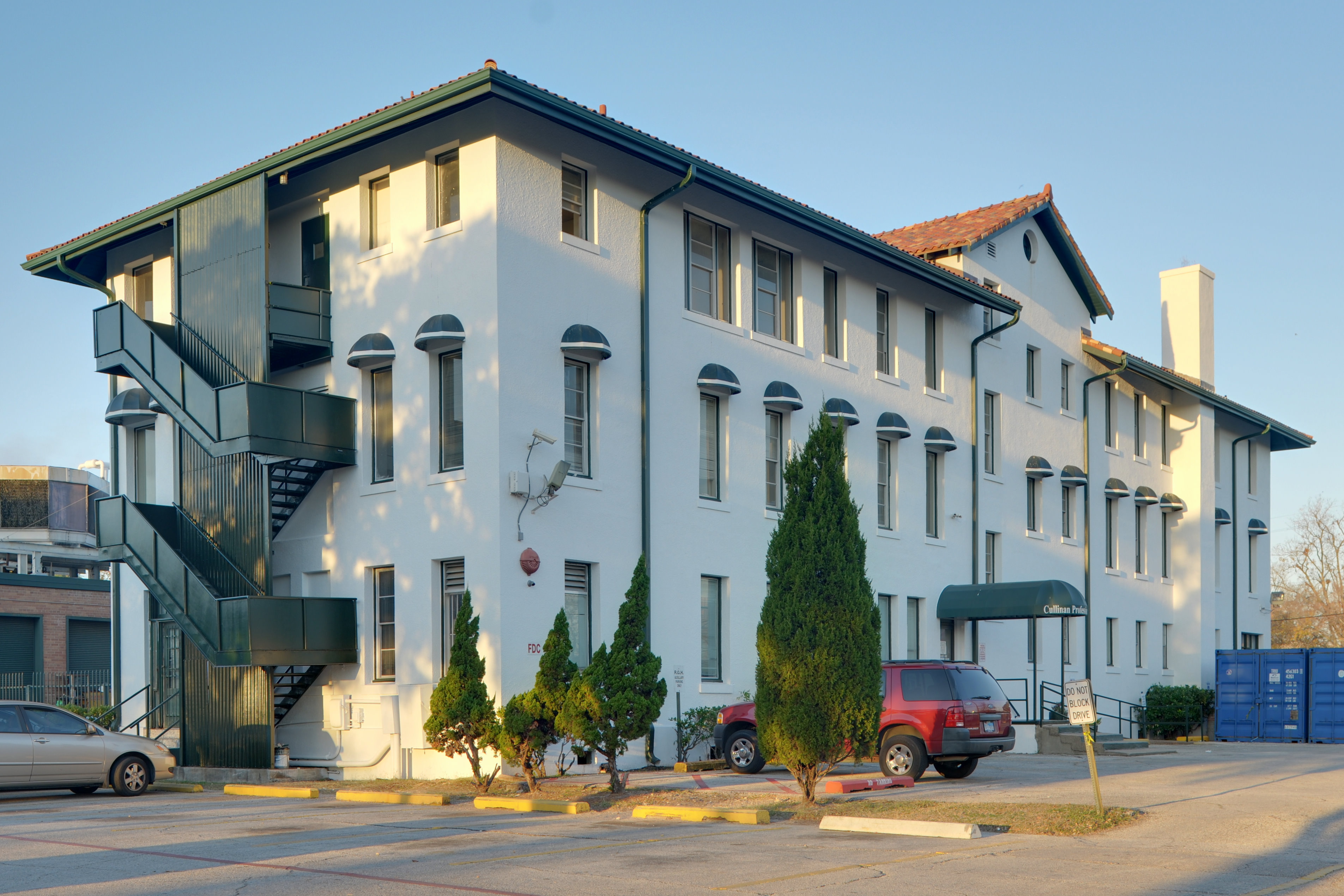
- The building in 2010

- Location within Texas Location within the United States
- Location: 3204 Ennis Street; Houston, Texas
- Coordinates: 29°43′52″N 95°21′37″W
- Area: less than one acre
- Built: 1926
- Architect: Maurice J. Sullivan
- Architectural style: Mission/Spanish Revival
- NRHP reference No.: 82004856
- Added to NRHP: December 27, 1982

The Houston Negro Hospital is the original name of a hospital in Houston, Texas. Upon the completion of an expansion project to add an extra wing to the hospital in 1961, the entire facility was renamed Riverside General Hospital.

The original building, located at 3204 Ennis Street, was added to the National Register of Historic Places on December 27, 1982.

== See also ==
- Houston Negro Hospital School of Nursing Building
- National Register of Historic Places listings in Harris County, Texas
