= Fire Engine House No. 9 =

- U.S. National Register of Historic Places
- Location within Texas
- Location: 1810-1812 Keene St., Houston, Texas
- Coordinates: 29°46′31″N 95°21′05″W
- Area: less than one acre
- Built: 1899
- Architect: William A. McMillen
- NRHP reference No.: 85003238
- Added to NRHP: October 17, 1985

Fire Engine House No. 9, at 1810-1812 Keene St. in Houston, Texas was built in 1899. It was listed on the National Register of Historic Places in 1985.

It was designed by "prominent Houston architect" William A. McMillen and was, besides McMillen's house at 510 Gray, the only surviving example of his work.

The building is no longer at that address.

In 1997 it was asserted to have been designed by Olle J. Lorehn, instead, and to have been demolished.
