= Houston Negro Hospital School of Nursing Building =

- U.S. National Register of Historic Places
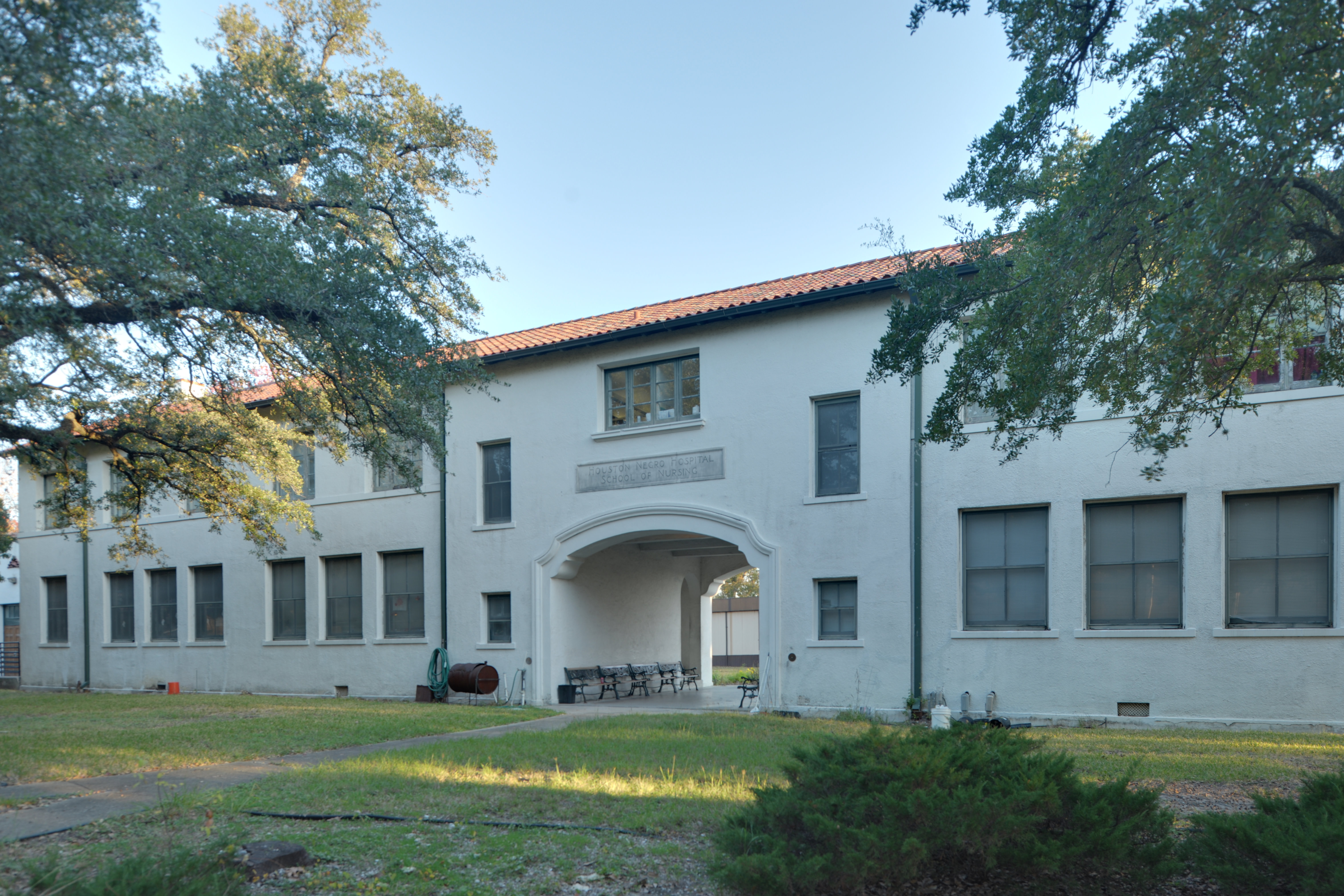
- The School of Nursing building in 2010

- Location within Texas Location within the United States
- Location: Houston Negro Hospital complex Holman Ave. and Ennis St. Houston, Texas
- Coordinates: 29°43′47″N 95°21′42″W
- Area: less than one acre
- Built: 1925–1927
- Architect: Maurice J. Sullivan
- Architectural style: Mission/Spanish Colonial Revival
- NRHP reference No.: 82004857
- Added to NRHP: December 27, 1982

The Houston Negro Hospital School of Nursing Building is a school building at the Houston Negro Hospital complex, now named Riverside General Hospital, located at the intersection of Holman Avenue and Ennis Street in Houston, Harris County, Texas, United States.

The Houston Negro Hospital School of Nursing has the distinction of being the first school in Houston created for the express purpose of training black nurses. The attached medical facility, the first non-profit hospital for Black patients in Houston, provided work for black physicians who were normally barred from admitting patients to segregated Houston hospitals.

== Construction ==
In 1918, Houston philanthropist Joseph S. Cullinan established a fund to erect a fifty-bed hospital. Later, Texas oilman J. S. Cullinan, donated $80,000 to build the Hospital and the City of Houston donated the land.

The Spanish Colonial Revival style building began construction in 1925 and the school was officially opened in 1927. Dedication of the building occurred on June 19, 1926, to coincide with the 61st anniversary of Juneteenth, despite ongoing construction.

The first administrator was I.M. Terrell.

== National Register ==
It was added to the National Register of Historic Places on December 27, 1982.

== See also ==
- Houston Negro Hospital
- National Register of Historic Places listings in Houston, Texas
- National Register of Historic Places listings in Harris County, Texas
