= Allen Parkway =

Arterial road west of Downtown Houston, Texas

- Buffalo Parkway
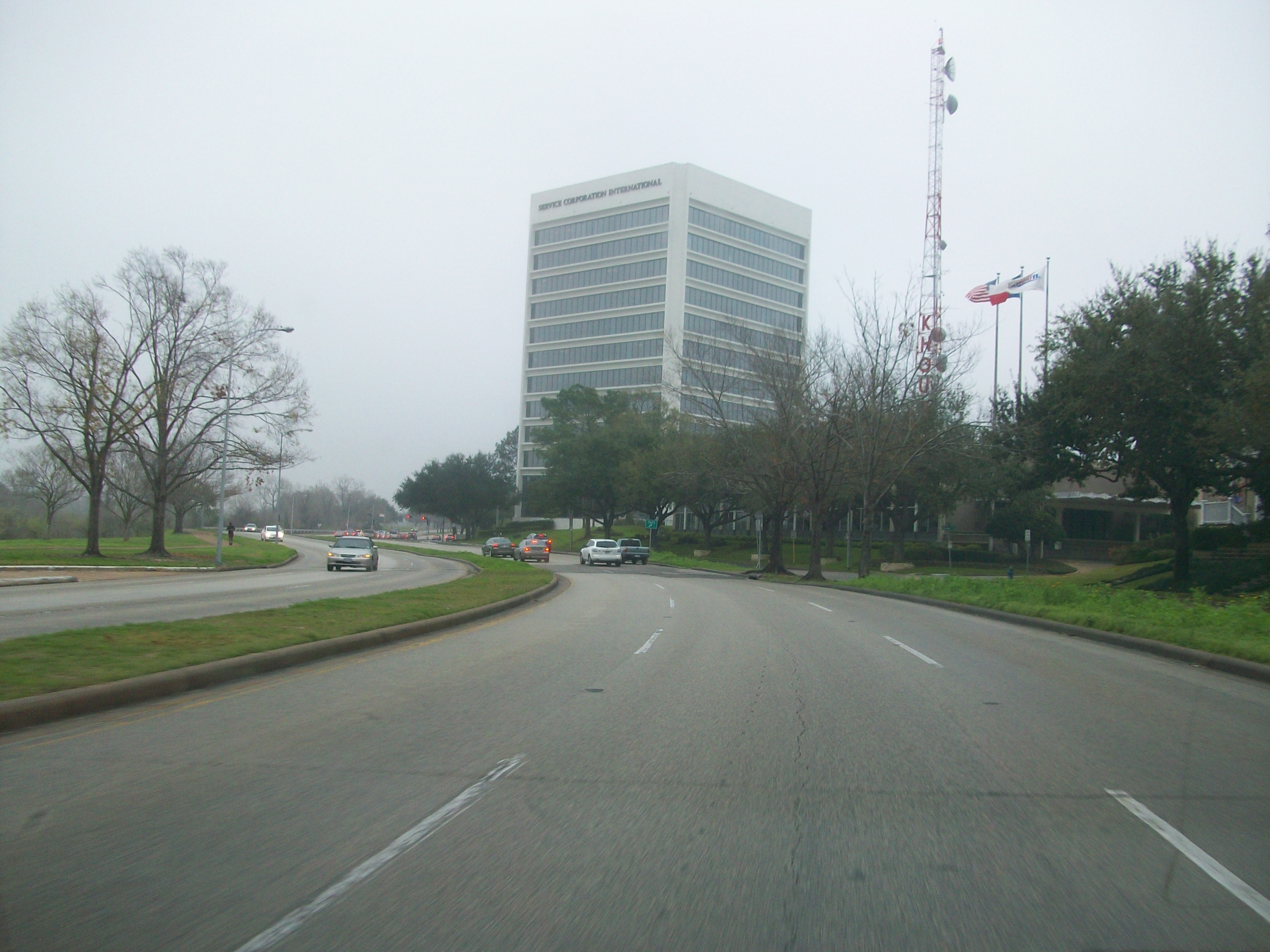
- Length: 2.3 mi (3.7 km)
- Location: Houston, Harris County
- West end: Shepherd Drive
- East end: I-45

Allen Parkway is an arterial road west of Downtown Houston, Texas. It has a distance of approximately 2.3 miles (3.7 km), running from Interstate 45 west to Shepherd Drive, where it becomes Kirby Drive. Originally known as Buffalo Parkway, it was later named after John Kirby Allen and Augustus Chapman Allen, the founders of Houston.

== Location and interchanges ==
The entire length of Allen Parkway is considered a limited-access parkway and closely follows the south bank of Buffalo Bayou. Memorial Drive, another limited-access parkway, closely follows the north bank of the bayou. Allen Parkway passes under Studemont Street/Montrose Boulevard, Waugh Drive, and Shepherd Drive. At the Waugh Drive and Studemont/Montrose interchanges, which have exit and entrance ramps and feeder roads on each side, Allen Parkway is below grade. The south side (eastbound) has continuous feeder roads, the north side (westbound) has discontinuous feeder roads. Access is not controlled at Dunlavy Street, where traffic to or from Allen Parkway can cross the median. A continuous green T-intersection at Taft Street, allowing controlled access for westbound traffic, with a stoplight for eastbound traffic existed prior to 2015 where the conversion of the westbound lanes to parking spaces (east of Montrose Boulevard) eliminated the intersection where the Taft and Gillette Street intersections have traffic signals.

=== Unusual configuration ===
The intersection of Allen Parkway and I-45 was once known as the Spaghetti Bowl because of the numerous curving entrance and exit ramps. Motorists traveling eastbound at the eastern terminus can exit to Clay Street, Dallas Street, I-45 northbound, or I-45 southbound.

The ramp from eastbound Allen Parkway to southbound I-45 was known by long-time Houston residents as one of the most difficult in the Houston area, with a blind merge into the far left lane. However, this ramp was relocated to enter I-45 south from the right as of January 2017.

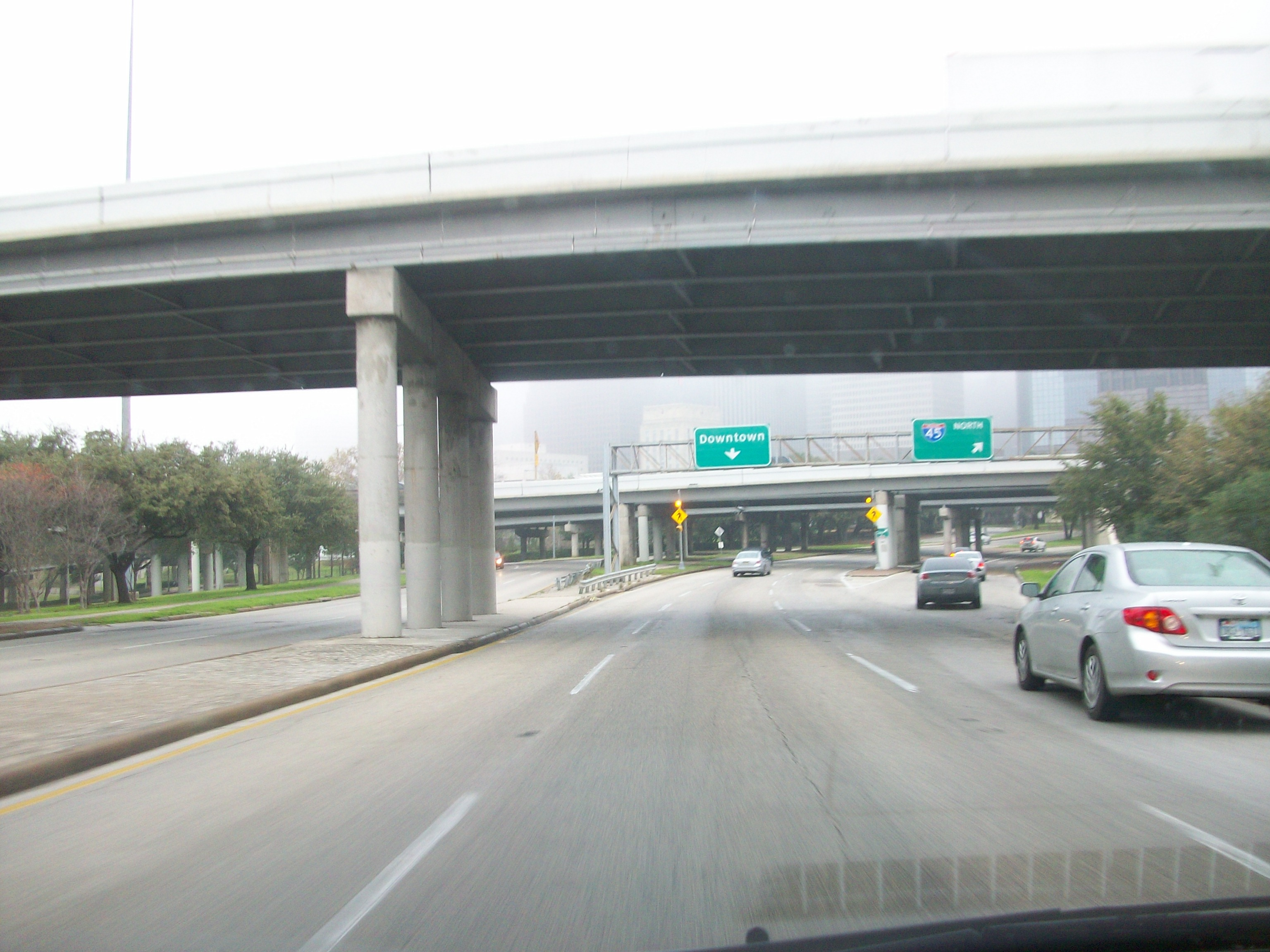
Eastbound, just before the I-45 on-ramp

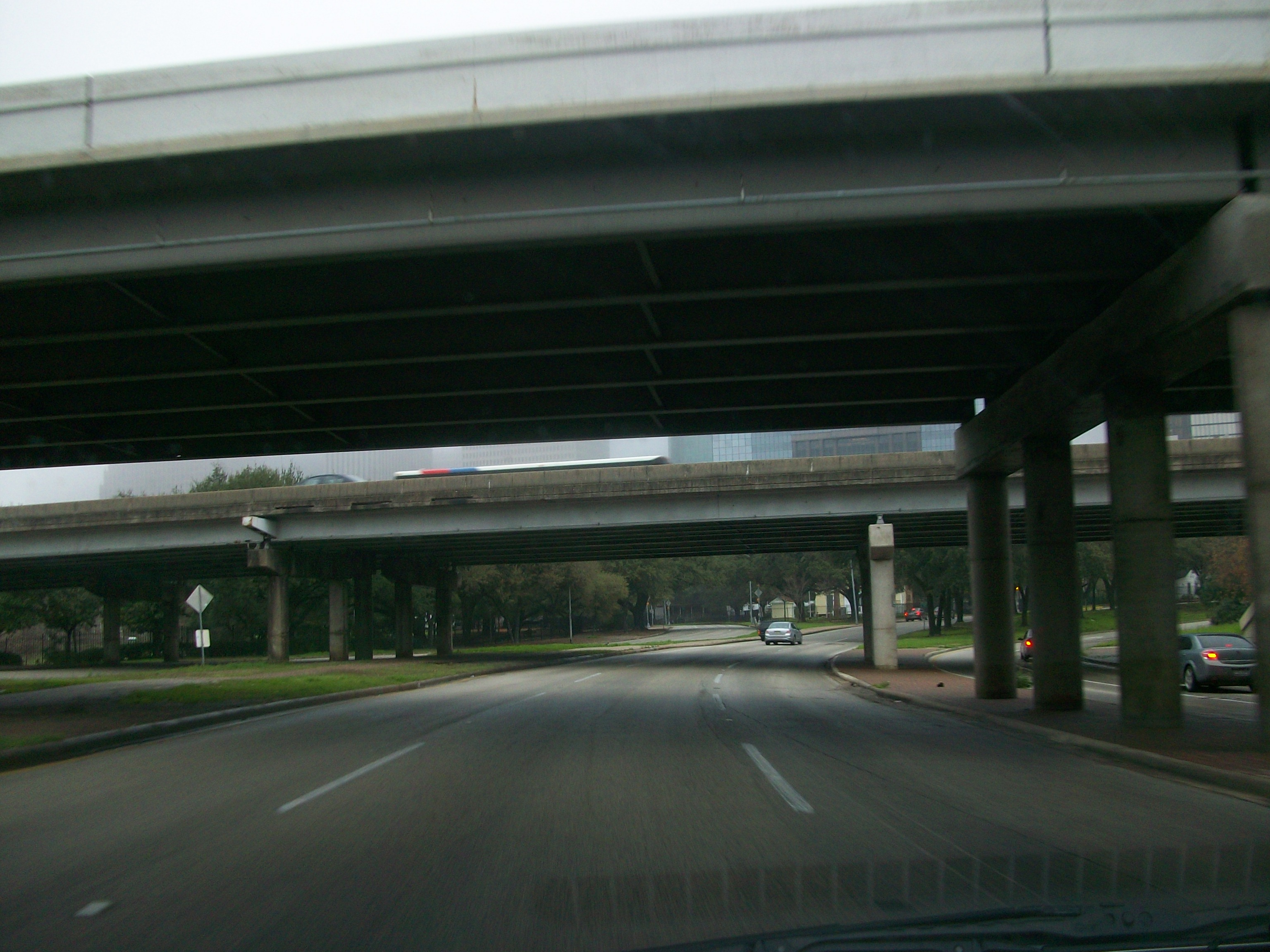
Eastbound, passing under the I-45

Motorists wishing to travel westbound on Allen Parkway can enter via Walker Street, Lamar Street, or by way of an entrance ramp which collects traffic from Sabine Street, and I-45 northbound and southbound. The eastbound feeder ends at West Dallas Street. A portion of the roadway also used to be known as "The Deathtrap" because of an odd number of travel lanes and bridge supports for a railroad positioned in the middle of the road.

In 2015 the City of Houston re-routed Allen Parkway by eliminating the southbound service lane by converting it to eastbound traffic (the existing eastbound traffic now flows west) - as a result the former westbound right of way has been converted into metered parking spaces for access to Eleanor Tinsley/Buffalo Bayou Park. This particular section terminates east of Montrose Boulevard. One oddity of the metered parking spaces is that the meters operate on Sundays - same with the Washington Avenue Parking Management District (Downtown Houston (including those in Midtown) parking meters are not operational on Sundays).

== Traffic ==
Allen Parkway rarely suffers from heavy traffic congestion. At the Montrose Boulevard interchange, the busiest location, there are fewer than 29,000 vehicles per day. Allen Parkway has three main lanes in each direction, except at underpasses. In addition, Allen Parkway ends at the eastern boundary of the River Oaks neighborhood, providing a means for these residents to quickly reach downtown Houston.

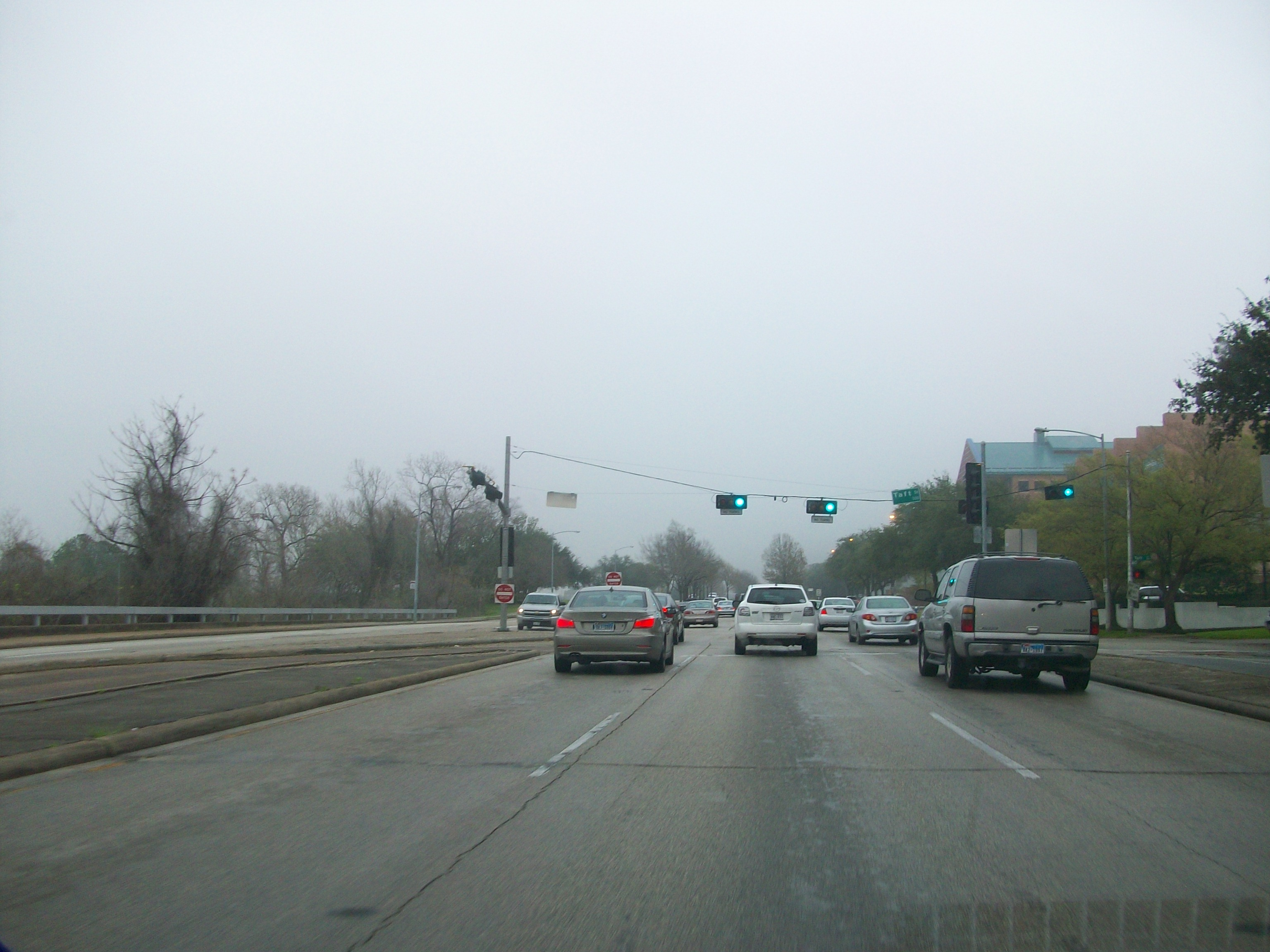
Light traffic

== Flooding ==
Due to its proximity to the flood-prone Buffalo Bayou, the underpasses are subject to flooding during heavy rains and flood gauges can be seen. In June 2001, though, heavy rains from Tropical Storm Allison caused Buffalo Bayou to overtop its banks and flood the entire parkway, in some places, to a depth of eight feet. Even the KHOU television studios, at a slightly higher elevation than Allen Parkway, were flooded. Most of Allen Parkway is more than 30 feet (9 m) above the normal level of Buffalo Bayou. However, the level of the bayou during the storm was more than 30 feet (9.1 m) above normal.

On November 16, 2017, KHOU announced that it would not return to its studios after they were severely damaged by flooding from Hurricane Harvey in August of that year; the building was subsequently sold to an affiliate of Service Corporation International (whose headquarters are located in a building that was adjacent to the studios) and was later demolished. KHOU, which would temporarily share studios with KUHT, subsequently announced plans to relocate its studios to a high-rise building in the Galleria district beginning in early 2019.

== Recreation ==
Allen Parkway forms the entire southern boundary of Buffalo Bayou Park. The parkway also ends just west of Sam Houston Park in downtown. Jogging and bike paths follow Allen Parkway for its entire length, though the trails occasionally dip downwards towards the bayou. The road itself is used as part of the route for the annual Chevron Houston Marathon. There are several rest area exits along the north side of the parkway which provide motorists with access to the park. Concerts are also held on the south side of the bayou, next to Allen Parkway, including the official City of Houston Fourth of July fireworks celebration and concert. Also, the annual Houston Art Car Parade (prior to the 2016 season) is located on the eastern half of Allen Parkway.
