= National Register of Historic Places listings in Houston Heights, Houston, Texas =

This is intended to be a complete list of properties and districts listed on the National Register of Historic Places that are located in the Houston Heights neighborhood of Houston. The "Houston Heights" neighborhood borders are, approximately, Interstate 10 on the South, I-610 on the North, Interstate 45 on the East and Durham on the West.

The locations of National Register properties and districts (at least for all showing latitude and longitude coordinates below) may be seen in a map by clicking on "Map of all coordinates."

Contents: NRHP listings by area in Harris County
downtown Houston - Houston Heights - inner Harris County - outer Harris County

This National Park Service list is complete through NPS recent listings posted May 1, 2026.

== Current listings ==
	Name on the Register	Image	Date listed	Location	City or town	Description
1	All Saints Roman Catholic Church	All Saints Roman Catholic Church	June 22, 1983 (#83004425)	201 E. 10th St. 29°47′21″N 95°23′46″W	Houston	
2	Allbach House	Allbach House	June 22, 1983 (#83004426)	2023 Arlington St. 29°48′18″N 95°23′41″W	Houston	
3	John W. Anderson House	John W. Anderson House	January 15, 1988 (#87002241)	711 Columbia; 29°47′02″N 95°23′36″W	Houston	
4	Banta House	Banta House	June 22, 1983 (#83004427)	119 E. 20th St. 29°48′12″N 95°23′50″W	Houston	
5	Otto H. Baring House	Otto H. Baring House	January 15, 1988 (#87002242)	1030 Rutland; 29°47′23″N 95°24′02″W	Houston	
6	Barker House	Barker House	May 14, 1984 (#84001754)	121 E. 16th St. 29°47′58″N 95°23′49″W	Houston	
7	Borgstrom House	Borgstrom House	May 14, 1984 (#84001755)	1401 Cortlandt St. 29°47′46″N 95°23′44″W	Houston	
8	Burge House	Burge House	June 22, 1983 (#83004430)	1801 Heights Blvd. 29°48′06″N 95°23′54″W	Houston	
9	George L. Burlingame House	George L. Burlingame House	January 15, 1988 (#87002243)	1238 Harvard; 29°47′37″N 95°23′45″W	Houston	
10	Burnett House	Burnett House	August 20, 2004 (#83004671)	219 W. Eleventh St. 29°47′27″N 95°23′59″W	Houston	
11	David A. Carden House	David A. Carden House	July 17, 1990 (#90001048)	718 W. 17th Ave. 29°48′02″N 95°24′39″W	Houston	
12	Moses A. Clanton House	Moses A. Clanton House	July 17, 1990 (#90001040)	1025 Arlington; 29°47′23″N 95°23′39″W	Houston	
13	J. H. Clare House		January 15, 1988 (#87002244)	939 Arlington; 29°47′18″N 95°23′40″W	Houston	
14	Austin Copeland House I		January 15, 1988 (#87002248)	921 Arlington; 29°47′15″N 95°23′39″W	Houston	
15	Austin Copeland House II		January 15, 1988 (#87002245)	925 Arlington; 29°47′16″N 95°23′39″W	Houston	
16	Charles E. Coombs House	Charles E. Coombs House	July 17, 1990 (#90001041)	1037 Columbia; 29°47′25″N 95°23′36″W	Houston	
17	Dr. B. F. Coop House	Dr. B. F. Coop House	May 14, 1984 (#84001757)	1536 Heights Blvd. 29°47′56″N 95°23′51″W	Houston	
18	Countryman House		June 22, 1983 (#83004431)	402 E. 9th St. 29°47′13″N 95°23′38″W	Houston	
19	Cummings House	Cummings House	June 22, 1983 (#83004432)	1418 Heights Blvd. 29°47′47″N 95°23′51″W	Houston	
20	Dexter House		May 14, 1984 (#84001761)	224 W. 17th St. 29°48′02″N 95°23′59″W	Houston	Demolished.
21	Lula J. Doughty House	Lula J. Doughty House	July 17, 1990 (#90001046)	1233 Yale St. 29°47′35″N 95°23′57″W	Houston	
22	Jay L. Durham House	Jay L. Durham House	January 15, 1988 (#87002246)	921 Heights Blvd. 29°47′17″N 95°23′11″W	Houston	
23	Eaton House	Eaton House	June 22, 1983 (#83004433)	510 Harvard St. 29°46′47″N 95°23′45″W	Houston	
24	Elkins House		June 22, 1983 (#83004434)	602 E. 9th St. 29°47′13″N 95°23′30″W	Houston	
25	Dr. Billie V. Ellis House	Dr. Billie V. Ellis House	June 22, 1983 (#83004435)	1515 Heights Blvd. 29°47′54″N 95°23′54″W	Houston	
26	Ezzell House	Ezzell House	May 14, 1984 (#84001762)	1236 Rutland St. 29°47′37″N 95°24′03″W	Houston	
27	William F. Fluegel House	William F. Fluegel House	January 15, 1988 (#87002247)	1327 Ashland; 29°47′45″N 95°24′13″W	Houston	Significantly altered and expanded since initial listing.
28	Gerloff House	Gerloff House	July 17, 1990 (#90001047)	221 E. 12th Ave. 29°47′34″N 95°23′45″W	Houston	
29	Gillette House	Gillette House	May 14, 1984 (#84001764)	301–303 E. 15th St. 29°47′52″N 95°23′43″W	Houston	
30	Hartley House	Hartley House	June 22, 1983 (#83004437)	315 W. 17th St. 29°48′04″N 95°24′08″W	Houston	
31	Hawkins House	Hawkins House	May 14, 1984 (#84001765)	1015 Heights Blvd. 29°47′22″N 95°23′53″W	Houston	
32	Heights Boulevard Esplanade	Heights Boulevard Esplanade	May 14, 1984 (#84001766)	Heights Boulevard from White Oak Bayou to 20th St. 29°46′10″N 95°23′50″W	Houston	
33	Heights Christian Church	Heights Christian Church	June 22, 1983 (#83004438)	1703 Heights Blvd. 29°48′03″N 95°23′54″W	Houston	
34	Heights Theater	Heights Theater	July 24, 2017 (#100001375)	339 W. 19th St. 29°48′11″N 95°24′10″W	Houston	
35	House at 112 W. 4th Street	House at 112 W. 4th Street	May 14, 1984 (#84001771)	112 W. 4th St. 29°46′40″N 95°23′52″W	Houston	
36	House at 122 East Fifth Street	House at 122 East Fifth Street	May 14, 1984 (#84001776)	122 E. 5th St. 29°46′46″N 95°23′47″W	Houston	
37	House at 201 W. 15th Street	House at 201 W. 15th Street	June 22, 1983 (#83004460)	201 W. 15th St. 29°47′51″N 95°23′57″W	Houston	
38	House at 217 E. 5th Street	House at 217 E. 5th Street	May 14, 1984 (#84001786)	217 E. 5th St. 29°46′46″N 95°23′44″W	Houston	
39	House at 402 E. 11th Street	House at 402 E. 11th Street	June 22, 1983 (#83004447)	402 E. 11th Street; 29°47′26″N 95°23′38″W	Houston	
40	House at 444 West 24th Street	House at 444 West 24th Street	May 14, 1984 (#84001788)	444 W. 24th St. 29°48′28″N 95°24′12″W	Houston	
41	House at 505 W. 18th Street	House at 505 W. 18th Street	May 14, 1984 (#84001791)	505 W. 18th St. 29°48′07″N 95°24′22″W	Houston	
42	House at 532 Harvard Street		June 22, 1983 (#83004448)	532 Harvard St. 29°46′51″N 95°23′46″W	Houston	
43	House at 828 Heights Boulevard	House at 828 Heights Boulevard	June 22, 1983 (#83004451)	828 Heights Blvd. 29°47′07″N 95°23′50″W	Houston	
44	House at 844 Columbia Street		June 22, 1983 (#83004445)	844 Columbia St. 29°47′13″N 95°23′34″W	Houston	
45	House at 844 Cortlandt		June 22, 1983 (#83004444)	844 Cortlandt; 29°47′12″N 95°23′42″W	Houston	
46	House at 917 Heights Boulevard	House at 917 Heights Boulevard	May 14, 1984 (#84001793)	917 Heights Blvd. 29°47′14″N 95°23′53″W	Houston	
47	House at 943½ Cortlandt Street		January 7, 1993 (#84003972)	943½ Cortlandt St. 29°47′19″N 95°23′44″W	Houston	
48	Houses at 1217 and 1219 Tulane Street		December 9, 2020 (#100005898)	1217 Tulane St. 29°47′36″N 95°24′09″W	Houston	
49	House at 1227 Rutland Street	House at 1227 Rutland Street	May 14, 1984 (#84001777)	1227 Rutland St. 29°47′35″N 95°24′04″W	Houston	
50	House at 1237 Rutland Street	House at 1237 Rutland Street	June 22, 1983 (#83004456)	1237 Rutland St. 29°47′37″N 95°24′04″W	Houston	
51	House at 1111 Heights Boulevard	House at 1111 Heights Boulevard	May 14, 1984 (#84001768)	1111 Heights Blvd. 29°47′28″N 95°23′53″W	Houston	
52	House at 1210 Harvard Street	House at 1210 Harvard Street	May 14, 1984 (#84001774)	1210 Harvard St. 29°47′34″N 95°23′46″W	Houston	
53	House at 1217 Harvard	House at 1217 Harvard	January 15, 1988 (#87002249)	1217 Harvard; 29°47′35″N 95°23′48″W	Houston	
54	House at 1220 Harvard	House at 1220 Harvard	January 15, 1988 (#87002250)	1220 Harvard; 29°47′35″N 95°23′45″W	Houston	
55	House at 1222 Harvard Street	House at 1222 Harvard Street	July 17, 1990 (#90001043)	1222 Harvard St. 29°47′35″N 95°23′45″W	Houston	
56	House at 1230 Oxford Street	House at 1230 Oxford Street	May 14, 1984 (#84001780)	1230 Oxford St. 29°47′37″N 95°23′32″W	Houston	
57	House at 1304 Cortlandt Street	House at 1304 Cortlandt Street	May 14, 1984 (#84001784)	1304 Cortlandt St. 29°47′41″N 95°23′42″W	Houston	
58	House at 1343 Allston Street	House at 1343 Allston Street	June 22, 1983 (#83004443)	1343 Allston St. 29°47′46″N 95°24′01″W	Houston	Significantly altered and expanded since initial listing.
59	House at 1421 Harvard St.	House at 1421 Harvard St.	June 22, 1983 (#83004449)	1421 Harvard St. 29°47′48″N 95°23′48″W	Houston	
60	House at 1421 Heights Boulevard	House at 1421 Heights Boulevard	June 22, 1983 (#83004452)	1421 Heights Blvd. 29°47′49″N 95°23′54″W	Houston	
61	House at 1435 Heights Boulevard	House at 1435 Heights Boulevard	January 15, 1988 (#87002251)	1435 Heights Blvd. 29°47′50″N 95°23′53″W	Houston	
62	House at 1437 Waverly Street	House at 1437 Waverly Street	June 22, 1983 (#83004458)	1437 Waverly St. 29°47′49″N 95°24′16″W	Houston	
63	House at 1437 Heights Boulevard	House at 1437 Heights Boulevard	June 22, 1983 (#83004453)	1437 Heights Blvd. 29°47′50″N 95°23′54″W	Houston	
64	House at 1443 Allston Street	House at 1443 Allston Street	June 22, 1983 (#83004442)	1443 Allston St. 29°47′52″N 95°24′02″W	Houston	
65	House at 1509 Allston Street	House at 1509 Allston Street	June 22, 1983 (#83004441)	1509 Allston St. 29°47′55″N 95°24′02″W	Houston	
66	House at 1515 Allston Street	House at 1515 Allston Street	June 22, 1983 (#83004440)	1515 Allston St. 29°47′55″N 95°24′02″W	Houston	
67	House at 1517 Cortland Street		June 22, 1983 (#83004446)	1517 Cortland St. 29°47′56″N 95°23′45″W	Houston	
68	House at 1537 Tulane Street	House at 1537 Tulane Street	June 22, 1983 (#83004457)	1537 Tulane Street; 29°47′56″N 95°24′08″W	Houston	
69	House at 1640 Harvard Street	House at 1640 Harvard Street	June 22, 1983 (#83004450)	1640 Harvard St. 29°48′05″N 95°23′47″W	Houston	House modified and expanded significantly since initial listing.
70	House at 2035 Rutland Street	House at 2035 Rutland Street	June 22, 1983 (#83004455)	2035 Rutland St. 29°48′17″N 95°24′06″W	Houston	
71	House at 1421–1423 Waverly Street	House at 1421–1423 Waverly Street	June 22, 1983 (#83004459)	1421–1423 Waverly St. 29°47′47″N 95°24′16″W	Houston	
72	House at 2402 Rutland Street	House at 2402 Rutland Street	June 22, 1983 (#83004454)	2402 Rutland St. 29°48′29″N 95°24′05″W	Houston	
73	Houston Public Library	Houston Public Library	May 14, 1984 (#84001795)	1302 Heights Blvd. 29°47′39″N 95°23′51″W	Houston	
74	Houston Heights Fire Station	Houston Heights Fire Station	June 22, 1983 (#83004461)	Yale and 12th Sts. 29°47′33″N 95°23′56″W	Houston	
75	Houston Heights Waterworks Reservoir	Houston Heights Waterworks Reservoir	June 22, 1983 (#83004462)	W. 20 and Nicolson Sts. 29°48′15″N 95°24′23″W	Houston	
76	Houston Heights Woman's Club	Houston Heights Woman's Club	June 22, 1983 (#83004463)	1846 Harvard St; 29°48′13″N 95°23′47″W	Houston	
77	Immanuel Lutheran Church	Immanuel Lutheran Church	June 22, 1983 (#83004464)	1448 Cortlandt St. 29°47′52″N 95°23′42″W	Houston	
78	Isbell House	Isbell House	June 22, 1983 (#83004465)	639 Heights Blvd. 29°46′56″N 95°23′52″W	Houston	
79	James L. Jensen House		July 17, 1990 (#90001039)	721 Arlington; 29°47′03″N 95°23′39″W	Houston	
80	Jones House		June 22, 1983 (#83004466)	1115–1117 Allston St. 29°47′29″N 95°24′02″W	Houston	
81	Keller House	Keller House	May 14, 1984 (#84001797)	1448 Heights Blvd. 29°47′51″N 95°23′51″W	Houston	
82	Marshall W. Kennedy House	Marshall W. Kennedy House	January 15, 1988 (#87002252)	1122 Harvard; 29°47′28″N 95°23′45″W	Houston	
83	Kleinhaus House		June 22, 1983 (#83004467)	803 Yale St. 29°47′07″N 95°23′57″W	Houston	
84	Knittel House	Knittel House	June 22, 1983 (#83004468)	1601 Ashland St. 29°47′59″N 95°24′10″W	Houston	
85	Kronenberger House	Kronenberger House	June 22, 1983 (#83004469)	612 W. 26th St. 29°48′34″N 95°24′18″W	Houston	
86	Emil Lindenburg House	Emil Lindenburg House	January 15, 1988 (#87002253)	1445 Harvard; 29°47′52″N 95°23′48″W	Houston	
87	Fayette C. Lowry House	Fayette C. Lowry House	July 19, 1990 (#90001045)	2009 Harvard; 29°48′16″N 95°23′49″W	Houston	
88	Lund House	Lund House	June 22, 1983 (#83004470)	301 E. 5th St. 29°46′46″N 95°23′42″W	Houston	
89	Mansfield House	Mansfield House	June 22, 1983 (#83004472)	1802 Harvard St. 29°48′06″N 95°23′47″W	Houston	
90	Henry Hicks McCain House		January 15, 1988 (#87002254)	1026 Allston; 29°47′23″N 95°23′59″W	Houston	
91	D. C. McCollum House	D. C. McCollum House	July 17, 1990 (#90001049)	433 W. 24th St. 29°48′29″N 95°24′16″W	Houston	
92	McDonald House		June 22, 1983 (#83004473)	1801 Ashland St. 29°48′06″N 95°24′10″W	Houston	Demolished
93	Meitzen House		May 14, 1984 (#84001813)	725 Harvard St. 29°47′04″N 95°23′48″W	Houston	
94	Miller House	Miller House	May 14, 1984 (#84001814)	1245 Yale St. 29°47′37″N 95°23′57″W	Houston	
95	John Milroy House	John Milroy House	November 12, 1980 (#80004131)	1102 Heights Blvd. 29°47′28″N 95°23′50″W	Houston	Second duplicate listing approved in 1983 (#83004474).
96	Milroy-Muller House	Milroy-Muller House	May 14, 1984 (#84001816)	1602 Harvard St. 29°47′59″N 95°23′46″W	Houston	
97	Glenn W. Morris House	Glenn W. Morris House	July 17, 1990 (#90001044)	1611 Harvard St. 29°48′01″N 95°23′49″W	Houston	
98	Morton Brothers Grocery	Morton Brothers Grocery	January 15, 1988 (#87002255)	401 W. Ninth; 29°47′13″N 95°24′04″W	Houston	
99	Mulcahy House	Mulcahy House	May 14, 1984 (#84001819)	1046 Harvard St. 29°47′26″N 95°23′46″W	Houston	
100	Forrest A. Nairn House	Forrest A. Nairn House	November 12, 1991 (#87002256)	1148 Heights Blvd. 29°47′33″N 95°23′51″W	Houston	
101	Joseph Ogle House		June 22, 1983 (#83004475)	530 Harvard St. 29°46′50″N 95°23′46″W	Houston	
102	Oriental Textile Mill	Oriental Textile Mill	June 22, 1983 (#83004476)	2201 Lawrence St. 29°48′22″N 95°24′30″W	Houston	
103	Otto House	Otto House	May 14, 1984 (#84001820)	835 Rutland St. 29°47′09″N 95°24′03″W	Houston	
104	Perry-Swilley House	Perry-Swilley House	June 22, 1983 (#83004477)	1101 Heights Blvd. 29°47′28″N 95°23′53″W	Houston	
105	Thomas B. Reed House	Thomas B. Reed House	July 17, 1990 (#90001038)	933 Allston St. 29°47′17″N 95°24′01″W	Houston	
106	Charles Roessler House		January 15, 1988 (#87002257)	736 Cortland; 29°47′05″N 95°23′42″W	Houston	
107	Ghent W. Rogers House	Ghent W. Rogers House	July 17, 1990 (#90001042)	1150 Cortlandt; 29°47′33″N 95°23′42″W	Houston	
108	St. Mark's Methodist Church		July 7, 2022 (#100007914)	600 Pecore St. 29°47′26″N 95°22′40″W	Houston	
109	Schlesser-Burrows House	Schlesser-Burrows House	May 14, 1984 (#84001823)	1123 Harvard St. 29°47′30″N 95°23′48″W	Houston	
110	John H. Shoaf House	John H. Shoaf House	January 15, 1988 (#87002258)	2030 Arlington; 29°48′19″N 95°23′39″W	Houston	
111	Swift & Company Packing Plant		March 2, 2026 (#100012775)	612 Waverly Street; 29°46′59″N 95°24′16″W	Houston	
112	Dr. Penn B. Thornton House	Dr. Penn B. Thornton House	June 22, 1983 (#83004480)	1541 Tulane St. 29°47′57″N 95°24′08″W	Houston	
113	Upchurch House	Upchurch House	June 22, 1983 (#83004482)	301 E. 14th St. 29°47′45″N 95°23′43″W	Houston	
114	Ward House	Ward House	June 22, 1983 (#83004483)	323 W. 17th St. 29°48′01″N 95°24′04″W	Houston	
115	Webber House	Webber House	May 14, 1984 (#84001829)	1011 Heights Blvd. 29°47′26″N 95°23′53″W	Houston	
116	Samuel H. Webber House		June 22, 1983 (#83004484)	407 Heights Blvd. 29°46′42″N 95°23′52″W	Houston	
117	Wilkins House	Wilkins House	May 14, 1984 (#84001831)	1541 Ashland St. 29°47′57″N 95°24′12″W	Houston	
118	Williams-Brueder House	Williams-Brueder House	June 22, 1983 (#83004485)	245 W. 18th St. 29°48′08″N 95°24′04″W	Houston	
119	Wilson House	Wilson House	May 14, 1984 (#84001841)	1206 Cortlandt St. 29°47′34″N 95°23′42″W	Houston	
120	Wimberly House	Wimberly House	May 14, 1984 (#84001843)	703 Harvard St. 29°46′28″N 95°23′46″W	Houston	
121	Wisnoski House	Wisnoski House	May 14, 1984 (#84001844)	1651 Columbia St. 29°47′59″N 95°23′36″W	Houston	
122	Woodard House	Woodard House	May 14, 1984 (#84001847)	740 Rutland St. 29°47′04″N 95°24′02″W	Houston	
123	Woodward House	Woodward House	June 22, 1983 (#83004486)	1605 Heights Blvd. 29°48′01″N 95°23′54″W	Houston	
124	Yale Street Bridge over White Oak Bayou	Yale Street Bridge over White Oak Bayou	December 30, 2011 (#11000981)	Yale St. at White Oak Bayou; 29°46′32″N 95°23′55″W	Houston	

== Former listings ==
	Name on the Register	Image	Date listed	Date removed	Location	City or town	Description
1	Building at 430 Harvard Street		June 22, 1983 (#83004429)	October 22, 1992	430 Harvard St. 29°46′44″N 95°23′45″W	Houston	Also known as the Heights Telephone Company Building. Demolished in 1992.
2	Schauer Filling Station		June 22, 1983 (#83004478)	June 14, 2017	1400 Oxford St. 29°47′46″N 95°23′32″W	Houston	Demolished in June, 2013.
