= Gillette House =

Gillette House may refer to:

- Francis Gillette House, Bloomfield, Connecticut, listed on the NRHP in Hartford County, Connecticut
- Guy M. and Rose (Freeman) Gillette House, Cherokee, Iowa, listed on the NRHP in Cherokee County, Iowa
- Callaway-Gillette House, Cuero, Texas, listed on the NRHP in DeWitt County, Texas
- Gillette House (Houston, Texas), NRHP-listed

== See also ==
- Edwards-Gillette Barn, Cambridge, Idaho, listed on the NRHP in Washington County, Idaho
