= John W. Anderson House =

Historic house in Texas, United States

- U.S. National Register of Historic Places
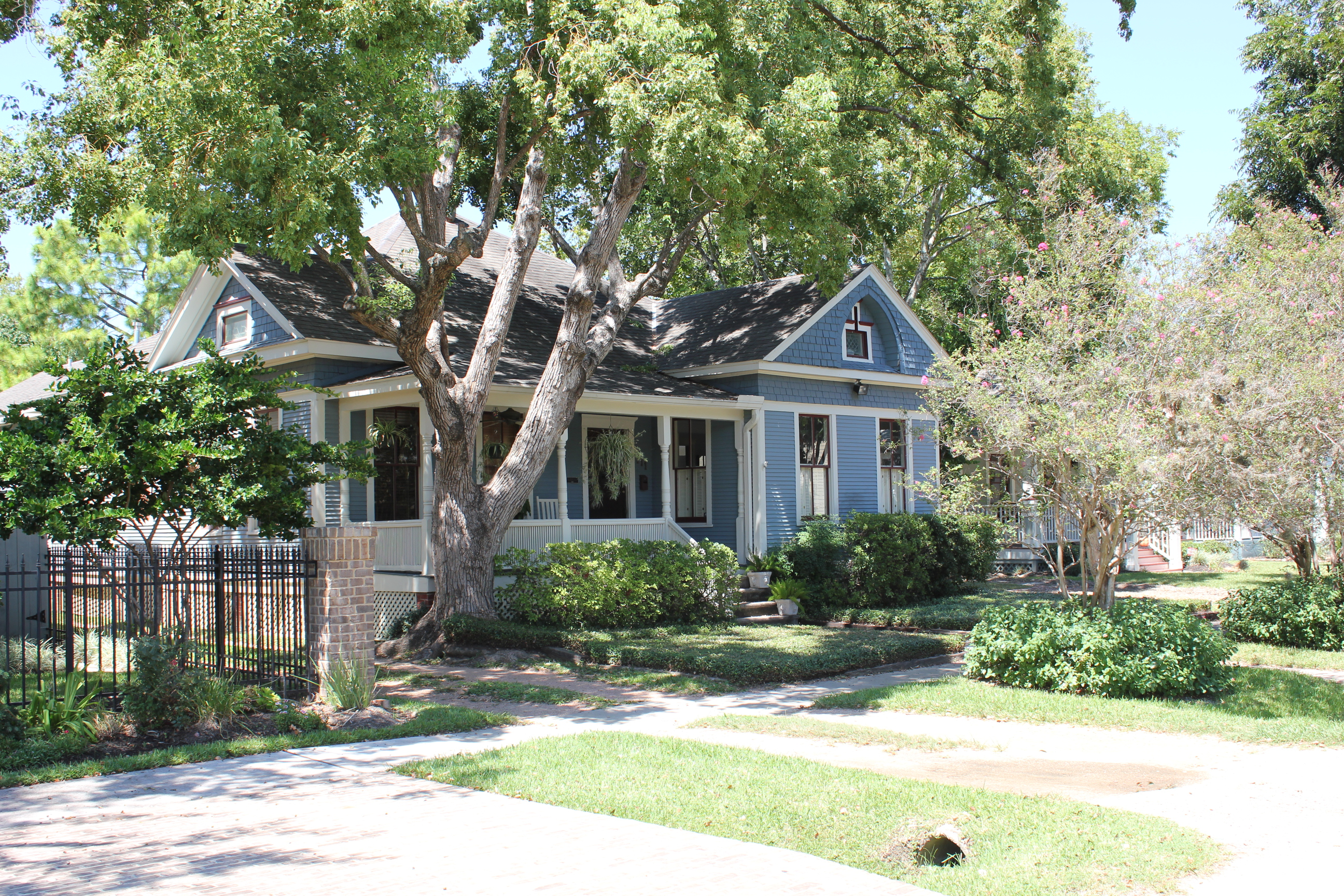

- Location within Texas Location within the United States
- Location: 711 Columbia, Houston, Texas
- Coordinates: 29°47′1″N 95°23′34″W
- Area: less than one acre
- Built: 1907
- MPS: Houston Heights MRA
- NRHP reference No.: 87002241
- Added to NRHP: January 15, 1988

The John W. Anderson House is a house located in Houston, Texas listed on the National Register of Historic Places. Built in 1907, the house is classified as a Queen Anne style cottage.

== See also ==
- National Register of Historic Places listings in Harris County, Texas
