= Banta House =

Historic house in Texas, United States

- U.S. National Register of Historic Places
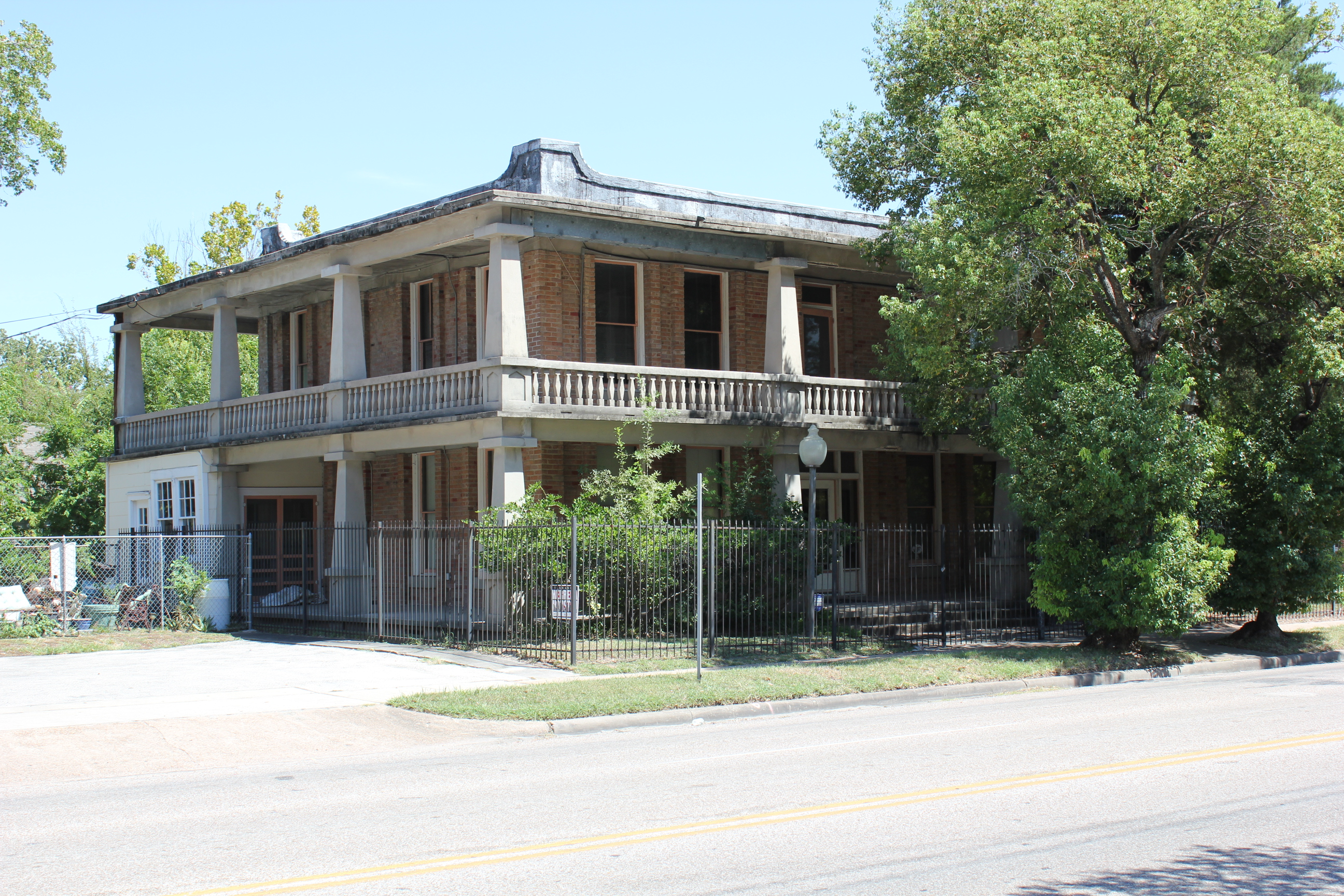

- Location within Texas Location within the United States
- Location: 119 E. 20th St., Houston, Texas
- Coordinates: 29°48′12″N 95°23′50″W
- Area: less than one acre
- Built: 1918
- Architect: Banta, J.E.
- Architectural style: Bungalow/craftsman
- MPS: Houston Heights MRA
- NRHP reference No.: 83004427
- Added to NRHP: June 22, 1983

The Banta House is a house located in Houston, Texas listed on the National Register of Historic Places. The house is a unique variation of the Bungaloid influence within the historic Houston Heights district, with an unusual brick-over-concrete with double gallery supported by tapering square portico.

== See also ==
- National Register of Historic Places listings in Harris County, Texas
