= Borgstrom House =

Historic house in Texas, United States

- U.S. National Register of Historic Places
- Landmark of the City of Houston
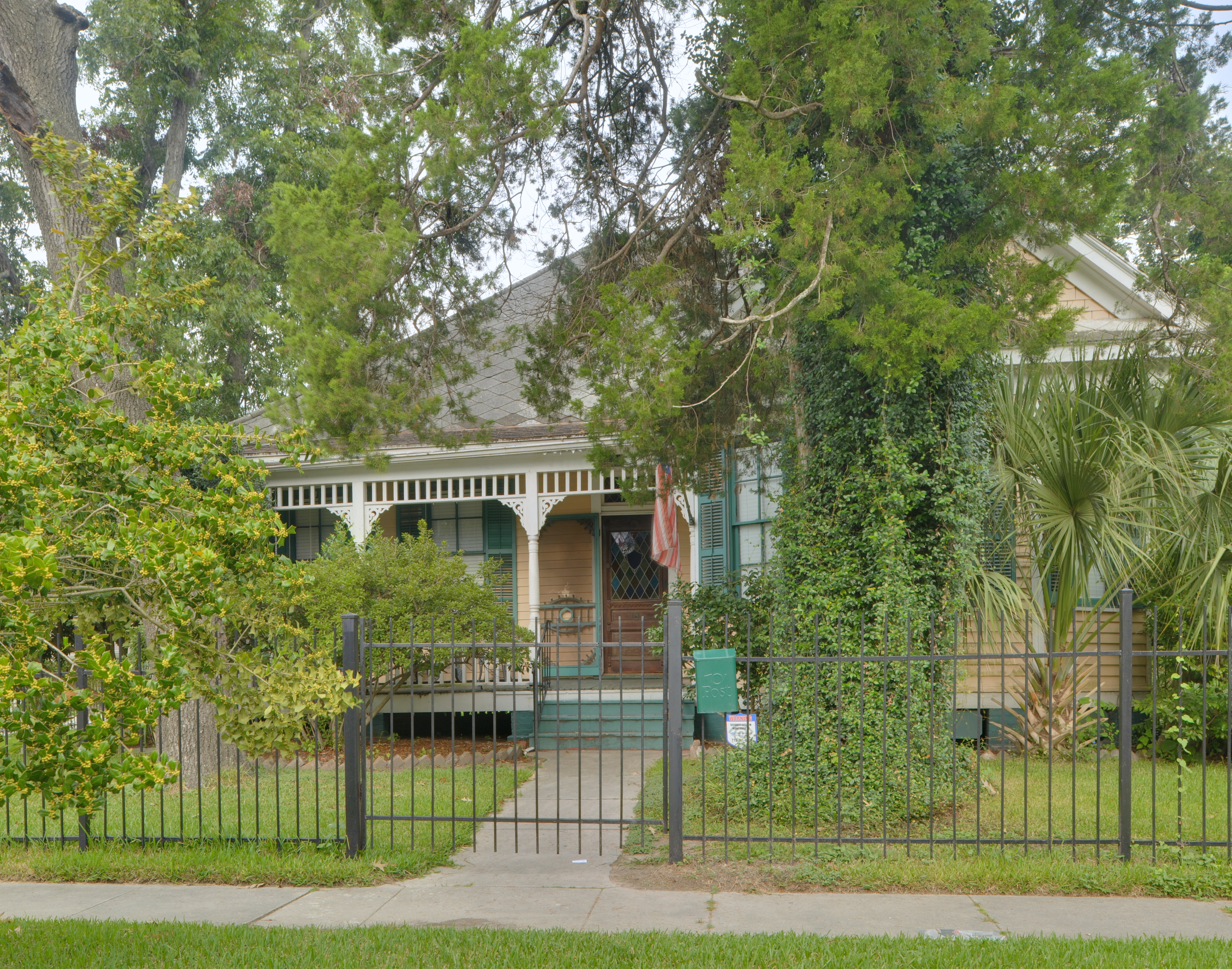
- The Borgstrom House in 2010

- Location within Texas Location within the United States
- Location: 1401 Cortlandt St. Houston, Texas
- Coordinates: 29°47′49″N 95°23′44″W
- Built: 1902
- Architect: Gustaf M. Borgstrom
- Architectural style: Stick/Eastlake Queen Anne
- MPS: Houston Heights MRA (64000847)
- NRHP reference No.: 84001755

Significant dates
- Added to NRHP: 14 May 1984
- Designated LCH: 3 January 2007

The Borgstrom House is a historic house located at 1401 Cortland Street in Houston, Texas. It was listed on the National Register of Historic Places (NRHP) on 14 May 1984. It is within the boundaries of the Houston Heights MRA (Multiple Resource Area) designated by the NRHP June 22, 1983.

== History ==
The house was built in 1902 by Gustaf M. Borgstrom, a tailor by trade, for his family. It is an unusually well preserved example of the early cottages built in Houston Heights. Incorporated as a city in 1896 Houston Heights was the earliest and largest fully planned community in Texas. It was developed in 1891 by the Omaha and South Texas Land Company. Residents voted for the city to be annexed by Houston in 1919. Situated on a large corner lot landscaped with a hedge, bushes, trees and a grass lawn, as of 1980 it was occupied by his daughter-in-law. The Houston Archaeological and Historical Commission voted unanimously to begin the process of permanent designation as a landmark on 24 August 2006. This designation became effective on 3 January 2007. As of 9 August 2010 the Borgstrom House is a designated Landmark of the City of Houston within the Houston Heights Historic District East and is subject to the city's Historic Preservation Ordinance.

== Building ==
The architectural style is listed as Stick/Eastlake Queen Anne. The one story cottage has an L-shaped plan with projecting gable end bay. Construction is wood frame with clapboard siding on brick piers. The hip roof is built of diamond shaped composite shingles with square and fishtail shingles on the gable. An attached porch has turned posts, friezes and balustrades with square members. All windows have shutters. The building's historic significance is as an example of the architecture typical of cottages built in the early development of the Houston Heights. As of 2006 the building was being maintained as a historic home by the owners and had not been inappropriately modified.

== See also ==
- National Register of Historic Places listings in Houston Heights, Houston, Texas
