= Barker House (Houston) =

Historic house in Texas, United States

- U.S. National Register of Historic Places
- Recorded Texas Historic Landmark
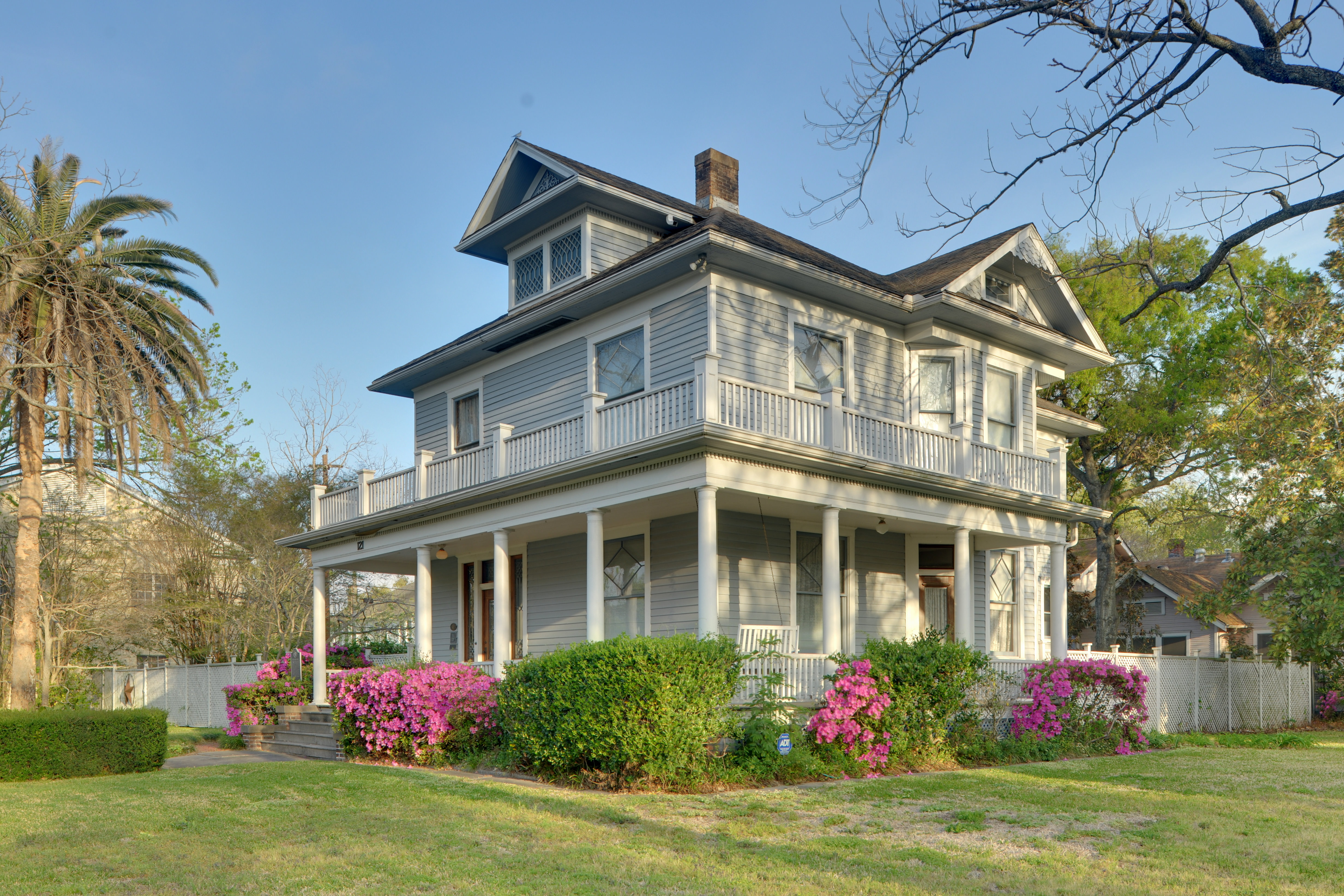
- The house's exterior in 2011

- Location within Texas Location within the United States
- Location: 121 E. 16th St., Houston, Texas
- Coordinates: 29°47′58″N 95°23′49″W
- Area: less than 1 acre (0.40 ha)
- Built: 1908
- Architectural style: Colonial Revival
- MPS: Houston Heights MRA (64000847)
- NRHP reference No.: 84001754
- RTHL No.: 10603

Significant dates
- Added to NRHP: 14 May 1984
- Designated RTHL: 1990

The Barker House or David Barker House is a historic house located in Houston, Texas It was listed on the National Register of Historic Places on 14 May 1984 and designated a Recorded Texas Historic Landmark in 1990.

== History ==
The house was built c. 1908 as part of the Houston Heights neighborhood. It became the home of the Mayor of Houston Heights, David Barker in 1910. Barker was very active in civic affairs adding to six years as Mayor of Houston Heights, with eight years serving the city of Houston and another eight years for Harris county. He advocated for good paved roads, assisted in property acquisition for and construction of schools, continuing to appraise school properties on a pro bono basis after retiring. Houston Heights passed a dry ordinance during Barker's tenure as mayor in 1912, eight years before Prohibition, which remains in effect. The historical significance of the house is due to its association with Barker.

== Building ==
The two story, square, wood frame, clapboard house is located at 121 East 16th Street at the corner with Harvard Street. The house is built on brick piers with latticework between them. The hip roof has a central dormer and an attached porch wraps the south and east sides. The upper porch is supported by Doric or Tuscan columns, both porches have square balusters the upper being uncovered. Entry is via a single door with sidelights and transom light all with tracery. Windows are large with 1 over 1 lights originally, the uppers have been replaced with diamond shaped multiple pane lights in 1919. A patio added later is concealed by a latticework fence.

== See also ==
- National Register of Historic Places listings in Harris County, Texas
