= Morton Brothers Grocery =

- U.S. National Register of Historic Places
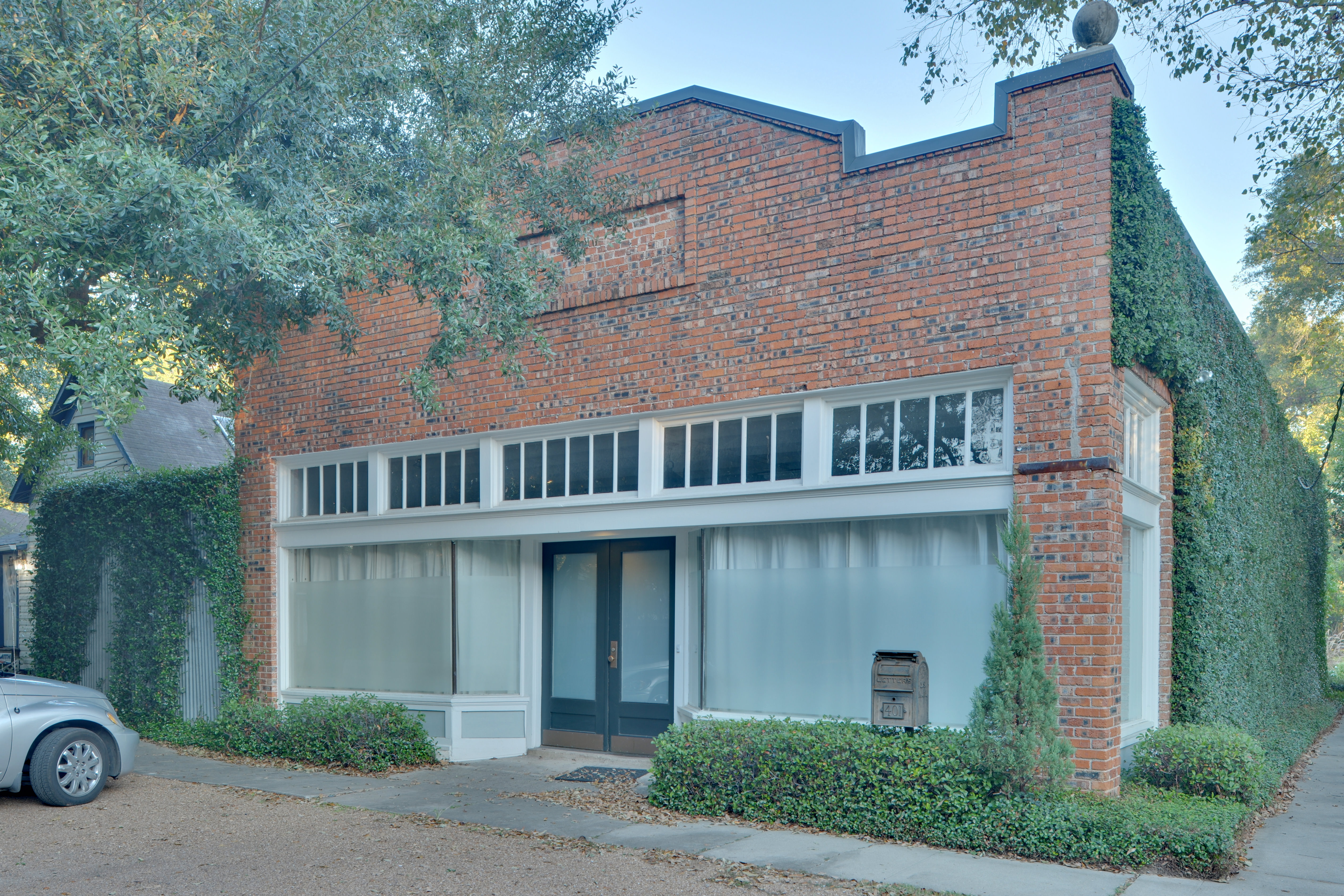
- The building's exterior in 2010

- Location within Texas Location within the United States
- Location: 401 W. Ninth, Houston, Texas
- Coordinates: 29°47′13″N 95°24′4″W
- Area: less than one acre
- Built: 1929
- MPS: Houston Heights MRA
- NRHP reference No.: 87002255
- Added to NRHP: January 15, 1988

The Morton Brothers Grocery, located at 401 West Ninth in Houston, Texas, is a historic building located in the Houston Heights neighborhood.

Built in 1929, it was a neighborhood grocery store run by Curtis Ira Morton (born 22 Jan 1866 in Tippecanoe, Indiana, USA) and his brother, William J. Morton until 1949. During a break-in and robbery, Curtis Morton was mortally wounded and died in 1949. His three daughters, Sue Morton Jenkins, Catherine Morton, and Bonnie Morton Gillis, survived him. His wife, Zora Price Chissom Morton predeceased him.

It is a one-story brick veneer commercial building, one of the few such remaining in the Heights. Its most recent use has been as a private home. It was listed on the National Register of Historic Places on January 15, 1988.

== See also ==
- National Register of Historic Places listings in Harris County, Texas
