= Otto H. Baring House =

Historic house in Texas, United States

- U.S. National Register of Historic Places
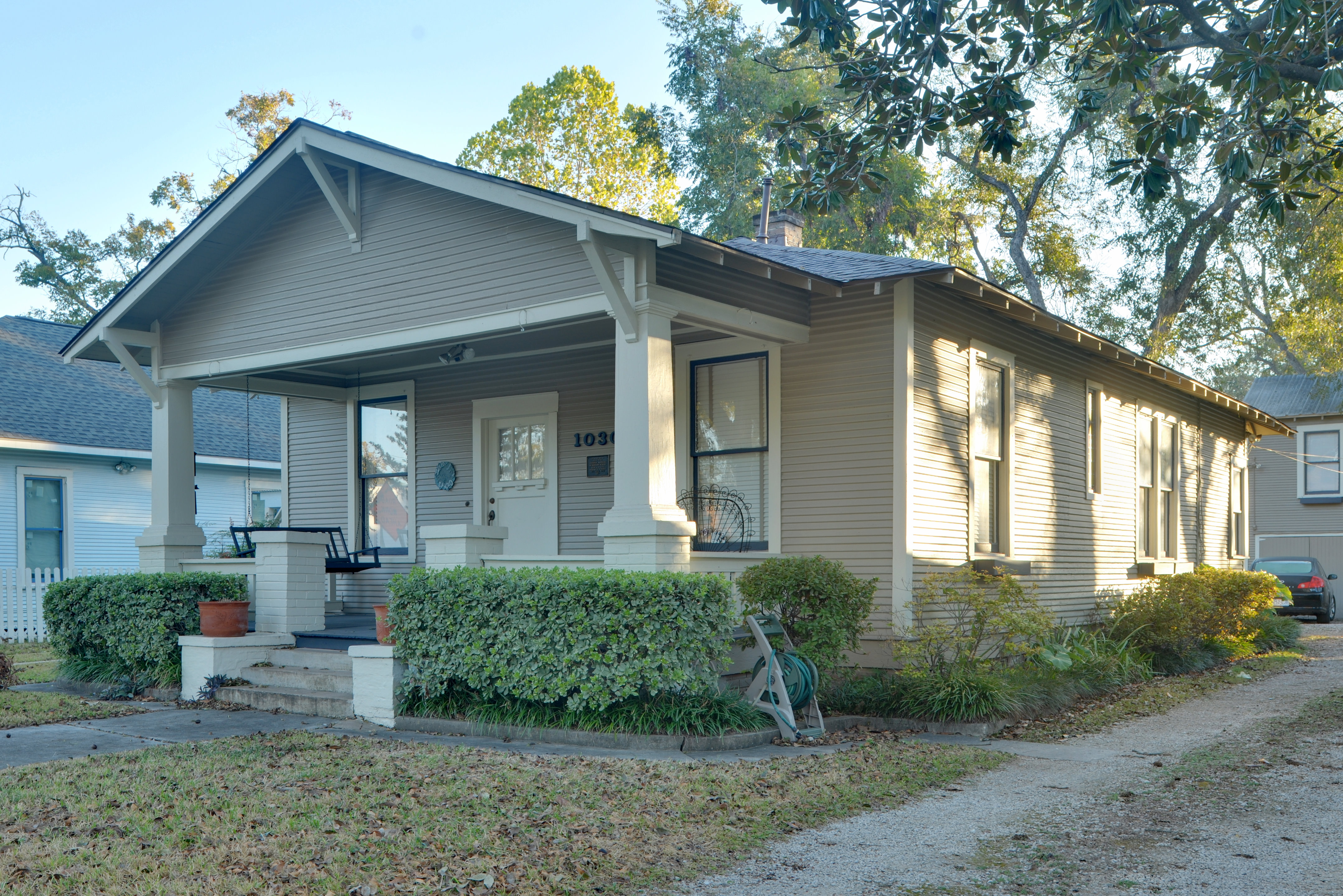

- Location within Texas Location within the United States
- Location: 1030 Rutland, Houston, Texas
- Coordinates: 29°47′23″N 95°24′2″W
- Area: less than one acre
- Built: 1921
- Built by: Baring, Otto H.
- Architectural style: Bungalow/American Craftsman
- MPS: Houston Heights MRA
- NRHP reference No.: 87002242
- Added to NRHP: January 15, 1988

The Otto H. Baring House is a house of the Bungalow/American Craftsman style located in Houston, Texas. It was listed on the National Register of Historic Places in 1988.

== See also ==
- National Register of Historic Places listings in Harris County, Texas
