= Oriental Textile Mill =

- U.S. National Register of Historic Places
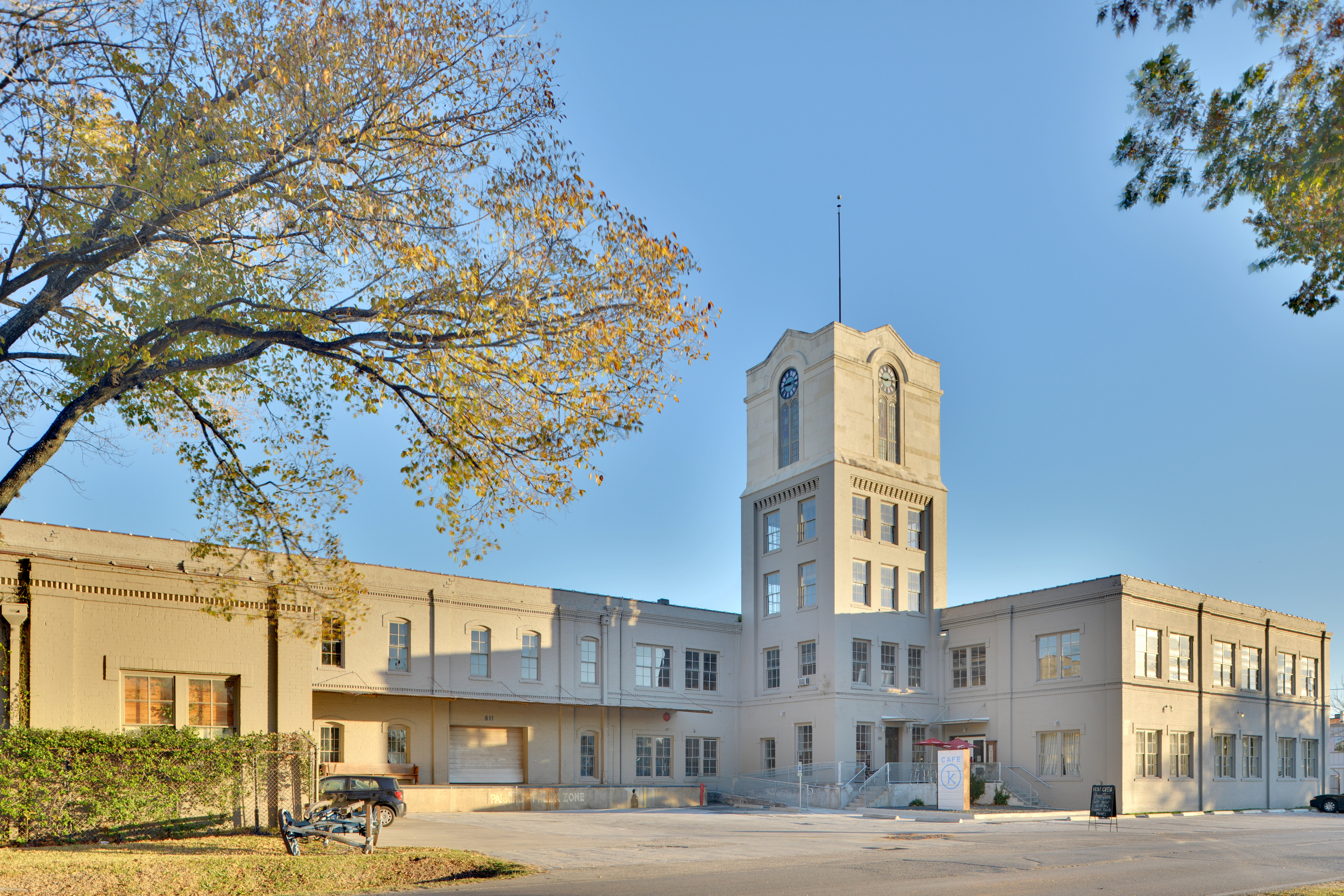
- The building's exterior in 2012

- Location within Texas Location within the United States
- Location: 2201 Lawrence St., Houston, Texas
- Coordinates: 29°48′21.9″N 95°24′30.5″W
- Area: 1.9 acres (0.77 ha)
- Built: 1893
- MPS: Houston Heights MRA
- NRHP reference No.: 83004476
- Added to NRHP: June 22, 1983

The Oriental Textile Mill, located at 2201 Lawrence Street in the Houston Heights neighborhood of Houston, Texas, was listed on the National Register of Historic Places on June 22, 1983.

The mill is a complex of brick industrial buildings, with a four-story clock tower as its most distinguishing feature. Originally built in 1893 for a mattress manufacturing company, the site has seen several uses, including a textile mill, fiberglass manufacturing, a bakery, and mixed use small businesses and live/work spaces. It was one of the first industrial complexes in Houston Heights, and is the last remaining.

== See also ==
- National Register of Historic Places listings in Harris County, Texas
