= Houston Heights Waterworks Reservoir =

- U.S. National Register of Historic Places
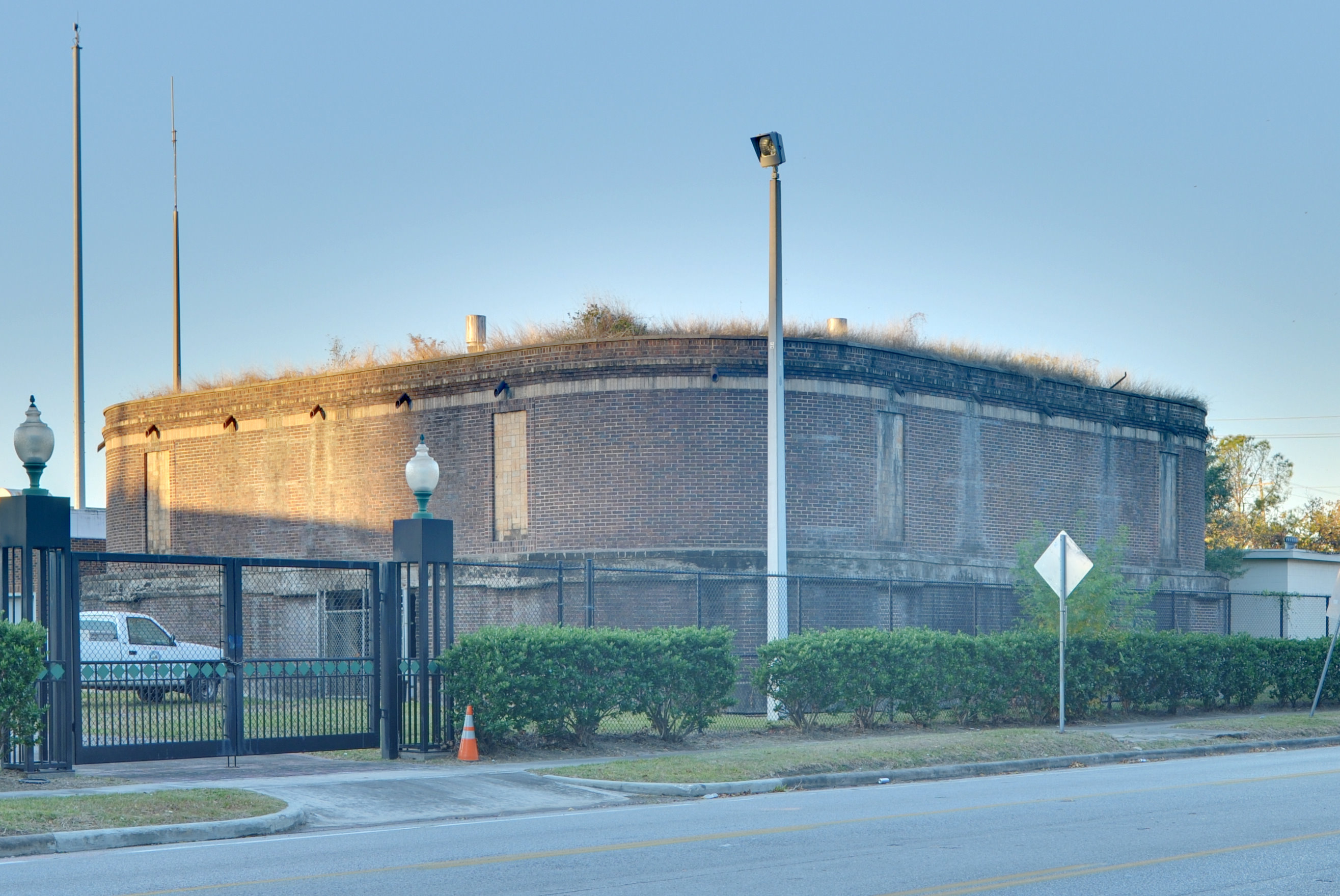
- The reservoir in 2010

- Location within Texas Location within the United States
- Location: W. 20 and Nicolson Sts., Houston, Texas
- Coordinates: 29°48′15″N 95°24′23″W
- Area: 1 acre (0.40 ha)
- Built: 1893
- MPS: Houston Heights MRA
- NRHP reference No.: 83004462
- Added to NRHP: June 22, 1983

The Houston Heights Waterworks Reservoir, located at West 20th Street and Nicolson Street in Houston, Texas, was listed on the National Register of Historic Places on June 22, 1983.

== See also ==
- National Register of Historic Places listings in Harris County, Texas
