= Isbell House =

Historic house in Texas, United States

- U.S. National Register of Historic Places
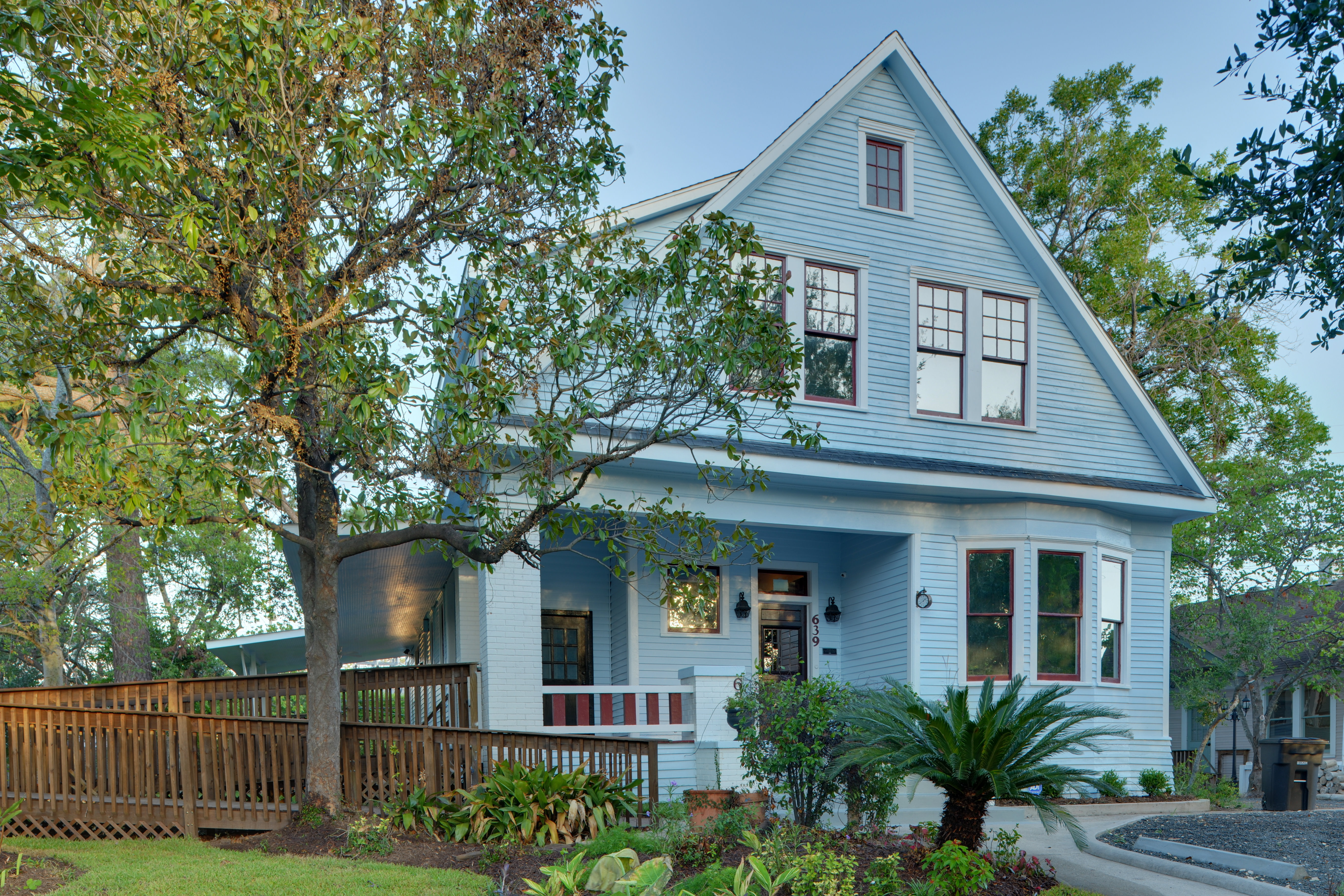
- The house's exterior in 2011

- Location within Texas Location within the United States
- Location: 639 Heights Blvd., Houston, Texas
- Coordinates: 29°46′56″N 95°23′52″W
- Area: less than one acre
- Built: 1907
- Architectural style: Bungalow/craftsman
- MPS: Houston Heights MRA
- NRHP reference No.: 83004465
- Added to NRHP: June 22, 1983

The Isbell House, located at 639 Heights Boulevard in Houston, Texas, was listed on the National Register of Historic Places on June 22, 1983. It is one of 104 structures nominated to the Register in 1983 as part of the Houston Heights Multiple Resource Area in the Houston Heights neighborhood.

== See also ==
- National Register of Historic Places listings in Harris County, Texas
