= Burge House =

Historic house in Texas, United States

- U.S. National Register of Historic Places
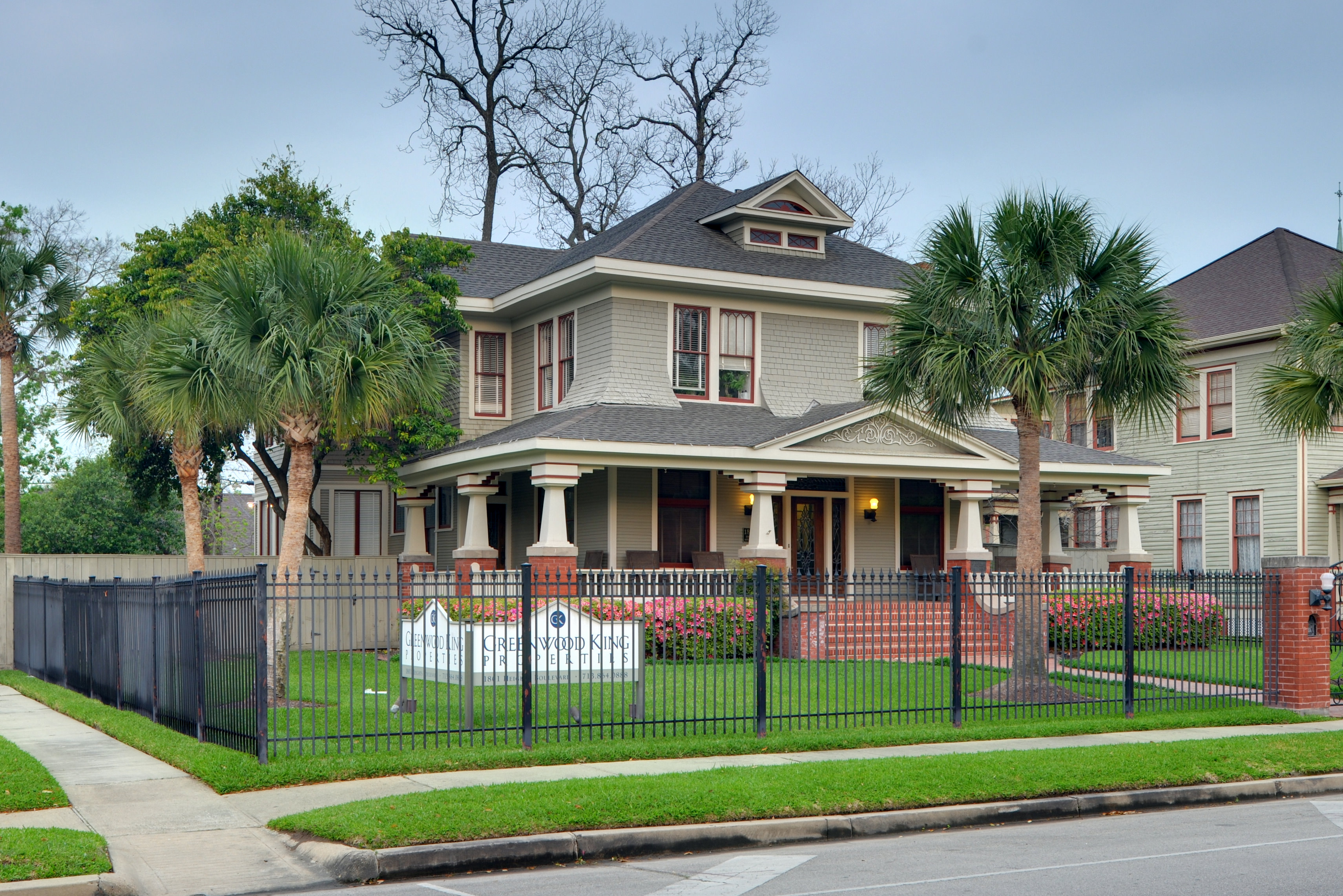
- The Burge House in 2011

- Location within Texas Location within the United States
- Location: Houston, Texas
- Coordinates: 29.8022°N 95.3983°W
- Built: c. 1910
- Architectural style: Late 19th and 20th Century Revival
- MPS: Houston Heights MRA (64000847)
- NRHP reference No.: 83004430
- Added to NRHP: 22 June 1983

The Burge House is a historic house located in Houston, Texas, United States. It was listed on the National Register of Historic Places on June 22, 1983. It is in the Houston Heights neighborhood, one of the first planned suburbs in Texas.

== Description and history ==
The home was bought in 1910 for US$2,000 (equivalent to $69,107 in 2025) by Robert Burge, president of Burge Manufacturing Co. The two story wood-frame house sits on a large corner lot. It has a hip roof with small central dormers and projecting gables on the sides. The attached porch wraps around one side and is supported by half columns set on brick piers. The porch has rails and balusters between the piers and leads to brick steps to ground level. The gable end over the entry is ornamented. The front door has side lights and a transom, and is flanked symmetrically by two windows. The second floor has shingle walls and two pair of symmetrically set double hung sash windows. The house is considered a good example the transition in architectural style from Victorian influenced Colonial Revival architecture to a more 21st century style with bungaloid elements.

On May 21, 1998, the Houston Archeological and Historical Commission found the house met the criteria for designation as a Landmark of the City of Houston. In 2010 it appeared on a list of designated City of Houston Landmarks. Greenwood Properties announced they purchased the property in 2000 for a residential realty office. In 2006 the house was featured in the Houston Heights Association's "Dickens in the Heights Home Tour and Holiday Market".

== See also ==
- Historic preservation
- National Register of Historic Places listings in Harris County, Texas
