= Allbach House =

Historic house in Texas, United States

- U.S. National Register of Historic Places
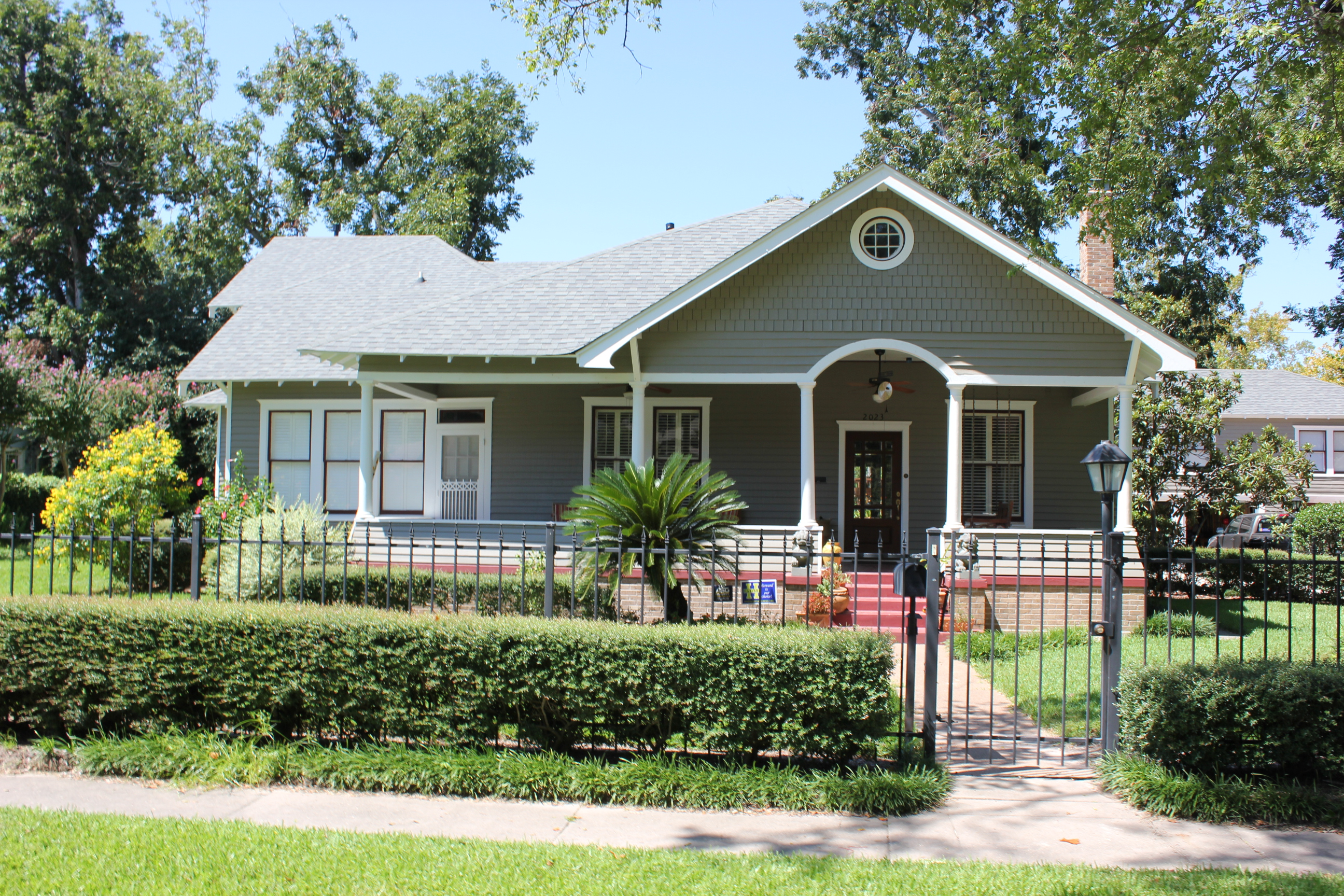

- Location within Texas Location within the United States
- Location: 2023 Arlington St., Houston, Texas
- Coordinates: 29°48′16″N 95°23′41″W
- Area: less than one acre
- Built: 1912
- Architectural style: Colonial Revival, Bungalow/Craftsman
- MPS: Houston Heights MRA
- NRHP reference No.: 83004426
- Added to NRHP: June 22, 1983

The Anson M. Allebach (registered as Allbach) House is a house located in Houston, Texas listed on the National Register of Historic Places.

== History ==
The house at 2023 Arlington is contained within the boundaries of the Houston Heights, which was designated a Multiple Resource Area (MRA) by the National Register Program on June 22, 1983. Although the spelling of the name in the National Register nomination is Allbach, the actual correct spelling of the name is Allebach. The Allebach House was built circa 1912 and is classified as a Bungalow style house.

== See also ==
- National Register of Historic Places listings in Harris County, Texas
