= Schauer Filling Station =

- Formerly listed on the U.S. National Register of Historic Places
- Location within Texas
- Location: 1400 Oxford Street, Houston
- Coordinates: 29.796111°N 95.392222°W
- Area: less than one acre
- NRHP reference No.: 83004478

Significant dates
- Added to NRHP: June 22, 1983
- Removed from NRHP: June 14, 2017

The Schauer Filling Station, formerly located at 1400 Oxford Street, was one of the first gas stations in Houston, in the U.S. state of Texas. The station was completed in 1929, and listed on the National Register of Historic Places. The structure was demolished in June 2013 and delisted on June 14, 2017.

== See also ==
- National Register of Historic Places listings in Harris County, Texas
