= Webber House (Houston) =

Historic house in Texas, United States

- U.S. National Register of Historic Places
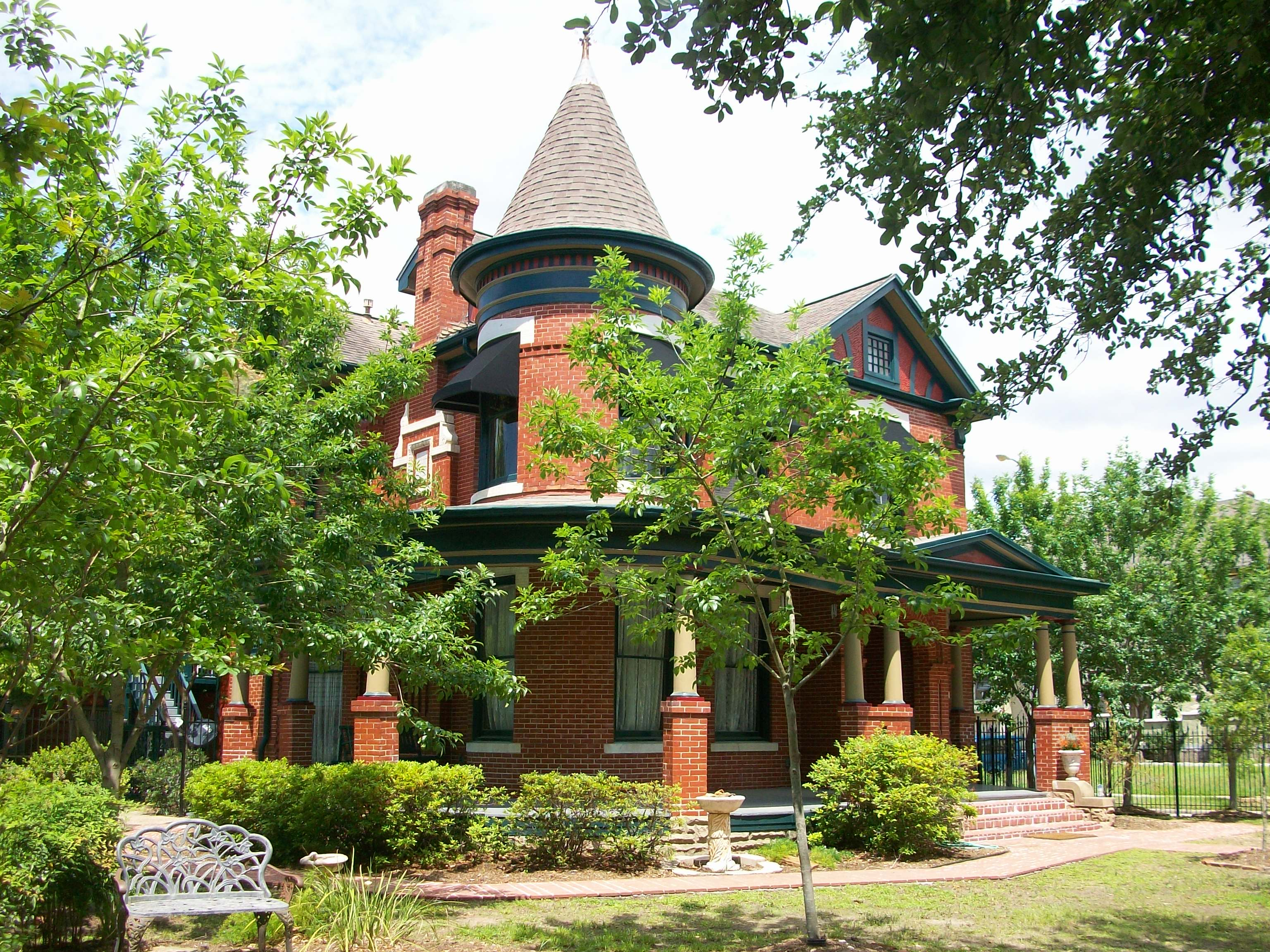

- Location within Texas Location within the United States
- Location: 1011 Heights Blvd., Houston, Texas
- Coordinates: 29°47′26″N 95°23′53″W
- Area: less than one acre
- Built: 1907-1908
- Built by: Webber, Samuel H.
- Architectural style: Colonial Revival, Queen Anne
- MPS: Houston Heights MRA
- NRHP reference No.: 84001829
- Added to NRHP: May 14, 1984

The Webber House at 1011 Heights Blvd. in Houston, Texas was built in 1907-1908 by brickmason Samuel H. Webber. It was listed on the National Register of Historic Places in 1984.

Queen Anne-style houses are not often constructed of brick, but this one is, with brick laid in common bond. The house also shows Colonial Revival influences.

== Gallery ==
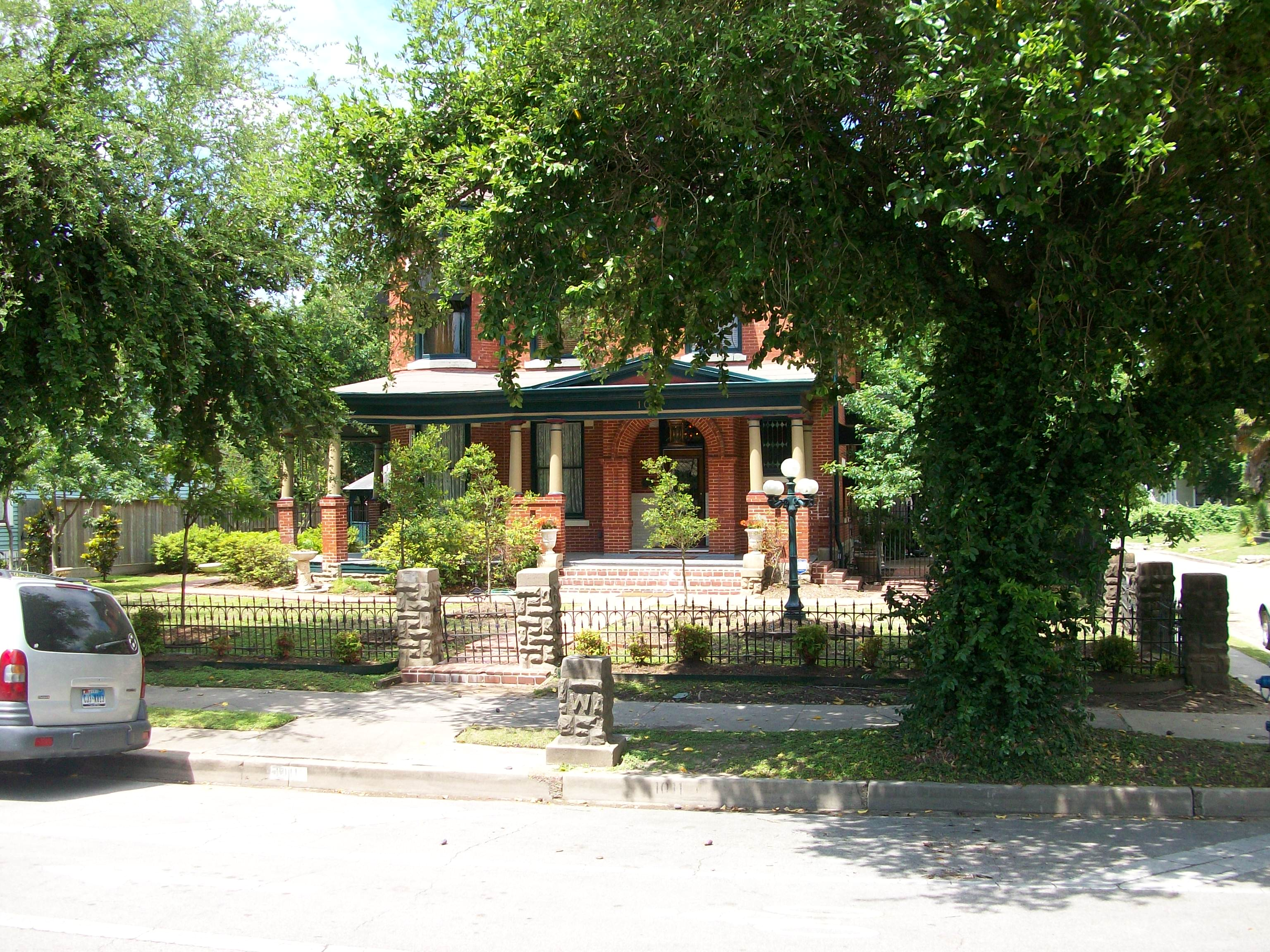
Webber House

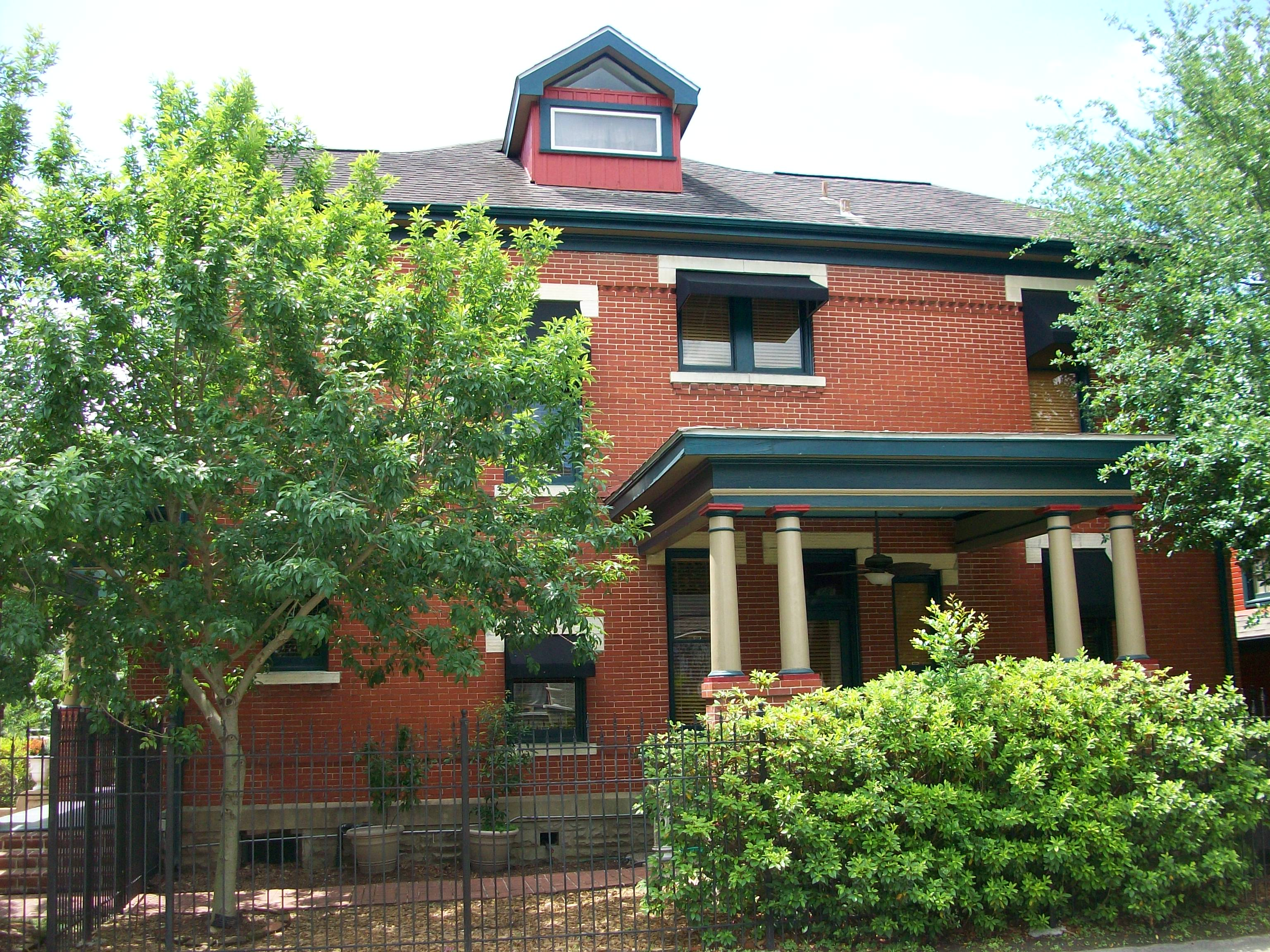
Side view

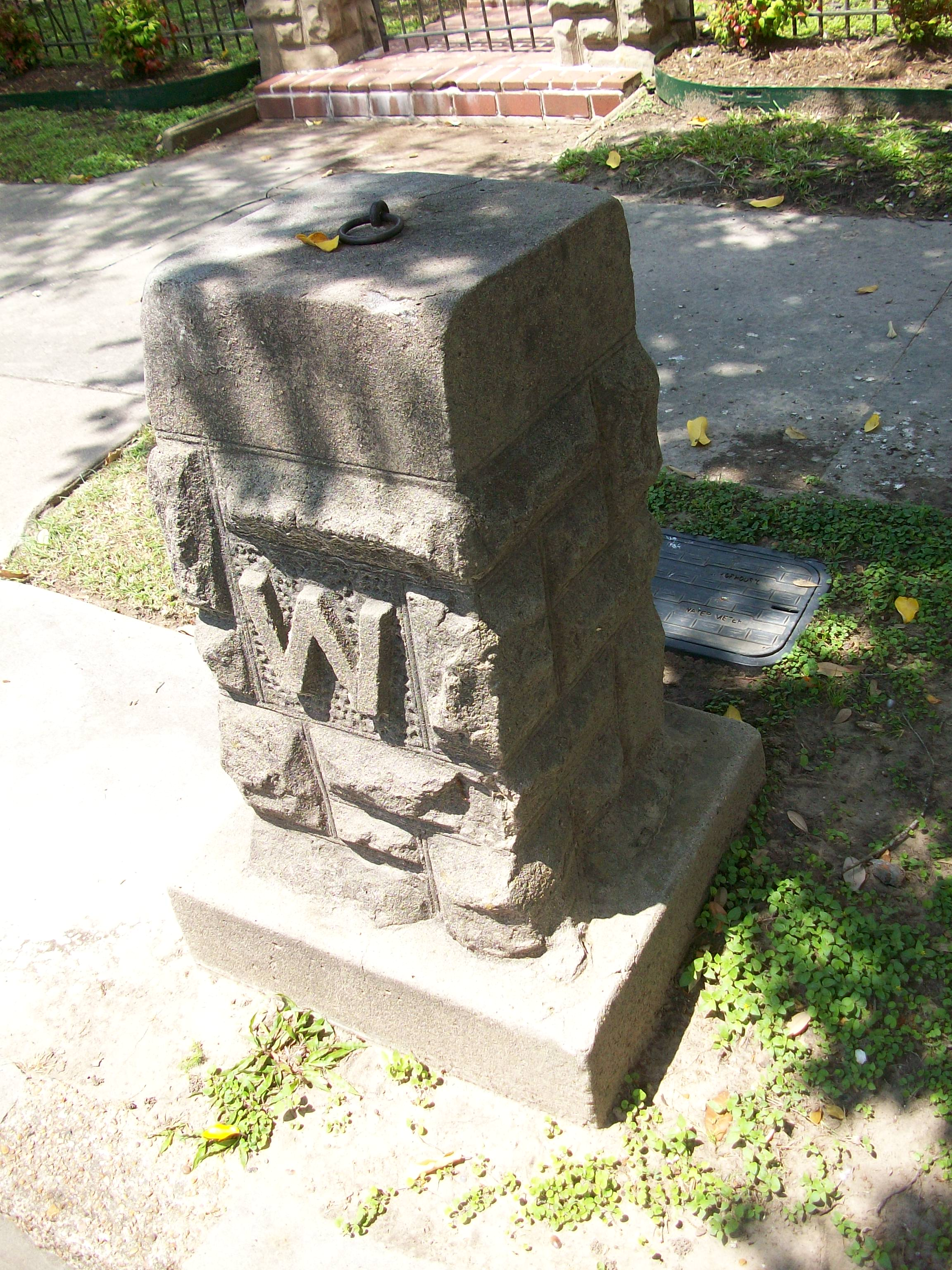
Stone

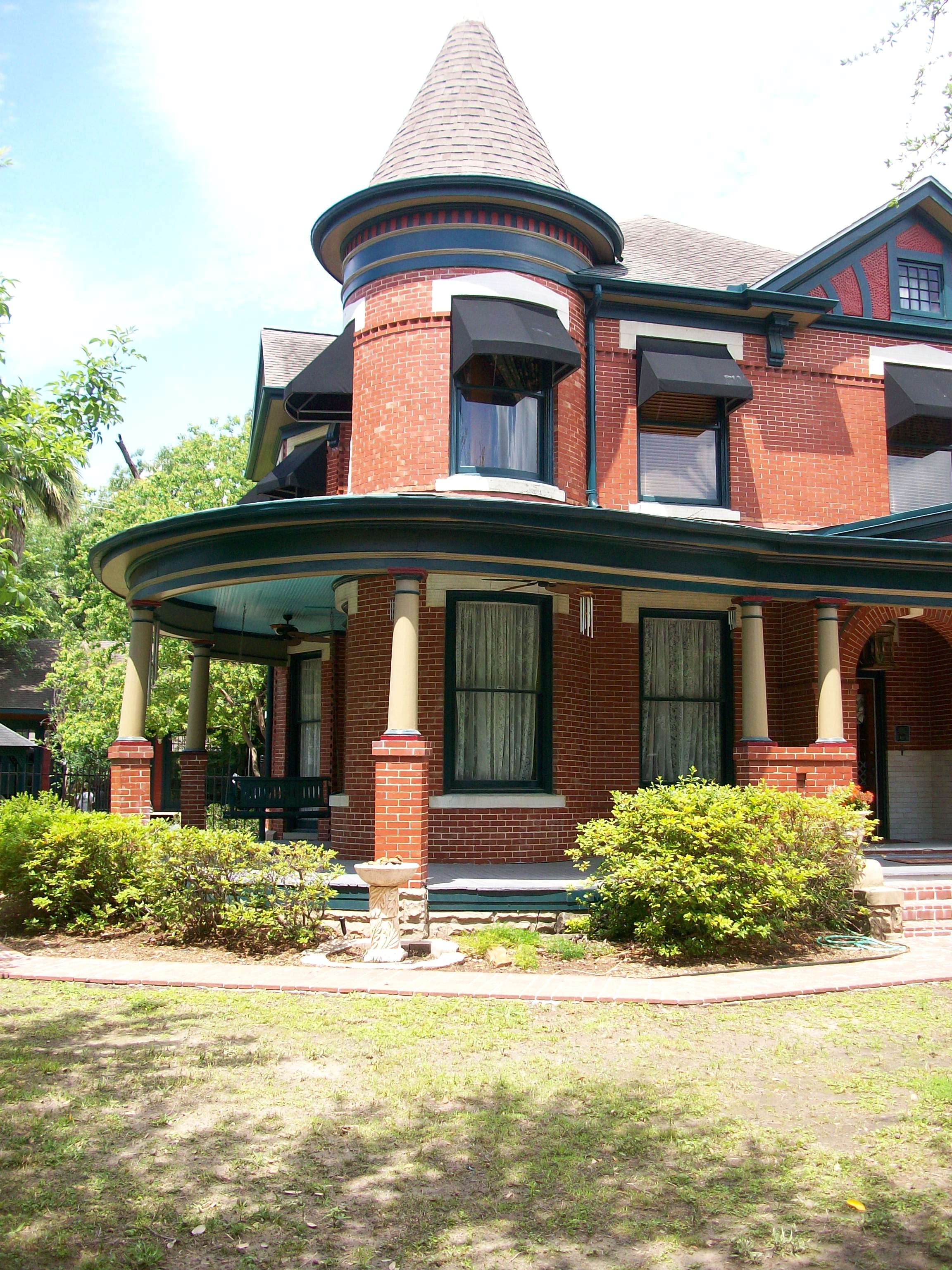
Tower

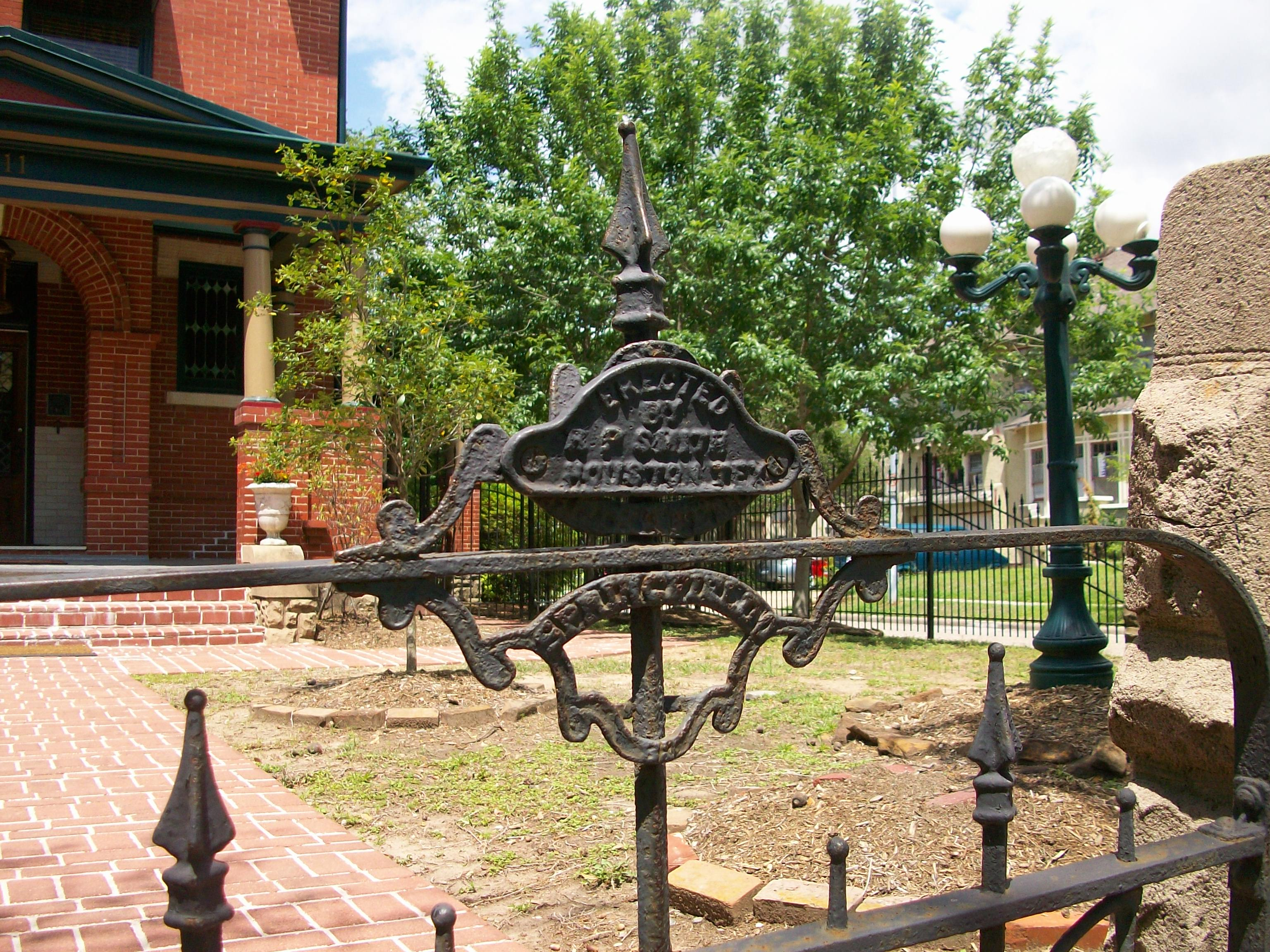
Front Gate

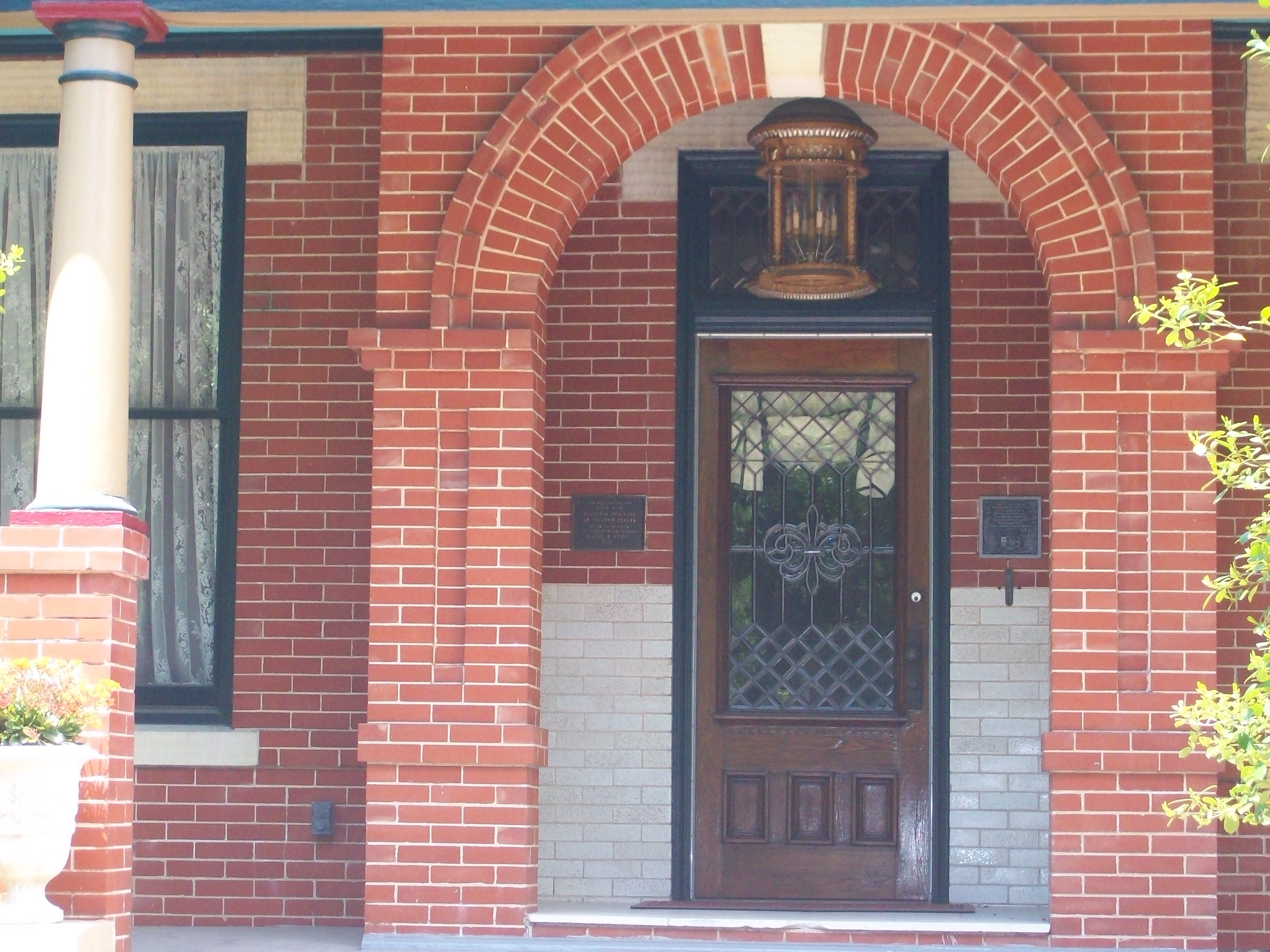
Front door

== See also ==
- Samuel H. Webber House, also NRHP-listed, located at 407 Heights Blvd. in Houston, also built by Webber
