= Gillette House (Houston) =

Historic house in Texas, United States

- U.S. National Register of Historic Places
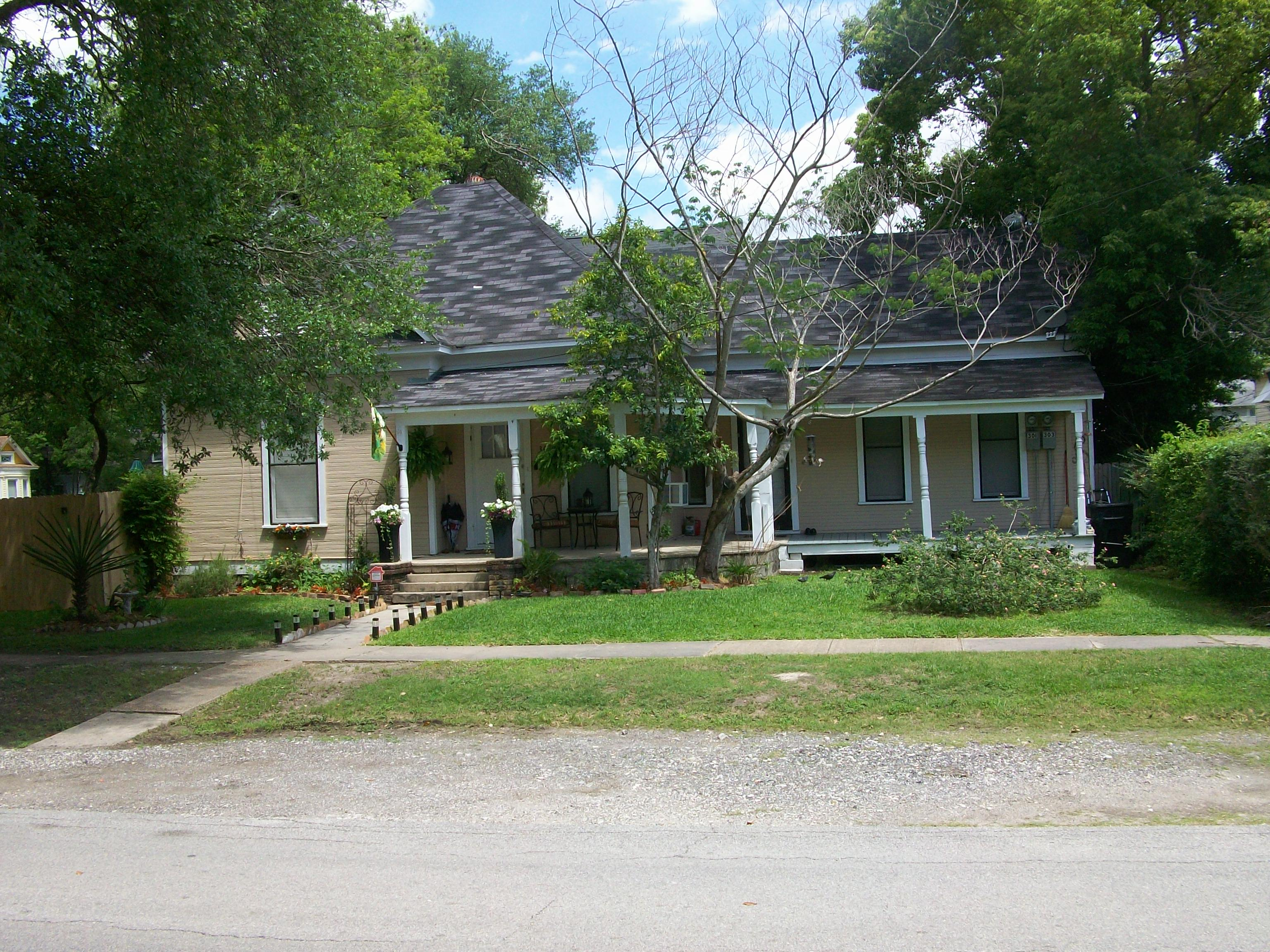

- Location within Texas Location within the United States
- Location: 301-303 E. 15th St., Houston, Texas, 77008
- Coordinates: 29°47′52″N 95°23′43″W
- Area: less than one acre
- Built: 1904
- Architectural style: Queen Anne influence
- MPS: Houston Heights MRA
- NRHP reference No.: 84001764
- Added to NRHP: May 14, 1984

The Gillette House in Houston, Texas is a one-story frame cottage with a hipped roof that was built in 1904 in the Houston Heights area. James Gillette, the original owner, was an attorney. It was listed on the National Register of Historic Places in 1984.

It was deemed notable as a "good example of a simple-type cottage built in early years of [Houston] Heights...for the rising middle-class population". There is Queen Anne influence in its architecture.

== Gallery ==
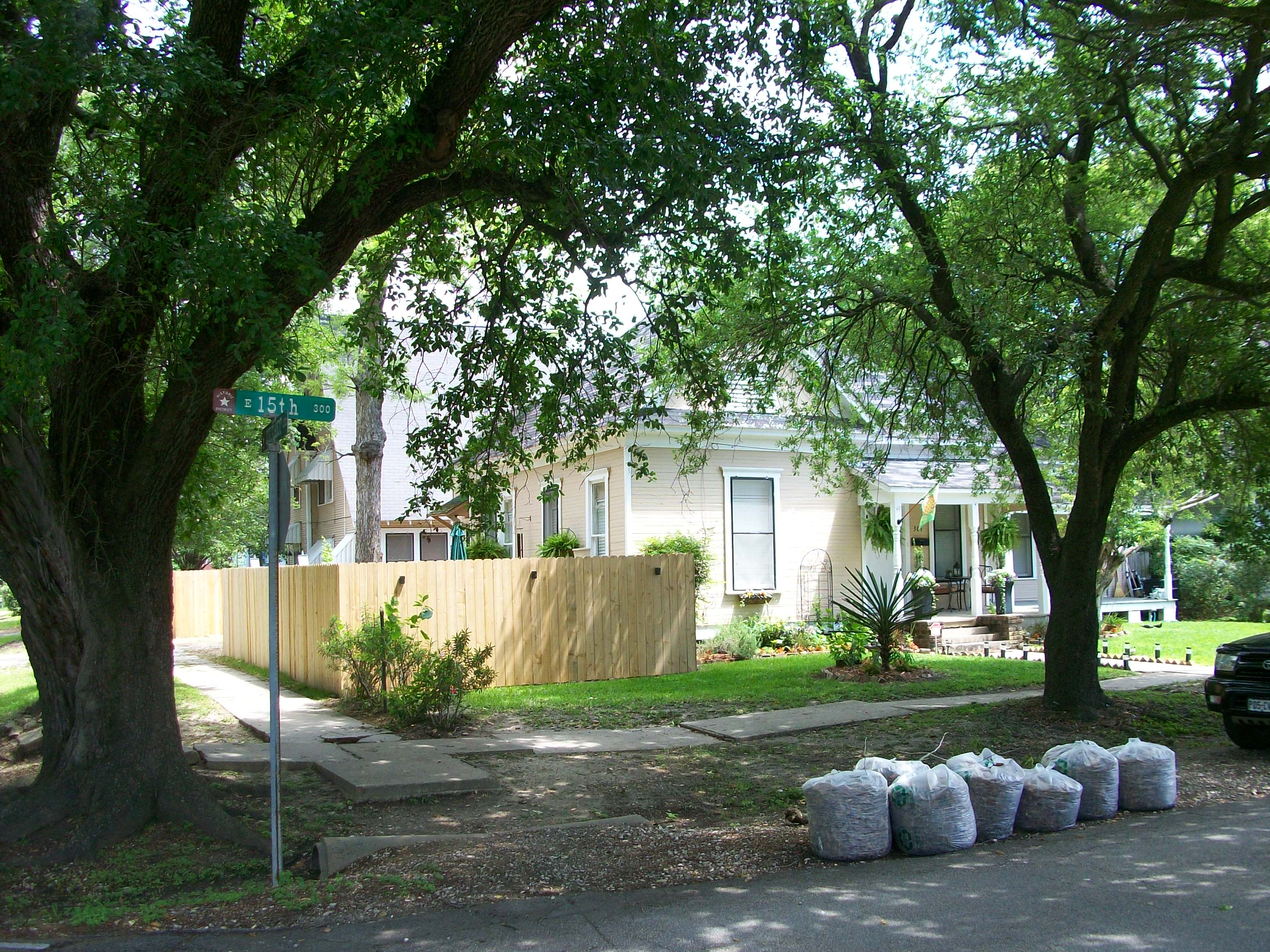
Gillette House corner view

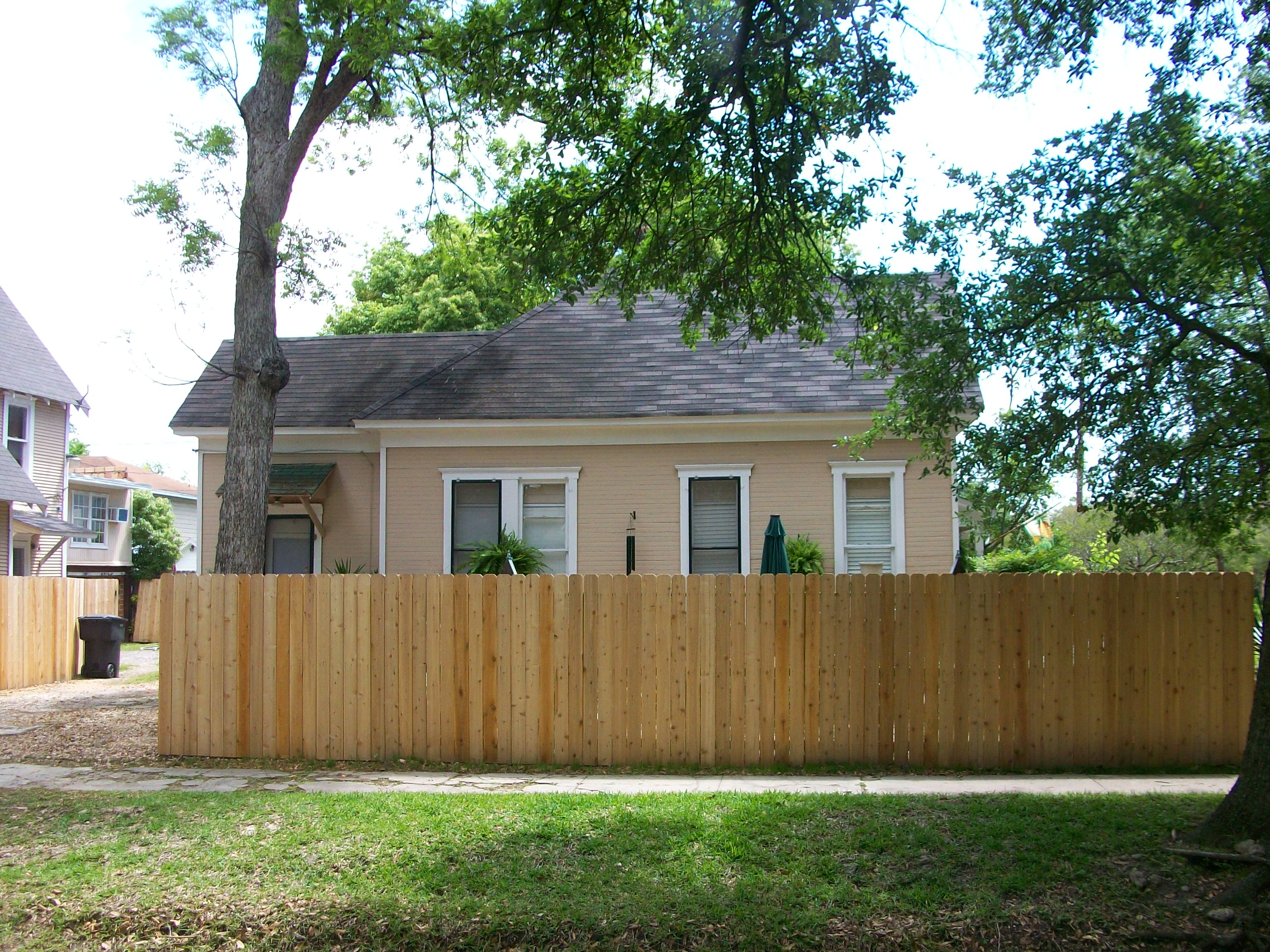
Gillette House side view

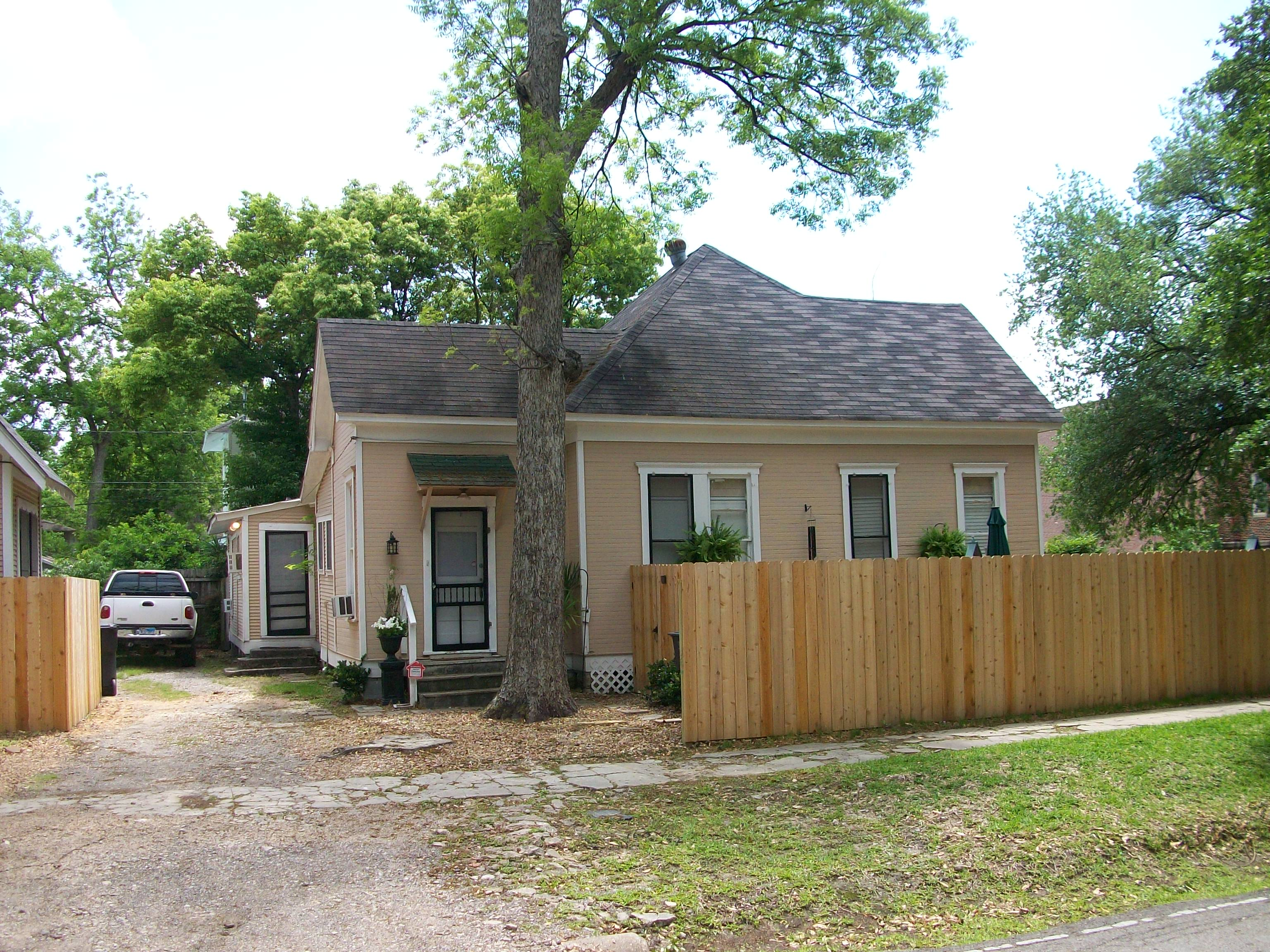
Gillette House rear corner view
