= National Register of Historic Places listings in Harris County, Texas =

Location of Harris County in Texas

The following properties and districts in Harris County, Texas, United States, are listed on the National Register of Historic Places.

Contents: NRHP listings by area in Harris County
downtown Houston - Houston Heights - inner Harris County - outer Harris County

This National Park Service list is complete through NPS recent listings posted September 4, 2026.

== Number of listings by area ==
The properties are distributed across Harris County. There is a concentration in "Downtown Houston", defined as the area enclosed by Interstate 10, Interstate 45, and Interstate 69. More than 100 are in the "Houston Heights" neighborhood whose borders are, approximately, Highway I-10 on the South, I-610 on the North, 45 on the East and Durham on the West. The "inner Harris County" area is defined as the rest of the area within the Interstate 610 loop; "outer Harris County" is defined as the rest of Harris County. There are no listings at all in a few of Houston's exclaves, which extend even beyond the Harris County borders.

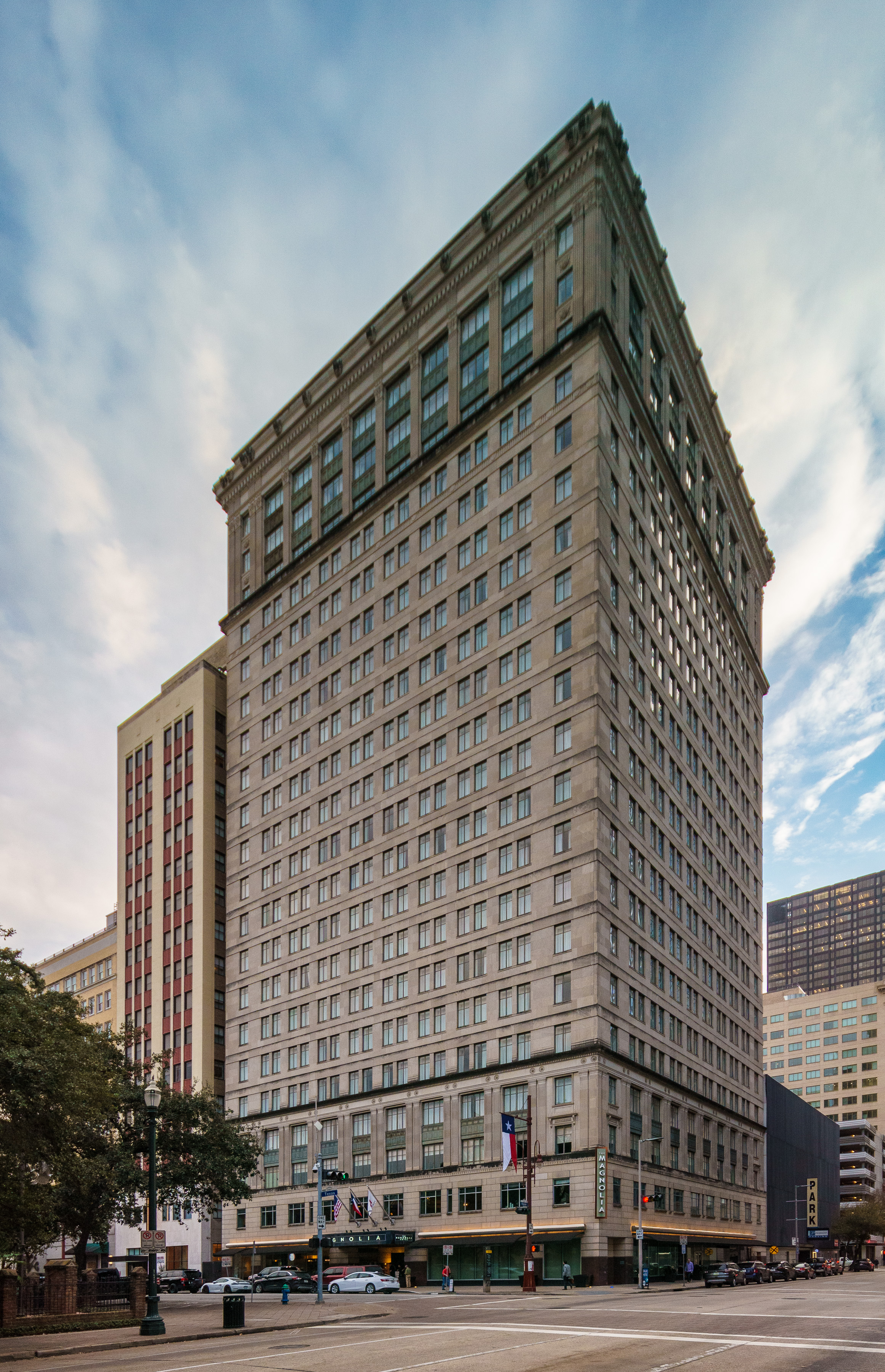
Former Houston Post-Dispatch Building, downtown

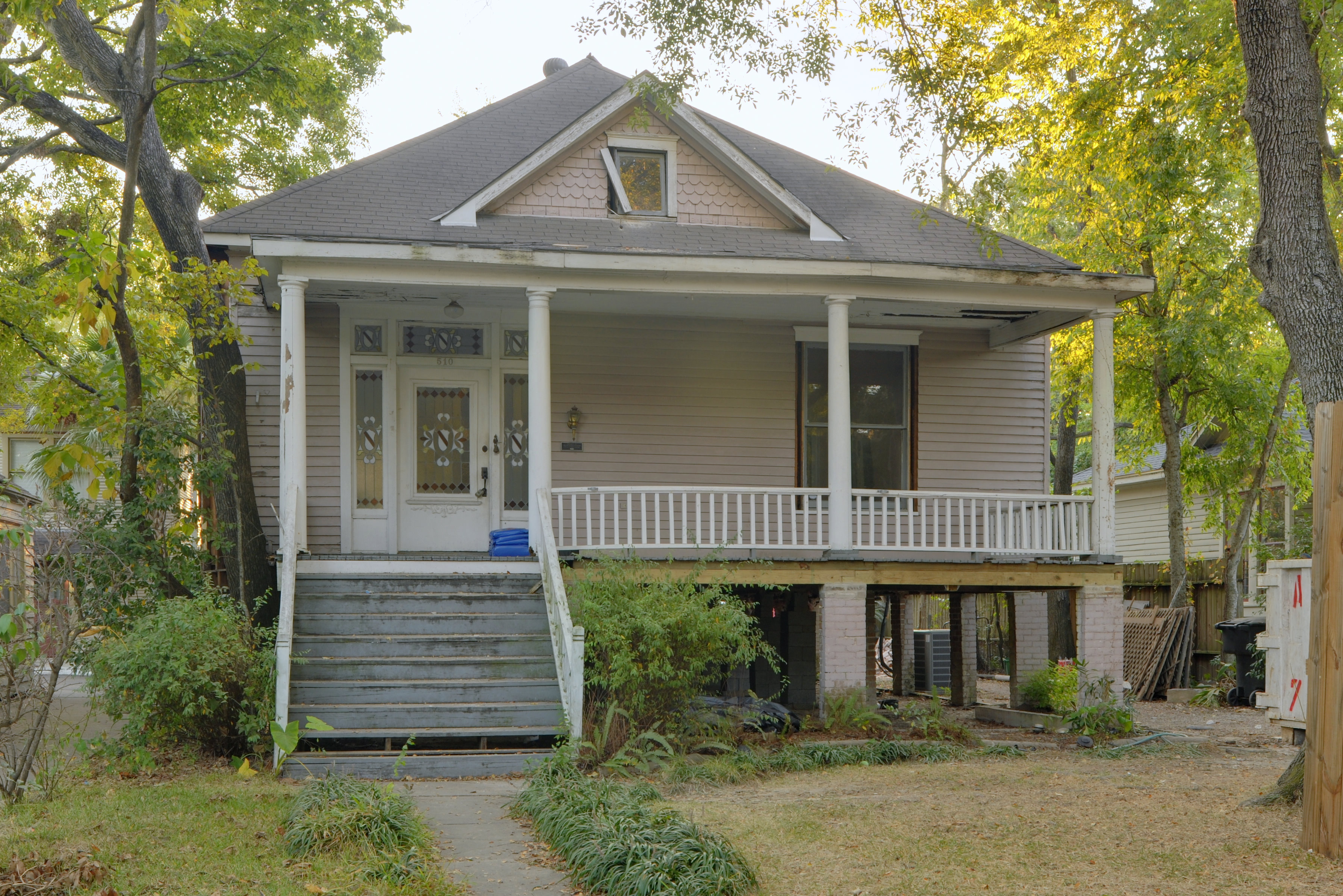
Eaton House, Houston Heights

	Area	# of Sites
1	Downtown Houston	49
2	Houston Heights	124
3	Inner Harris County	105
4	Outer Harris County	33
(Duplicates):		(0)
Total:		311

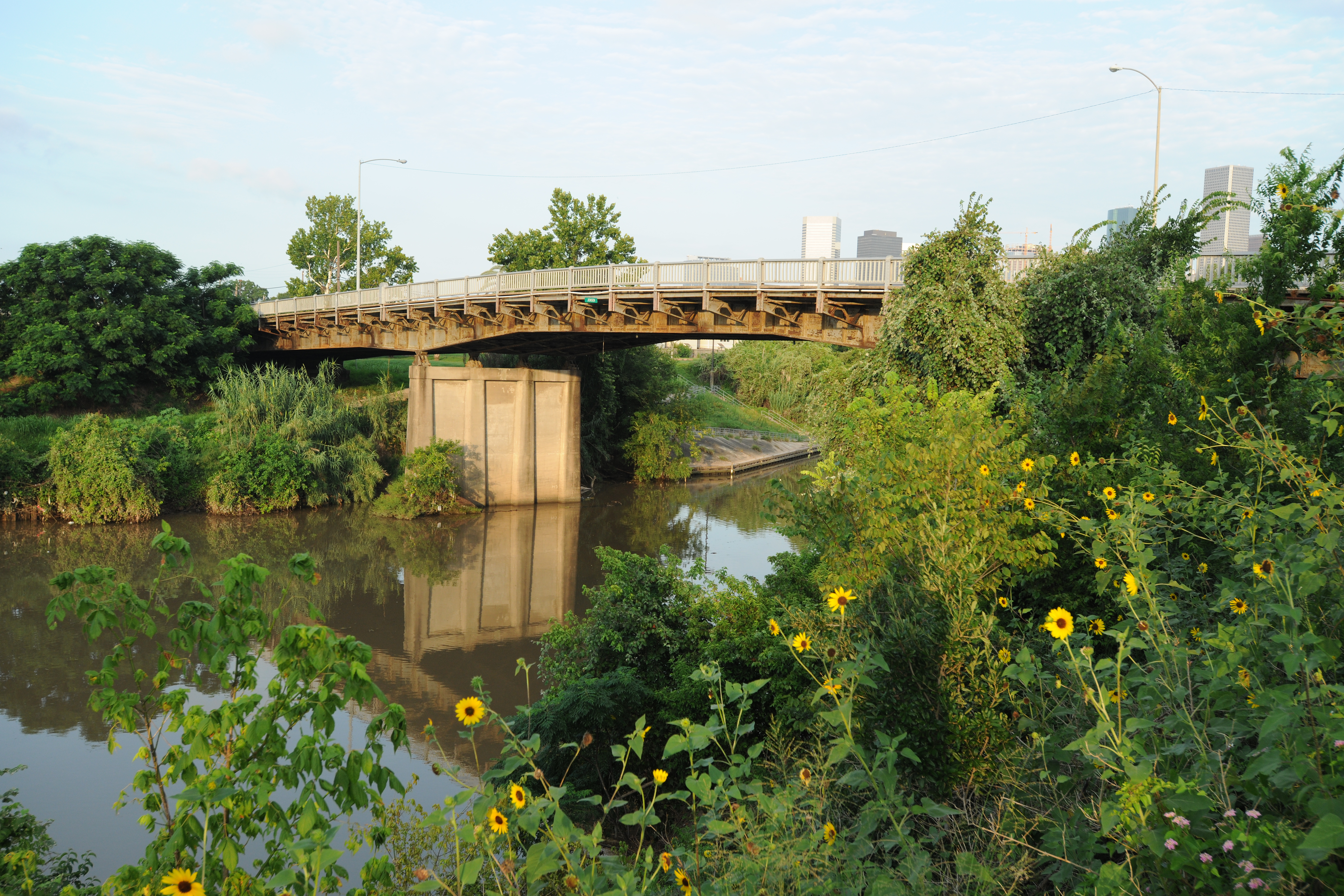
Hill Street Bridge over Buffalo Bayou, inner Harris County

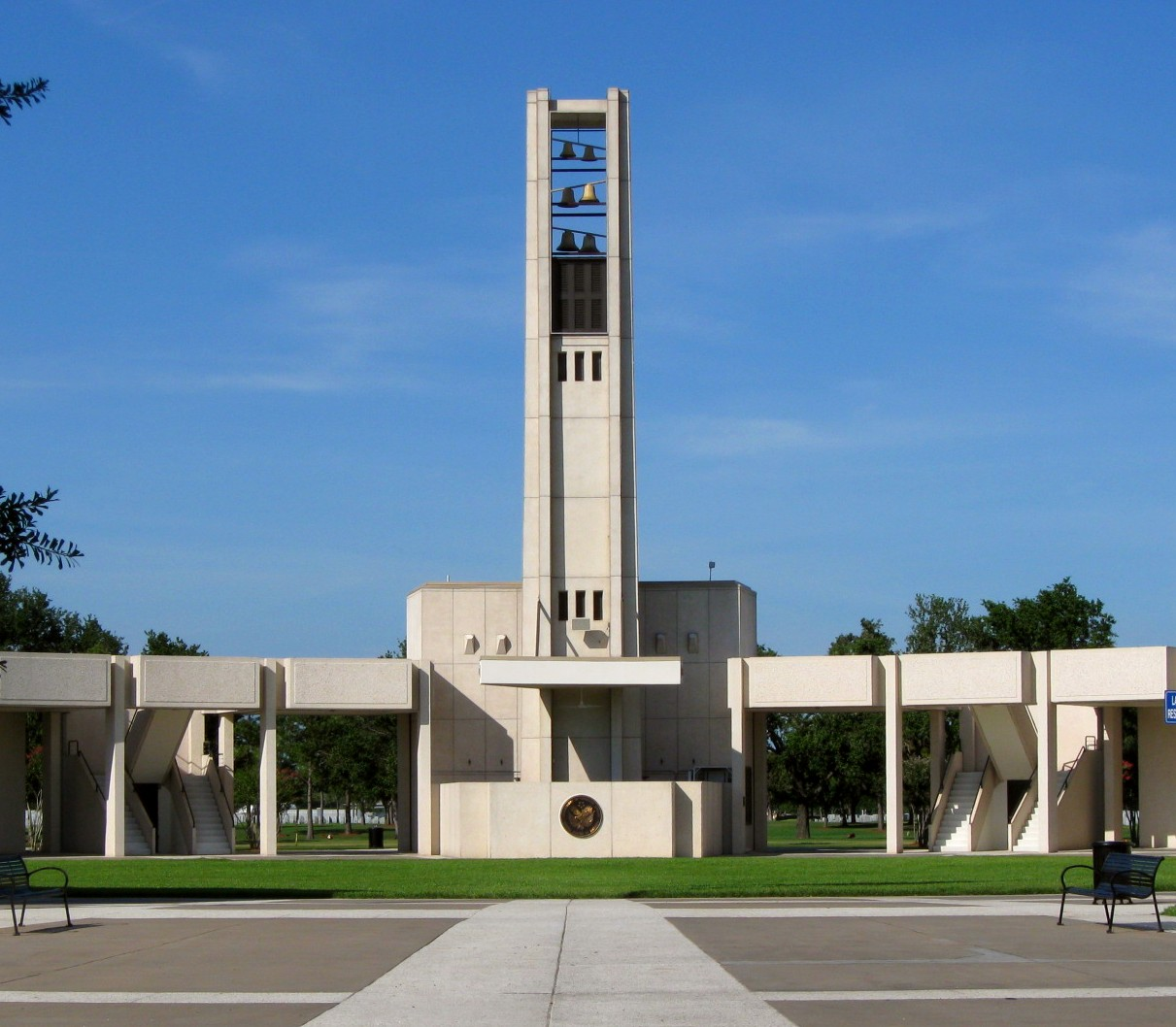
Houston National Cemetery, outer Harris County

== See also ==
- List of National Historic Landmarks in Texas
- National Register of Historic Places listings in Texas
- Recorded Texas Historic Landmarks in Harris County
