= List of churches in the Archdiocese of Galveston–Houston =

The following churches are Roman Catholic Archdiocese of Galveston–Houston.

== List of active parishes ==
Name	Image	Year Established	Location	County	Style	Architect	Notes
Guardian Angel Church			Wallis	Austin			
Immaculate Conception Church			Industry	Austin			
St. Mary Church			Frydek	Austin			
Saints Peter and Paul Church			Bellville	Austin			
Most Holy Trinity Church			Angleton	Brazoria			
Our Lady of Perpetual Help Church			Sweeny	Brazoria			
Sacred Heart of Jesus		2013	Iowa Colony, with a Manvel postal address	Brazoria			
St. Anthony de Padua Church			Danbury	Brazoria			
Saints Cyril and Methodius Church			Damon	Brazoria			
St. Helen Church		1966	Pearland	Brazoria			Its previous church building had a capacity of 900, it was building a new sanctuary, with a capacity of 15,000 and a cost of $7 million. The expansion plans also added parking spaces and installed a bridal facility. The sanctuary construction was to begin fall 2002 and parking construction was to begin summer 2002. In 2002 4,000 families were members, and in 2016 this had increased to 6,000, making it the largest Catholic church in Brazoria County. The property includes a K-8 school, St. Helen Catholic School.
St. Jerome Church			Clute	Brazoria			
St. John the Apostle Mission			West Columbia	Brazoria			
St. John the Baptist Church			Alvin	Brazoria			
St. Joseph on the Brazos Church			Brazoria	Brazoria			
St. Mary Star of the Sea			Freeport	Brazoria			
St. Michael Church			Lake Jackson	Brazoria			
Holy Family Church			Missouri City	Fort Bend			
Holy Rosary Church			Rosenberg	Fort Bend			
Our Lady of Guadalupe Church			Rosenberg	Fort Bend			
Sacred Heart Church			Richmond	Fort Bend			
St. Angela Merici Church			Missouri City	Fort Bend			
St. Michael Church			Needville	Fort Bend			
St. Wenceslaus Mission			Beasley	Fort Bend			
St. Faustina Catholic Church		2014	Fulshear	Fort Bend			It is in proximity to Cinco Ranch and is popular with Greater Katy's Hispanic population. The church has Spanish worship services, and occupies a 1,600-seat building on 24 acres (9.7 ha) of land in Cross Creek Ranch. St. Faustina was established in 2014 to relieve Epiphany of the Lord, Guardian Angel, Holy Rosary of Rosenberg, Sacred Heart, and St. Bartholomew as suburban growth had increased the number of area residents. Initially, masses were held in Joe Hubenak Elementary School, a Lamar Consolidated Independent School District facility. In 2017 it moved into its current building.
St. John Fisher Church			unincorporated area next to Richmond	Fort Bend			
St. Laurence Church			Sugar Land	Fort Bend			Its sanctuary had its dedication ceremony in 1992. By 2006 St. Laurence had 4,600 families on its rolls and was oversubscribed. Its service area included Sienna Plantation.
St. Mark the Evangelist Church			Fort Bend Houston, Houston	Fort Bend			
St. Theresa Church			Sugar Land	Fort Bend			The Imperial Sugar Company donated the land for the church, which opened in 1924. In 1955 the Basilian Fathers began serving as employees. In 2006 it was finalizing expansion plans, which originated from a 2005 survey.
St. Thomas Aquinas Church			Sugar Land	Fort Bend			
Mary Queen Church			Friendswood	Galveston			
Queen of Peace Church			La Marque	Galveston			
Our Lady of Lourdes Church			Hitchcock	Galveston			
Shrine of the True Cross Church			Dickinson	Galveston			
St. Mary Church			League City	Galveston			
St. Mary of the Miraculous Medal Church			Texas City	Galveston			
St. Mary, Star of the Sea Church			Freeport	Galveston			
Holy Rosary Church		1889	Galveston	Galveston			This is a part of the Holy Family Parish, which is a multi-location parish established on August 15, 2009 as a merger of several existing parishes. In 2010 the archdiocese classified it as "mid-sized" due to it having 2,600 households in its congregation. The congregation's number of church services per weekend was ten; KTRK-TV stated that this number of services "exceeds norms for a parish of its size." In 2010 it had six deacons and four priests. Holy Rosary was Texas's first Catholic church for black people. Worship services began in 1886, while it used a building for its affiliated Catholic school, and in 1889 the parish was formally established. In 2009 the archdiocese announced that the Holy Rosary educational building, dormitory for women, gymnasium, pavilion, and rectory would be razed, while leaving the worship building intact. The Texas Historical Commission (THC) in 2017 established a historical marker.
Sacred Heart Church			Galveston	Galveston			This is a part of the Holy Family Parish, which is a multi-location parish established on August 15, 2009 as a merger of several existing parishes. In 2010 the archdiocese classified it as "mid-sized" due to it having 2,600 households in its congregation. The congregation's number of church services per weekend was ten; KTRK-TV stated that this number of services "exceeds norms for a parish of its size." In 2010 it had six deacons and four priests. In 2009 the archdiocese announced that it would raze Sacred Heart's educational building, gymnasium, and meeting rooms, leaving the worship building and rectory intact.
St. Mary Cathedral Basilica			Galveston	Galveston			This is a part of the Holy Family Parish, which is a multi-location parish established on August 15, 2009 as a merger of several existing parishes. In 2010 the archdiocese classified it as "mid-sized" due to it having 2,600 households in its congregation. The congregation's number of church services per weekend was ten; KTRK-TV stated that this number of services "exceeds norms for a parish of its size." In 2010 it had six deacons and four priests.
St. Patrick Church			Galveston	Galveston			This is a part of the Holy Family Parish, which is a multi-location parish established on August 15, 2009 as a merger of several existing parishes. In 2010 the archdiocese classified it as "mid-sized" due to it having 2,600 households in its congregation. The congregation's number of church services per weekend was ten; KTRK-TV stated that this number of services "exceeds norms for a parish of its size." In 2010 it had six deacons and four priests.
Mary, Star of the Sea			Jamaica Beach	Galveston			This is a part of the Holy Family Parish, which is a multi-location parish established on August 15, 2009 as a merger of several existing parishes. In 2010 the archdiocese classified it as "mid-sized" due to it having 2,600 households in its congregation. The congregation's number of church services per weekend was ten; KTRK-TV stated that this number of services "exceeds norms for a parish of its size." In 2010 it had six deacons and four priests.
Our Lady by the Sea Chapel			Crystal Beach in the Bolivar Peninsula	Galveston			This is a part of the Holy Family Parish, which is a multi-location parish established on August 15, 2009 as a merger of several existing parishes. In 2010 the archdiocese classified it as "mid-sized" due to it having 2,600 households in its congregation. The congregation's number of church services per weekend was ten; KTRK-TV stated that this number of services "exceeds norms for a parish of its size." In 2010 it had six deacons and four priests. Intended to serve all Catholics of the peninsula, it was built on the site of the former St. Therese of Lisieux Mission, which Hurricane Ike damaged in 2008. The design was intended to repel effects from hurricanes. John Nova Lomax of the Houston Press wrote that "Our Lady effectively consolidates [St Therese of Lisieux] and Port Bolivar's Our Mother of Mercy". It was dedicated in 2010. Between Hurricane Ike and the opening of Our Lady by the Sea, Bolivar residents attended church in Galveston or in Winnie. Residents opposed to the demolition of Our Mother of Mercy expressed a negative reception to the opening of Our Lady by the Sea.
Christ Our Light Church			Navasota	Grimes			
St. Joseph Mission			Stoneham	Grimes			
St. Mary Church			Plantersville	Grimes			
St. Stanislaus Church			Anderson	Grimes			
All Saints Church			Houston Heights	Harris			
Annunciation Church			Downtown Houston	Harris			
Ascension Chinese Mission (traditional Chinese: 美華天主堂; simplified Chinese: 美华天主堂; pinyin: Měi Huà Tiānzhǔ Táng; lit. 'US-China Catholic Church'		1988	Alief super neighborhood, Houston	Harris			It originated from a Chinese worship service that was established in the 1970s. The parish was created in 1988, initially operating out of a commercial center in the southwest Houston Chinatown area. It relocated to its current site in Spring 1991.
Assumption Catholic Church			North Houston	Harris			
Blessed Sacrament Catholic Church			East End	Harris			
Catholic Charismatic Center			East Downtown	Harris			
Christ, The Incarnate Word Church (Vietnamese: Giáo Xứ Đức Kito Ngôi Lời Nhập Thể)		1998	Alief super neighborhood, Houston	Harris			It is one of five Vietnamese Catholic churches in the Houston area.
Christ the King Church			East Norhill	Harris			
Co-Cathedral of the Sacred Heart			Downtown Houston	Harris			
Corpus Christi Church			Westwood subdivision	Harris			
Holy Cross Chapel			Downtown Houston	Harris			
Holy Ghost Church			Gulfton, Houston	Harris			It is on a 10-acre (4.0 ha) property, in the Gulfton area, one city block from Bellaire. The church building is in the shape of a "T". In 2006 it had about 4,000 regular parishioners. It give church services in both English and Spanish, with three masses per language each week. In 2006 a man who was bilingual in English and Spanish was the pastor. A group of volunteers created stained glass windows that were put in the church by 2008; the project began circa 1983.
Holy Name Church			Near Northside, Northside District	Harris			
Holy Rosary Church		1913	Midtown	Harris			The parish was established in 1913. In 1933, it constructed a parish hall. Pastor Joseph Konkel described that parish hall as the city's "only major construction project" due to the effects of the Great Depression on the city's economy. Post-1970s suburbanization had resulted in a decline in parish membership. Circa 1994 the church bought 7,000 square feet (650 m^{2}), which it used for educational programs, in an office complex. Parish membership increased due to gentrification of Midtown post-1994. By 2004 a 15,000-square-foot (1,400 m^{2}) expansion was under way. In 2004 about 25% of the congregation was ethnic Vietnamese, and there are two masses per week in the Vietnamese language. Therefore it is one of five Vietnamese Catholic churches in the Houston area.
Immaculate Conception Church			Magnolia Park, Houston	Harris			Initially the church catered to Anglo whites, with Mexican Americans being forced to go to the back of the church. This was the impetus for establishing Our Lady of Guadalupe.
Immaculate Heart of Mary Church			Houston (Magnolia Park)	Harris			
La Divina Providencia			Port Houston	Harris			
Notre Dame Church		1969	Alief, Houston	Harris			It opened in 1969 with 173 families and a 5,000-square-foot (460 m^{2}) church structure with room for 750. From 1970 to 1975 the Continuing Christian Education and parish hall structures were built. By 2008 the church had 2,600 families. It previously used a 13,000-square-foot (1,200 m^{2}) sanctuary. By 2008 it struggled to cope with the demand, so it began building a new sanctuary and day chapel as part of a $5.7 million capital campaign, with 20,280 square feet (1,884 m^{2}) of space. The South Continuing Christian Education structure previously on the site was to be razed. Its site has 10 acres (4.0 ha) of land.
Our Lady of Czestochowa Roman Catholic Parish			Spring Branch, Houston	Harris			A Polish American church, it was established in the 1980s. At the time Polish immigrants who resisted Communist rule in that country arrived in Houston.
Our Lady of Guadalupe Catholic Church			(Second Ward, East End, Houston	Harris			
Our Lady of Lourdes Church			Northwest Houston	Harris			It is one of five Vietnamese Catholic churches in the Houston area.
Our Lady of Sorrows Church			Northeast Houston	Harris			
Our Lady of St. John Church			Northeast Houston	Harris			
Our Lady Star of the Sea Church			East Houston	Harris			
Our Mother of Mercy Catholic Church			Fifth Ward, Houston	Harris			
Our Lady of Mount Carmel Church			Southeast Houston	Harris			
Prince of Peace Catholic Community			Houston	Harris			
Queen of Peace Church			East End	Harris			
Resurrection Church			Denver Harbor, Houston	Harris			
St. Albert of Trapani Church			Brays Oaks, Houston	Harris			
St. Alphonsus Church			Manchester, Houston	Harris			
St. Ambrose Church			Oak Forest, Houston	Harris			
St. Andrew Kim Catholic Church (Korean: 휴스턴한인천주교회)			Spring Branch, Houston	Harris			Named after Andrew Kim Taegon, it serves ethnic Koreans and Korean speakers in the archdiocese.
St. Anne Church			River Oaks / Neartown/Montrose, Houston	Harris			It holds an annual event, established in 1948, called "Fall Fiesta".
St. Anne De Beaupre Church			Sunset Heights Extension No. 2	Harris			The third black church, St. Anne de Beaupre, named after the Basilica of Sainte-Anne-de-Beaupré in Sainte-Anne-de-Beaupré, Quebec, Canada, opened in 1938. It was initially a dependency of Our Mother of Mercy. The naming after a Francophone Canadian site reflects the Louisiana Creole culture. It is in proximity to the Houston Heights, and to Independence Heights.
St. Augustine Church			Southeast Houston	Harris			
St. Benedict the Abbot Church		1963	5 Corners District	Harris			Established in June 1963, with Montgomery Elementary School being the initial church location. The groundbreaking of the permanent facility was on May 22, 1964.
St. Bernadette Church			Clear Lake City	Harris			
St. Catherine of Siena Church			Spring Branch, Houston	Harris			
TBD			TBD	Harris			
TBD			TBD	Harris			
TBD			TBD	Harris			
TBD			TBD	Harris			
TBD			TBD	Harris			
TBD			TBD	Harris			
TBD			TBD	Harris			
TBD			TBD	Harris			
TBD			TBD	Harris			
TBD			TBD	Harris			
TBD			TBD	Harris			
TBD			TBD	Harris			
TBD			TBD	Harris			
TBD			TBD	Harris			
TBD			TBD	Harris			
TBD			TBD	Harris			
TBD			TBD	Harris			
TBD			TBD	Harris			
TBD			TBD	Harris			
TBD			TBD	Harris			
TBD			TBD	Harris			
TBD			TBD	Harris			
TBD			TBD	Harris			
TBD			TBD	Harris			
TBD			TBD	Harris			
TBD			TBD	Harris			
TBD			TBD	Harris			
Sacred Heart Church			Conroe	Montgomery			
St. Matthias the Apostle Church			Magnolia	Montgomery			
St. Anthony of Padua Church			The Woodlands	Montgomery			It had 3,020 families in its congregation in 2006, and 5,700 families in its congregation in 2013. It operates St. Anthony of Padua Catholic School.
St. John of the Cross Church			New Caney	Montgomery			
St. Martha Church		1979	Porter	Montgomery			It was established on February 25, 1979 with it initially being in Elm Grove Elementary School in Kingwood. The permanent building was built, with completion in September 1980 and with dedication the following month. Construction on the current building in Porter began in 2009, and it was dedicated on August 12, 2011. The faith formation office remains in Kingwood, as does the K-8 parish school.
Saints Simon and Jude Church		1980	The Woodlands	Montgomery			The first Catholic church in The Woodlands, it was established circa 1980, with its 400 parishioners initially meeting at Knox Junior High School before moving into its permanent building in 1981. As of 2013 it had 3,800 families in its congregation.
St. Stephen the Martyr Mission			Point Blank	San Jacinto			
St. Joseph Church			New Waverly	Walker			
St. Thomas the Apostle Church			Huntsville	Walker			
Sacred Heart Church			unincorporated area next to Pattison	Waller			
St. Katharine Drexel Church			Hempstead	Waller			

=== Harris County ===
==== Houston city limits ====
- St. Charles Borromeo Church (Northside District)
- St. Christopher Church (Southeast Houston)
- St. Clare of Assisi Church (Clear Lake City) - Its 33,000-square-foot (3,100 m^{2}) addition opened in 2015. Inside are a 5,000-square-foot (460 m^{2}) narthex as well as meeting rooms.
- St. Cyril of Alexandria Church (Westchase)
- St. Frances Cabrini Church (Southeast Houston)
- St. Francis de Sales Church (Sharpstown Country Club Terrace Section 2) - As of 2006 it had 2,700 families.
- St. Francis of Assisi Church (Kashmere Gardens)
- St. Francis Xavier Church (Southern Houston)
- St. Gregory the Great Church (Northeast Houston)
- St. Jerome Church (Spring Branch)
- St. John Vianney Church (Memorial)
- St. Joseph - St. Stephen Church (Sixth Ward) - It formed by the 2016 merger of St. Joseph and St. Stephen parishes. The archdiocese first announced the merger proposal in 2014.
- St. Justin Martyr Church (Alief)
- St. Martha Church Faith Formation Office and Catholic School (Kingwood) - Previously the main campus was in Kingwood; it is currently in Porter.
- St. Mary of the Purification Church (Third Ward) - It was established on April 5, 1929.
- St. Michael Church (West Houston) - It is in proximity to the Houston Galleria.
- St. Monica Church (Acres Homes) - The parish was established in 1964, and it originated from a mission established in the 1940s.
- St. Nicholas Church (East Downtown) - It is Houston's oldest black Catholic church. It is/was considered to be in the Third Ward. By 2012 the church held Swahili masses due to it gaining African immigrant parishioners. In particular it has a group of Cameroonians in the congregation served by the Assumption Cameroonian Catholic Community, so it has services each month tailored to that group. In 2013 the church had experienced multiple instances of copper theft.
- St. Patrick Church (Northside District)
- St. Peter the Apostle Church (Third Ward) - Established in 1941.
- St. Peter Claver Church (Settegast) - It was the first church in the archdiocese with an African-American pastor. It became a parish in November 1964.
- St. Philip Neri Church (southern Houston) - It is in proximity to Sunnyside and South Park.
- St. Philip of Jesus Church (northeast Houston)
- St. Raphael the Archangel Church (west Houston)
- St. Rose of Lima Church (Garden Oaks)
- St. Theresa Church (in Memorial Park) - Started in Memorial Elementary School, with the first worship service April 14, 1946. Groundbreaking of the permanent building was on April 20, 1947.
- St. Thomas More Church (Southwest Houston)
- St. Vincent de Paul Church - It was established in 1939 with the parish church being built from the following year. It is in proximity to West University Place.
- Vietnamese Martyrs Church (Vietnamese: Giáo Xứ Các Thánh Tử Đạo Việt Nam) - It is one of five Vietnamese Catholic churches in the Houston area.

NOTE: St. Mark the Evangelist Church is in the city of Houston but is in Fort Bend County instead of Harris County.

==== Cities other than Houston ====
- Our Lady of Fatima Church (Galena Park)
- Our Lady of Grace Church (South Houston)
- Our Lady of Guadalupe Church (Baytown)
- St. Anne Church (Tomball)
- St. Bartholomew the Apostle Catholic Church (City of Katy) - The church has regular worship services in English, Spanish, and Vietnamese.
- St. Cecilia Church (Hedwig Village, Houston postal address) - Previously St. Theresa church served the Memorial Villages area. St. Cecilia was established by Bishop Nold on July 1, 1956.
- St. Hyacinth Church (Deer Park)
- St. John the Evangelist Church (Baytown)
- St. Joseph Church (Baytown)
- St. Juan Diego Church (Pasadena)
- St. Luke the Evangelist Church Cenacle Learning Center (CLC) (Pearland) (other parts of Pearland with churches are in Brazoria County)
- St. Mary Church (La Porte)
- St. Mary Magdalene Church (Humble) - By 1911 the Church of the Immaculate Conception established the St. Mary's Mission in Humble; it received a permanent building in 1915. At one point the church moved to its current location.
- St. Paul the Apostle Church (Nassau Bay)
- St. Pius V Church (Pasadena)

==== Unincorporated areas ====
- Christ The Good Shepherd Church (Spring postal address) - It was established on April 1, 1978.
- Christ the Redeemer Church (Houston postal address) - It was established after 1980, and originally used Millsap Elementary School as its worship center. The permanent building was dedicated on August 19, 1984, on the same year construction ended. - It was established in 1980. In 2005 Tara Dooley of the Houston Chronicle stated that it had "A swelling membership".
- Epiphany of the Lord Church (Greater Katy) - It opened in 1981. In 1984 a Molotov cocktail damaged the church building. The church building received several additions. Jack Dinkins was the pastor in 2010. As of 2018 Tom Lam is the pastor of Epiphany of the Lord.
- Holy Family Church (McNair)
- Our Lady of Lavang Church (Vietnamese: Giáo Xứ Đức Mẹ Lavang) (Houston postal address) - It is one of five Vietnamese Catholic churches in the Houston area.
- Regina Caeli Parish (Houston postal address) - Established on August 15, 2013, it uses a traditional Latin language worship style from the period before Vatican II. The permanent campus, on 40 acres (16 ha) of land, had its groundbreaking on December 20, 2015. The church's name is "Queen of Heaven" in English.
- Sacred Heart Church (Crosby)
- St. Andrew Church (Channelview)
- St. Dominic Church (Houston postal address)
- St. Edith Stein Church (Greater Katy) It is on 20 acres (8.1 ha) of land adjacent to the Westfield subdivision, opened in September 1999. The Archdiocese of Galveston-Houston bought the site in March 1999. The church's 100-seat 15,000-square-foot (1,400 m^{2}) sanctuary and 20,000-square-foot (1,900 m^{2}) Formation Center were scheduled to be completed in early March 2004 for a total of $5.8 million. Other buildings were to be erected at a later time. Prior to the opening of the permanent facilities, the church was housed in Katy ISD buildings. As of 2002 about 600 families were registered at St. Edith Stein. By 2006 there were 1,400 families.
- St. Edward Church (Spring postal address)
- St. Elizabeth Ann Seton Church (Houston postal address)
- St. Ignatius Loyola Church (Spring postal address) - It was established in 1985. SILCC went viral after Hurricane Harvey when Father Norbert Maduzia declared, "I'm standing inside the church now. I'm just speechless. Everything is lost."
- St. James the Apostle Church (Spring census-designated place)
- St. John Neumann Church (Houston postal address)
- St. Jude Thaddeus Church (Highlands)
- St. Leo the Great Church (Houston postal address)
- St. Luke the Evangelist Church (Houston postal address) The main campus is in an unincorporated area while the Cenacle Learning Center (CLC) is in Pearland.
- St. Martin de Porres Church (Barrett)
- St. Matthew the Evangelist Church (Houston postal address)
- St. Maximilian Kolbe Church (Houston postal address) - In July 1983 the church was established, and it initially used Post Elementary School in Jersey Village before moving to Emmott Elementary School by Summer 1985. The permanent church was built from November 1986 with dedication on November 1, 1987.
- St. Philip the Apostle Church (Huffman)

== List of former parishes ==
- Our Mother of Mercy Church (Port Bolivar, Bolivar Peninsula) - It was established circa 1950. Lomax wrote that the church "was the site of many marriages and funerals for generations of Bolivarians." It closed after Hurricane Ike in 2008. At the end of its life, its congregation numbered 75, although in summer months vacationers also attended church there. Lomax described it as "a dowdy, declining parish". Archbishop Joseph Fiorenza had it razed, despite the lack of damage from the hurricane. The archdiocese argued that keeping the structure would cause further expenses, and that future weather issues could damage the building. Lomax wrote "the archdiocese viewed the church as old and in the way". He added that former members of the congregation had a negative reception to the demolition and the consolidation to the Our Lady By The Sea site at Crystal Beach.
- Reina de la Paz (Galveston) This was a mission of St. Patrick Church. In 2009 the Archdiocese announced that it will sell the site.
- St. Joseph's Church (Galveston) - Closed in 1968
- St. Peter the Apostle Church (Galveston) - In 2009 the archdiocese announced that it will sell the land, with the rectory remaining intact but the other buildings being razed.
- St. Theresa of Liseaux Mission (Crystal Beach) - It was built in 1994. It sustained damage during Hurricane Ike in 2008, and due to the damage the archdiocese had it razed. Our Lady By The Sea was built on its site.
- St. Stephen Church (First Ward, Houston) - The church, which had a congregation with many Mexican immigrants, occupied what Lisa Gray of the Houston Chronicle referred to as "a modest church building" and was in an area experiencing gentrification. It closed in 2016 when it was merged with St. Joseph Church. In 2018, and 2019, there were protests advocating that the archdiocese reopen the church. The leadership of the Catholic church overruled the archdiocese and ordered the church to reopen, but as of 2019 no such reopening has yet occurred.
