= Houston Heights =

- Neighborhood of Houston
- Houston Heights, Texas
- The Houston Heights development on a 1913 map of Houston
- Interactive map of Houston Heights
- State: Texas
- County: Harris
- Established: 1891
- Elevation: 59 ft (18 m)
- Time zone: UTC-6 (Central (CST))
  - Summer (DST): UTC-5 (CDT)
- ZIP code: 77008
- Area codes: 281, 713, 832, 346, 936
- GNIS feature ID: 1374161

Houston Heights (often referred to simply as "The Heights") is a community in northwest-central Houston, Texas, United States.

The Heights forms the core of the city-designated Greater Heights Super Neighborhood, including Norhill and Woodland Heights. The Heights "proper" has a distinct history from its time as an independent Houston suburb. Greater Heights is adjacent to Lazybrook, Timbergrove, Garden Oaks, Oak Forest, Independence Heights, Northside, Old Sixth Ward, and the Washington Avenue corridor.

== History ==
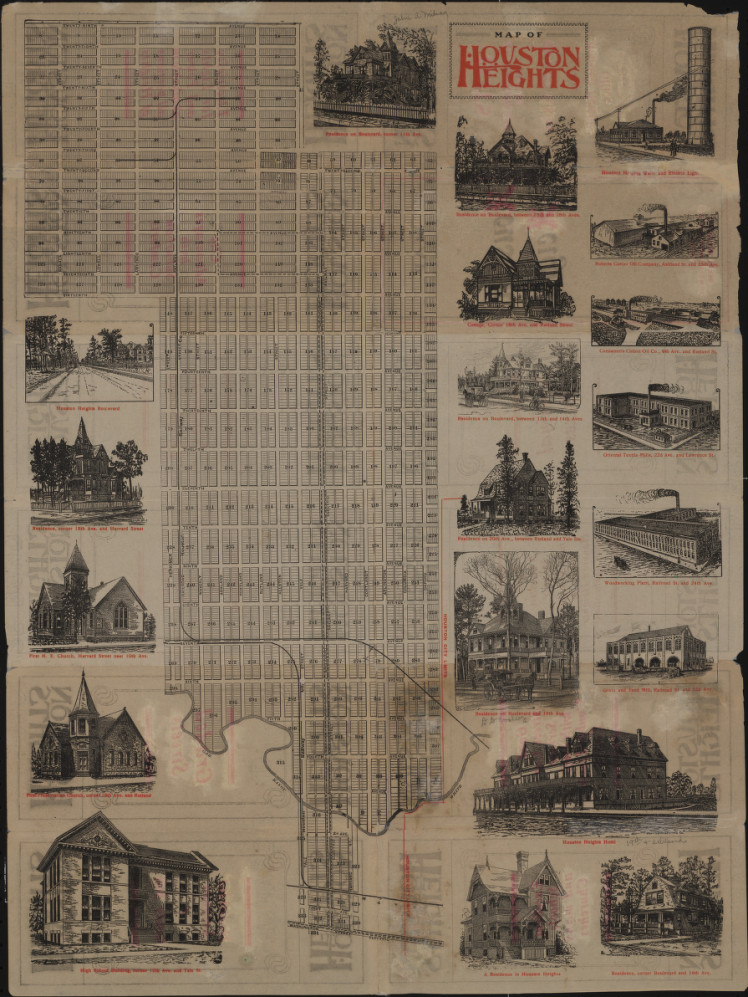
Map of Houston Heights, circa 1890

In 1886, Oscar Martin Carter, a former bank president from Nebraska arrived in Houston and by 1891 he and a group of investors had established the Omaha and South Texas Land Company, managed by Carter and a subsidiary of the American Loan and Trust Company. The company purchased 1,756 acres (7.11 km^{2}) of land and established infrastructure, including streets, alleys, parks, schools, and utilities, worth $500,000. As one of Texas's early planned communities, Houston Heights was founded as a streetcar suburb of Houston and attracted residents who did not wish to live in the dense city but had a way to commute back and forth for work. Another appealing factor to potential residents was that the area is 23 feet higher in elevation than Houston, which was experiencing yellow fever outbreaks along with other waterborne illnesses due to excessive flooding and high levels of mosquitos.

It had its own municipality, established on July 1, 1896 and William G. Love served as the first mayor and J.B. Marmion was the fifth and final mayor. According to the U.S. census of 1900 the area had 800 residents and had its own school system, hospital and emergency services. By 1919 the city government experienced difficulty collecting sufficient tax revenue to fund the school system and so the small community agreed to be annexed to the city of Houston.

After World War II industrial interests moved into the Houston Heights.

Sister M. Agatha wrote the book History of the Houston Heights, published in 1956. Some of her research stemmed from a document and photograph collection organized by Jimmie May Hicks, the head librarian at the Heights Public Library from 1931 to 1964.

Marilyn Bardsley of Crime Library stated that the Houston Heights became "decrepit" and "tired" after World War II. In that period several units of housing were subdivided into apartments and maintenance declined. In the 1970s the Houston Heights was considered to be a low income area of the city. In 1973 the Houston Heights Association (HHA) was established to reverse this trend.

On December 13, 1970, Dean Corll began luring and killing children from the Houston Heights which became known as the Houston Mass Murders. For most of the period of his crime spree, Corll lived in or close to Houston Heights as his two teenage accomplices resided there. Other teens from the area were targeted simply because the two teens knew many of them which made it easier to entice them to Corll's various residences during the period.

From the 1980 U.S. census to the 1990 census, the population of the Houston Heights declined by more than 1,000 people per square mile. The Houston Heights Association opened in 1973.

From 1980 to 2017, about 100 houses and other properties in the Heights have been listed on the National Register of Historic Places.

Since the 1990s, and similar to other parts of Houston inside the 610 Loop, the Heights has experienced gentrification, a process ongoing to this day, as young highly paid professionals (many of whom work in Downtown Houston) have flocked to the area, purchasing and renovating some of the historic homes (and demolishing some of them to build newer, upscale housing). Upscale boutiques and restaurants have opened in the area, giving parts of the streetscape an appearance not too much unlike Bellaire, Lower Westheimer or Upper Kirby, but large parts, such as the entirety of Heights Boulevard retain some of the original identity thanks to the older houses and large trees.

The 7,000-square-foot (650 m^{2}) Houston Heights Fire Station, a former fire station at 12th Street at Yale Street was constructed as Houston Heights' city hall and jail, and fire station in 1914. After annexation, it served as a city of Houston fire station from 1918 until 1995. The Houston Heights Association took a 30-year lease on the property from the city and refurbished the property. By December 2009 the former city hall was for sale.

In 2013 CNN Money ranked the Houston Heights as no. 4 in its Top 10 big city neighborhoods ranking.

A section of the Houston Heights was a "dry" (no sales of alcohol allowed) district from 1912 to 2017.

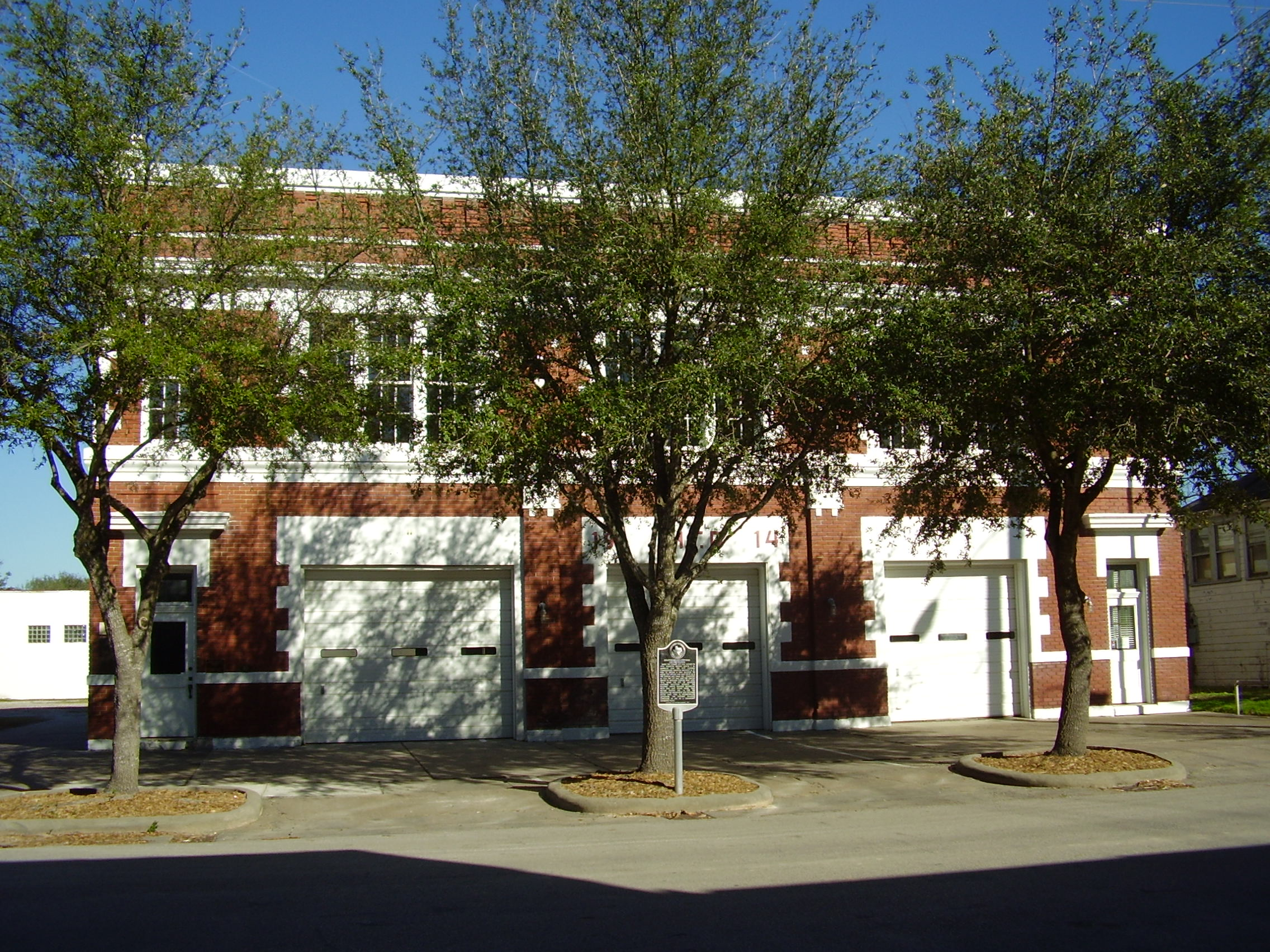
Houston Heights Fire Station - Former city hall and Fire Station 14

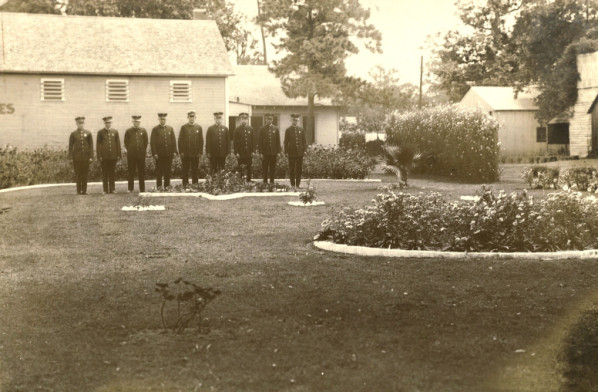
Backyard of Station 14, 1920s

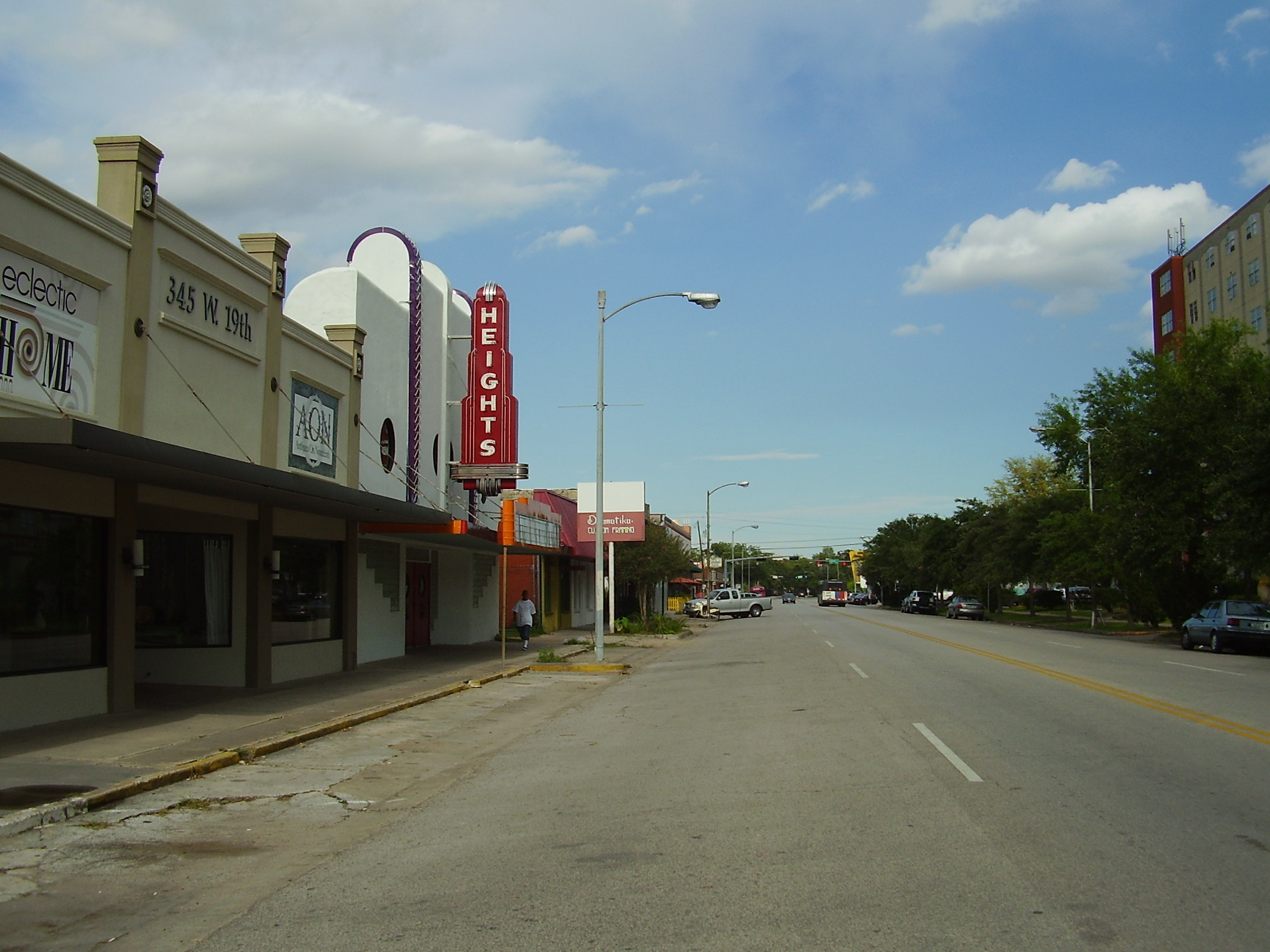
A street view of the Houston Heights

== Cityscape ==
The Houston Heights, one of the earliest planned communities in Texas, is located 4 miles (6.4 km) northwest of Downtown Houston. A National Geographic article says "stroll the area's broad, tree-canopied esplanades and side streets dotted with homes dating from the early 1900s and you may think you've landed in a small town." In 2011 John Nova Lomax said that the Heights, which he describes as "Houston's own mini-Austin," had many "low-key" restaurants and beer gardens. The Houston Heights Association describes the Heights as being bounded by Interstate 10 on the south, North Shepherd Drive on the west, Interstate 610 on the north and both North Main and Studewood Streets on the east.

Neighbourhoods within Houston Heights include Shady Acres in the northwest, Greater Heights in the central, and Woodland Heights in the southeast.

According to a study of the University of Houston Institute of Regional Forecasting and Crawford Realty Advisors, from 2002 to 2003 prices of single family houses appreciated by 8.7 percent. Anjali Athavalley said "[r]eal estate agents say most houses there costing less than $200,000 need serious work" and "[b]uying a single-family house in the Houston Heights, for example, is getting expensive."

Gabi Barrett of Bella Magazine wrote in the Pensacola News Journal stated that the Heights is similar to two neighborhoods in Pensacola, East and North Hill.

In 1976 James Conaway of the Texas Monthly described the Heights as a "seedy, lower-middle-class enclave with horizons limited to once-fashionable homes divided into low-rent apartments, and guarded by pickups on concrete blocks."

Greater Heights is in the northern point of the socioeconomic phenomenon known as the Houston Arrow, an area of increased affluence relative to the rest of the city.

== Climate ==
Climate data for Houston Heights
Month	Jan	Feb	Mar	Apr	May	Jun	Jul	Aug	Sep	Oct	Nov	Dec	Year
Average precipitation inches	4.60	3.33	4.92	4.48	6.20	6.15	4.92	5.87	5.51	5.08	4.98	4.45	60.49
Average precipitation mm	117	85	125	114	157	156	125	149	140	129	126	113	1,536
Source: https://www.ncei.noaa.gov/access/us-climate-normals/#dataset=normals-annualseasonal&timeframe=30&station=USC00414321

== Government and infrastructure ==
=== Local government ===
By 2000 Houston Heights community retained its prohibition of the sale of alcoholic beverages. The Houston Heights passed a prohibition on alcoholic beverages in 1912, and the annexation agreement followed by the City of Houston stipulates that much of the Heights must retain the ban on alcoholic beverages. Many restaurants in the zone got around the ordinance by forming private clubs that patrons may join so that the patrons can order alcoholic beverages. In 2016 the requirement that grocery stores not sell beer nor wine was disbanded through a vote, and in 2017, the prohibition against alcohol in restaurants and on sales of other alcohol was disbanded though the complete dissolution of the 1912 ordinance; the latter was by a vote with 60% in favor.

The Houston Fire Department operates Station 15 Heights in the Northside district, near the Houston Heights. It is a part of Fire District 6. Fire Station 15 moved to Houston Avenue and North Main in 1918 and North Main at Tabor in 1942. The current station at Dunbar and North Main opened in 1999.

The Houston Police Department's (HPD) Central Patrol Division serves the neighborhood. The Heights Storefront was formerly located at 1127 North Shepherd. The Heights storefront closed in 2017 as the owner of the building chose not to renew HPD's lease.

As of 2011 most of the Heights is a part of Houston City Council District C, while a portion is in District H. Because of the inclusion of the Heights, Montrose, and Rice University areas, it has the nickname "Hipstrict" for what Chris Moran of the Houston Chronicle refers to as its "progressive, urban ethic." Before the 2011 redistricting, District H included all of the Houston Heights. H was mostly Hispanic, but because of the inclusion of the Houston Heights, it was becoming increasingly non-Hispanic White. Around 2011 an earlier plan would have combined the Heights and Montrose under a district called District J.

In a 1989 Houston Chronicle article Alan Bernstein described political support for Jim Westmoreland, an incumbent in an at-large position, in the Houston Heights as "relatively weak." In one precinct 49.4 percent of the voting residents voted for him. Westmoreland drew controversy after reports of a joke that was characterized as "racist" spread. Beverley Clark, the opponent and a Black teacher, defeated Westmoreland in that race. Bernstein said that the significant racial minority groups and the "social tolerance" trait may have contributed to backlash against Bernstein. In a 1989 Houston Chronicle article, Randy Cypret, the president of the Houston Heights Association, said that the split vote from the Houston Heights may reflect the ethnic division. Cypret added that opposition may have stemmed from Westmoreland's lack of political presence in the Houston Heights and a lack of advocacy for zoning-related issues. Cypret said that he opposed Westmoreland because of "the fact that he considers being on the city council a part-time job. In the fourth largest city in the country, you should take your job more seriously."

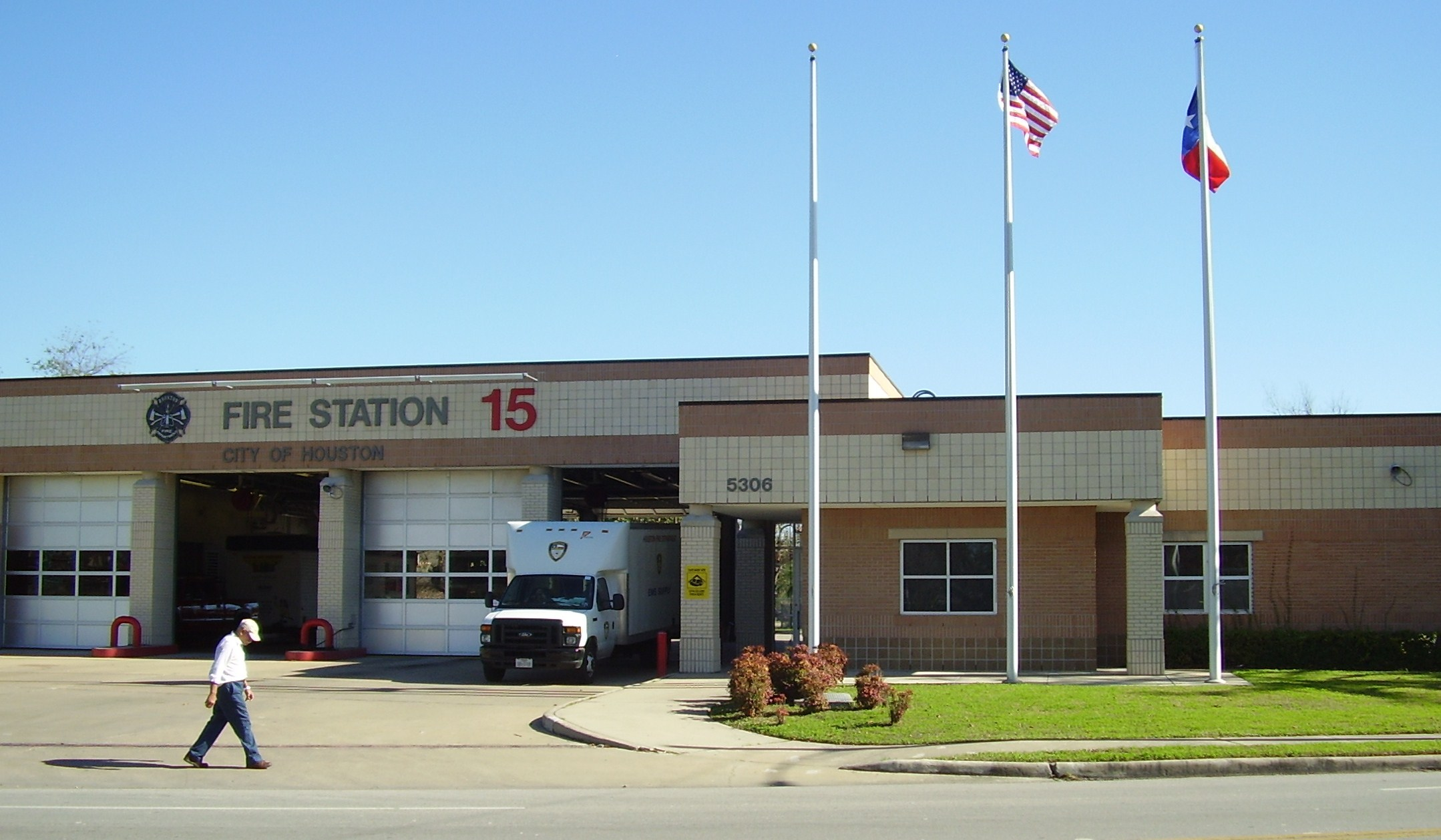
Fire Station 15 at Dunbar and N. Main

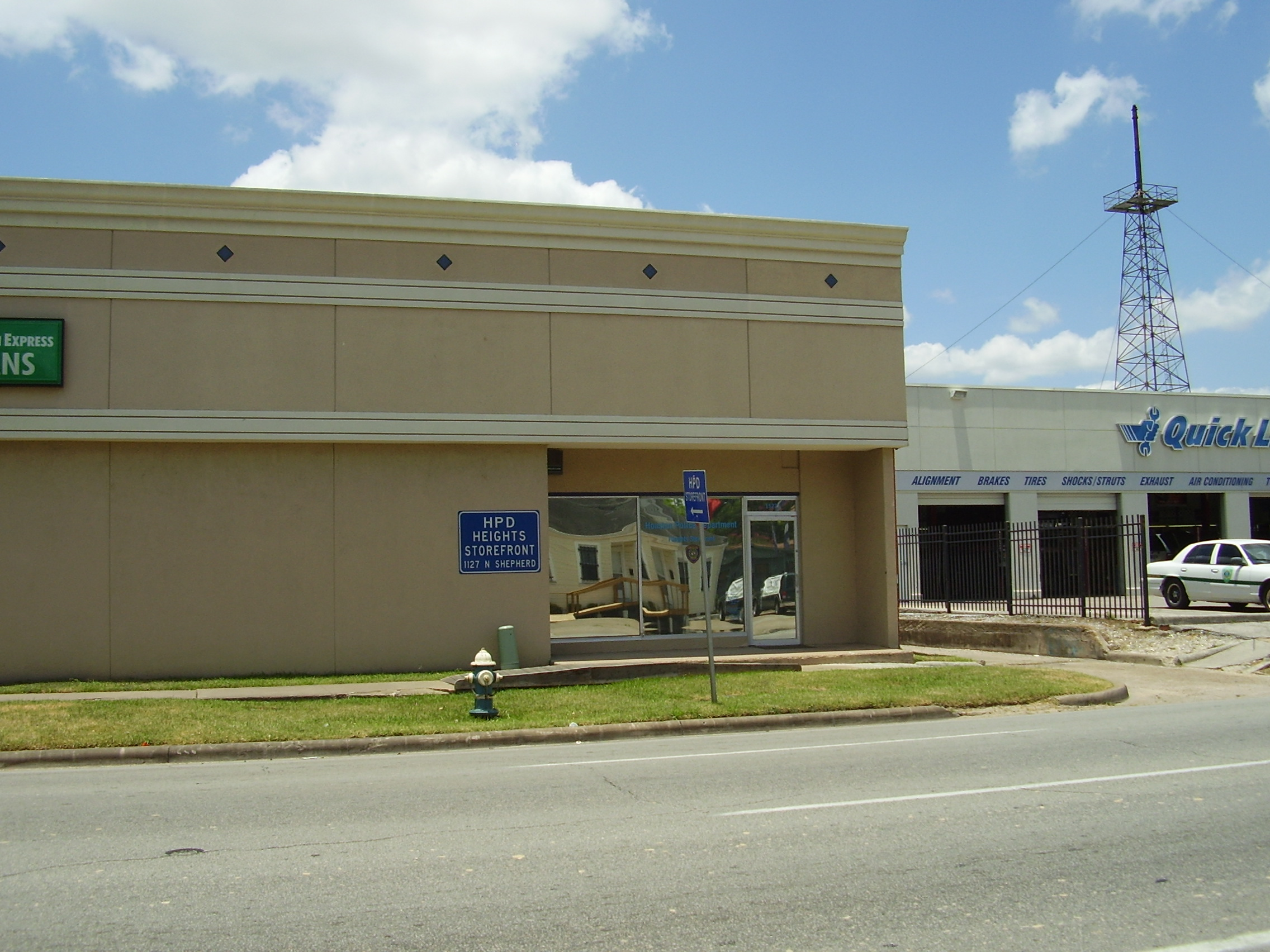
Storefront Police Station at 910 N. Durham

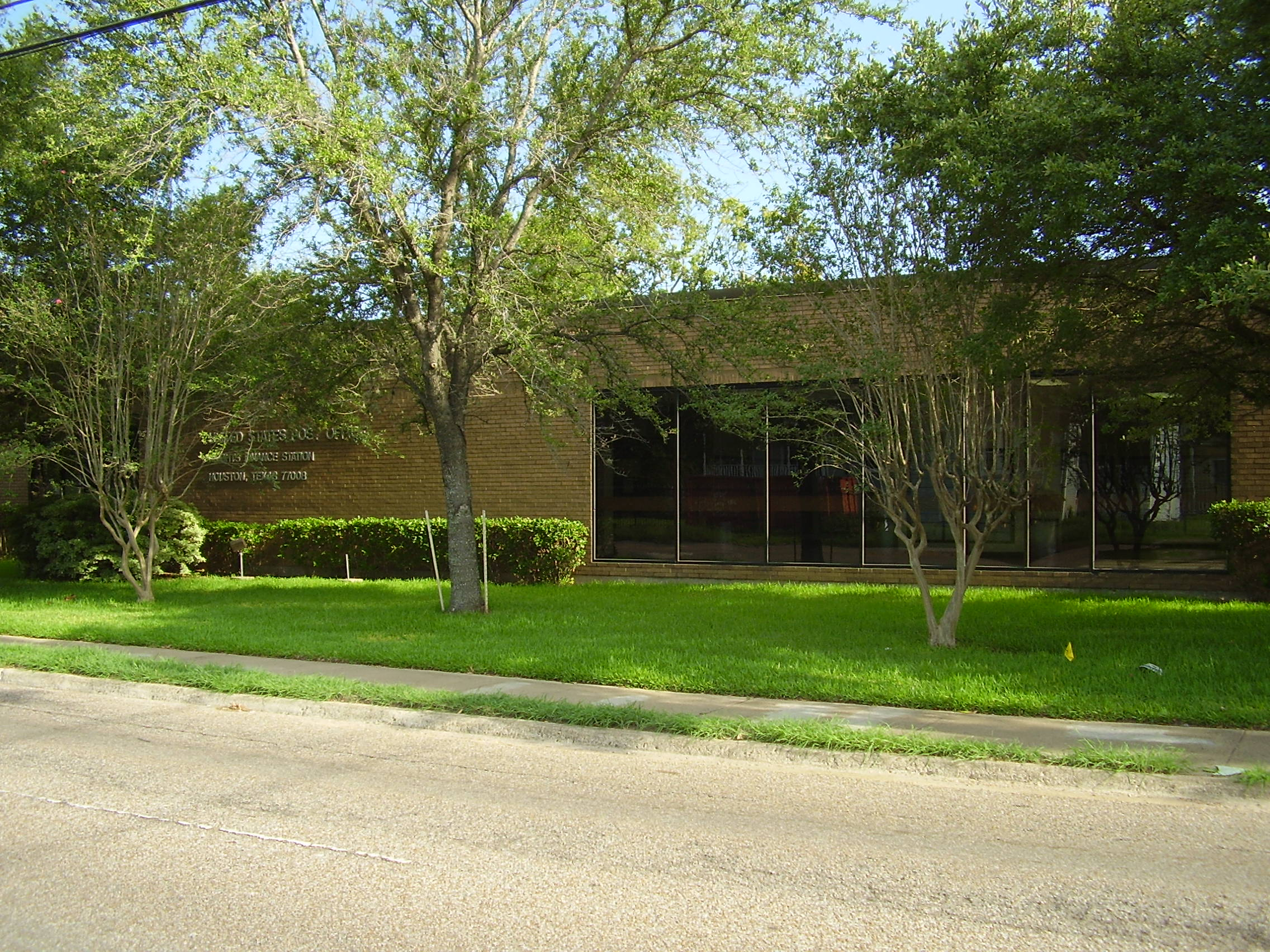
Former Heights Post Office at 1050 Yale

=== County, state, and federal representation ===
The area United States Postal Service office was the Heights Post Office at 1050 Yale Street, but the post office closed on December 30, 2015. Operations and post office boxes are moving to the TW House Station located at 1300 West 19th Street.

Harris Health System (formerly Harris County Hospital District) designated Casa de Amigos Health Center in Northside for the ZIP codes 77007 and 77008. The nearest public hospital is Ben Taub General Hospital in the Texas Medical Center.

== Demographics ==
In 2010, the research paper "Houston Heights" described Houston Heights as having a "diverse population" and in the same year National Geographic said that the Houston Heights was "home to the highest concentration of professional artists" in Texas.

Since 2000, Houston Heights has experienced widespread gentrification, which has affected the demographics of the neighborhood. In 2000, the median household income in Houston Heights was $41,576 and by 2015 it nearly doubled to $80,048. 42% of households earn over $100,000 a year. During that same time, median housing value increased from $118,758 in 2000 to $315,793 in 2015.

Ethnic demographics also shifted during this time. Between 2000 and 2015, the Hispanic population decreased from 53% to 34% and Non-Hispanic Whites increased from 42% to 58%.

In 2015, the population of the Super Neighborhood #15 Greater Heights, which includes the Houston Heights and several surrounding subdivisions , was 41,362.

=== Racial Breakdown ===
Race	Greater Heights	City of Houston
White (Non Hispanic)	58%	26%
Hispanic	34%	44%
Black (Non Hispanic)	3%	22%
Asian (Non Hispanic)	4%	7%
Others (Non Hispanic)	2%	1%

=== Age Breakdown ===
This is the age breakdown of Super Neighborhood #15 Greater Heights.

Age Group	Greater Heights	City of Houston
Under 5 Years	7%	8%
5–17 Years	10%	17%
18–65 Years	73%	65%
65 and Over	10%	10%

== Transportation ==
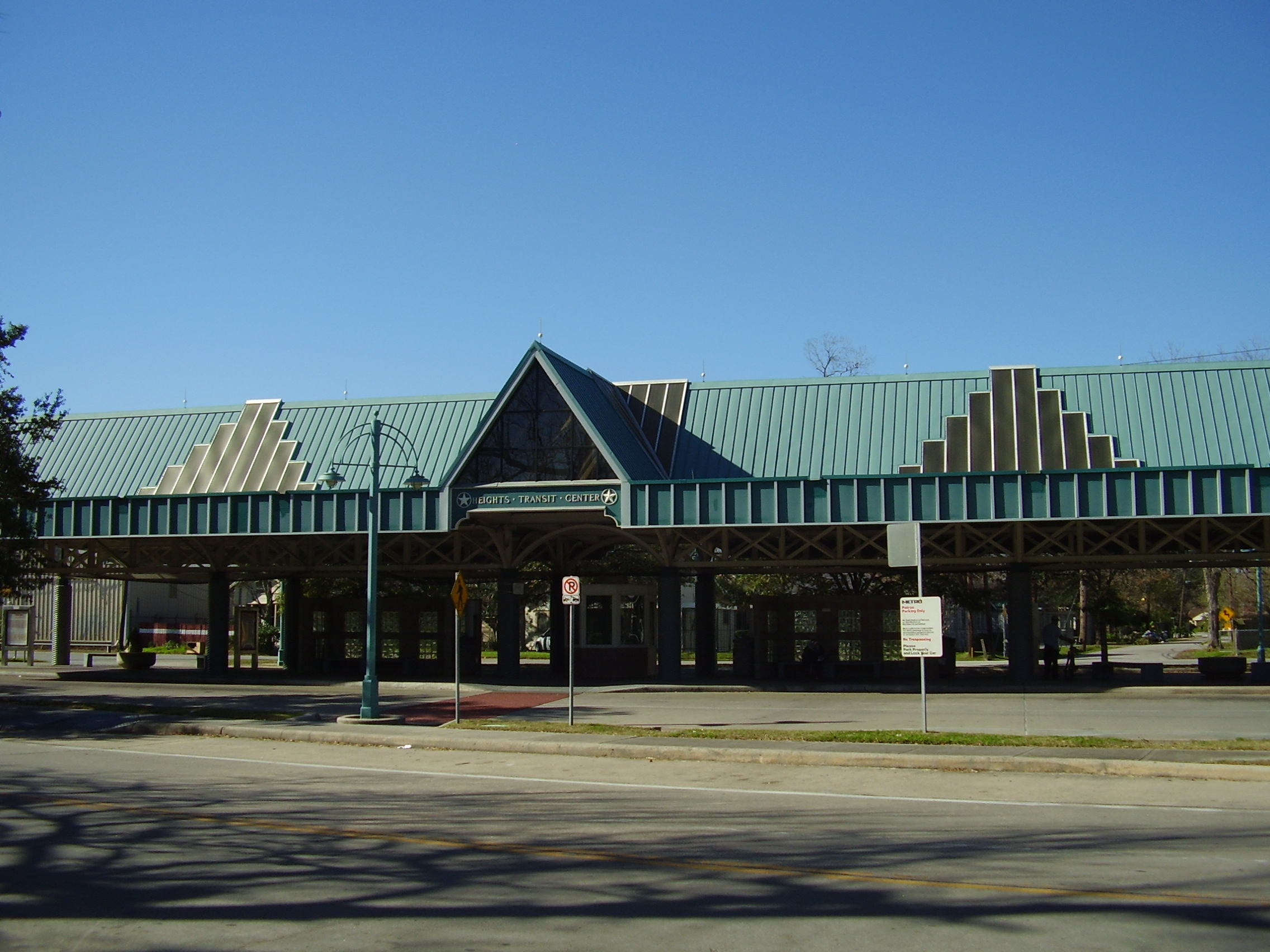
Heights Transit Center

Bike Trails : The MKT Trail is a Rails-to-Trails conversion project of 4.62 miles made up of a 10-foot wide, concrete, multi-use hike and bike trail along the old Missouri, Kansas, Texas railroad right-of-way.

The trail runs from 26th Street to 7th Street along Nicholson, and from Shepherd along 7th Street, to Spring Street, across White Oak Bayou, and under I-45, where it connects to the Heritage Corridor West Trail providing a connection to the University of Houston and other downtown bikeways and destinations.

Metropolitan Transit Authority of Harris County, Texas (METRO) formerly operated the Heights Transit Center. In 2018 the city government purchased the site from METRO. It is now Sunset Heights Park.

== Culture ==
A National Geographic Traveler article stated that the Houston Heights "maintains a quirky sense of individuality" and "flourishes as a destination for foodies, architecture buffs, and creative types."

Doug's Barbershop on 11th Street was featured in the 1998 film Rushmore, directed by Wes Anderson. Doug's has also been featured in various television and print advertisements due to its classic barbershop decor.

== Media ==
The Houston Chronicle is the citywide newspaper.

The headquarters of Houstonia magazine is in the Houston Heights.

The Suburbanite was the first ever newspaper established in the Heights. The Leader is a local community newspaper. As of 2016 Sharon Lauder publishes a monthly newspaper that was created in 1986, The Heights Tribune; businesses receive copies of this publication.

== Economy ==
Fiesta Mart formerly had a location in the Heights. H-E-B acquired the former Fiesta location in 2015, and stated it would build a store there if voters removed the 1912 ban on grocery stores selling beer and wine. The prohibitions against sales of beer and wine were repealed in a 2016 vote, and H-E-B began construction in October 2017.

== Education ==
=== Colleges and universities ===
Houston Community College provides community college services.

The Gulf Coast Bible College was located in the Houston Heights. While it was there, it tried to form its own campus by buying and tearing down houses. In 1984 the college announced it was moving to Oklahoma City, Oklahoma, doing so in June 1985. In August of that year the college was still trying to sell the Houston Heights campus.

=== Primary and secondary schools ===
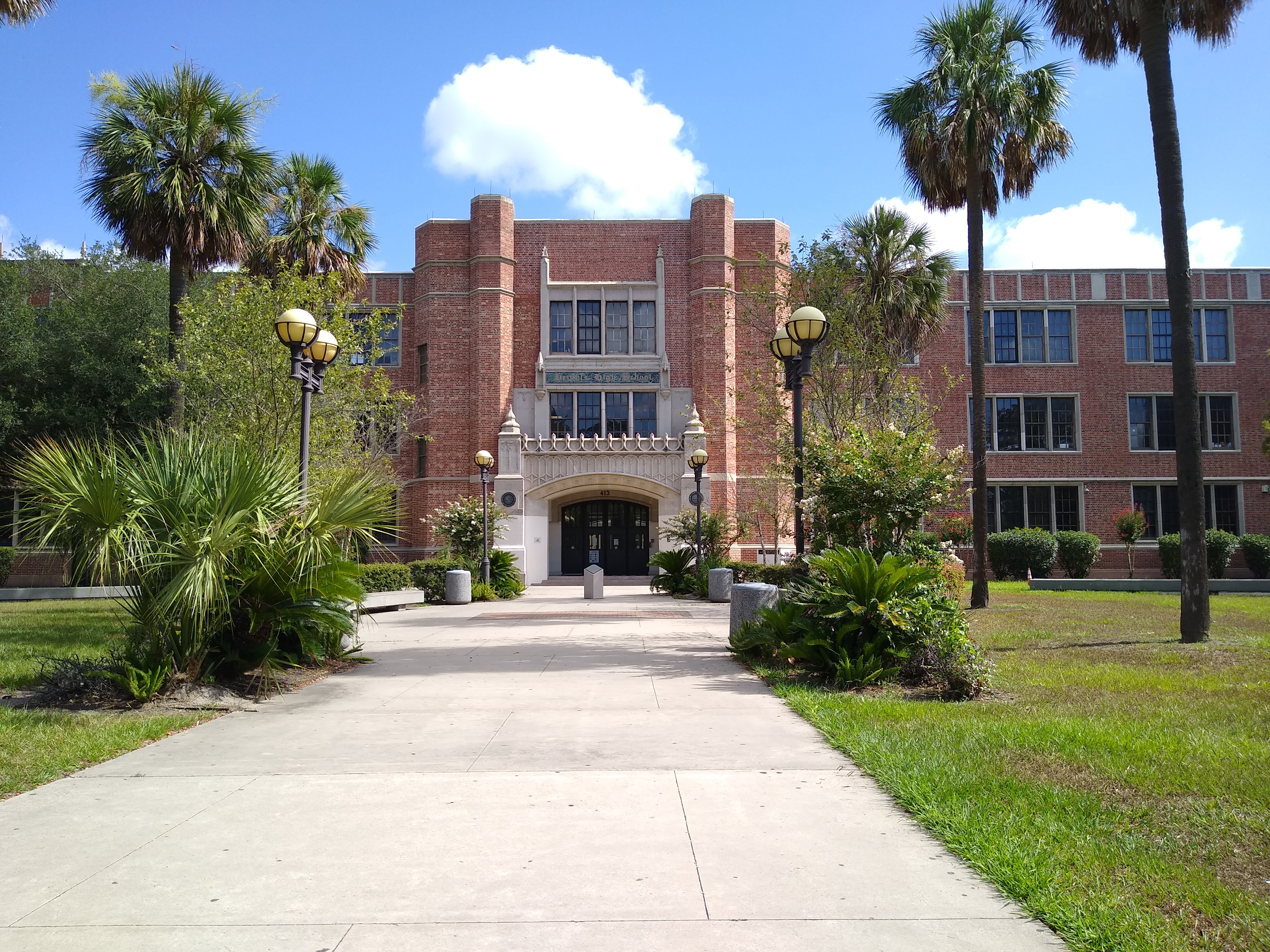
Heights High School

The Heights is served by Houston Independent School District (HISD). It is in Trustee District I, represented by Elizabeth Santos as of 2018. HISD's Central Region offices were located in the Houston Heights in the former Holden Elementary building.

Elementary schools that serve portions of the Houston Heights include Harvard, Helms Community Learning Center, Field, Love, and Sinclair. Helms is located in Heights block 76, while Harvard is in Heights block 248. Helms has a Spanish-English bilingual program that began in 1996 as a partnership with the University of St. Thomas. Shell Oil Co. founded a learning laboratory at Helms with a $500,000 grant. By 2008 the Ministry of Education of the Spanish Embassy named Helms an "International Spanish Academy". Field Elementary is in nearby Pinelawn. Love Elementary is adjacent to, but outside of, the Heights proper.

Middle schools that serve portions of the Houston Heights include Hamilton and Hogg. Hamilton is in the Heights, on blocks 71, 72, and 87; Hogg is in adjacent Norhill. High schools that serve portions of the Houston Heights include Heights High School (formerly John H. Reagan High School) and Waltrip High School. The Arabic Language Immersion School, a magnet elementary school, opened in the former Holden Elementary School location in the fall of 2015; it is located in Heights Block 21.

Two state charter schools are located in the Heights; they are: Houston Heights Learning Academy and Houston Heights High School. Three private schools, a K-9 school called The New School in the Heights, Immanuel Lutheran Church and School (K-8) and Houston Outdoor Learning Academy, a 6-12 private school, are in the Houston Heights.

Trinity Classical School has an elementary campus (PreK through 4th Grade) in the Heights.

As of 2019 the British International School of Houston in Greater Katy has a school bus service to the Houston Heights.

==== History of schools ====
The first elementary school to open in the Houston Heights was Cooley Elementary School, which opened in 1894, and was located in Heights block 131. Harvard Elementary School opened in 1898.

An elementary school for black children, which became Eighth Avenue Elementary, opened in 1911 and received its current name and final campus in 1913. The campus on Heights block 267, in 2003 served the southwest portion of the Houston Heights. It became a district-run charter school, a status sought by principal Teresa Lenoir, because the State of Texas did not grant the school permission to have early Friday dismissal to allow for teacher training, while the school had the right to unilaterally do so with charter status.

In 1914, a businessman donated land for a new elementary school, which became Love Elementary School. Helms Elementary School was built in 1918, and opened in 1921. It was named after a member of the Houston Heights school board and had a cost of $49,000. Within the Heights, the city's budget became increasingly less able to support the educational needs of the city's population. This influenced the decision to allow the City of Houston to annex the Houston Heights.

Houston Heights Senior High School opened in 1919. Harvard became a part of Houston ISD in 1921 and Love moved to its current location in 1923. In 1925 Heights High School became Hamilton High School. In 1926 Love received a new campus, Hogg opened, and Reagan opened; Hamilton became a junior high school that year. Field opened in February 1929. The final 8th Avenue building opened in 1958. Sinclair and Waltrip opened in 1959. During the same year, Twenty-Third Street Elementary School in the Houston Heights received fire damage, so it closed. In 1960 Holden Elementary School opened on the site of the former Twenty-Third Street Elementary School. In 1965, Cooley was renovated.

Cooley closed in 1980. Shortly afterwards HISD began housing offices in the Cooley building. In 1997 a small portion of the Houston Heights was rezoned to Waltrip. In 2001 Helms received its current name. Holden closed in May 2004 and students were rezoned to Sinclair and Helms; at the time 52% of students zoned to Holden were enrolled in Holden. Eighth Avenue closed after the HISD board voted to close it in 2004. Students were rezoned to Love Elementary.

Prior to Houston ISD's 2005 reorganization, the North Central District was headquartered in the Cooley Facility. It served as the headquarters of HISD's alternative certification program until 2010, when the location was sold to a home builder.

The former Holden Elementary building was used for Energy Institute High School for school year 2013-2014 and later the Arabic Immersion Magnet School.

Previously Crockett Elementary School in the Sixth Ward served a small section of the Houston Heights north of Interstate 10. A 2015 rezoning proposal was presented that would remove the portion of the Crockett boundary north of Interstate 10. These sections were rezoned to Harvard and Travis, with two students affected.

In 2015 Field Elementary applied to have a magnet program for theater and media arts.

In 2016 residents in the Love Elementary attendance area proposed adding a magnet program to Love Elementary so it could attract a wider variety of students and additional financial support from the community. As of that year it had fewer than 500 students; 88% of its students were Hispanic or Latino, 7% were white, and 89% were considered low income. Its demographics and level of financial support strongly contrast with other Heights area elementary schools.

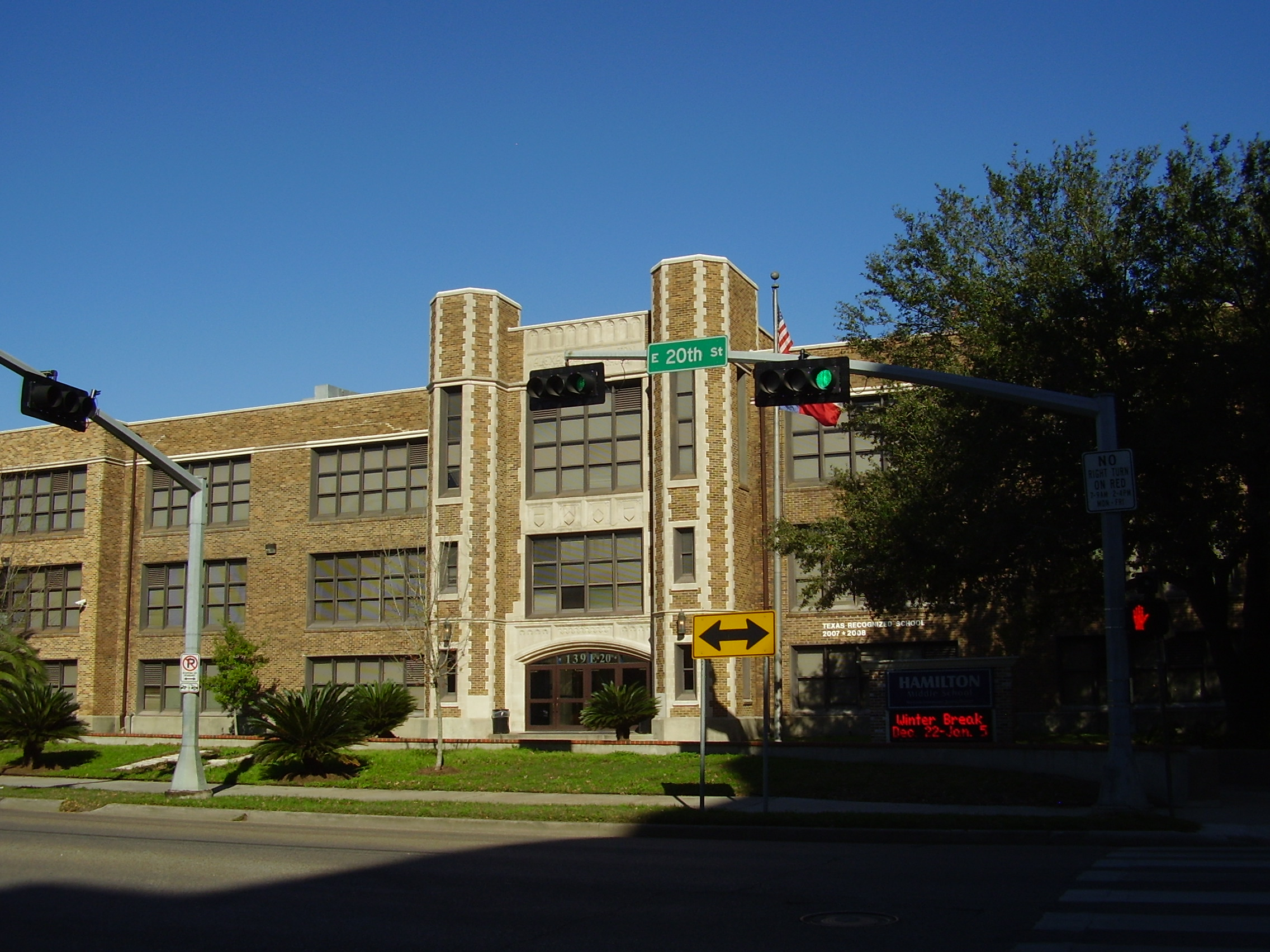
Hamilton Middle School

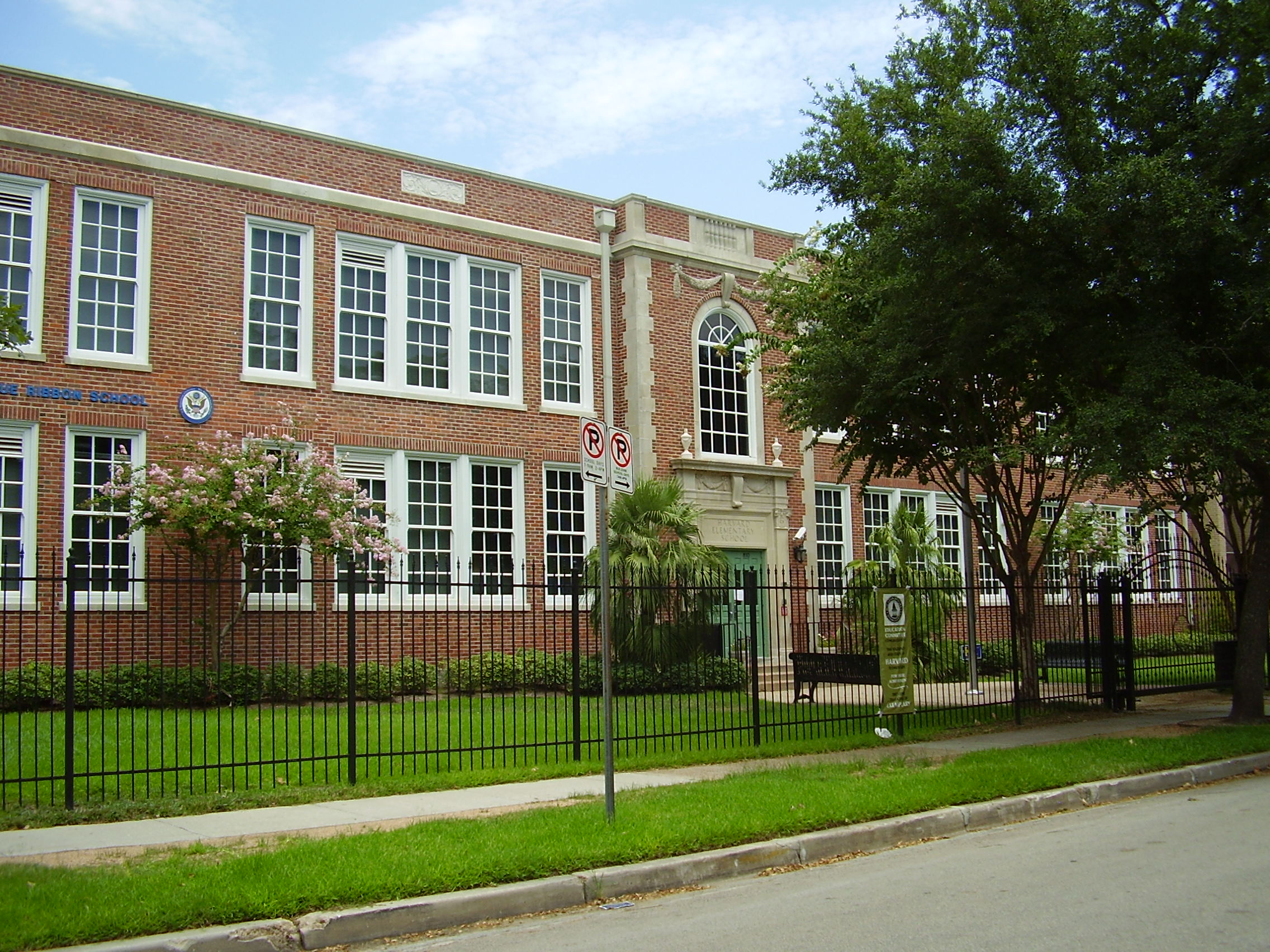
Harvard Elementary School

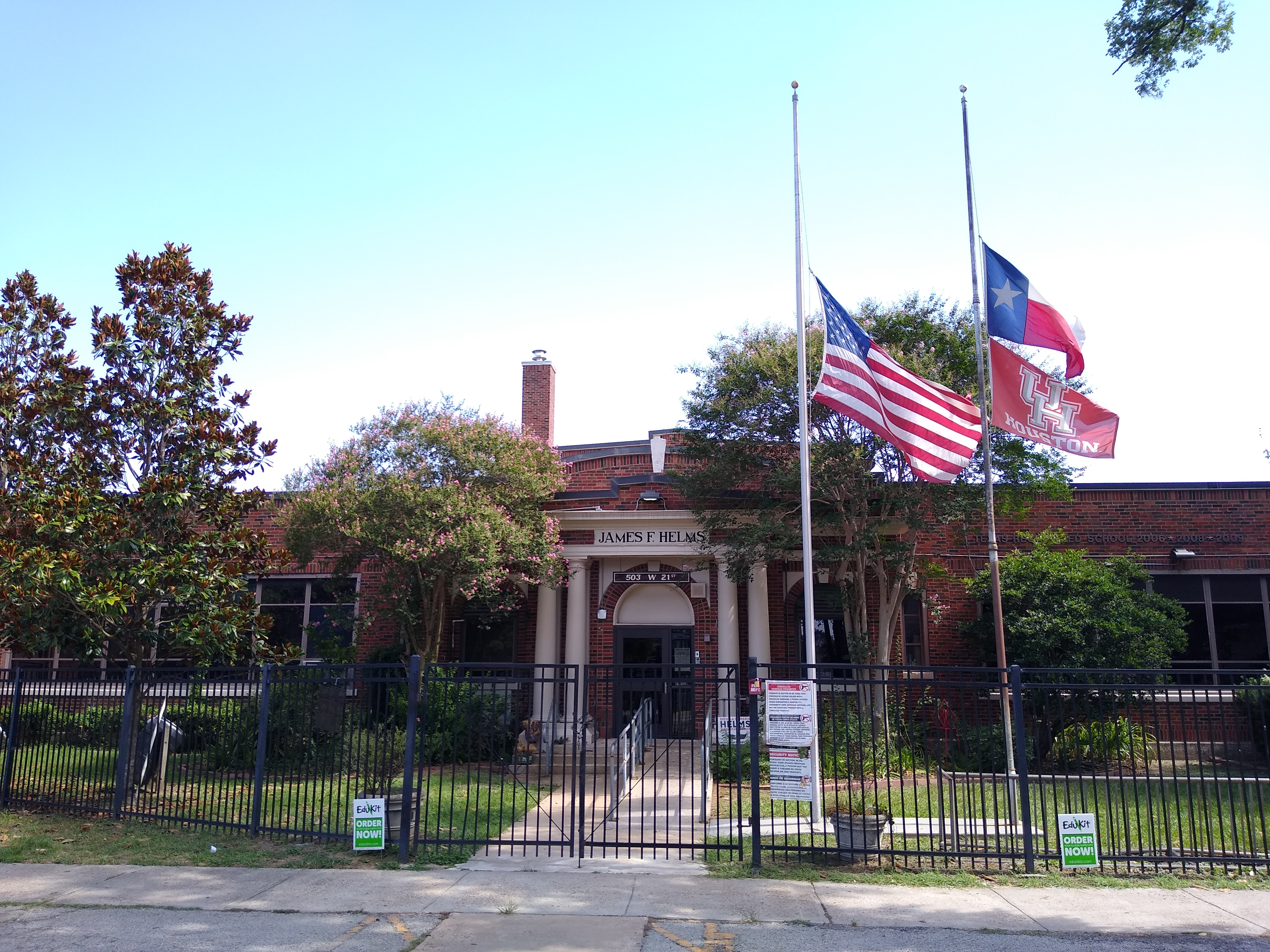
Helms Elementary School

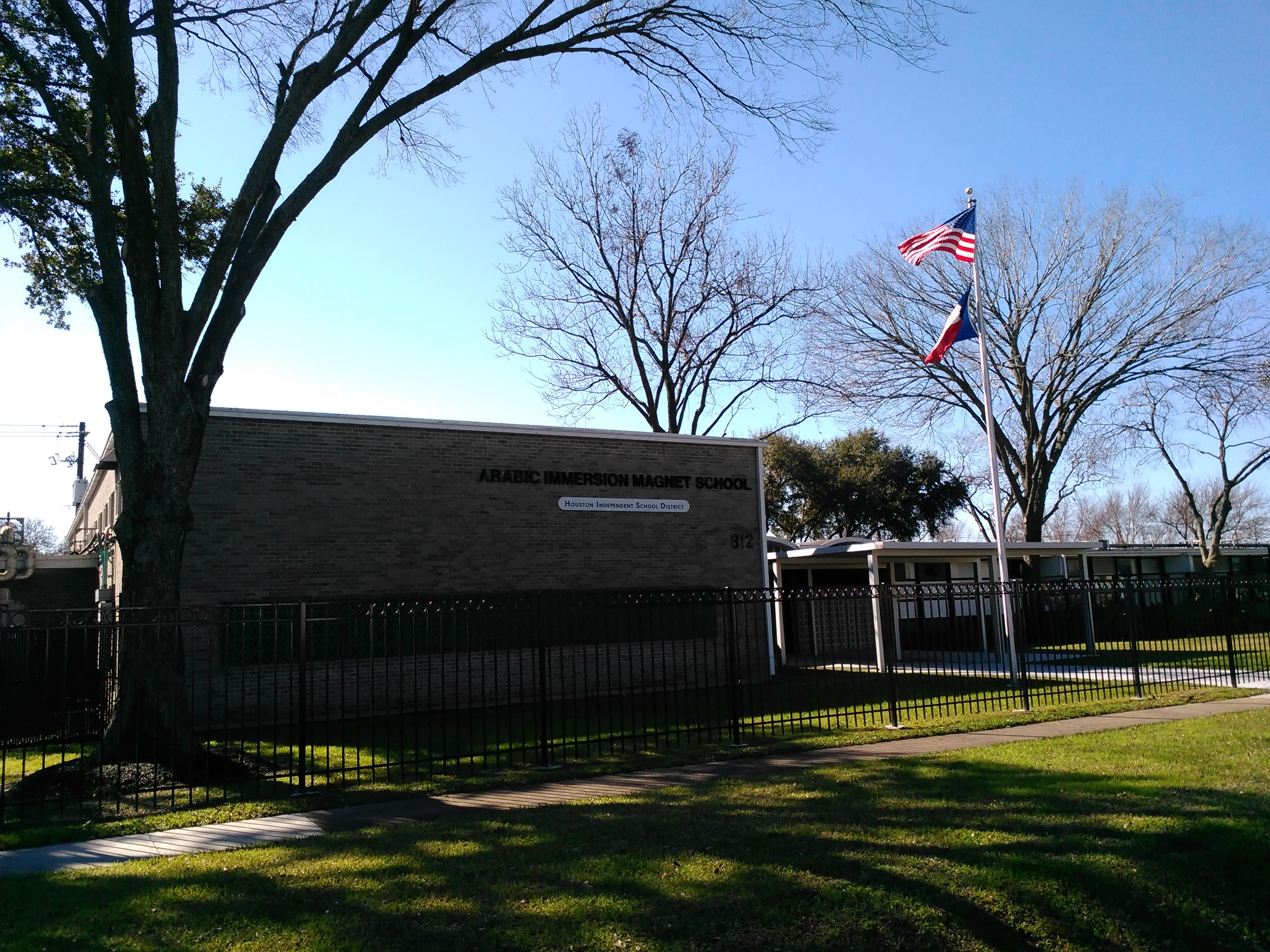
Former Holden Elementary School/Energy Institute High School/Arabic Immersion Magnet School

=== Public libraries ===
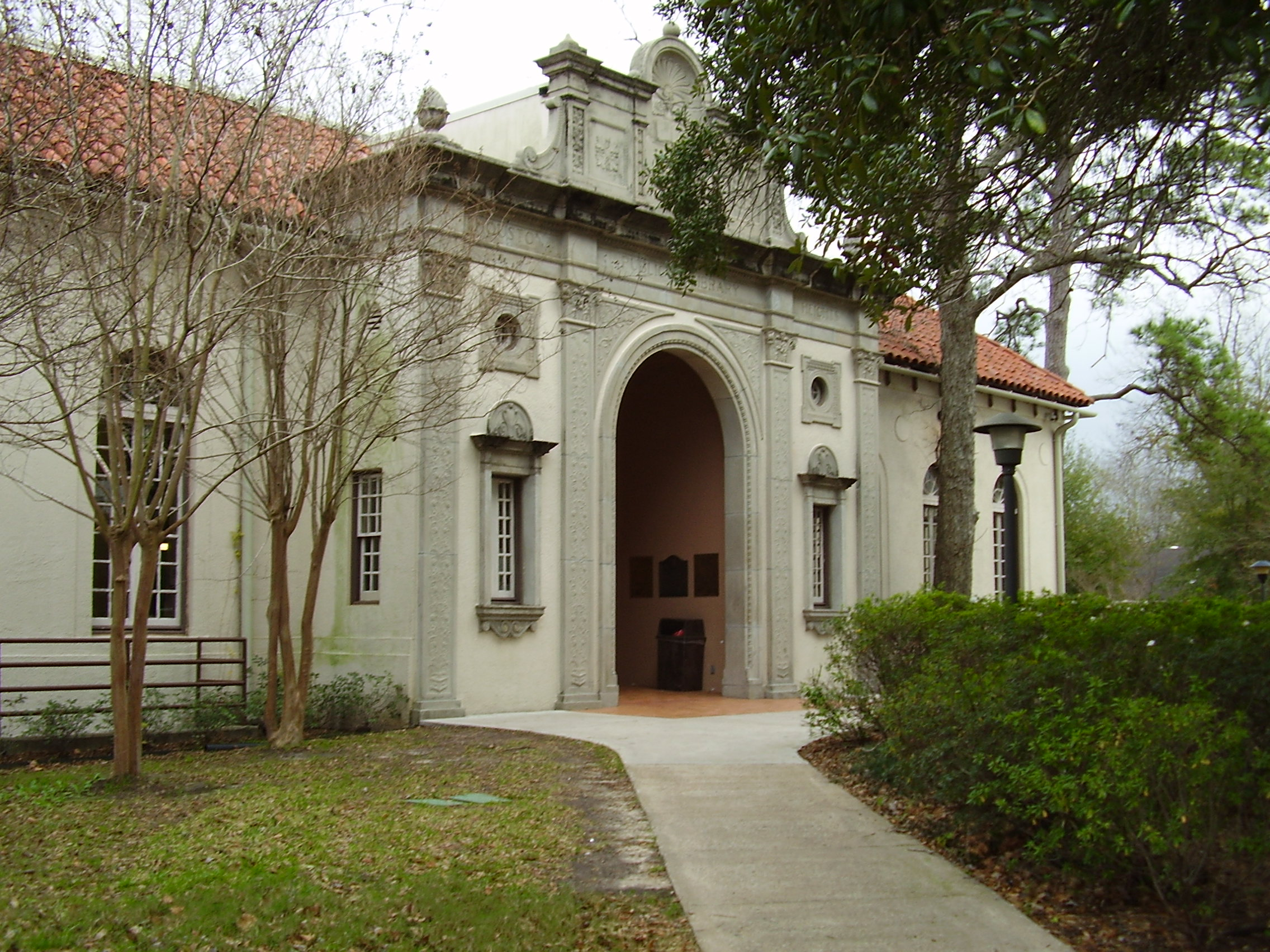
Heights Neighborhood Library

The Heights Neighborhood Library of the Houston Public Library (HPL) is located at 1302 Heights Boulevard, in Heights block 170. It has a pink Stucco Italian Renaissance façade and arches in its doors and windows. Jason P. Theriot wrote in the Houston Review that the ceilings are "high" and that the arches were "beautifully" done. Due to renovations the library has over 14,000 square feet (1,300 m^{2}) of space.

The first Heights area library facility was the Baptist Temple Library, opening in 1909, which was established by Reverend Fred Huhns. This collection moved to Heights Senior High School in 1918. The Trustees and the Heights Committee spent $7,500 to buy the land for the current facility in the mid-1920s. The current building opened in 1925 and was dedicated on March 18, 1926.

== Parks and recreation ==
The City of Houston operates parks within and around the Houston Heights. The Heights Boulevard Park is located at 100-1900 Heights Boulevard. Milroy Park and Community Center has a playground and lighted tennis courts. Milroy Park, on Heights Block 185, formerly housed the original Heights High School campus, and in 2001 it began hosting the Heights FunDay. Love Park and Community Center are adjacent to the Houston Heights. Love Park has an outdoor basketball pavilion, a 0.2-mile (0.32 km) hike and bicycle trail, a playground, a lighted sports field, and a swimming pool. Love Community Center has an indoor gymnasium, meeting rooms, and a weight room. In addition the Houston Heights World War II Memorial is located in the Heights.

The MKT/SP Heights Trail runs along the south edge of the neighborhood approximately 4.6 miles, with mixed use for pedestrians and bikers.

The Heights is the locale of Houston's White Linen Night, held annually in late July or early August.

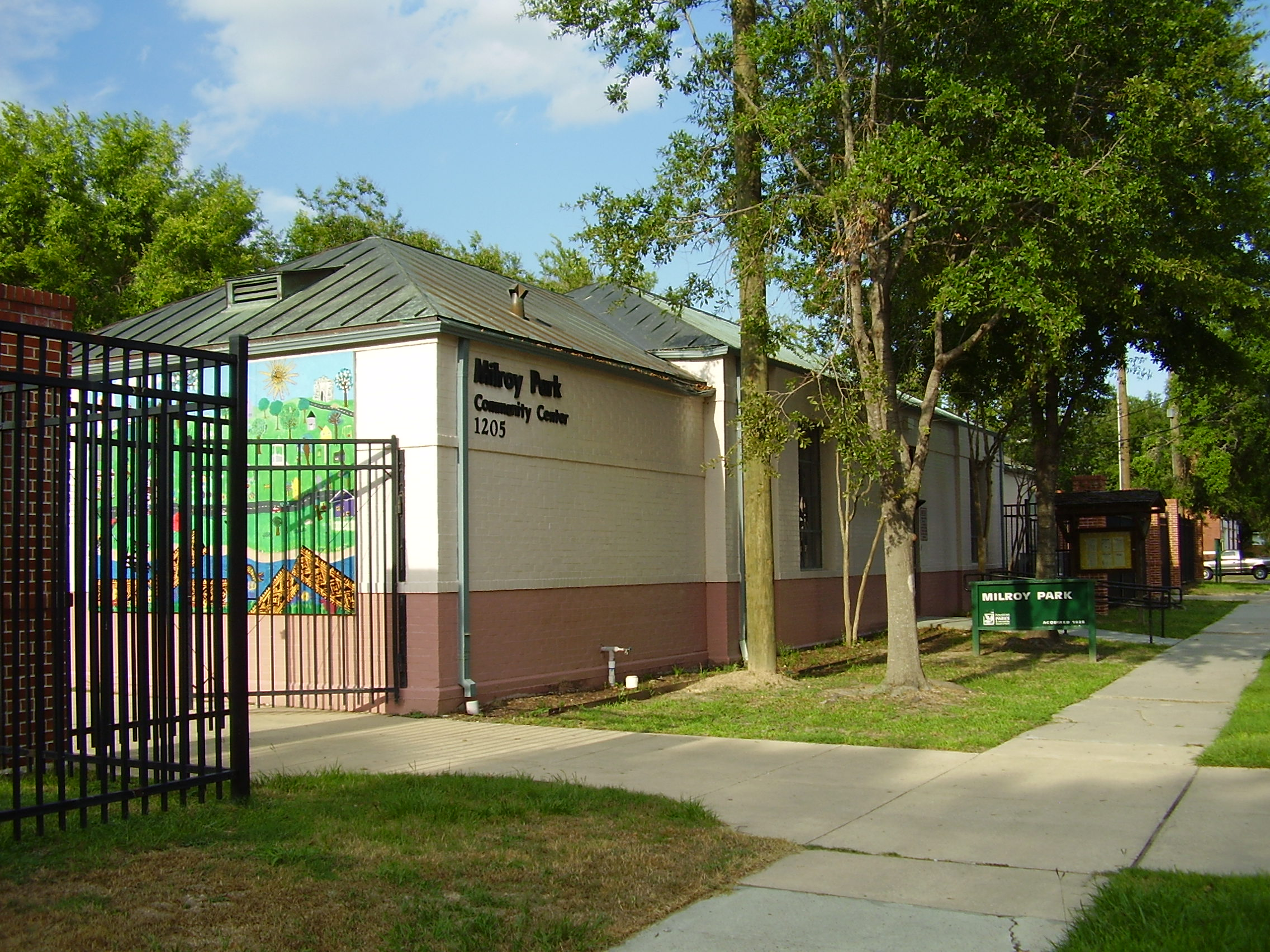
Milroy Park

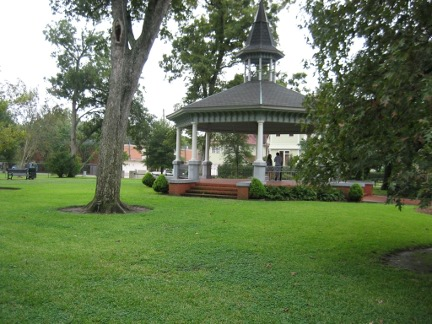
Marmion Park

== Religion ==
Churches in the Houston Heights include:

- All Saints Catholic Church (Roman Catholic Archdiocese of Galveston-Houston)
- Heights Christian Church
- Baptist Temple in the Heights

The archdiocese operates St. Anne De Beaupre Church in Sunset Heights Extension No. 2, near the Houston Heights. It was the third black church in Houston and opened in 1938.

== Community Information ==
The Houston Heights Association was organized in 1973 by residents and business owners to work together toward maintaining the quality of life and preserving the historic character of the community. The association owns several properties, one of which is Marmion Park, which is at the original location of the Cooley mansion, one of the first houses built in Houston Heights. The house was demolished in 1965. The land was purchased in 1979 by the Houston Heights Association for the purpose of constructing Marmion Park, named in honor of the last mayor of Houston Heights, J. B. Marmion.

The Houston Heights Woman's Club was founded in 1900, and constructed its own club building in 1912, which is still in use. Members were active in the suffrage movement, and later, during both World Wars volunteered the club for use by the Red Cross. Today the club volunteers in efforts to improve the Heights neighborhood, in particular mentoring children and assisting the elderly.

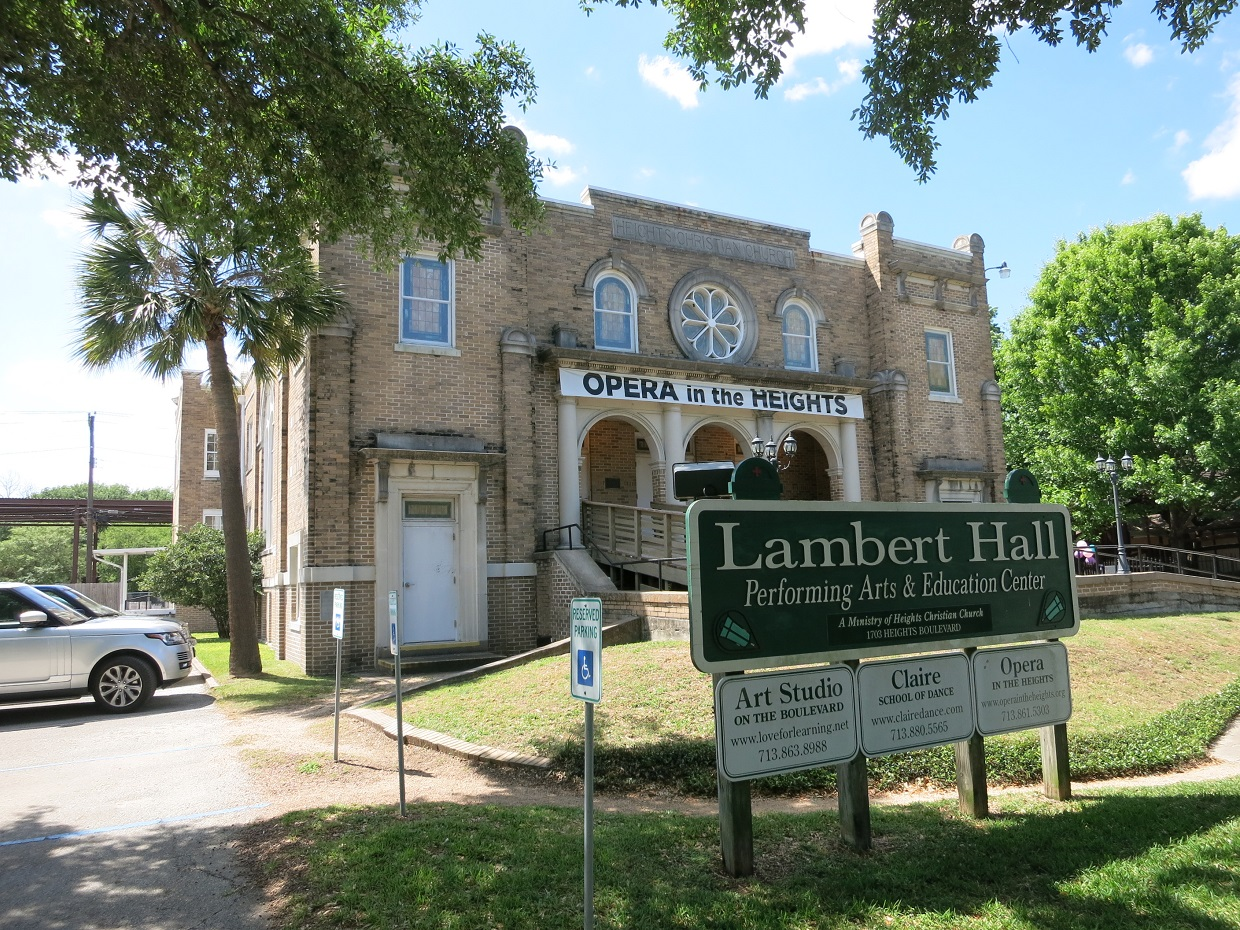
Lambert Hall, home of Opera in the Heights

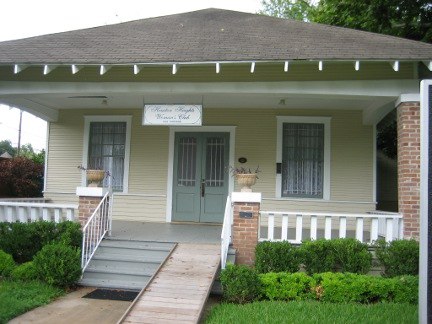
Houston Heights Woman's Club

== Climate ==
The climate in this area is characterized by hot, humid summers and generally mild to cool winters. According to the Köppen Climate Classification system, Houston Heights has a humid subtropical climate, abbreviated "Cfa" on climate maps.

== Notable residents ==
- Dan Rather - American news anchor
- Dean Corll - American serial killer
- Martha Wong - Politician
- T.C. Jester - Pastor at Baptist Temple Church resided on north side of West 20th street west of Rutland, house is painted red today
- John Ross Palmer - American artist

== See also ==
- National Register of Historic Places listings in Houston Heights, Houston, Texas
- History of Houston
- Districts and communities of Houston
- Geographic areas of Houston
