= Heights Neighborhood Library =

- Houston Public Library
- U.S. National Register of Historic Places
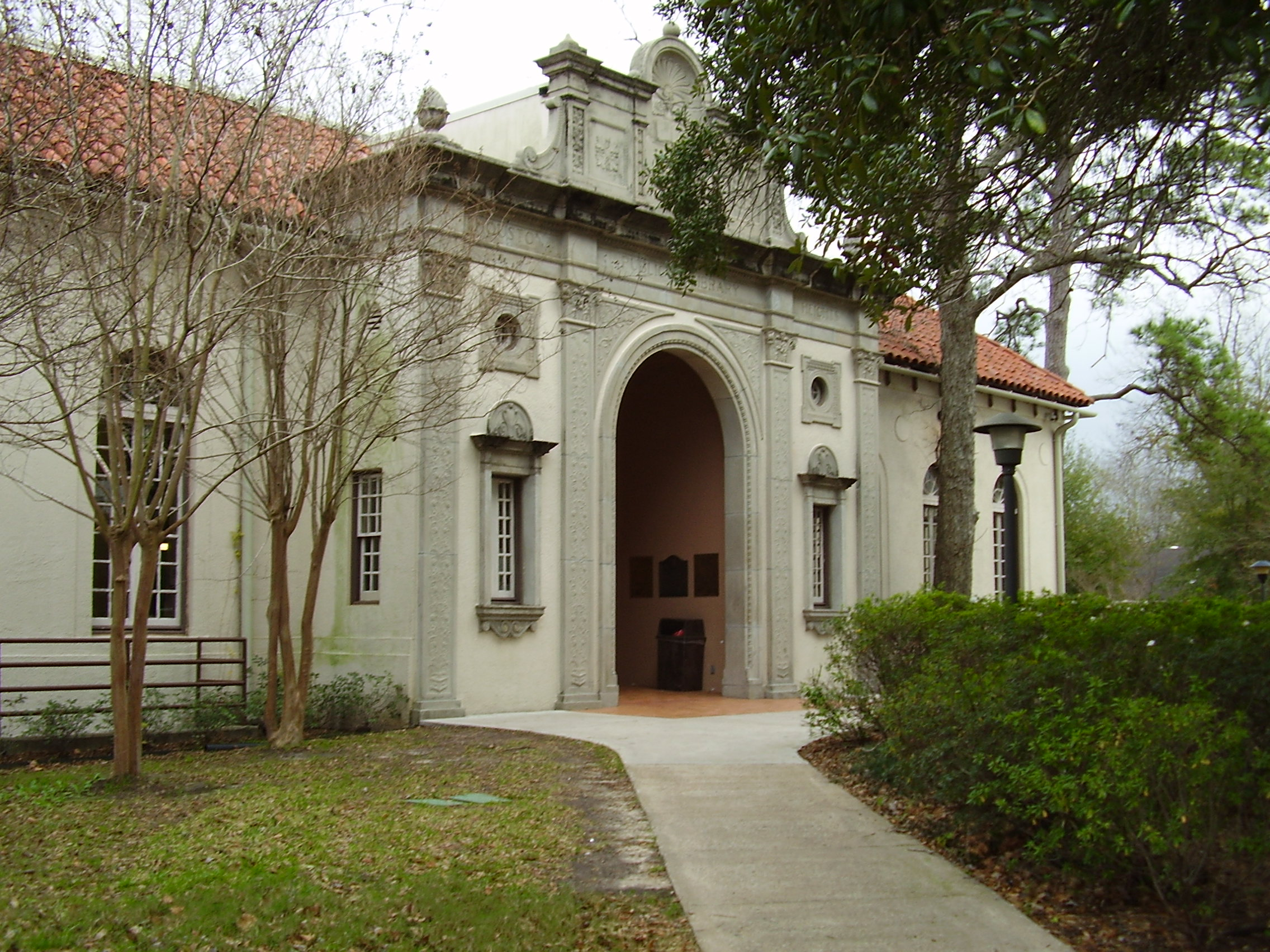
- Location: 1302 Heights Blvd. Houston, Texas
- Coordinates: 29°47′39″N 95°23′51″W
- Area: less than one acre
- Built: 1925
- Architect: J. M. Glover
- Architectural style: Renaissance; 2nd Renaissance Revival
- MPS: Houston Heights MRA
- NRHP reference No.: 84001795
- Added to NRHP: May 14, 1984

Heights Neighborhood Library is a public library facility in the Houston Heights area of Houston, Texas. It is a part of Houston Public Library (HPL) and is located at 1302 Heights Boulevard, in Heights block 170. It has a pink Stucco Italian Renaissance façade and arches in its doors and windows. Jason P. Theriot wrote in the Houston Review that the ceilings are "high" and that the arches were "beautifully" done. The library has 14,500 square feet (1,350 m^{2}) of space.

The City of Houston designated it as a protected landmark in 2005. The National Park Service added the facility to the National Register of Historic Places (NRHP) in 1984 as Houston Public Library.

== History ==
The first Heights area library facility was the Baptist Temple Library, opening in 1909, which was established by Reverend Fred Huhns. This collection moved to Heights Senior High School in 1918. The Trustees and the Heights Committee spent $7,500 to buy the land for the current facility in the mid-1920s. The current building opened in 1925 and was dedicated on March 18, 1926. It initially had 7,000 square feet (650 m^{2}) of space. Theriot stated that the library "became an instant hit". Jimmie May Hicks, an Irish American from the state of Georgia, served as the head librarian at from 1931 to 1964 and organized a collection of documents and photographs related to the Houston Heights.

In 1974 the Houston Heights Association (HHA) classified the library as a beautification project. From 1977 to 1980, an expansion project added a square footage higher than the original size, including 3,000 square feet (280 m^{2}) to the north end, since HPL deemed the existing amount of space held by the library insufficient. During the expansion the library was temporarily in an unused building in Merchant's Park. The north addition did not use the original architectural styles due to a lack of financial feasibility. Theriot wrote that the expansion "drastically altered the allure of" the original style. The facility previously had a garden in the back area established in by the Heights Womans' Club in 1939 where people may read books, but the community center room was built on top of it circa the 1970s.

In 2001 HPL considered completely replacing the building, but community outcry, including from HHA, caused the library system to instead renovate the existing facility, starting in early 2002, to Americans with Disabilities Act (ADA) standards.

The blaxploitation film Sugar Hill (1974) depicted the library as the "Voodoo Museum of Natural History."
