= Houston Heights Fire Station =

- U.S. National Register of Historic Places
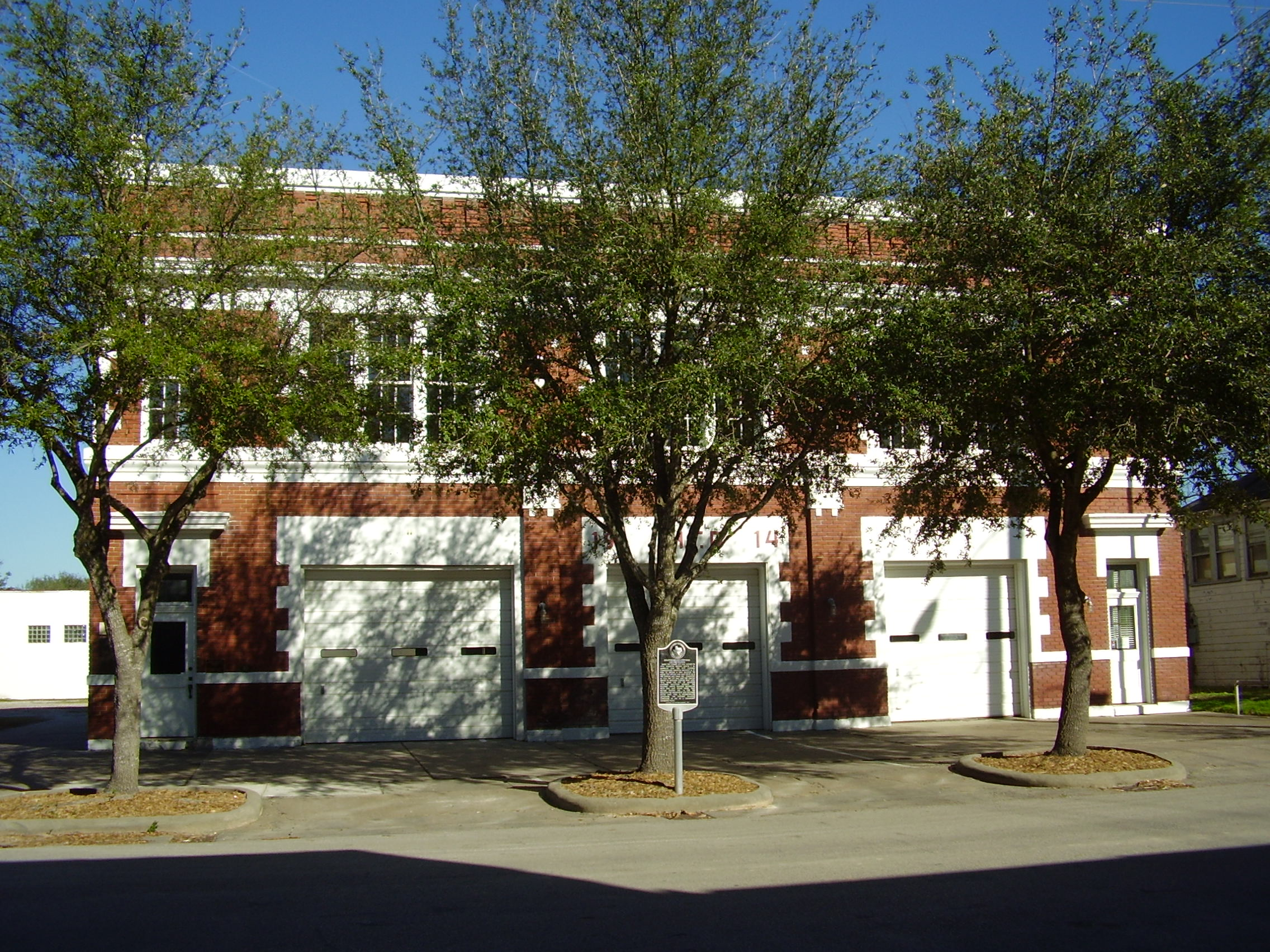
- Houston Heights Fire Station - The former city hall and fire station of the Houston Heights - Formerly Fire Station 14

- Location within Texas Location within the United States
- Location: Yale and 12th Sts., Houston, Texas
- Coordinates: 29°47′33″N 95°23′56″W
- Area: less than one acre
- Built: 1914
- Architect: Alonzo C. Pigg
- Architectural style: Tudor Revival, Other, Jacobethan Revival
- MPS: Houston Heights MRA
- NRHP reference No.: 83004461
- Added to NRHP: June 22, 1983

The Houston Heights Fire Station is a building located at 12th Street and Yale Street in Houston Heights, Houston, Texas. It was listed on the National Register of Historic Places in 1983. It is located in block #186.

It is a 7,000-square-foot (650 m^{2}) building constructed as Houston Heights' city hall and jail, and fire station in 1914. After annexation, it served as a city of Houston fire station from 1918 until 1995. It was Fire Station 14. The Houston Heights Association took a 30-year lease on the property from the city and refurbished the property. By December 2009 the former city hall was for sale.

== See also ==
- National Register of Historic Places listings in Harris County, Texas
