= T.C. Jester =

Dr. Thomas C. Jester (1884–1950) was a Baptist pastor and civic leader who impacted the formative years of Houston, TX through his leadership on the Houston City Planning Commission and the board of the Baptist Hospital. His name is bestowed on T.C. Jester Boulevard and T.C. Jester Park in Houston.

== Biography ==
Born in Camp Hill, Alabama on November 5, 1884, to John and Nancy Talbot Jester, T.C. Jester attended Southwest Baptist Theological Seminary in Fort Worth, Texas after graduating from Howard College (now Samford University) near Birmingham, AL. He was called to lead the Baptist Temple in the Houston Heights in 1927. He lived in Houston with his wife and children until his death in 1950 at age 65. Jester is buried in Brookside Memorial Park in Houston.

== City planning ==
Jester was a leading member of the Houston City Planning Commission formed in 1940 by city ordinance. The previous commission's 1929 Major Street Plan lost momentum after the committee was dissolved due to lack of funding. The 1942 plan proposed a $600,000 bond initiative to fund street widening which was adopted by the Mayor and City Council and addressed the growing problem of motor vehicle congestion. The plan continues to impact today's Houston roadways, including Telephone Road, Allen Parkway, Memorial Drive, and Interstate 610, then called Defense Loop.

Among its recommendations, the plan promoted development of White Oak Drive. White Oak Drive was later renamed T. C. Jester Boulevard after Jester's death. T. C. Jester Park later took its name from its proximity to T. C. Jester Boulevard.

== Baptist Church ==
Jester was the fourth pastor of Baptist Temple in the Houston Heights and led the congregation for over 20 years from 1927 to his death in January 1950. Under his stewardship, the church expanded its congregation and infrastructure. New buildings were constructed on Yale Street and Jester led a congregation of more than 1,500 individuals. Due to changing demographics, the Baptist Temple has since downsized.
