= John Ross Palmer =

American artist (born 1974)

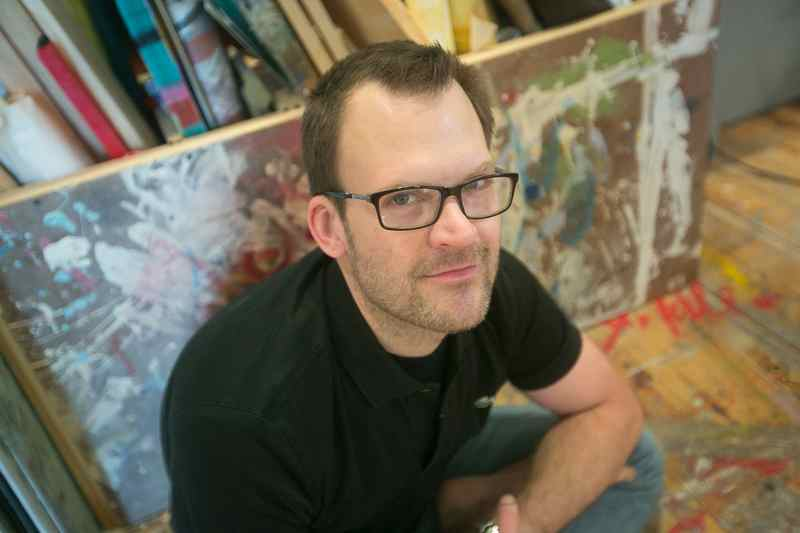
- Born: January 10, 1974 (age 52); Houston, Texas, U.S.
- Occupations: Artist, author
- Known for: Founder of Escapism art movement
- Spouse: Ryan Lindsay
- Website: John Palmer Art

John Ross Palmer is an American artist based in Houston, Texas. He is the author of numerous books and the founder of the Escapism art movement. In 2010, the Museum of Cultural Arts Houston named Palmer "Artist of the Year." In the same year, he was a finalist for the Hunting Art Prize.

== Early life ==
Palmer was born in 1974 to Ada and Gene Palmer. He is the fourth of five children, a fifth-generation Texan and a third-generation Houstonian. He worked in a variety of occupations, from landscaper to bartender, until his father's death in 1998 when he began focusing on art.

== Education ==
In 1992, Palmer graduated from Alief Hastings High School. Afterward, he attended Houston Community College.

In 2001, he studied at the Santa Reparata International School of Art in Florence, Italy. In 2003, he studied with Robert Venosa in Cadaques, Spain. In 2004, Palmer worked in art in Austria with Philip Rubinov-Jacobson and in 2005, he studied printmaking in Greece.

== Career ==
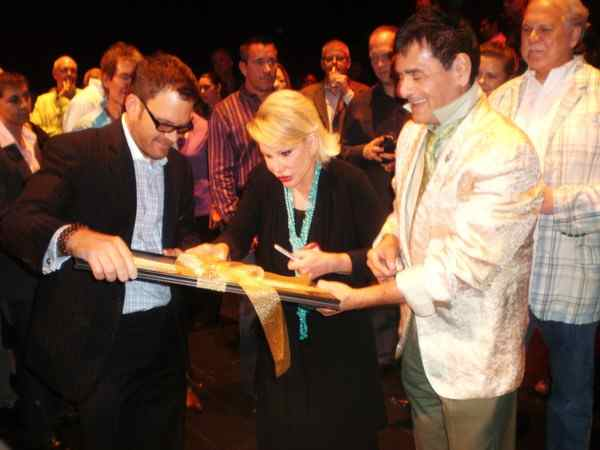
John Ross Palmer presents his artwork to Joan Rivers

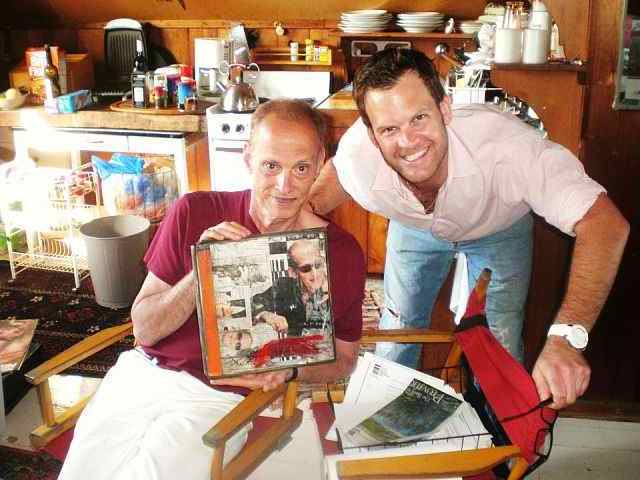
John Ross Palmer presents his artwork to John Waters

Palmer began his art career in 1998 and his work has since appeared in a variety of publications, galleries, and special collections. His work is featured in the Texas Children's Hospital in Houston, the Jung Center, the John Ross Palmer Fine Art Gallery, and his murals are displayed in Tony Vallone's restaurants in Houston. In 2012 and 2013, John Ross Palmer Fine Art Gallery participated in the LA Art Show.

In 2010, Palmer began the Escapist Mentorship Program, a no-fee program created as a way for artists to meet, and to learn about Escapism and the business of art from Palmer himself, the group's leader. The program aimed at empowering artists was "designed to defeat the idea that artists must struggle by giving them business knowledge. [It] focuses on self-promotion, business tools and setting high expectations for artists." Since 2014, the program gives artists the use of a private art studio and gallery space at the Chrysalis. As of 2018, the program is overseen by a nonprofit called Art Launch and pairs accepted emerging artists with an established artist who teaches them the business aspects of art during the year-long program.

Palmer is also the author of six books, including Escapism (2004), a book about the Escapism art movement which he founded.

In 2014, the Leadership Houston Class organization featured artwork by local artists at Houston METRO bus stops. Palmer was one of the four artists selected to have their artwork displayed for the project.

In January 2015, Palmer's Houston art gallery received corporate sponsorship through Griffin Realty and Associates. His art is in various private collections, including the Dalai Lama, Frances Fitzgeraldand and former U.S. presidents George H. W. Bush and George W. Bush. In April 2016, Palmer unveiled his art series Ocean Isle Memories at the Museum of Coastal Carolina.

== Philanthropy ==
In 2011, Palmer and former husband Ryan Lindsay created the charity of the year program at their art gallery. In 2013, Palmer hosted "fine arts day for children and teens" in association with the My Legacy Foundation. Also in 2013, John Palmer Art chose the Houston-based charity Writers in the Schools as its charity of the year. He started the "Refuse to Struggle" campaign to fund the gallery and studios for the Escapist Mentorship Program. The gallery will promote the Houston Habitat for Humanity in 2016. In 2017, Palmer teamed up with former president George H. W. Bush and his Points of Light Foundation to raise funds for volunteer efforts following Hurricane Harvey.

== Awards and recognition ==
In 2010, the Museum of Cultural Arts Houston named Palmer "Artist of the Year." In the same year, he was a finalist for the Hunting Art Prize. In 2012 and 2013, abOut Magazine awarded Palmer the F.A.C.E. Award for the LGBT community's most influential artist. In November 2014, he was recognized with the Greater Houston Service Award for volunteering to help artists though his Escapist Mentorship Program.
