= Sunset Heights, Houston =

Northern Houston neighborhood

Sunset Heights is a neighborhood in northern Houston.

== History ==
Sunset Heights Realty Co., established by Richard Rodgers, developed Sunset Heights after the company was created on August 15, 1910. The Houston Heights, when it was an independent municipality, unsuccessfully attempted to annex Sunset Heights. The City of Houston annexed Sunset Heights in 1927.

By 2001 gentrification occurred in the area, with some smaller houses being torn down in favor of newer ones.

East Sunset Heights Association was established in March 2002. By October of that year, there were 97 members.

In 2006 Sunset Heights homeowners signed a petition to the city government to establish a minimum lot size. Minimum lot sizes are pursued when area residents wish to oppose existing lots being divided into smaller ones for townhouses. Later that year the Houston City Planning commission approved the development of a condominium project that went against the wishes of the people who signed the petition even though it strictly speaking complied with the city code planning regulations. The planning commission also chose not to submit a request for deliberating the minimum lot size to Houston City Council, as seven planning commission members voted against it; six voted to do so. Tom Manning of the Houston Chronicle stated that residents disagreed on the issue. On August 8, 2007, Houston City Council did establish a minimum lot size for this area. In the Planning Commission barred a property owner from going below East Sunset Heights' minimum property size.

== Geography ==
Many of the houses in the neighborhood are bungalows.

East Sunset Heights; roughly between Airline Drive, 23rd Street, the 610 Loop, and North Main; has about 400 houses.

== Government and infrastructure ==
Harris Health maintains the Sunset Heights Clinic, a "same-day clinic".

== Education ==
The neighborhood is within the Houston Independent School District (HISD). Elementary schools serving sections of Sunset Heights include Field and Helms. All residents are zoned to Hamilton Middle School and Heights High School in the Houston Heights.

The first school established in the community was the Sunset Heights School, a part of Harris County School District 25. It was built in 1912 after taxpayers voted in favor for a referendum to build the school; the taxpayers had raised $20,000 for this purpose beginning the previous year. In 1926 the school was put in a new building and was now known as Alamo Elementary School; it was in Sunset Heights block 76. Its namesake was the Alamo. The school closed in 1980. HISD began storing items in it and later listed it for sale. Preservation Houston stated that it was an endangered historic site.

== Parks and recreation ==
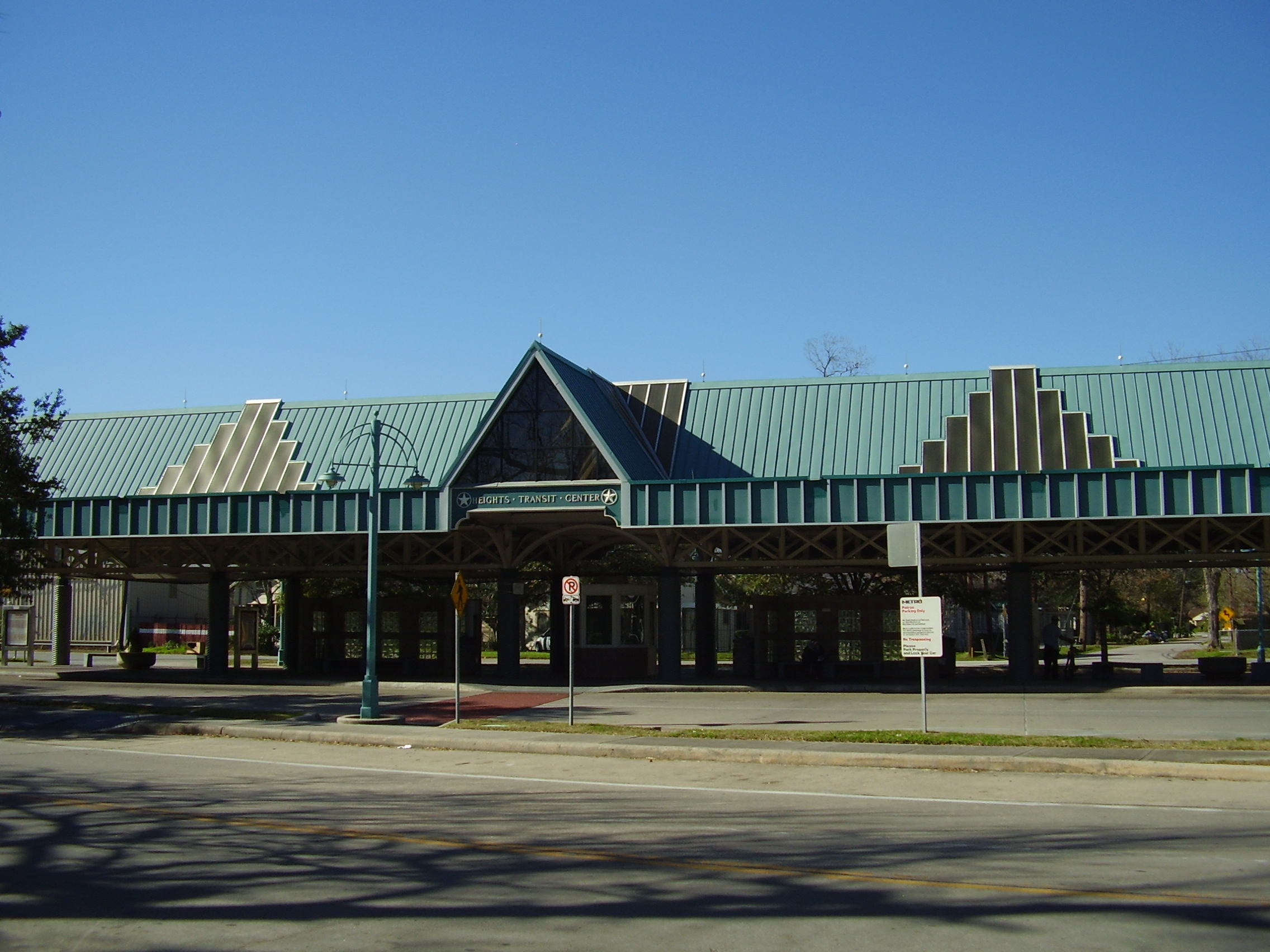
Heights Transit Center

The City of Houston acquired the former Heights Transit Center, a METRO facility, in 2018. In 2020 the city government announced the site would become the East Sunset Heights Park. It is now Sunset Heights Park.

== Religion ==
The Roman Catholic Archdiocese of Galveston-Houston operates St. Anne De Beaupre Church in Sunset Heights Extension No. 2. The third black church in the city, named after the Basilica of Sainte-Anne-de-Beaupré in Sainte-Anne-de-Beaupré, Quebec, Canada, it opened in 1938. It was initially a dependency of Our Mother of Mercy Catholic Church. The naming after a Francophone Canadian site reflects the Louisiana Creole culture.
