= All Saints Catholic Church (Houston) =

Historic church in Texas, United States

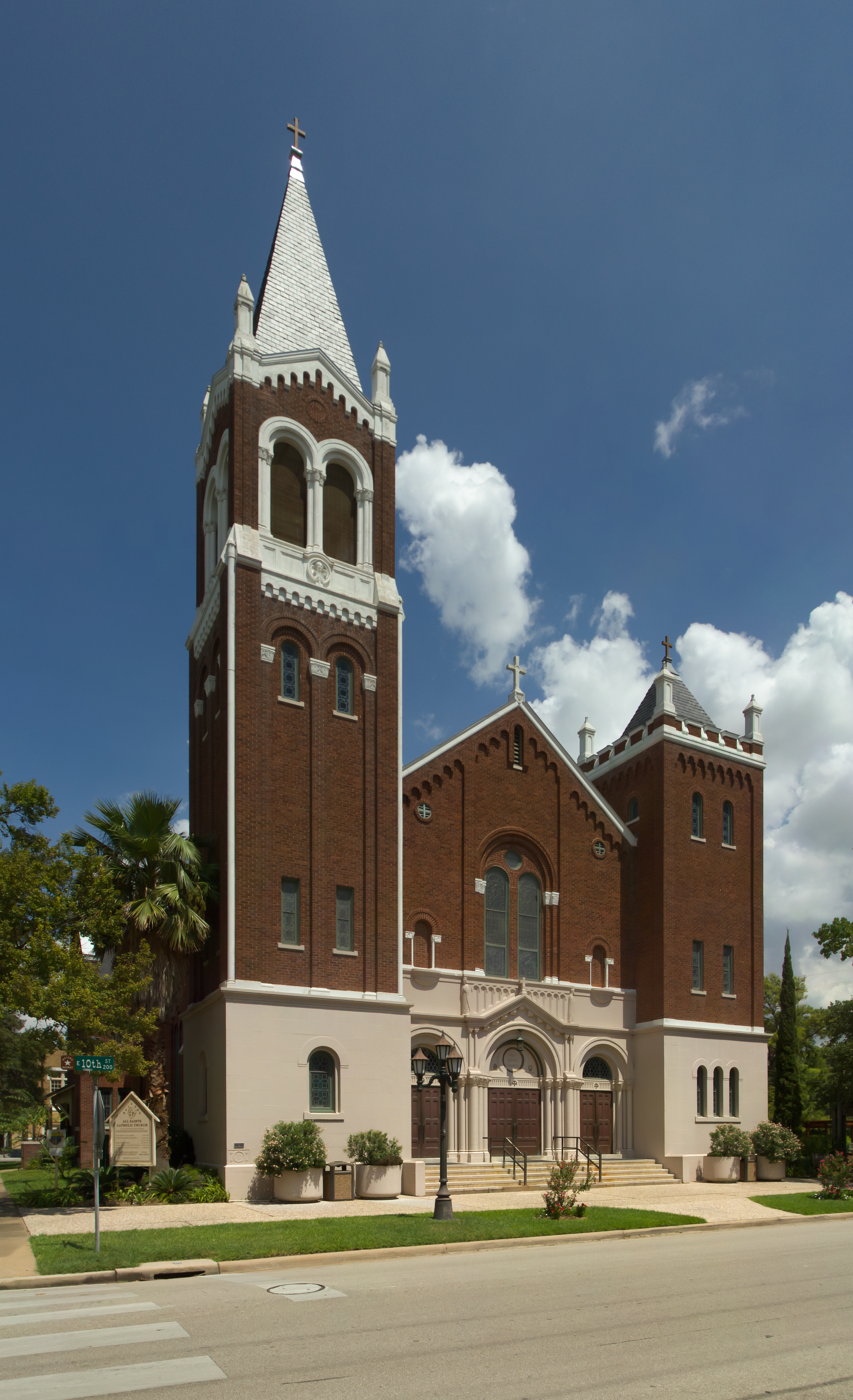

- Location within Texas Location within the United States
- Location: Houston, Texas
- Country: United States
- Denomination: Roman Catholic
- Website: www.allsaintsheights.com

History
- Status: Church
- Founded: January 1908
- Founder: Father George Walsh
- Dedicated: August 1909

Architecture
- Functional status: Active
- Architectural type: Romanesque
- Groundbreaking: March 1909

Administration
- Archdiocese: Roman Catholic Archdiocese of Galveston–Houston

Clergy
- Archbishop: Very Rev. Joe S. Vásquez
- Pastor: Rev. Elias Lopez
- All Saints Catholic Church
- U.S. National Register of Historic Places
- U.S. Historic district – Contributing property
- City of Houston Historical Landmark
- Location: Houston Heights, Houston, Texas
- Coordinates: 29°47′21″N 95°23′46″W
- Built: August 1909
- Architectural style: Romanesque
- Part of: Houston Heights Historic District (ID64000847)
- NRHP reference No.: 83004425

Significant dates
- Designated CP: July 28, 1989
- Designated HHL: July 29, 2003

All Saints Catholic Church is an historic church at 201 East 10th Street in the historic Heights area of Houston, Texas. The parish is a part of the Archdiocese of Galveston-Houston. It is in Houston Heights block 218.

The Romanesque Revival-style church building was constructed in 1926 and added to the National Register of Historic Places in 1983. It contains beautiful Italian stained glass windows. In 2013, iconographer Br. Robert Lentz, OFM, completed the last of 14 icons that adorn the icon wall behind the altar.

As of 2014, the congregation numbers about 2,000 families (5,000 people). The pastor since 1999 is Rev. Msgr. Adam McClosky, a native of Anderson, Texas and a priest of the archdiocese.

All Saints was organized in January 1908 in what was then known as the “Village of the Heights.” The founding pastor, Father George Walsh, commuted from Galveston and celebrated Eucharist in the Fraternal Hall at 12th and Yale, the site where the Fire Station is now located.

In March 1909, the cornerstone of the first church was laid at 10th and Harvard. The church was dedicated by Bishop Gallagher in August 1909. The seating capacity of the church was 300, and the parish numbered 650 families. All Saints School was opened in 1913 and the two sacristies in the church were used as classrooms. A small two room school building was built by the people of the parish and was finished in 1914. This school was operated by the Dominican Sisters, who commuted from St. Agnes Academy located on Fannin Street. The two-story brick school building was completed in 1922. This building is still used as CCE classrooms, nursery, and St. Vincent de Paul Food Pantry.

The present Gothic church and the Rectory were dedicated in 1928, and are still occupied for these purposes. The combination auditorium and cafeteria was built in 1949 to accommodate the increased school enrollment and other parish activities. This building is now the parish hall.

As the parish grew, so also did the school. The additional classrooms, now the Third Age Learning Center, were constructed in 1959. A convent, a living area for eight sisters teaching in the school, was built in 1960. This building has been used as the Parish Office since 1986, when the school was closed because of financial difficulties.

In 1974, All Saints entered into a joint venture with other religious denominations in the Heights area to build the Heights Tower located on 19th Street, a $3-million, non-profit senior citizen residence.
