= National Register of Historic Places listings in downtown Houston, Texas =

This is a list of the National Register of Historic Places in downtown Houston, Texas. It is intended to be a complete list of properties and districts listed on the National Register of Historic Places in the Downtown Houston neighborhood, defined as the area enclosed by Interstate 10, Interstate 45, and Interstate 69.

The locations of National Register properties and districts (at least for all showing latitude and longitude coordinates below) may be seen in a map by clicking on "Map of all coordinates."

Contents: NRHP listings by area in Harris County
downtown Houston - Houston Heights - inner Harris County - outer Harris County

This National Park Service list is complete through NPS recent listings posted June 6, 2026.

== Current listings ==
	Name on the Register	Image	Date listed	Location	City or town	Description
1	1884 Houston Cotton Exchange Building	1884 Houston Cotton Exchange Building	May 6, 1971 (#71000938)	202 Travis St. 29°45′49″N 95°21′40″W	Houston	
2	500 Jefferson Building	500 Jefferson Building	March 6, 2019 (#100003492)	500 Jefferson St. 29°45′11″N 95°22′25″W	Houston	
3	Annunciation Church	Annunciation Church	November 3, 1975 (#75001988)	1618 Texas Ave. 29°45′23″N 95°21′25″W	Houston	
4	Antioch Missionary Baptist Church	Antioch Missionary Baptist Church	December 22, 1976 (#76002038)	500 Clay St. 29°45′23″N 95°22′19″W	Houston	
5	Battelstein's	Battelstein's	February 6, 2020 (#100004966)	812 Main St. 29°45′29″N 95°21′51″W	Houston	
6	Beaconsfield	Beaconsfield	March 29, 1983 (#83004428)	1700 Main St. 29°45′20″N 95°22′21″W	Houston	
7	James Bute Company Warehouse	James Bute Company Warehouse	July 7, 1994 (#94000677)	711 William St. 29°46′02″N 95°21′14″W	Houston	
8	Christ Church	Christ Church	June 15, 1979 (#79002957)	1117 Texas Ave. 29°45′34″N 95°21′39″W	Houston	
9	City National Bank Building	City National Bank Building	April 3, 2000 (#00000291)	1001 McKinney Ave. 29°45′25″N 95°21′51″W	Houston	
10	Arthur B. Cohn House	Arthur B. Cohn House	November 7, 1985 (#85002771)	900 block of Avenida De Las Americas; 29°45′20″N 95°21′22″W	Houston	Relocated from original location one block south
11	Commerce Street Warehouse Historic District		June 12, 2026 (#100013148)	Roughly bounded by Crawford Street on the northwest, Ruiz Street on the northeast, the rear property lines along Chenevert Street on the southeast, and Franklin Street on the southwest 29°45′36″N 95°21′13″W	Houston	
12	Downtown Houston Post Office		February 2, 2018 (#100002087)	401 Franklin St. 29°45′54″N 95°21′53″W	Houston	Now known as POST Houston
13	First City National Bank		January 20, 2026 (#100012566)	1021 Main Street and 1101 Fannin Street; 29°45′22″N 95°21′52″W	Houston	
14	W. L. Foley Building	W. L. Foley Building	October 11, 1978 (#78002942)	214-218 Travis St. 29°45′47″N 95°21′41″W	Houston	
15	Gulf Building	Gulf Building	August 30, 1983 (#83004436)	710-724 Main St. 29°46′04″N 95°21′50″W	Houston	
16	Harris County Courthouse of 1910	Harris County Courthouse of 1910	May 13, 1981 (#81000629)	301 Fannin St. 29°45′40″N 95°21′34″W	Houston	
17	Hogg Building	Hogg Building	July 14, 1978 (#78002943)	401 Louisiana St. 29°45′45″N 95°21′50″W	Houston	
18	Houston Bar Center Building	Houston Bar Center Building	June 26, 2017 (#100001254)	723 Main St. 29°45′36″N 95°22′09″W	Houston	
19	Houston City Hall	Houston City Hall	September 18, 1990 (#90001471)	901 Bagby St. 29°45′36″N 95°22′09″W	Houston	
20	Houston Post-Dispatch Building	Houston Post-Dispatch Building	February 14, 2002 (#02000072)	609 Fannin; 29°45′32″N 95°21′41″W	Houston	
21	Humble-Exxon Building	Humble-Exxon Building	January 31, 2025 (#100011429)	800 Bell Street and 1616 Milam Street; 29°45′13″N 95°22′10″W	Houston	
22	Humble Oil Building	Humble Oil Building	January 27, 1999 (#99000068)	1212 Main St. 29°45′18″N 95°22′00″W	Houston	
23	Julia Ideson Building	Julia Ideson Building	November 23, 1977 (#77001447)	500 McKinney St. 29°45′32″N 95°22′09″W	Houston	
24	Kellum-Noble House	Kellum-Noble House	April 3, 1975 (#75001989)	212 Dallas St. 29°45′31″N 95°22′19″W	Houston	
25	Kennedy Bakery	Kennedy Bakery	July 27, 1979 (#79002963)	813 Congress St. 29°45′46″N 95°21′41″W	Houston	
26	Kress Building	Kress Building	October 4, 2002 (#02001102)	705 Main St. 29°45′31″N 95°21′46″W	Houston	
27	Main Street/Market Square Historic District	Main Street/Market Square Historic District	July 18, 1983 (#83004471)	Roughly bounded by Buffalo Bayou, Fannin, Texas, and Milam streets 29°45′47″N 95°21′40″W	Houston	
28	McKee Street Bridge	McKee Street Bridge	September 3, 2002 (#02000729)	McKee St. and Buffalo Bayou; 29°45′57″N 95°21′07″W	Houston	
29	Melrose Building	Melrose Building	September 17, 2014 (#14000627)	1121 Walker; 29°45′25″N 95°21′46″W	Houston	
30	Merchants and Manufacturers Building	Merchants and Manufacturers Building	September 17, 1980 (#80004130)	University of Houston–Downtown; 1 Main St. 29°45′57″N 95°21′32″W	Houston	
31	National Biscuit Company Building	National Biscuit Company Building	February 20, 1998 (#98000141)	15 N. Chenevert; 29°45′36″N 95°21′08″W	Houston	
32	Old Houston National Bank	Old Houston National Bank	July 17, 1975 (#75001990)	202 Main St. 29°45′47″N 95°21′38″W	Houston	Now the Islamic Da’wah Center
33	Palace Hotel	Palace Hotel	September 13, 2006 (#06000825)	216 La Branch; 29°45′44″N 95°21′24″W	Houston	
34	Paul Building	Paul Building	April 6, 1979 (#79002967)	1018 Preston Ave. 29°45′39″N 95°21′39″W	Houston	
35	Petroleum Building	Petroleum Building	August 8, 2019 (#100004250)	1314 Texas Avenue; 29°45′28″N 95°21′34″W	Houston	
36	Rice Hotel	Rice Hotel	June 23, 1978 (#78002947)	Main St. and Texas Ave. 29°45′37″N 95°21′46″W	Houston	
37	Sam Houston Hotel	Sam Houston Hotel	April 17, 2002 (#02000276)	1117 Prairie St. 29°45′42″N 95°21′37″W	Houston	Now known as Alden Houston.
38	San Jacinto Street Bridge over Buffalo Bayou	San Jacinto Street Bridge over Buffalo Bayou	October 16, 2007 (#07001098)	San Jacinto St. at Buffalo Bayou; 29°45′53″N 95°21′27″W	Houston	
39	Scanlan Building	Scanlan Building	May 23, 1980 (#80004132)	405 Main St. 29°45′40″N 95°21′40″W	Houston	
40	South Texas National Bank	South Texas National Bank	December 8, 1978 (#78002948)	215 Main St. 29°45′44″N 95°21′36″W	Houston	Demolished in 1983
41	Southwestern Bell Capitol Main Office	Southwestern Bell Capitol Main Office	August 25, 2016 (#16000574)	1121 Capitol St. & 1114 Texas Ave. 29°45′31″N 95°21′41″W	Houston	
42	State National Bank Building	State National Bank Building	August 11, 1982 (#82004843)	412 Main St. 29°45′40″N 95°21′42″W	Houston	
43	Stowers Building	Stowers Building	June 3, 2015 (#15000335)	820 Fannin; 29°45′27″N 95°21′49″W	Houston	
44	Sweeney, Coombs & Fredericks Building	Sweeney, Coombs & Fredericks Building	June 20, 1974 (#74002074)	301 Main St. 29°45′43″N 95°21′38″W	Houston	
45	Texas Company Building	Texas Company Building	April 2, 2003 (#03000185)	1111 Rusk; 29°45′28″N 95°21′46″W	Houston	
46	Texas State Hotel	Texas State Hotel	January 10, 2008 (#07001384)	720 Fannin; 29°45′28″N 95°21′46″W	Houston	
47	U.S. Customhouse	U.S. Customhouse	August 28, 1974 (#74002075)	701 San Jacinto St. 29°45′26″N 95°21′40″W	Houston	
48	Union Station	Union Station	November 10, 1977 (#77001448)	501 Crawford St. 29°45′25″N 95°21′23″W	Houston	
49	Willow Street Pump Station	Willow Street Pump Station	May 27, 2004 (#04000547)	University of Houston–Downtown; 811 N. San Jacinto St. 29°46′03″N 95°21′26″W	Houston	

== Former listings ==
	Name on the Register	Image	Date listed	Date removed	Location	City or town	Description
1	Macatee Building	Macatee Building	May 24, 1984 (#84001806)	April 15, 1991	101 Austin St. 29°45′40″N 95°21′22″W	Houston	
2	Pillot Building	Pillot Building	June 13, 1974 (#74002073)	October 28, 1994	1006 Congress Ave. 29°45′42″N 95°21′37″W	Houston	Collapsed in 1988, reconstructed with original building materials.

== See also ==
- List of National Historic Landmarks in Texas
- National Register of Historic Places listings in Texas
- Recorded Texas Historic Landmarks in Harris County
