= Cohn House =

Cohn House and variations may refer to:

- Habicht-Cohn-Crow House, Arkadelphia, Arkansas, listed on the National Register of Historic Places (NRHP) in Clark County
- Cohn House (Folsom, California), listed on the NRHP Sacramento County
- Emile Cohn House, Brookhaven, Mississippi, listed on the NRHP in Lincoln County
- Cohn–Sichel House, Portland, Oregon, listed on the NRHP in Multnomah County
- Arthur B. Cohn House, Houston, Texas, listed on the NRHP in Harris County
- Joe Cohn House, Waxahachie, Texas, listed on the NRHP in Ellis County
- Henry A. and Tile S. Cohn House, Salt Lake City, Utah, listed on the NRHP in Salt Lake County
