= Pillot =

Pillot may refer to:

== People ==
- Cooper Pillot, American actor
- Jean-Jacques Pillot (1808–1877), French revolutionary
- Luc Pillot (born 1959), French Olympic sailor
- Luis Pillot (1917–1963), Puerto Rican baseball player
- Rémi Pillot (born 1990), French footballer

== Other ==
- Henke & Pillot, American supermarket chain
- Hubbard Bell Grossman Pillot Memorial, public artwork Washington, D.C., U.S.A.
- Pillot Building, building in Houston, Texas, U.S.A.
