= Robert Alonzo Welch =

Robert Alonzo Welch (1872–1952) was a Texan investor who became very successful in the oil, sulfur, banking, and real estate industries in the Houston area. Originally from South Carolina, he moved to Houston at the age of fourteen. He worked for the Bute Paint Company as bookkeeper starting in 1891 and rose through the ranks to be secretary-treasurer. He resigned from this post in 1927, but remained on the company's board of directors.

In the early 1900s, Welch started investing in oil fields that was the start of his fortune. When he died, he left $25 million to a trust fund to support basic chemical research in Texas. This trust fund was later renamed the Robert A. Welch Foundation, and it is a major source of chemistry research funding in the state. According to his will, 15% of his estate ($7.5 million) was divided among his 29 employees.
