= Groover-Stewart Drug Company Building =

- U.S. National Register of Historic Places
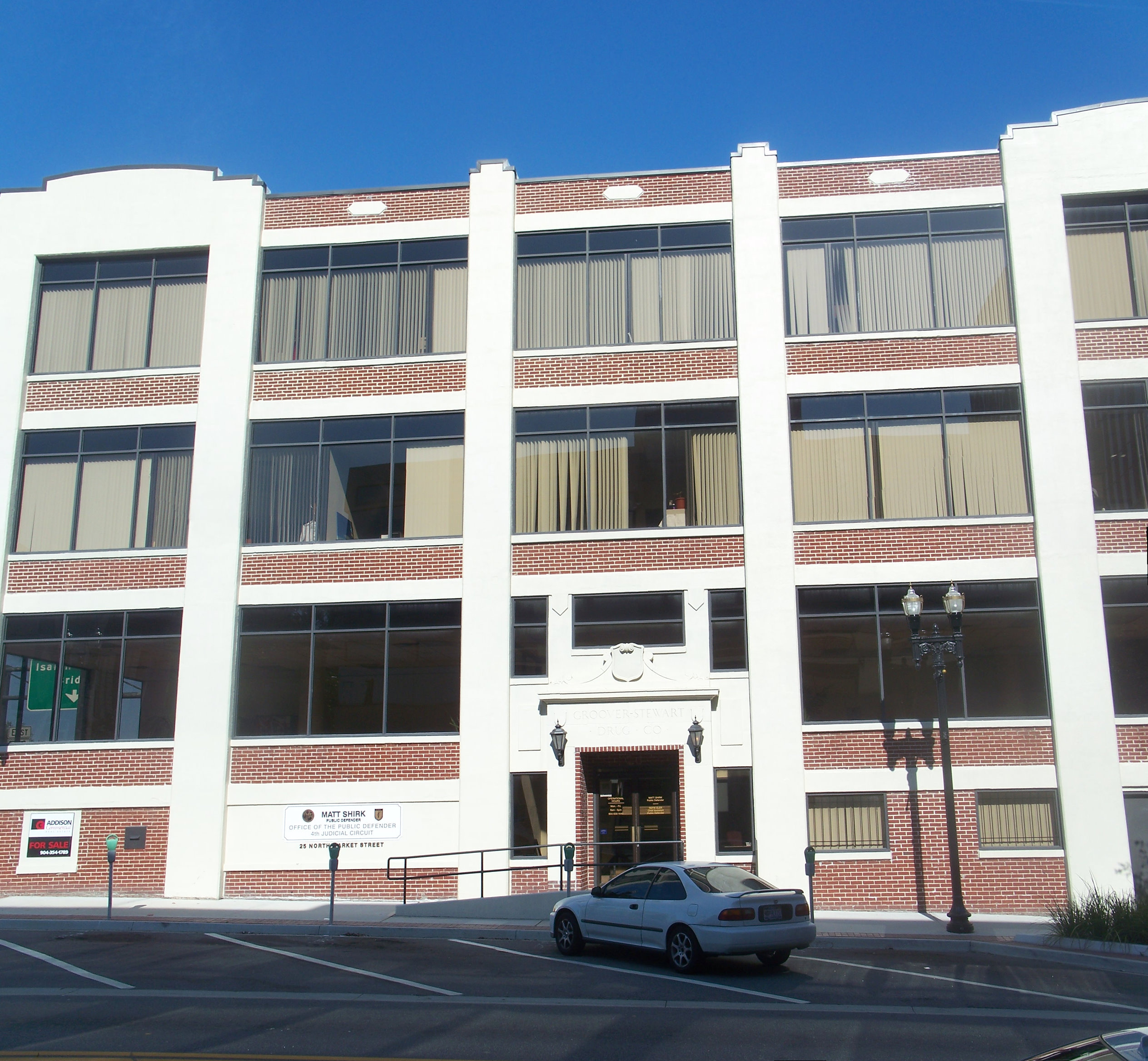

- Location within Florida Location within the United States
- Location: Jacksonville, Florida, USA
- Coordinates: 30°19′33″N 81°38′8″W
- Area: less than one acre
- Built: 1925
- Architect: Marsh & Saxelbye; Gerbrich, W.D.
- Architectural style: Vernacular Industrial
- MPS: Downtown Jacksonville MPS
- NRHP reference No.: 92001696
- Added to NRHP: December 30, 1992

The Groover-Stewart Drug Company Building (also known as the McKesson-Robbins Drug Company Building) is a historic site in Jacksonville, Florida. It is located at 25 North Market Street. On December 30, 1992, it was added to the U.S. National Register of Historic Places.

== Current Use ==
In January 2016, the Groover-Stewart Drug Company Building was purchased by workspace provider Novel Coworking, which renovated the building's interior to offer private offices and co-working space for small businesses.
