= Gary L. Herod =

US Air Force officer (1929–1961)

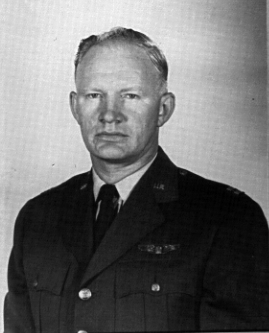
Capt. Gary L. Herod

Captain Gary L. Herod (December 10, 1929 – March 15, 1961) was a Texas Air National Guard pilot who was killed when his T-33 jet trainer crashed on the afternoon of March 15, 1961.

Shortly after takeoff from Ellington Field, southeast of Houston, Texas, Herod experienced engine failure. Although it is likely that he could have ejected safely, he remained with the plane to ensure that it did not crash into homes in the Houston suburbs. Herod initially turned his plane around in an effort to return to Ellington Field or another airport. He radioed air traffic control that he was going to bail out. When controllers asked for confirmation, he replied, “Not yet”. These were his last words. Herod stayed with his plane until it crashed into what was then a vacant field surrounded by homes. The crash site was opposite the end of Atwell Drive on the north bank of Braes Bayou.

Capt. Herod was a member of the 182nd Fighter Squadron of the 149th Fighter Wing of the Texas Air National Guard, based at Kelly Air Force Base in San Antonio, Texas.

== Honors and Memorials ==
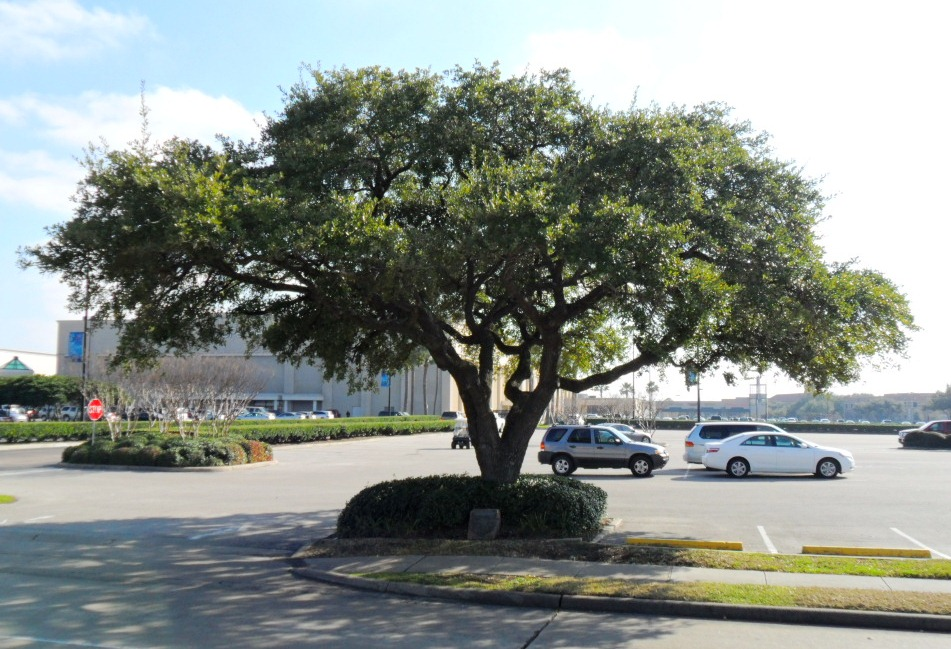
Original Hero Tree Near Meyerland Plaza in 2011

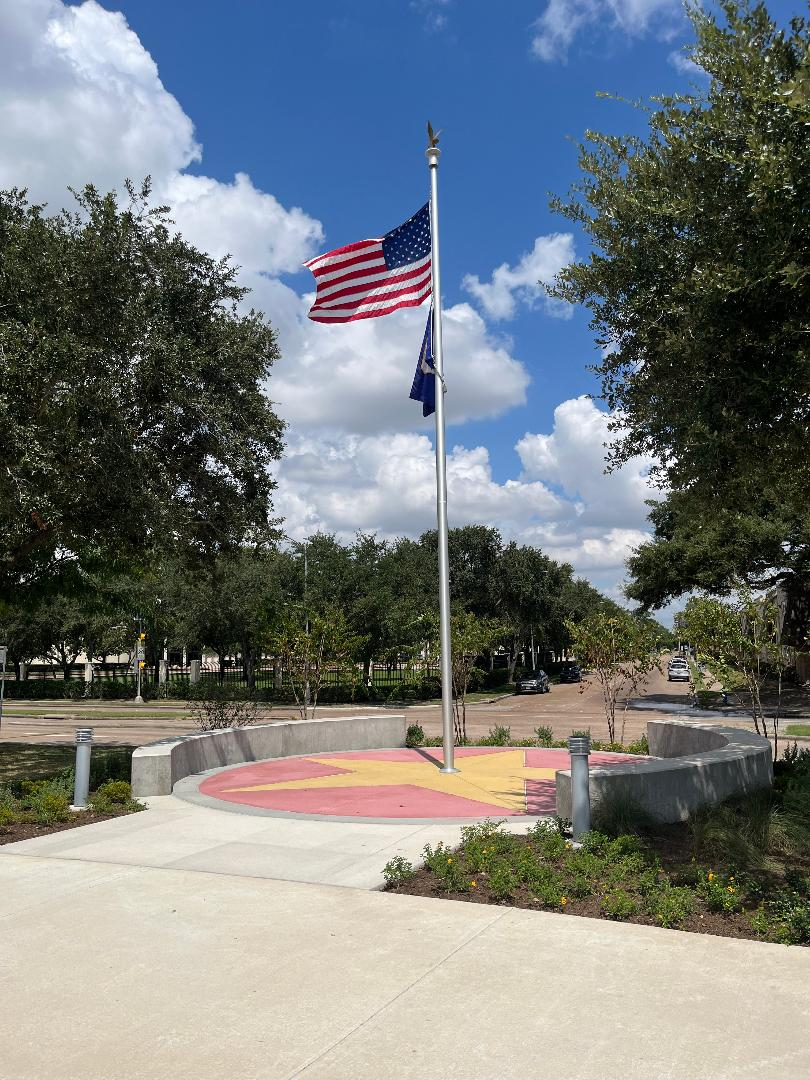
Captain Gary Herod Memorial Plaza, Brays Bayou Greenway, Houston, Texas

- The Air Force awarded Herod a posthumous Distinguished Flying Cross.
- The original "Hero Tree" was dedicated in Herod's honor on Memorial Day 1961. The tree, stone marker, and plaque were located near the Meyerland Plaza shopping center a few miles east of the crash site. The tree was cut down on July 17, 2018. The stone marker and plaque were relocated to the grounds of Herod Elementary School.
- The Gary L. Herod Elementary School is located near the crash site and is named in Herod's honor. His photo and memorial flag are on display in the school library. Outside the school entrance is a plaque that tells the story of his heroism.
- A new memorial plaza was constructed in the summer of 2025. The new plaza is located near the intersection of N. Braeswood Blvd and Mullins St. The plaza is located along the Brays Bayou Greenway trail.
