= Houston Bar Center Building =

Historic building in Houston, Texas, U.S.

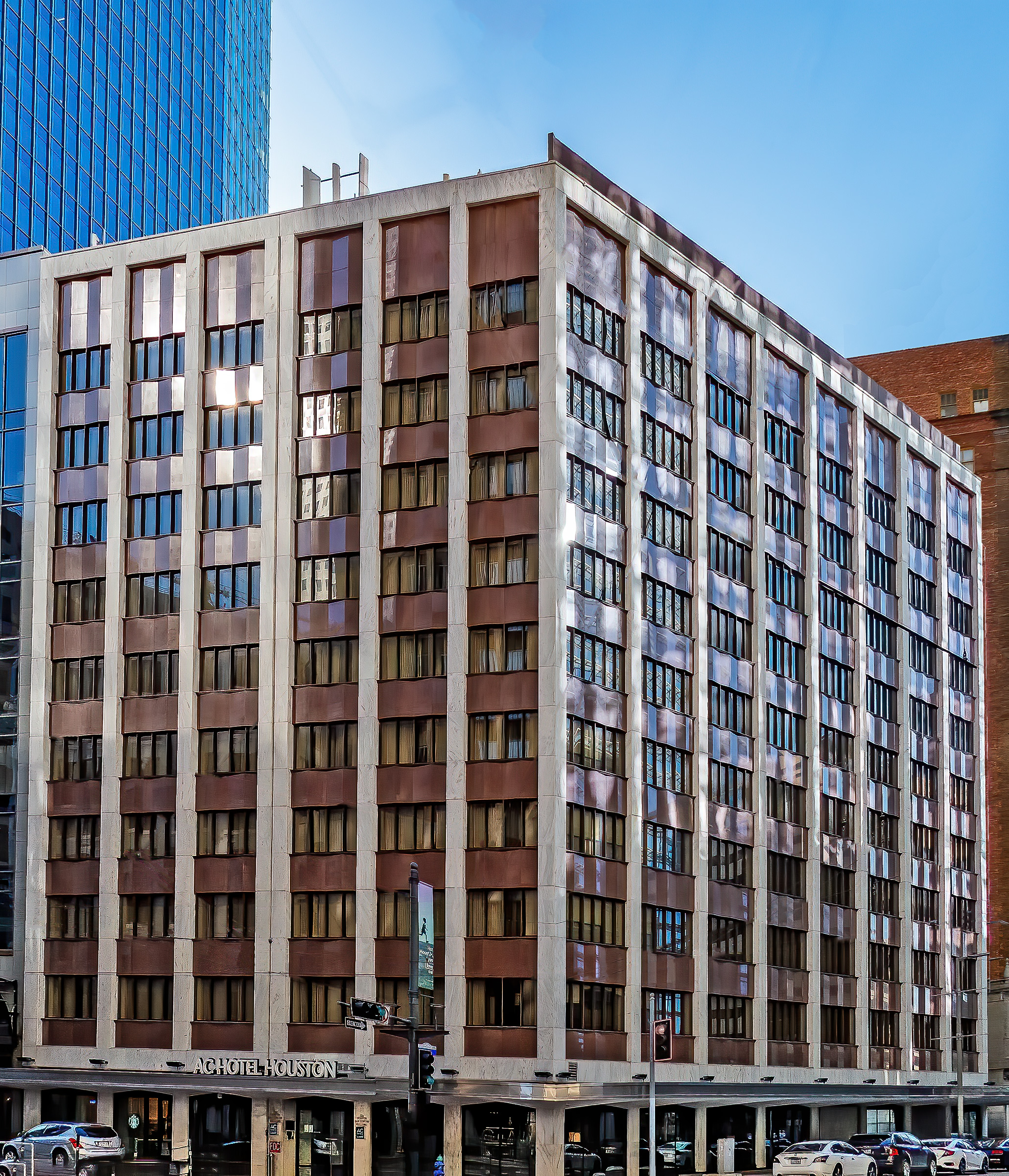
- Interactive map of the Houston Bar Center Building area

General information
- Location: Houston, Texas, United States
- Coordinates: 29°45′30.5″N 95°21′48″W
- Houston Bar Center Building
- U.S. National Register of Historic Places
- NRHP reference No.: 100001254
- Added to NRHP: June 26, 2017

The Houston Bar Center Building is an office building at 723 Main Street in downtown Houston, Texas. The building began as two separate skyscrapers, the Rusk Building and the Gulf Building, which were built in 1913 and 1915 respectively by Houston businessman Jesse H. Jones. In 1966, architect Eugene William Slater completely remodeled both buildings into a single tower. The redesigned ten-story building has a New Formalist design, a variation of Modernism which abstracted elements of classical architecture. It incorporates traditional building materials such as granite and marble and uses a first-floor canopy and belt course along with marble pilasters and a plain marble cornice to suggest a classical column. The building is both one of Houston's most prominent New Formalist works and an example of the mid-twentieth century trend of redesigning and reengineering older buildings.

The building was added to the National Register of Historic Places on June 26, 2017.

In 2019 the AC Hotels opened their first Houston location in the building.

== See also ==
- National Register of Historic Places listings in downtown Houston, Texas
