= Stowers Building =

Historic building in Houston, Texas, U.S.

- U.S. National Register of Historic Places
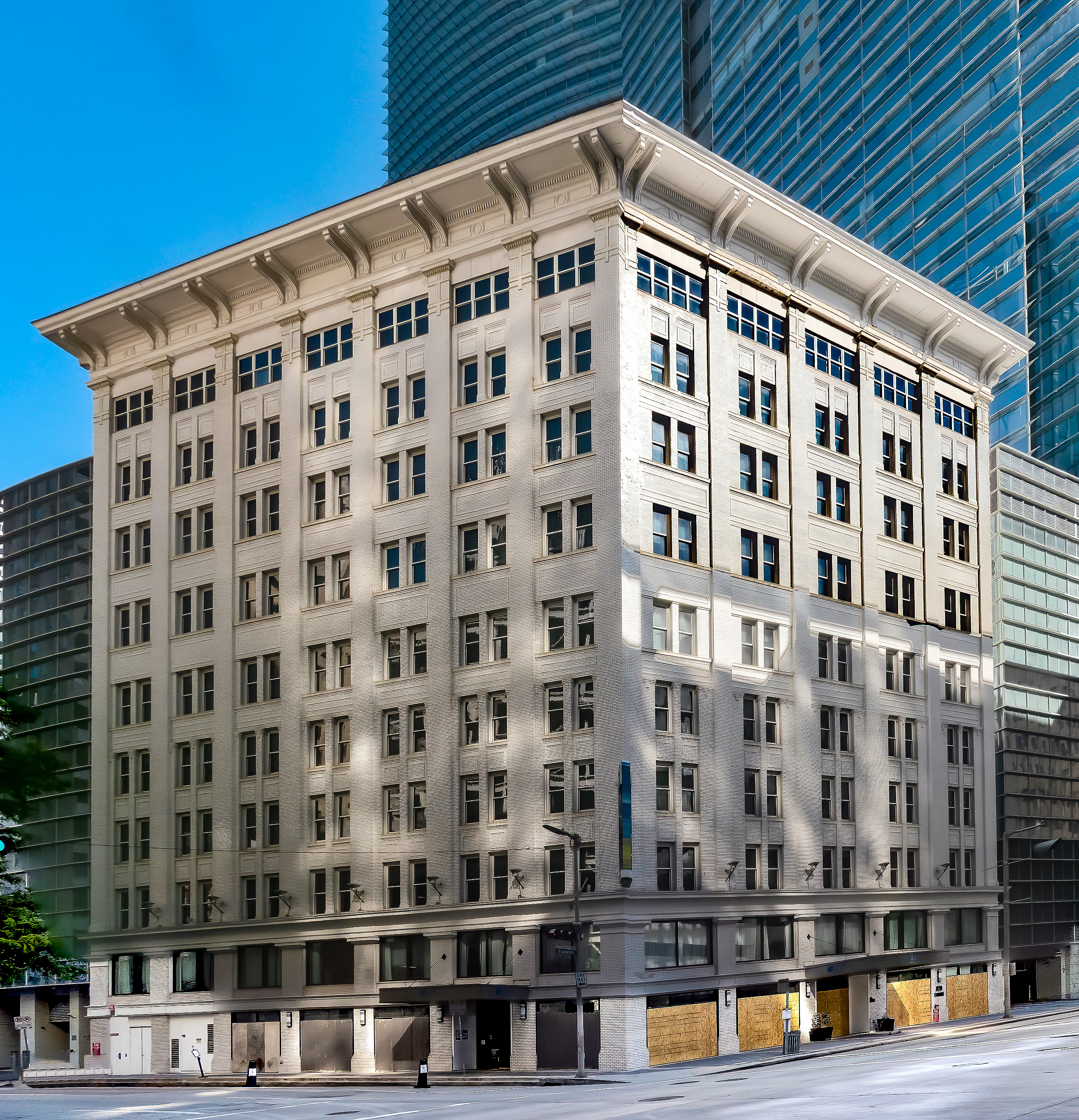
- Stowers Building 2018, now the Aloft Hotel

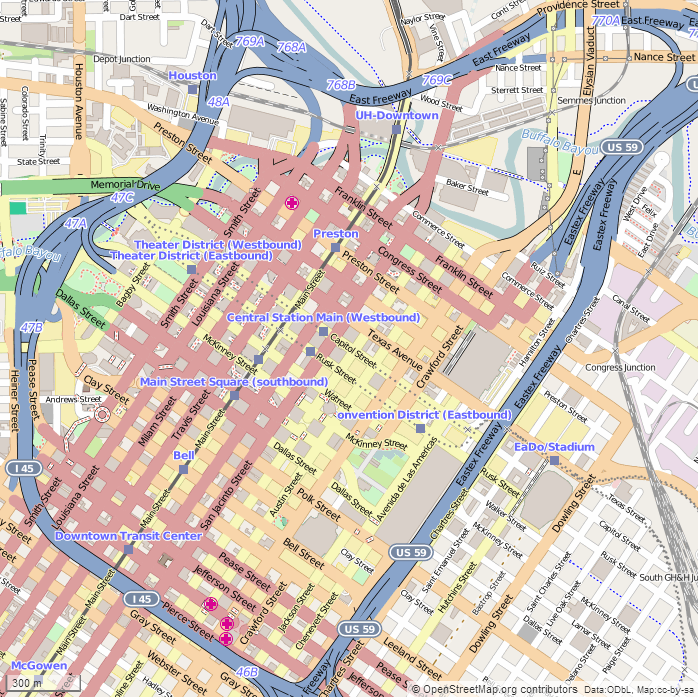
- Location within Houston Downtown Location within Texas Location within the United States
- Location: Fannin and Walker streets, Houston, Texas
- Coordinates: 29°45′27″N 95°21′49″W
- Built: 1913
- Built by: Pearson & Co.
- Architect: Green and Finger
- Architectural style: Chicago style
- NRHP reference No.: 15000335
- Added to NRHP: 2014

The Stowers Building is located at 820 Fannin Street in downtown Houston. The building was constructed in 1913 and is listed on the National Register of Historic Places (NRHP). The building is named for George Arthur Stowers and his furniture company, which had moved into the new "skyscraper" after a fire at his Main Street store. The local firm of Green & Finger designed the ten-story building which was constructed out of reinforced steel by Pearson & Co. The building was representative of a period of skyscraper construction in Houston between 1908 and 1913. It is listed on the National Register of Historic Places.

== History ==
The Stowers Building is a building named for G. A. Stowers Furniture Company and George Arthur Stowers, who developed the property for its retail store in 1913 at the corner of Fannin and Walker streets in downtown Houston. The architecture firm of Green & Finger composed its structure from reinforced concrete, clad the building in white brick, and capped it with a pressed metal cornice. Drawing some of its inspiration from the Chicago style, the facades are rectangular, with pilasters defining vertical bay structures, with seven of these vertical modules facing south and five modules facing east to the Fannin side. The partners of the architecture firm were Lewis Sterling Green and Joseph Finger. During their two years of working together, they designed three buildings in Houston, most notably the De George Hotel.

George Arthur Stowers (1867–1917) was born in Richmond County, Georgia on February 3, 1867. His family moved to Atlanta, where he attended school and worked. He worked there as a Western Union messenger, sold newspapers for the Atlanta Constitution, and worked for a confectioner. He entered the furniture retail business in Birmingham, Alabama at the age of seventeen with his own capital. He added locations in Alabama, while expanding to Tennessee and Texas. Later he established a permanent headquarters in San Antonio, Texas and started his first store in Houston, on Main Street, at the beginning of the 20th century. Their store on the 700 block of Main was consumed by fire, which led them to commission the Stowers Building.

Gordon's Jewelers acquired Stowers Furniture Company in 1966. The new owners moved the furniture store to far west Houston and moved their jewelry operations into the Stowers Building.

The Stowers building represents a period of early skyscraper development in Houston from 1909 to 1913. It was one of eight buildings of at least nine stories built during this period in downtown Houston, five of which are extant NRHP properties: the Scanlan Building (1909), the Carter Building (1910), the Southern Pacific Office Building (1911), Union National Bank (1912), and the Rice Hotel (1913).

== Hotel ==
As of 2016, the Stowers Building was under the ownership and management of Trend Hospitality, a hotel operator with an agreement to brand the facility with Starwood Hotels & Resorts Worldwide, a division of Marriott International. It named the Hotel Aloft, one of two in Houston. The redevelopment of building as a hotel coincided with a large expansion of lodging capacity and the redevelopment of other historic properties in preparation for the 2017 Super Bowl. The hotel opened in October 2016 with 168 large rooms.

== Gallery ==
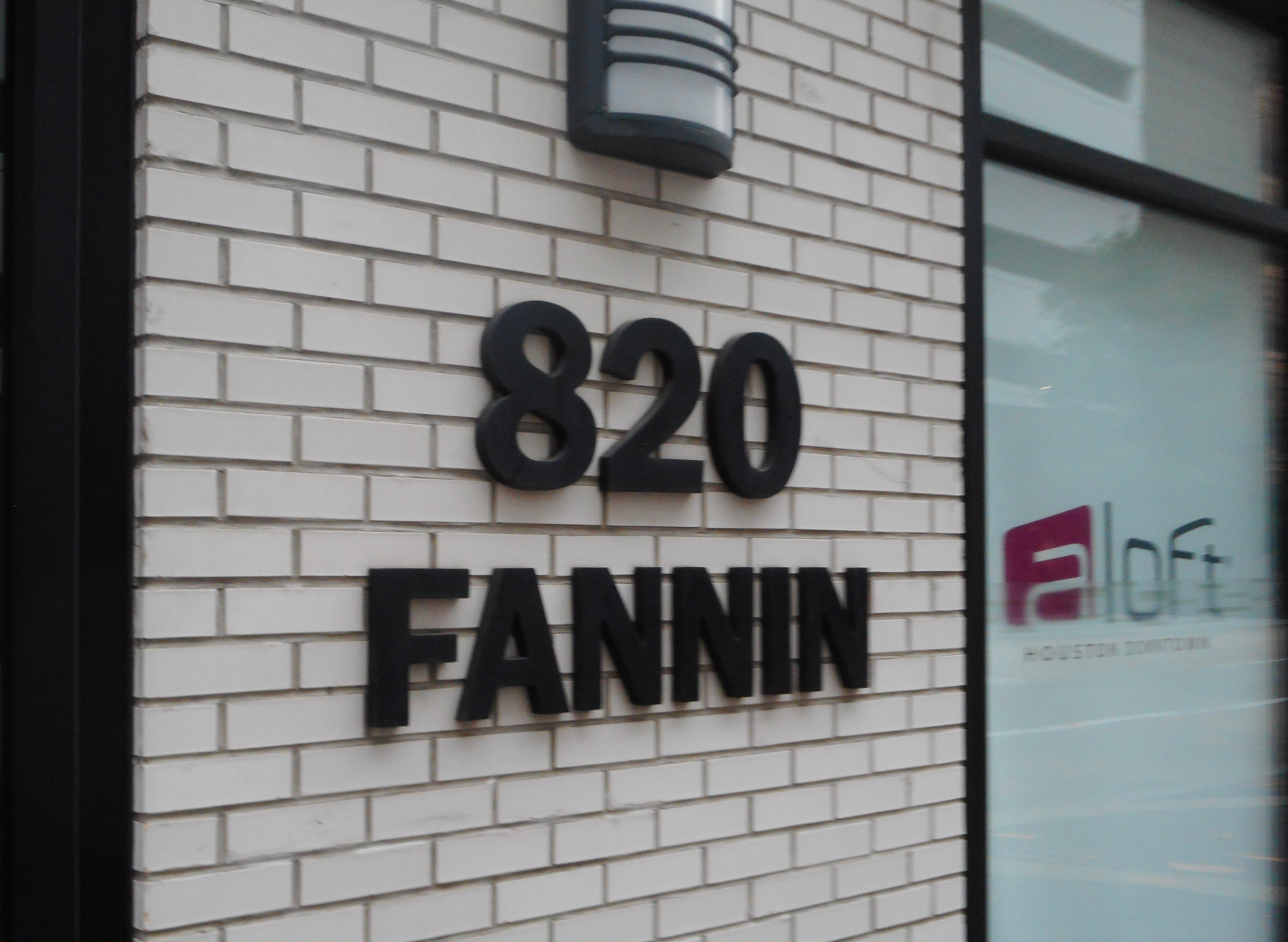
Aloft Hotel, 820 Fannin, downtown Houston

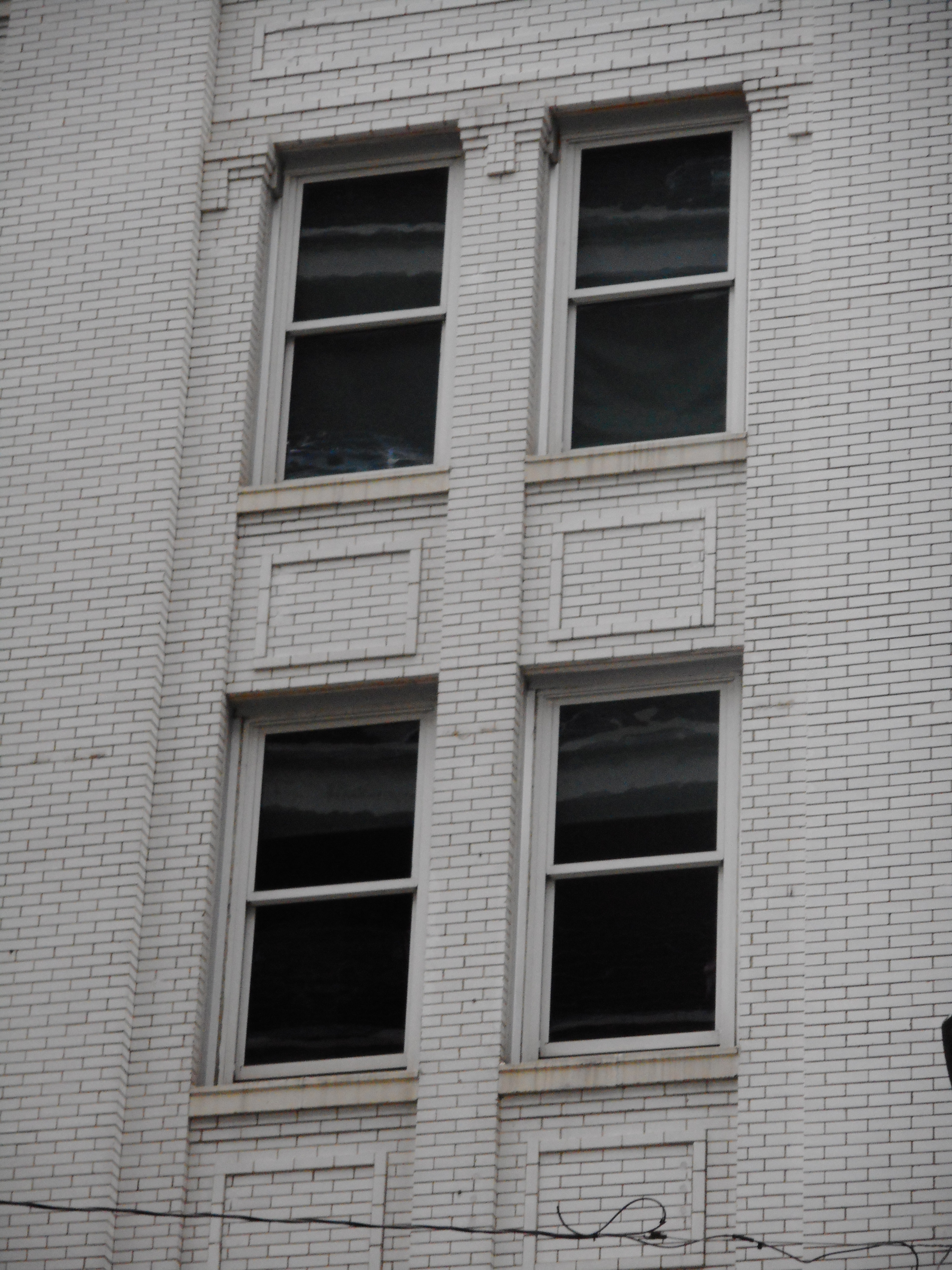
Close up of window bay from the Walker Street elevation
