= Melrose Building =

Building in Houston, Texas, U.S.

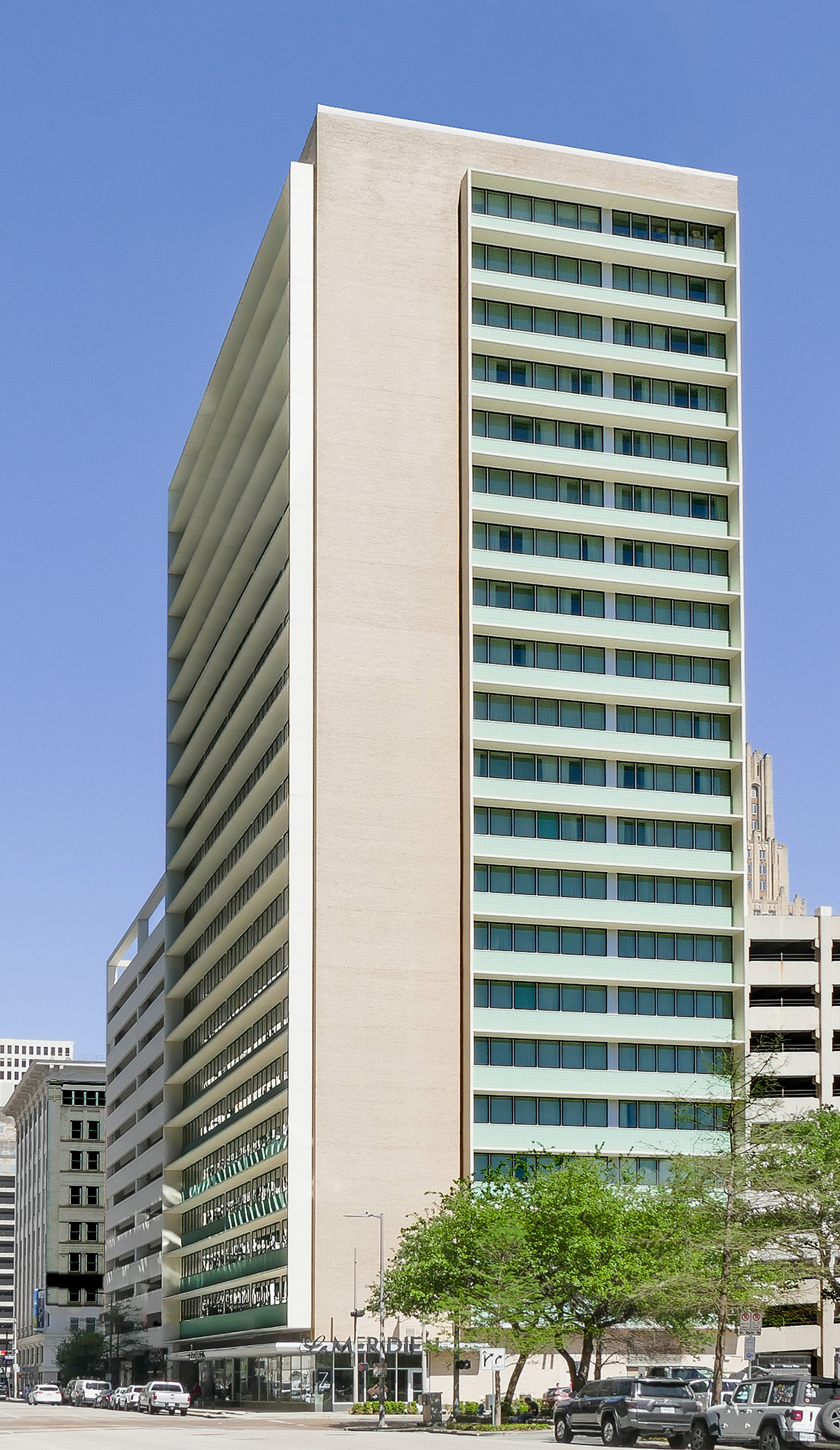
- The building's exterior in 2021
- Interactive map of the Melrose Building area
- Alternative names: Le Méridien Houston Downtown

General information
- Type: Hotel
- Architectural style: Modern
- Location: Downtown Houston, 1121 Walker Street, Houston, Texas, United States
- Coordinates: 29°45′25″N 95°21′46″W
- Renovated: 2017

The Melrose Building is a building in downtown Houston, Texas, United States. Completed in 1952 as Houston's first International Style skyscraper, the building is listed on the National Register of Historic Places.

Following a major renovation and restoration, the building opened as Le Méridien Houston Downtown in September 2017.

== See also ==
- National Register of Historic Places listings in downtown Houston, Texas
