= Meyerland Plaza =

Shopping center in Houston, Texas

Coordinates: 29.687°N 95.462°W

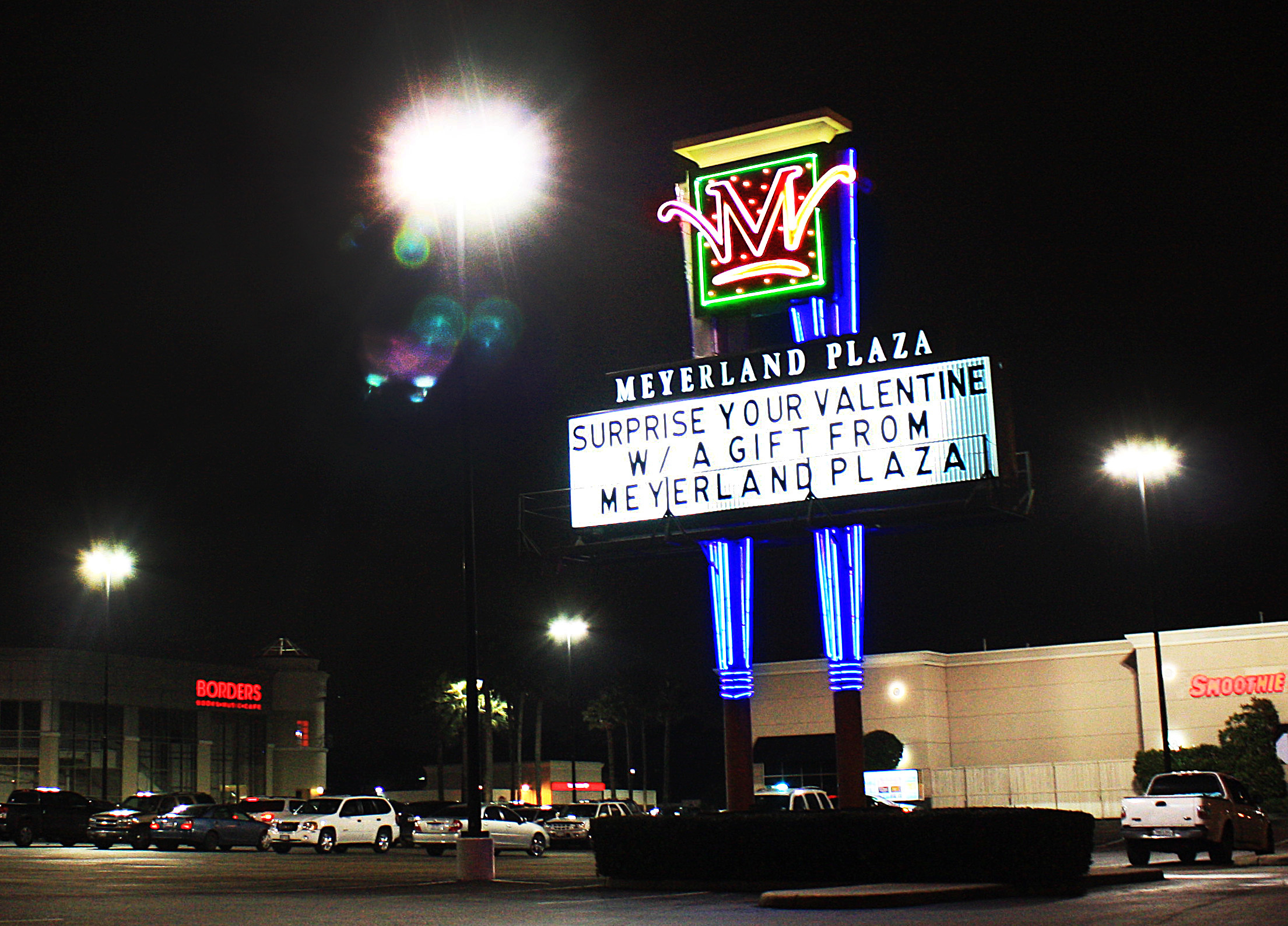
Meyerland Plaza sign at night

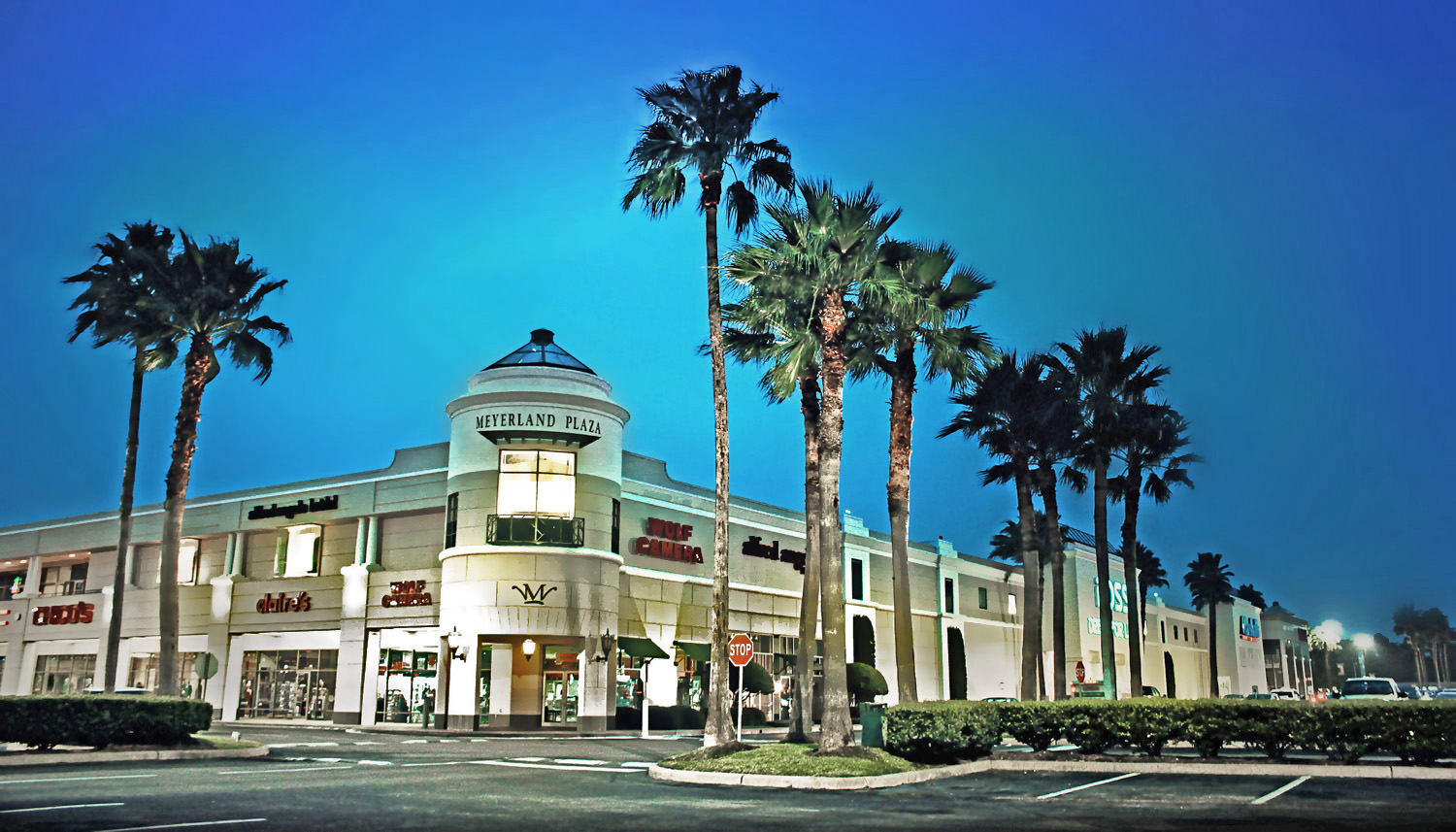
Meyerland Plaza

Meyerland Plaza is a large shopping center located in southwest Houston, Texas, United States. Meyerland Plaza is located in the Meyerland neighborhood of Houston and is just outside the 610 Loop. The anchor stores are JCPenney, Target, Ross Dress for Less, Marshalls, EOS Fitness, H-E-B, Old Navy, Joann, and Office Depot. There are 5 vacant anchor stores that were once Bed Bath & Beyond, Palais Royal, Stein Mart, Best Buy, and Pier 1 Imports.

== History ==
Meyerland Plaza opened on October 31, 1957. Around the time the Houston Chronicle stated that Meyerland Plaza was "in the heart of the luxury residential additions of Southwest Houston." A Houston Chronicle article from October 27, 1957 stated that Meyerland Plaza was developed to maintain the suburban atmosphere that was present in surrounding areas. Meyerland Plaza was originally built as Houston's second "regional mall". The mall originally housed a Henke & Pillot supermarket.

The shopping center started to decay in the 1980s. Meyerland Co., which was a former owner of the center, filed for bankruptcy in 1987. Lamar Savings Association and Continental Savings Association foreclosed on the center later that year. The center has been re-developed as a power center; its official grand re-opening was in 1995. Fidelis and BlackRock purchased the shopping center in September 2013.

On Memorial Day, May 30, 1961, the "Hero Tree" was dedicated as a living memorial to Capt. Gary L. Herod for his heroism. The tree and a stone marker were located along Beechnut Street near Compass Bank. In February 2018, as the section of Meyerland Plaza was to be redeveloped, Embark Tree and Landscape Services arborist Steve Navarro determined the tree was in poor health. The tree was cut down in July 2018 and given to the Woodworkers Club of Houston be turned into souvenirs, while the plaque was moved to Herod Elementary School.

== Shops ==
H-E-B opened a supermarket in Meyerland Plaza in 2019; its previous Meyerland store, located elsewhere, closed in 2017 after Hurricane Harvey.

Becks Prime leased 2,701 square feet (250.9 m^{2}) of space in Meyerland Plaza in 2008.

The Meyerland Plaza Bed Bath and Beyond closed in 2020.
