= Palace Hotel (Houston) =

Historic building in Houston, Texas, U.S.

- U.S. National Register of Historic Places
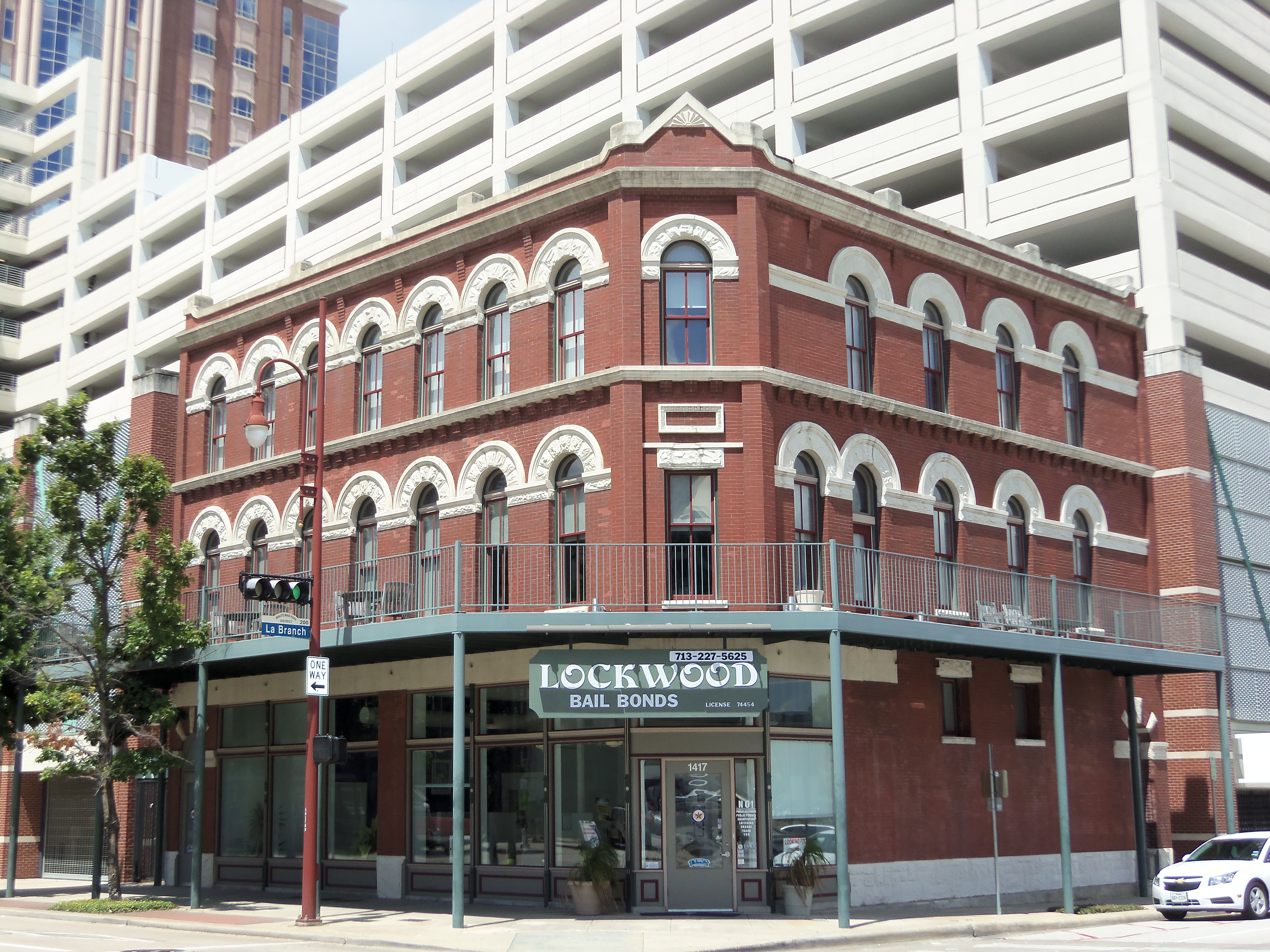
- The building's exterior in 2012

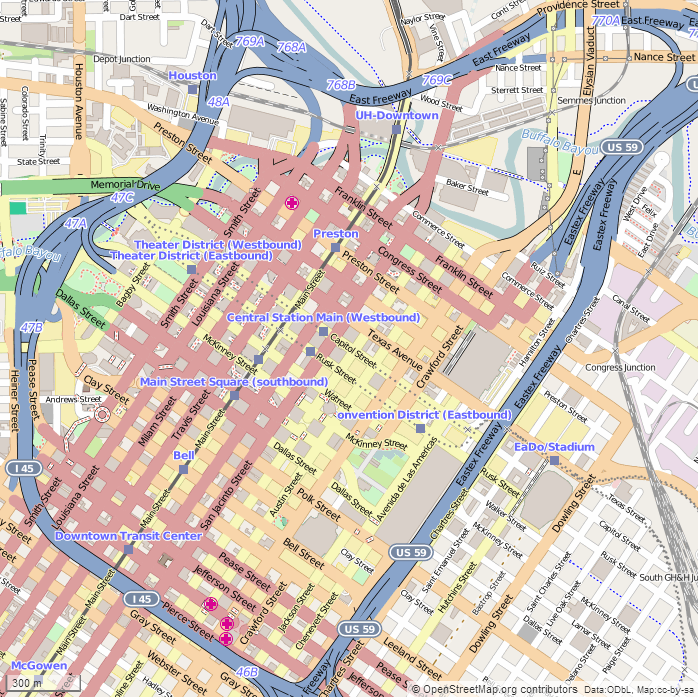
- Location within Houston Downtown Location within Texas Location within the United States
- Location: 216 La Branch, Houston, Texas
- Coordinates: 29°45′44″N 95°21′24″W
- Area: less than one acre
- Built: 1903
- Architect: Olle Lorehn
- Architectural style: Romanesque
- NRHP reference No.: 06000825
- Added to NRHP: September 13, 2006

The Palace Hotel, located at 216 La Branch in Houston, Texas, was listed on the National Register of Historic Places on September 13, 2006.

== History ==
The Palace Hotel was constructed in 1903 at 216 LaBranch Street, at the corner of Congress Avenue in Downtown Houston. It is located on a block that was part of the original survey of Houston in 1836. This property was previously owned at different times by two Houston mayors, William Robinson Baker and William J. Hutchins. In 1902, a grocer, William A. Burkett and Kate Burkett acquired the two lots at the northwest corner of LaBranch Street and Congress Avenue, while commissioning the development of a hotel with John Stadtler.

== See also ==
- National Register of Historic Places listings in Harris County, Texas
