= Paul Building =

Historic building in Houston, Texas, U.S.

- U.S. National Register of Historic Places
- U.S. Historic district – Contributing property
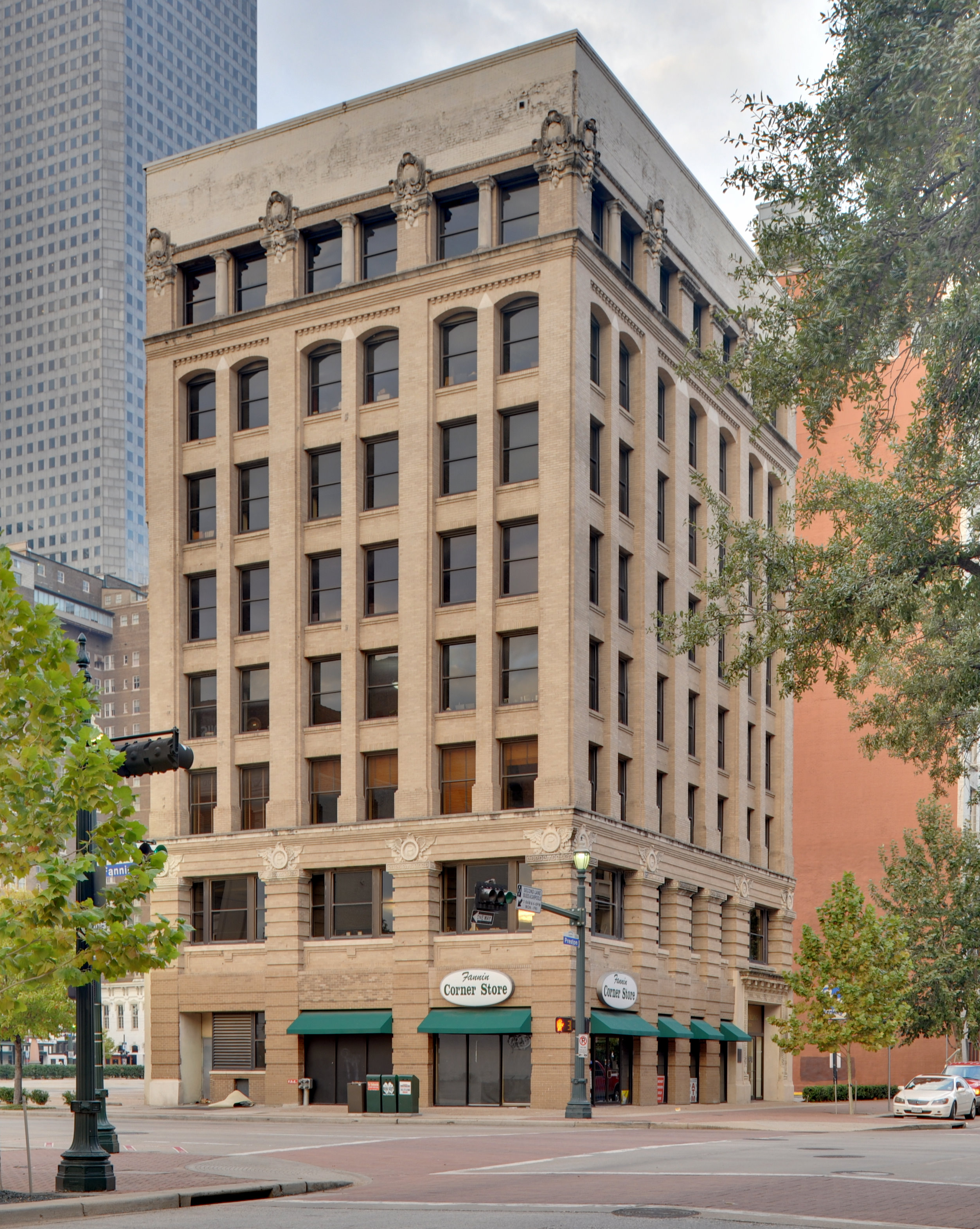
- The building's exterior in 2010

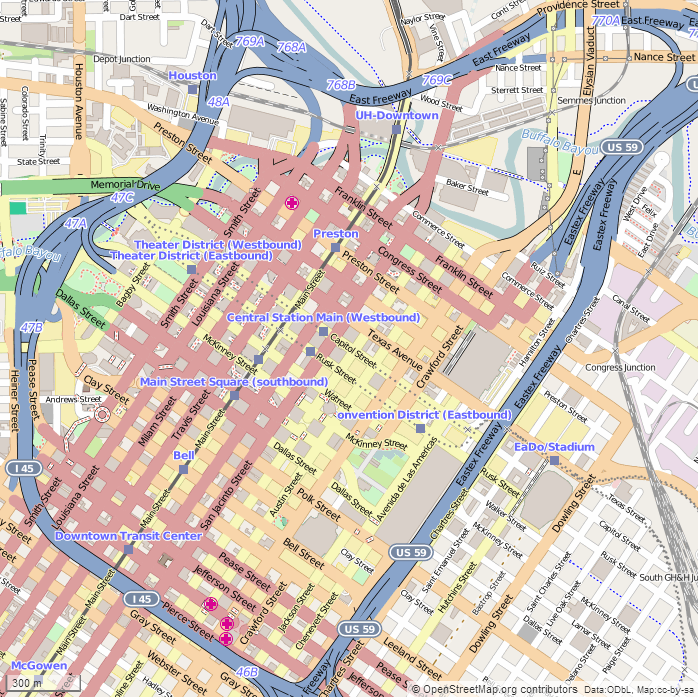
- Location within Houston Downtown Location within Texas Location within the United States
- Location: 1018 Preston Ave., Houston, Texas
- Coordinates: 29°45′39.4″N 95°21′38.8″W
- Area: less than one acre
- Built: 1907
- Built by: Buchanan and Gilder Construction Co.
- Architect: Sanguinet & Staats
- Architectural style: Chicago, Late 19th And Early 20th Century American Movements, Sullivanesque
- Part of: Main Street/Market Square Historic District (ID83004471)
- NRHP reference No.: 79002967

Significant dates
- Added to NRHP: April 6, 1979
- Designated CP: July 18, 1983

The Paul Building is a high-rise office building located at 1018 Preston Avenue in Houston, Texas. It was listed on the National Register of Historic Places on April 6, 1979. Completed in 1907, the building has been home to a wide range of businesses and professionals. It housed the United States District Court in 1910, and with its proximity to the county courthouse, it became a popular location for attorneys. Its tenants have also included a newspaper, and the Y.M.C.A. The building changed its name to the Hoffman Building in 1918 and then to the Turnbow Building in 1927. It has been known as the Republic Building since 1923.

The building is eight stories tall, built of brown brink with load bearing walls. Terra cotta ornamentation includes several cartouches with a raised "P" representing the original owner, Allen Paul.

== See also ==
- National Register of Historic Places listings in Harris County, Texas
