= Texas Company Building =

Historic building in Houston, Texas, U.S.

- The Star Houston
- U.S. National Register of Historic Places
- Texas Company Building
- The Texaco Building
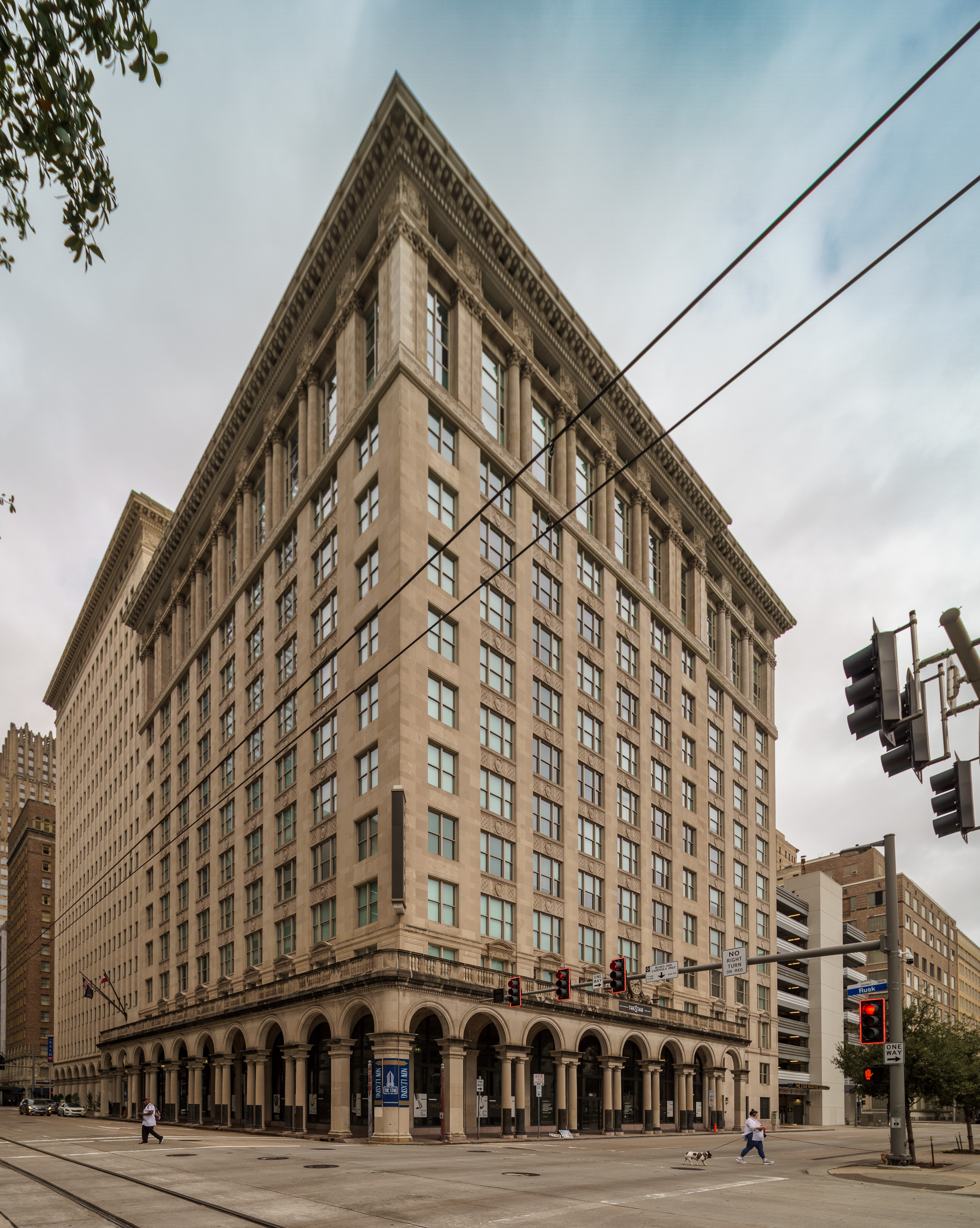
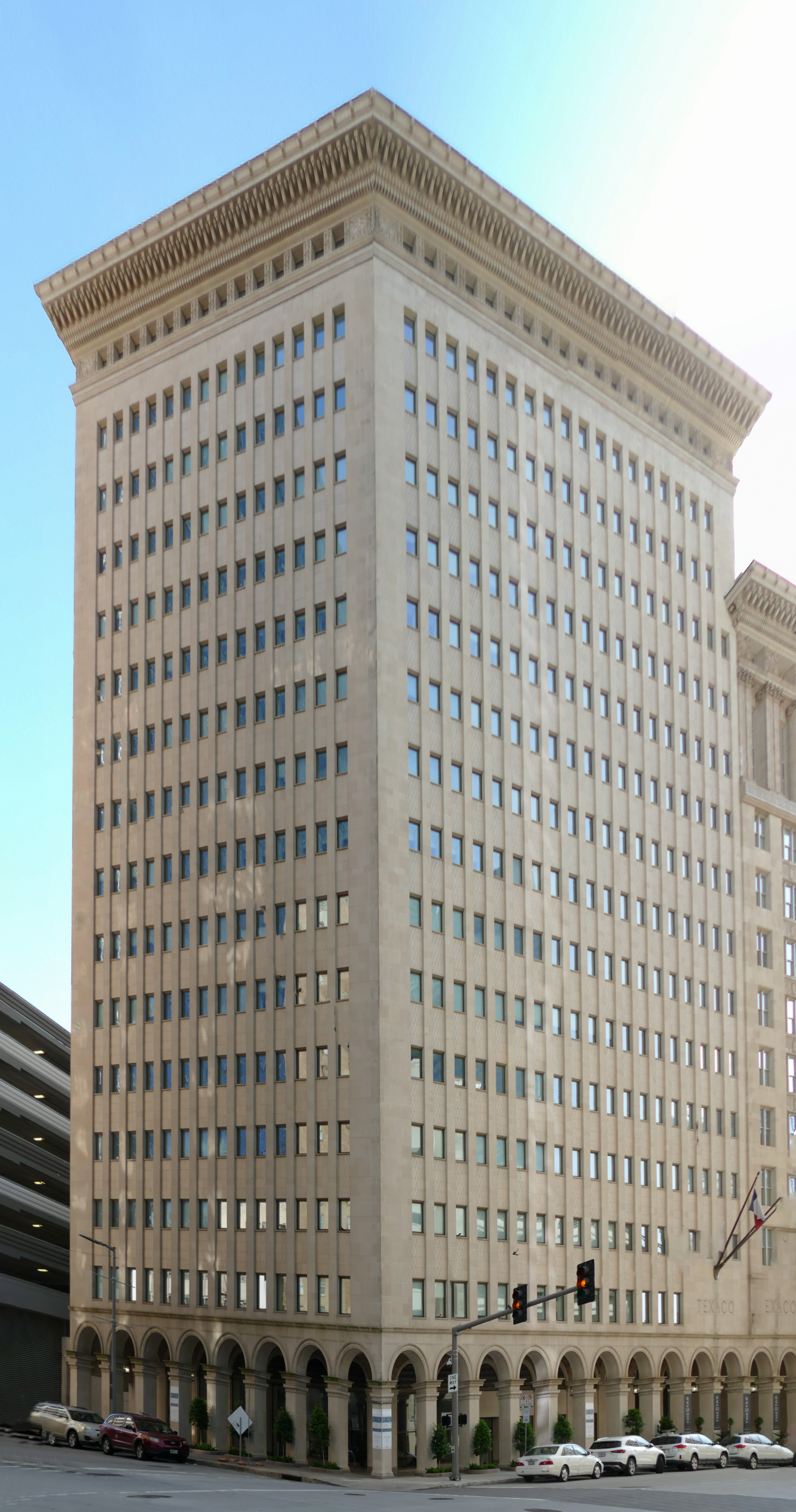
- 1915 building 1959 expansion

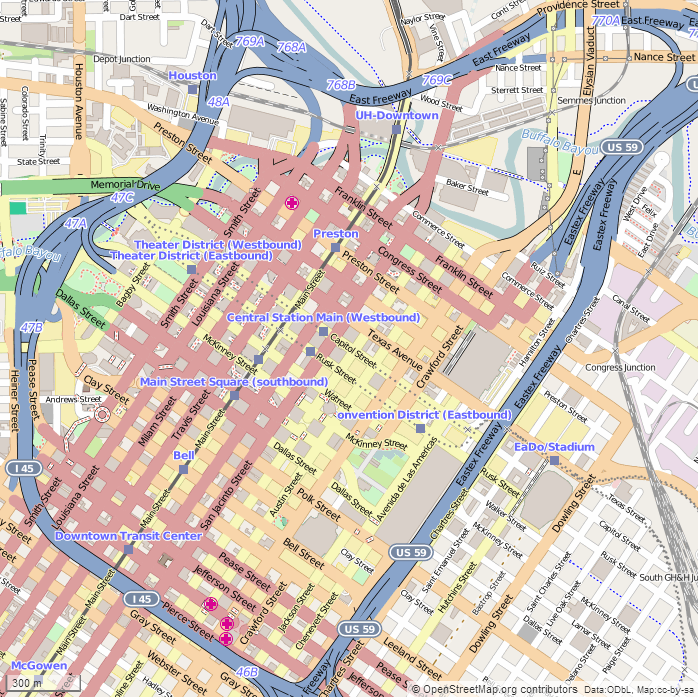
- Location within Houston Downtown Location within Texas Location within the United States
- Location: 1111 Rusk Street, 780 San Jacinto Street, Houston, Texas
- Coordinates: 29°45′40″N 95°21′42″W
- Area: less than one acre
- Built: 1915
- Architect: Warren and Wetmore; Franzheim, Kenneth, et al.
- Architectural style: Renaissance Revival, Beaux-Arts
- Restored: 2017
- Restored by: HBG Design
- Website: The Star Houston
- NRHP reference No.: 03000185
- Added to NRHP: April 2, 2003

The Star Houston apartments, formerly the Texas Company Building, located at 1111 Rusk Street and 720 Jacinto Street in Houston, Texas, was listed on the National Register of Historic Places on April 2, 2003.

== History ==
The original thirteen story, three-bay building opened in 1915 on the corner of Rusk and San Jacinto Street, as headquarters of the Texas Company. The New York firm of Warren and Wetmore designed the building in the Renaissance Revival style with Beaux-Arts accents. The exterior is faced with brick, terra cotta and Bedford limestone and features vaulted arcades supported by Tuscan columns along its Rusk and San Jacinto Street façades. A distinguishing feature of the building is its vaulted arcade with a balcony. The arcade was designed by the Guastavino tile Company.

=== Expansion ===
To accommodate growth, the company expanded the structure three times between 1936 and 1975.

In 1936, Warren and Wetmore designed a three bay addition to the east (San Jacinto Street) façade, designed in a slightly less elaborate style.

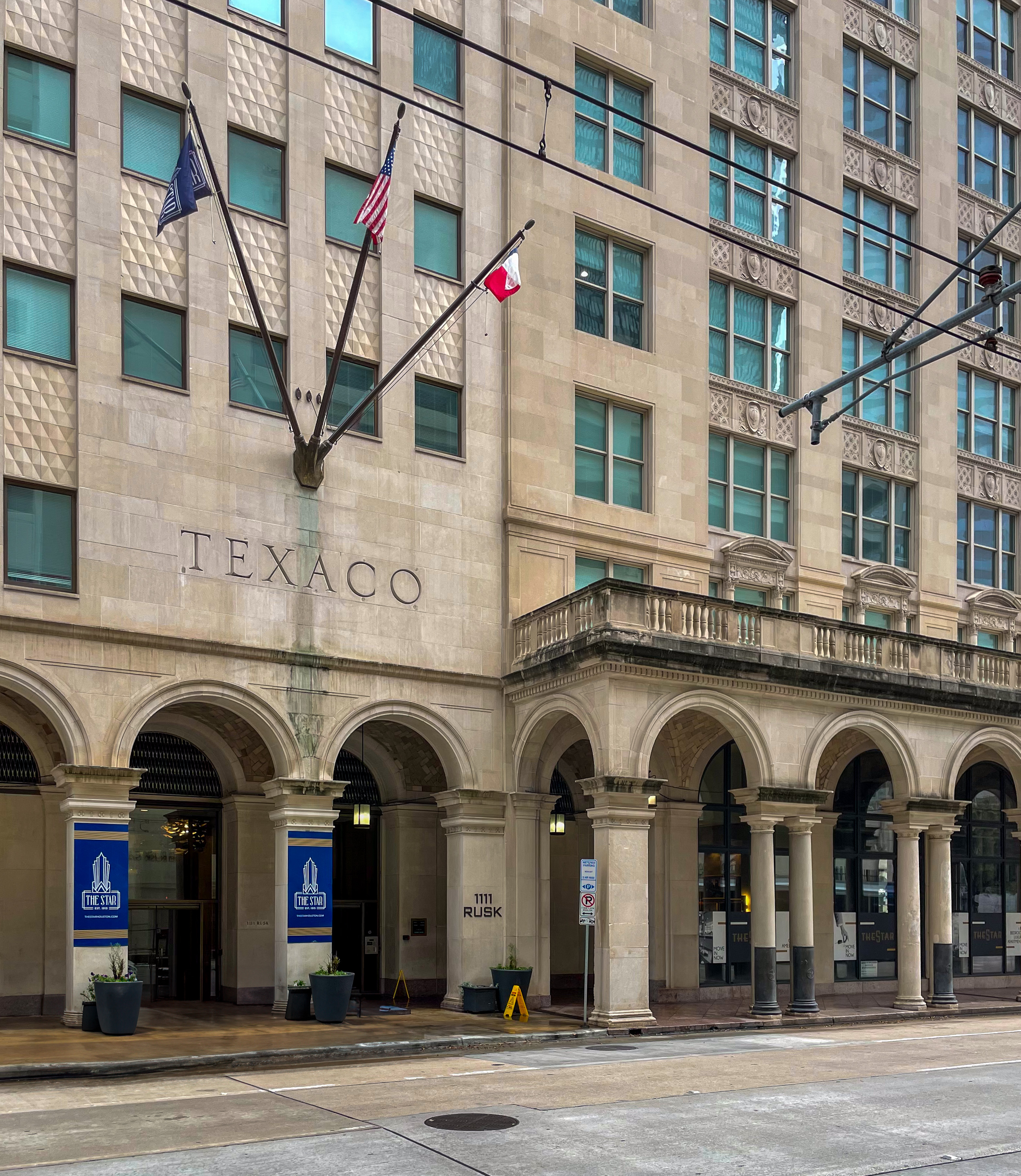
1959 addition at left; 1915 building at right

In 1959 an additional a ten-by-eight bay, sixteen story addition designed by Kenneth Franzheim was added to the west elevation of the original building. This extends along Rusk Street to the other side of the block at Fannin Street. This huge addition is similar to the original building but in an Art Moderne style, and also includes a Guastavino designed arcade.

The Texas Company became Texaco in 1959 and continued to occupy the building until 1989 when it moved to another facility.

=== Years of vacancy ===
The building became vacant in 1989.

Since the building became vacant, developers proposed several plans to reuse it, however none were successful. In 2011, a development consortium created a plan for approximately 300 apartments with retail space and parking. They began work in 2013 and have demolished part of the structure but kept the 13-story section, the 1936 annex and the 16-story expansion added in 1958. Eventual plans call for a 38-story tower behind the historic structure.

=== Restored as residences ===
The restored building was converted to apartments and re-opened in February 2017 as "The Star", a reference to Texaco's start-shaped logo. The luxury building holds 286 one- and two-bedroom apartments, ranging from 730 to 1,730 square feet, and 21,000 square feet of street-front retail space.

== See also ==
- National Register of Historic Places listings in Harris County, Texas
