= Henke & Pillot =

Henke & Pillot, Inc.
- Company type: Subsidiary of The Kroger Co.
- Industry: Retail
- Founded: 1872
- Defunct: 1966
- Fate: Rebranded as Kroger
- Products: Bakery, dairy, deli, frozen foods, general grocery, meat, pharmacy, produce, seafood, snacks, liquor
- Parent: Kroger
- Website: Kroger.com

Henke & Pillot was a chain of supermarkets headquartered in Houston, Texas. The chain began in 1872. During its final years of existence, it was a subsidiary of Kroger, which acquired Henke's in 1955. In 1966, Kroger announced the retirement of the Henke & Pillot name.

== History ==
In 1872, Henry Henke, a grocer from New Orleans, Louisiana, visited Houston to try to establish a new chain. In 1882, Henke asked Camille G. Pillot to become the company bookkeeper; a few years later, Pillot became a full partner in the firm. In 1925, the chain had two stores, one at 302 Milam in what is now Downtown Houston, and the other in what is now Midtown Houston. In May 1955, The Kroger Company acquired Henke & Pillot. Henke's logo soon was changed to look similar to the Kroger logo. In 1956, the chain operated 27 stores, with locations in Greater Houston (Houston, Galveston, Pasadena, and Velasco) and the Beaumont-Port Arthur area (Beaumont, Port Arthur, and Orange). In 1965 it had its corporate headquarters in Houston and 20 stores in the Greater Houston area (Houston, Seabrook, and South Houston); one of its Houston stores was in Meyerland Plaza. In 1966, Kroger announced that it was expanding its presence in Greater Houston and that it would retire the Henke & Pillot name. The chain was six years short of its 100th anniversary.

== Pillot House ==
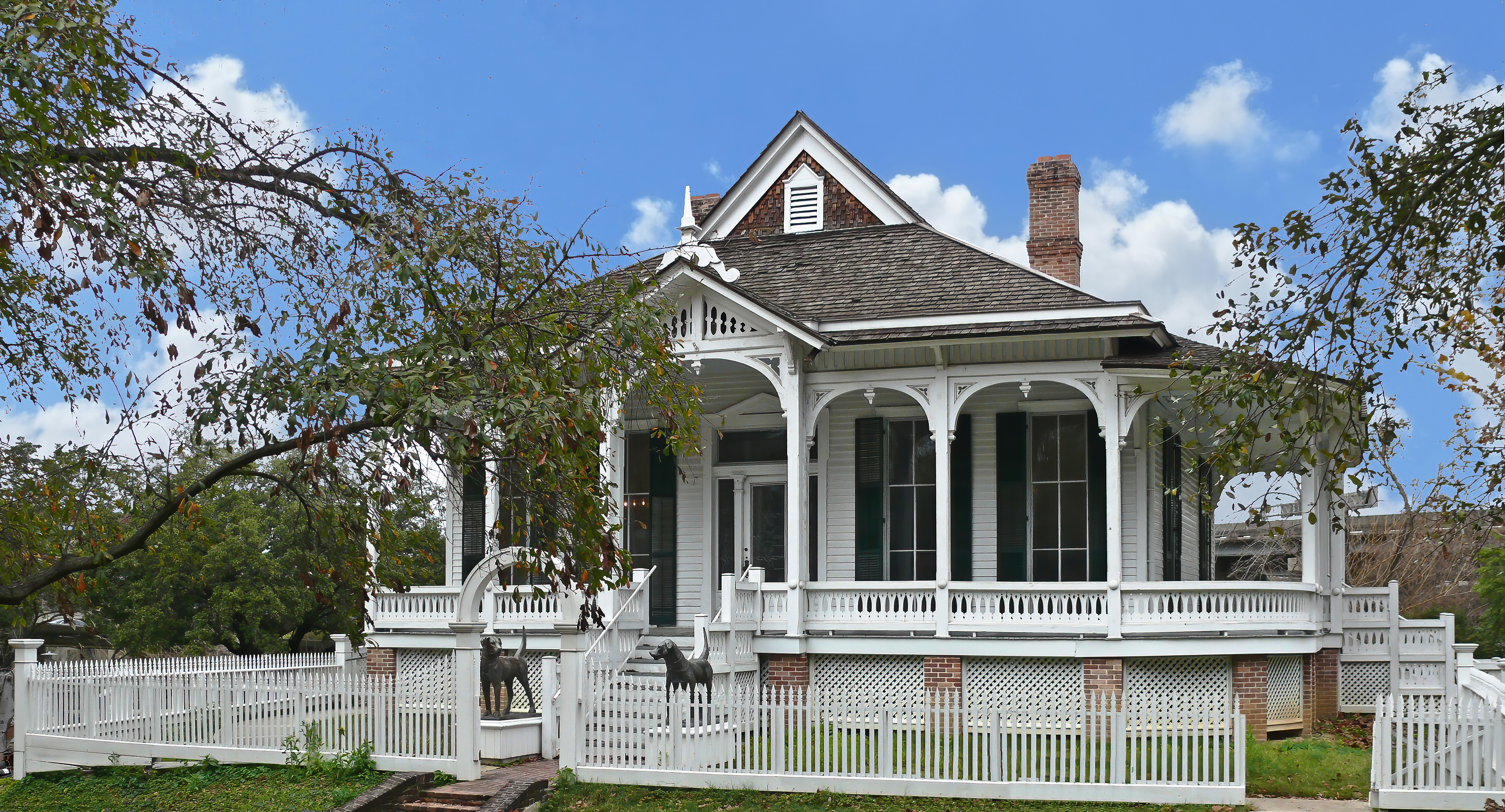
The Pillot House in Sam Houston Park

Members of the Pillot family once lived in the Pillot House, a mid-Victorian house in the intersection of Chenevert and McKinney in what is now Downtown Houston. Eugene Pillot built the house in 1868. In 1965, around the month of June, the house was moved to Sam Houston Park in Downtown Houston, and the Heritage Society operates the house. In 2001 Tropical Storm Allison damaged the building. The society restored the exterior. As of 2011 the interior still needs work; the society is waiting for the necessary funds to come in. The site where the house used to be is part of the current site of the George R. Brown Convention Center.

== Gallery ==
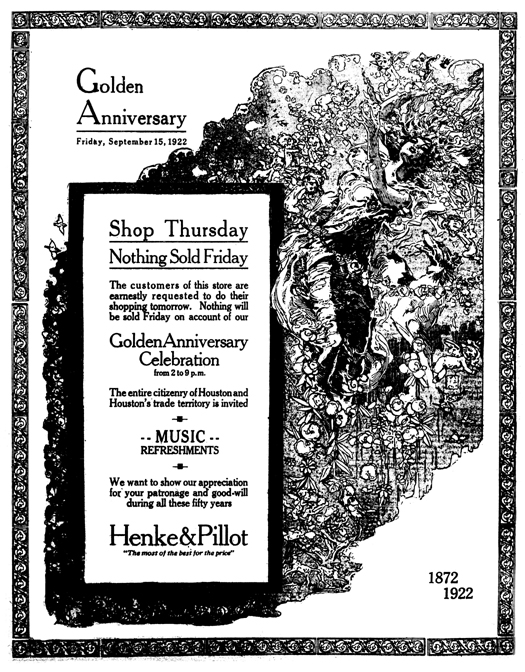
Henke & Pillot Golden Anniversary brochure, 1922
