= Novel Coworking =

American company

Expansive
- Type: Private
- Industry: Workspace company
- Founded: 2013
- Founder: Bill Bennett
- Headquarters: Chicago, Illinois, United States
- Website: expansive.com

Expansive, formerly Novel Coworking, is an American co-working and office rental company. Its main clientele are small businesses, such as entrepreneurs and satellite office teams, needing flexible office space.

== Background ==
Expansive was founded under the name Level Office by Chicago entrepreneur Bill Bennett in 2013. The idea was initially conceived in 2007 when Bennett couldn't find flexible, short-term office space for his first business.

The original venue is located at 73 W. Monroe Street in Chicago's Loop, and was opened in September 2013, followed by two more locations in the Loop in 2014. In late 2014 and early 2015, the company expanded to Texas with two locations in downtown Houston and one in downtown Dallas.

In August 2015, Expansive opened its seventh center, in Charlotte, North Carolina's Uptown neighborhood. In December 2015, Expansive purchased the historic Pioneer Building in Seattle's Pioneer Square neighborhood. The company renovated the building's interior to create private offices and co-working space for Seattle small businesses.

The company added a location in Jacksonville, Florida's historic Groover Stewart building in February 2016. Expansive now has 41 locations throughout 39 cities nationwide.

In August 2018, the company rebranded as Novel Co-working.

In June 2021, the company rebranded as Expansive.

== Financial Distress ==
Expansive Co-working, a prominent player in the co-working industry, faced significant financial distress during the era of COVID-19, exacerbated by the widespread adoption of remote work, volatility in the office market leasing atmosphere, and rising interest rates on adjustable-rate commercial loans. Similar to challenges faced by competitors WeWork, Regus and Industrious, co-working companies have had to grapple with a mixture of socio-economic factors which have impacted the broader economy and office culture. The vast departure of large office tenants and reduction in rentable square feet those tenants occupied in key cities coupled with a rising interest rate environment led to significant mark-to market declines in value among office buildings in major metropolitan areas.

=== Background ===
Expansive, like many co-working businesses, experienced rapid growth in the years leading up to the COVID-19 pandemic. With a business model centered around providing flexible office space solutions to a diverse clientele, the company expanded its footprint across multiple cities and countries, capitalizing on the increasing demand for shared workspaces.

=== Impact of COVID-19 and Work From Home Trends ===
The onset of the COVID-19 pandemic brought about a seismic shift in work dynamics, with a substantial portion of the workforce transitioning to remote work arrangements. This sudden and widespread adoption of remote work significantly reduced the demand for traditional office spaces, posing a significant challenge to the company's revenue streams. With businesses downsizing their physical footprints or opting for remote-first policies, the company faced mounting vacancies across its co-working locations, leading to a decline in occupancy rates and revenue.

=== Office Loan Defaults ===
For years, despite its initial success, Expansive began to start encountering difficulties in meeting its debt obligations, particularly in relation to office loans secured for its various co-working locations as vacancy increased at its locations.

Under financial distress in 2023, the company entered into foreclosure proceedings with LoanCore Capital for 1801 Broadway in Denver, a 17-story office building.

Co-working companies continued to struggle into the later part of 2023. The company then entered into foreclosure talks at the 14-story Circle Tower Office Building at Monument Circle in Indianapolis after defaulting on a commercial mortgage tied to the property.

Kansas City, once a thriving co-working city, began to experience rising office vacancy rates as work from home trends accelerated. The company was then forced into an foreclosure auction for an 8-story downtown building.

Yielding to broader office market vacancy in the city of Washington D.C., Brightspire Capital bought the Longfellow building from the company for an estimated $21.20 million, nearly a 70% discount to what the company acquired the property for just years earlier.

Office vacancy trends continued to accelerate into 2024 with a flight to quality being seen across Class A office buildings, the company was then forced into a foreclosure auction for a coworking space in Houston, the Scanlan Building after RGA Reinsurance Co filed to foreclose on the property at 405 Main St.

Under financial distress, the company was forced to surrender a coworking building in Chicago's North River neighborhood at 420 West Huron Street after the company defaulted on a commercial mortgage issued by WinTrust Financial.

Bill Co. credit union filed a lawsuit against the company to force a foreclosure on an office building in Boulder, Colorado at 1495 Canyon Blvd after the company missed mortgage and interest payments on a commercial mortgage tied to the property.
