= Cohn House (Folsom, California) =

Historic house in California, United States

- U.S. National Register of Historic Places
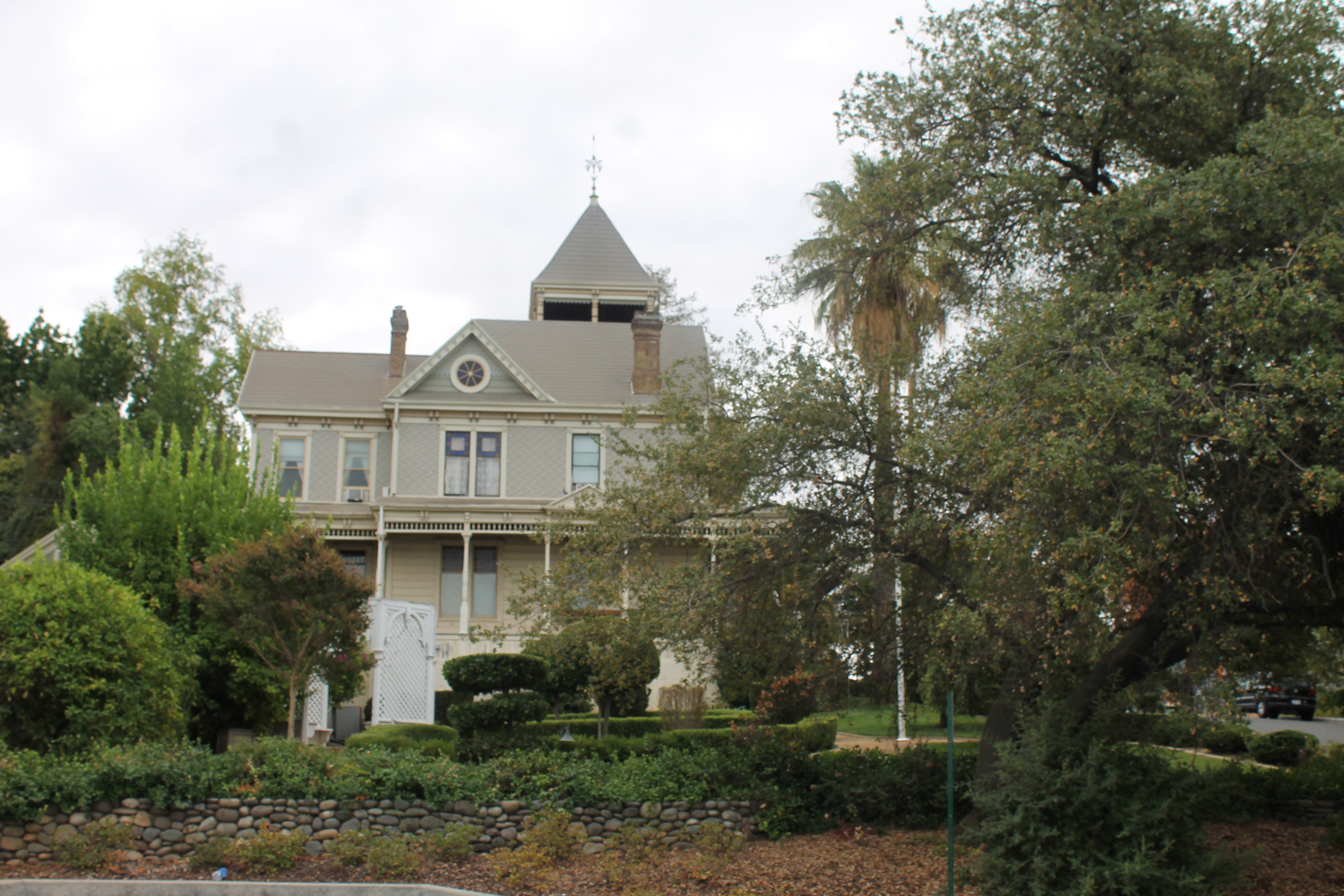

- Location within California Location within the United States
- Location: 305 Scott St., Folsom, California
- Coordinates: 38°40′41.83″N 121°10′28.86″W
- Area: 0.3 acres (0.12 ha)
- Built: 1860s, 1890s
- Architectural style: Queen Anne—Shingle Style
- NRHP reference No.: 82002228
- Added to NRHP: January 21, 1982

The Cohn House in Folsom, California is a building, in the Queen Anne Shingle Style of Victorian architecture, built in the 1890s in Folsom, California.

The Cohn House was listed on the National Register of Historic Places in 1982.

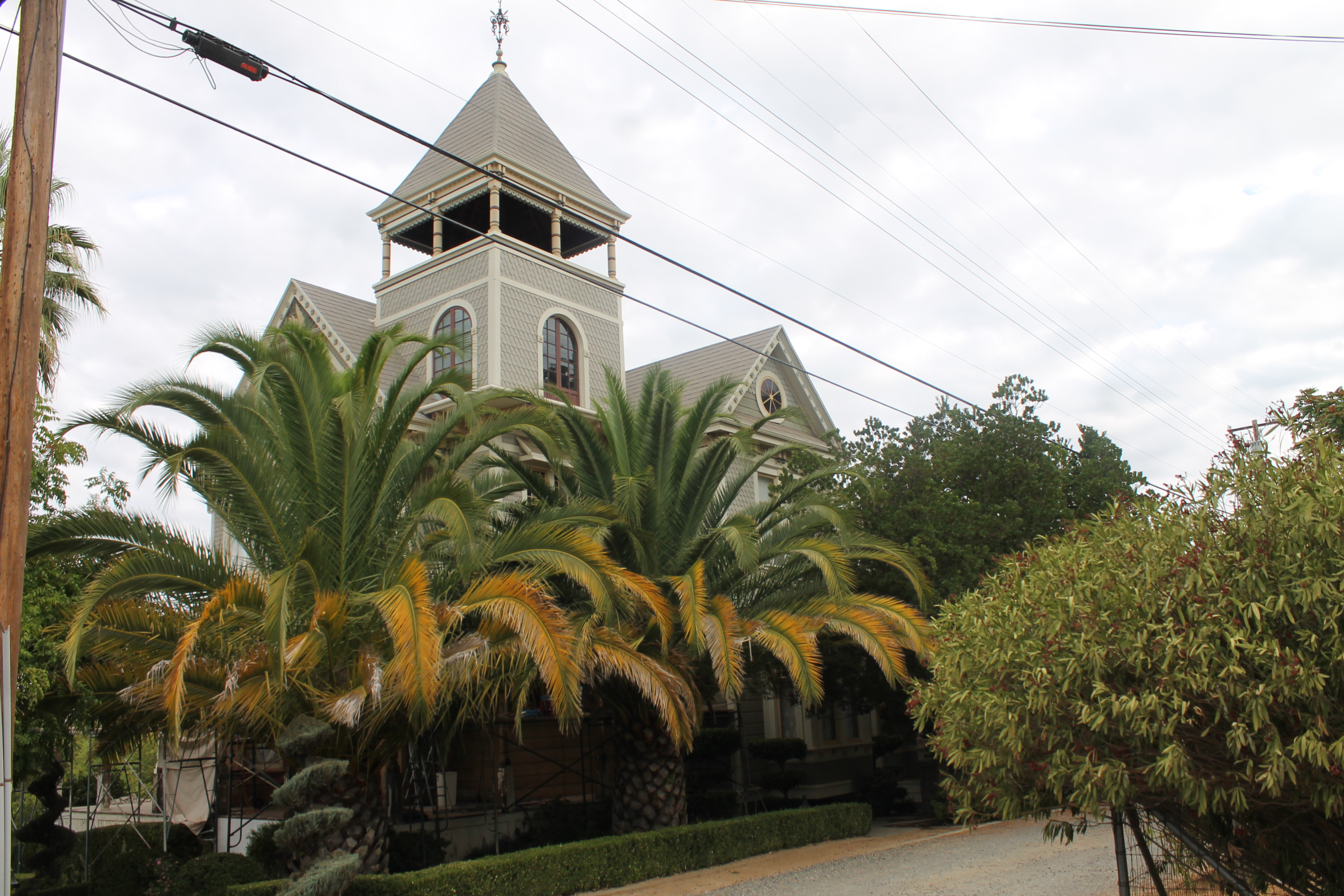
The house's tower

The listing includes an original house built in the 1860s.
