= Scanlan Building =

Historic building in Houston, Texas, U.S.

- U.S. National Register of Historic Places
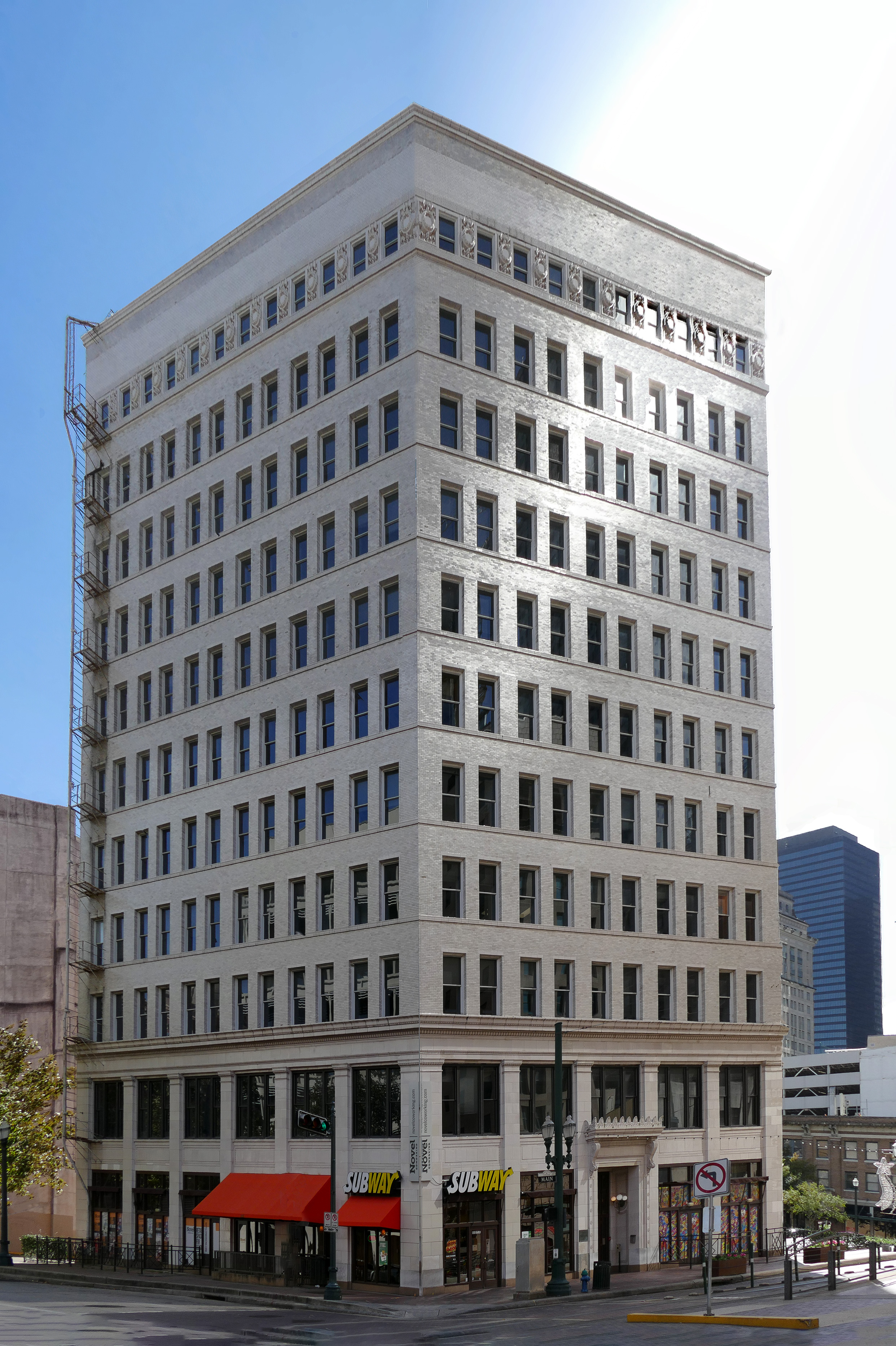
- The building's exterior in 2020

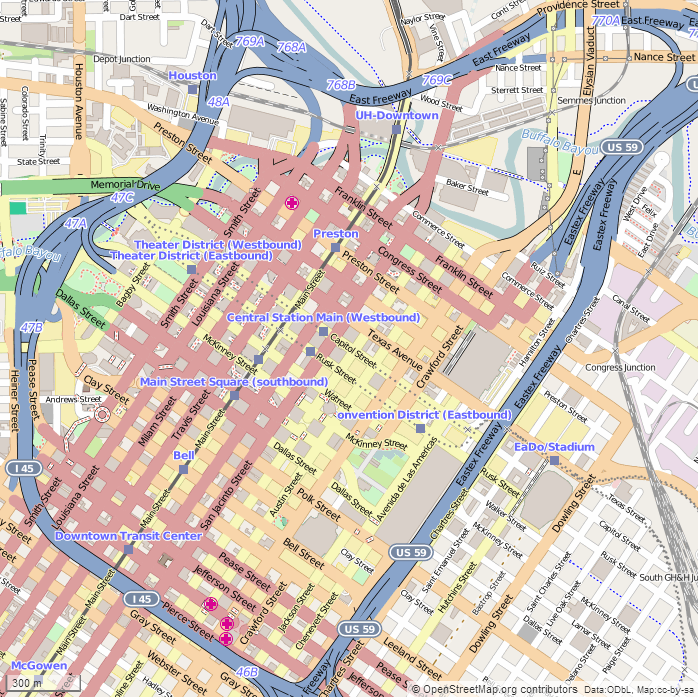
- Location within Houston Downtown Location within Texas Location within the United States
- Location: 405 Main St., Houston, Texas
- Coordinates: 29°45′40″N 95°21′40″W
- Area: 0.2 acres (0.081 ha)
- Built: 1909
- Built by: B.H. Lichter & Co.
- Architect: D.H. Burnham & Co.
- Architectural style: Chicago
- NRHP reference No.: 80004132
- Added to NRHP: May 23, 1980

The Scanlan Building is a building in Downtown Houston.

== History ==
The building was first envisioned by Thomas Howe Scanlan, two-time mayor of Houston, to be built on the property he owned at Main and Preston streets. After his death in 1906, his seven daughters built the building as a memorial to him. Approximately 85 feet by 101 feet, the building was among the first in Houston to use a fireproof steel skeleton.

The Scanlan Building, located at 405 Main Street in Houston, Texas, is an eleven-story, 76,403sq.ft building completed in 1909. Built on the site of the first official home of the president of the Republic of Texas, it was the first building of its size and type to be designed by a major national architect to be built in Houston, and set the style for future construction in the area. It is the only known office building in Houston which was designed by D.H. Burnham & Company of Chicago. The building was the first to be built higher than ten stories, breaking the limit preferred by Houston developer Jesse H. Jones.

D. H. Burham & Company started work on the Scanlan Building just after the Columbian Exhibition of 1893. The steel-frame building was built in the Chicago style, with an L-shaped inner structure, permitting ventilation to the interior of the building. Facial details were restricted to the street sides of the building. Above the ground floor, all floors had an identical plan, with halls with offices on both sides, and one outer executive suite, including an interior office separated from the corridor by a receptionist office.

It was listed on the National Register of Historic Places on May 23, 1980.

== Current use ==
Workspace provider Novel Coworking purchased the Scanlan Building in June 2014 and renovated the building's interior to provide private offices and co-working space for entrepreneurs and small businesses that need flexible, short-term workspace.

As of February 2024, the owners, Level One, a subsidiary of Expansive (a renaming of Novel), defaulted on its loan due in November 2023. The Scanlan Building was scheduled for foreclosure auction in March 2024.

== See also ==
- National Register of Historic Places listings in Harris County, Texas

== Bibliography ==
- Bradley, Barrie Scardino (2020). Improbable Metropolis: Houston's Architectural and Urban History. Austin: University of Texas Press. ISBN 978-1-4773-2019-8.
