= James Bute Company Warehouse =

Historic building in Houston, Texas, U.S.

- U.S. National Register of Historic Places
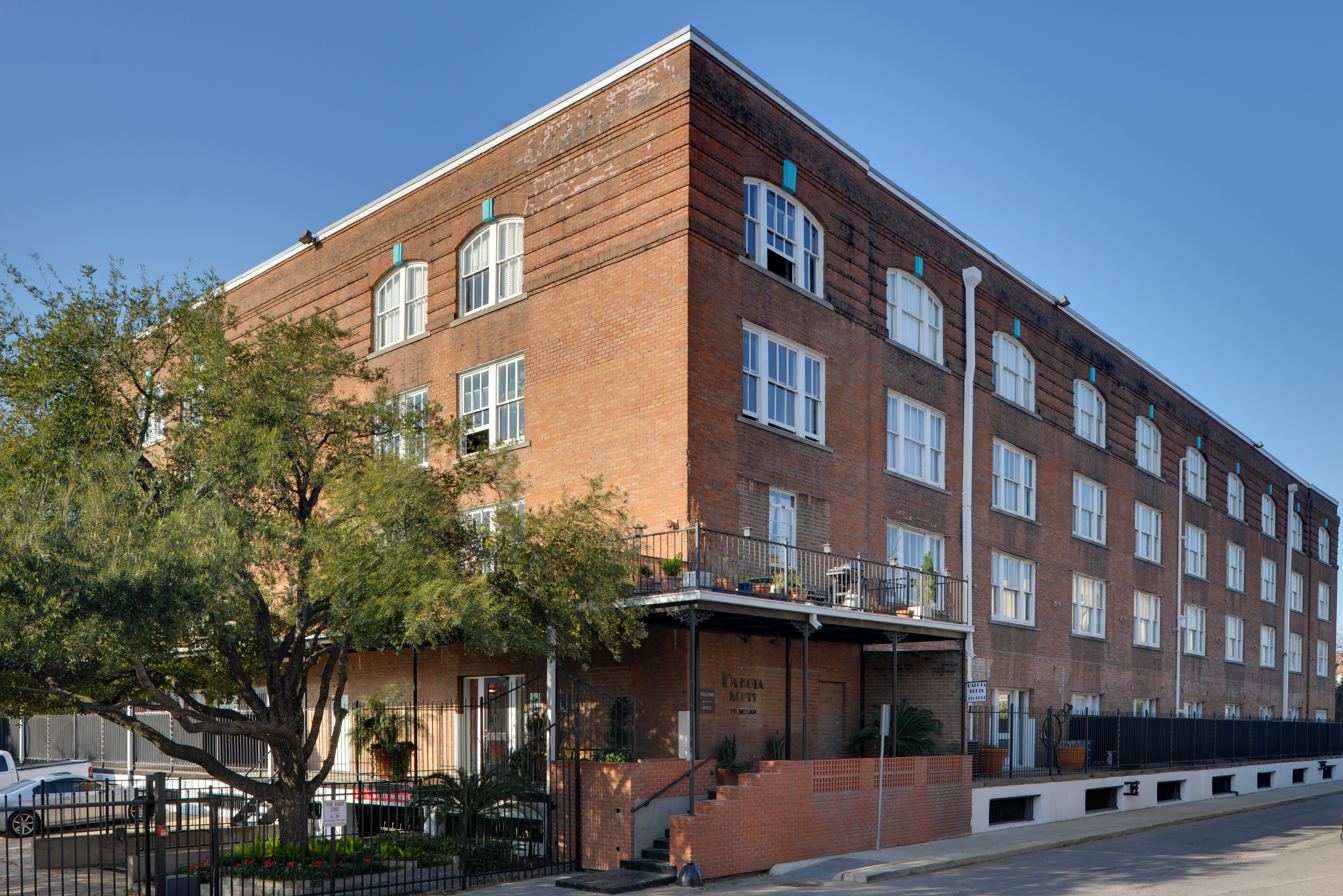
- The building's exterior in 2011

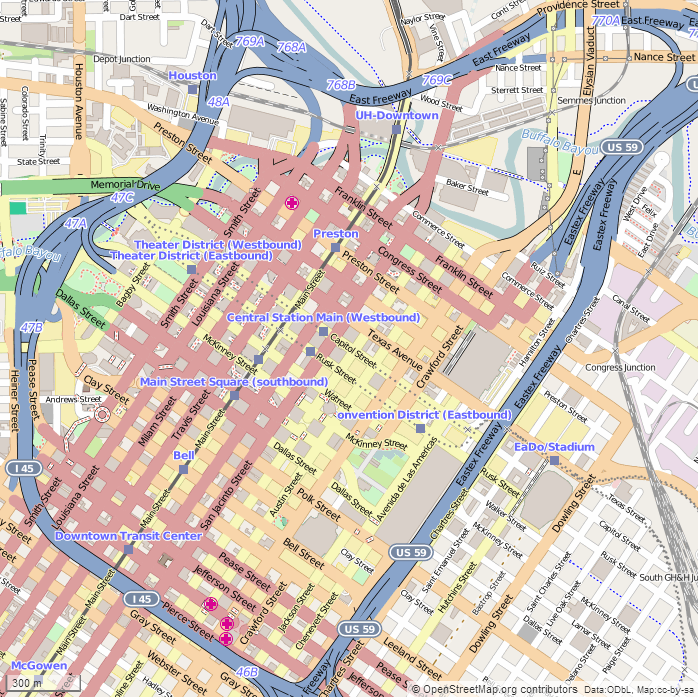
- Location within Houston Downtown Location within Texas Location within the United States
- Location: 711 William St., Houston, Texas
- Coordinates: 29°46′2″N 95°21′14.1″W
- Area: less than one acre
- Built: 1909
- Built by: Lucas & Smith
- Architect: Olle Lorehn
- Architectural style: Early Commercial
- NRHP reference No.: 94000677
- Added to NRHP: July 7, 1994

The James Bute Company Warehouse, located at 711 William Street in Houston, Texas, was listed on the National Register of Historic Places on July 7, 1994. The Bute Paint Company, founded by James Bute, operated from 1867 until 1990. Its warehouse building on William Street was built in 1909. Abandoned after 1990, the property was converted to loft apartments in 1993.

== See also ==
- National Register of Historic Places listings in Harris County, Texas
