= Pillot Building =

Historic building in Houston, Texas, U.S.

- Formerly listed on the U.S. National Register of Historic Places
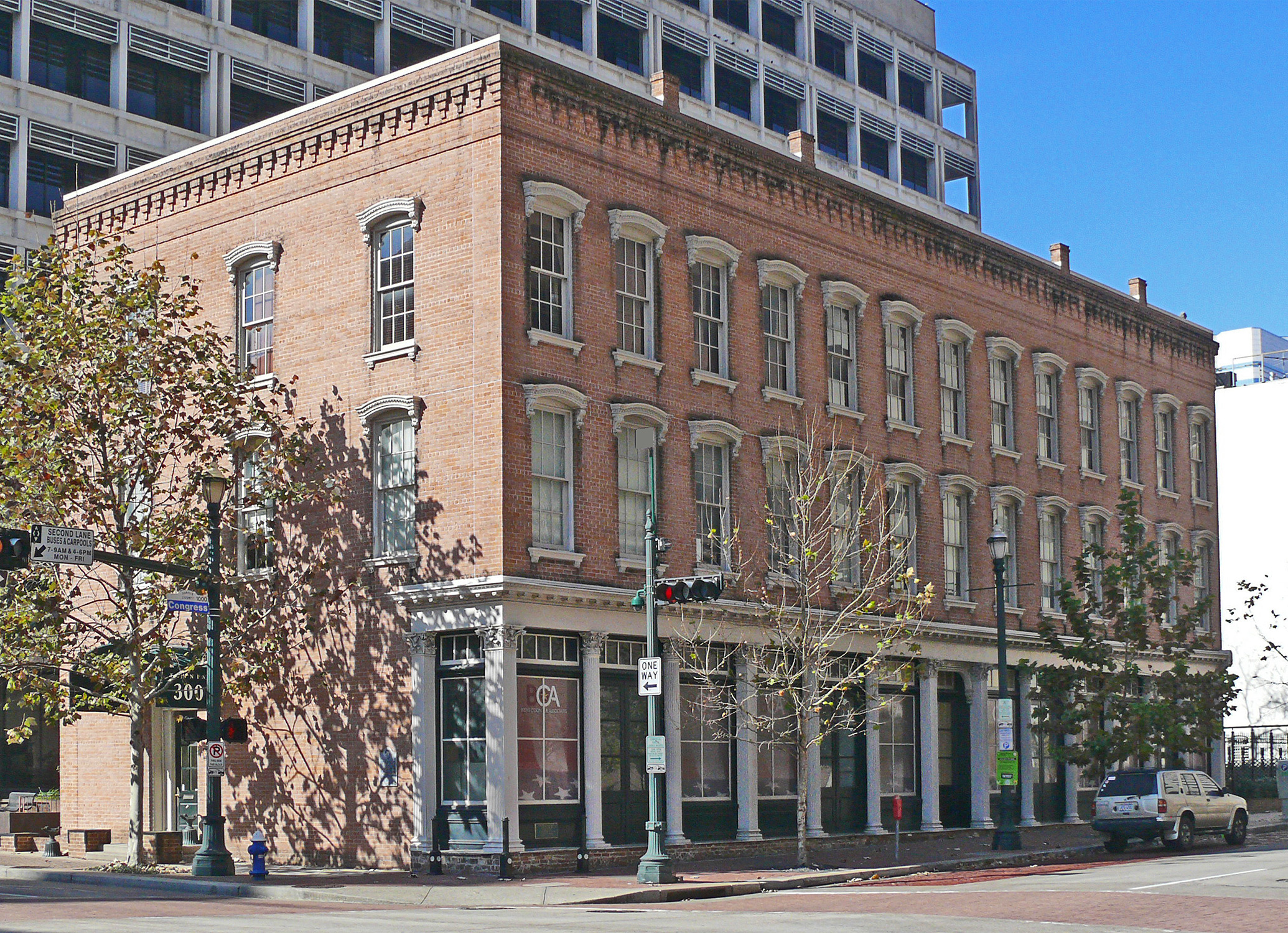
- The reconstructed building in 2013

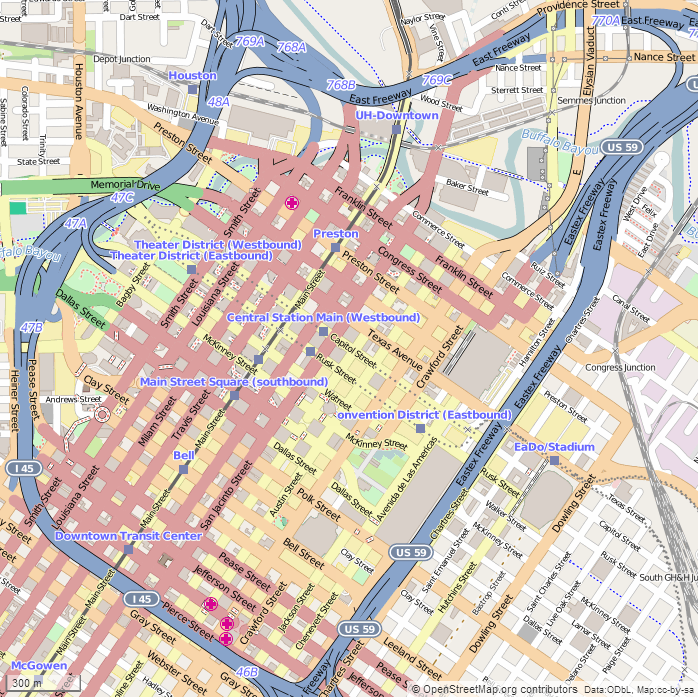
- Location within Houston Downtown Location within Texas Location within the United States
- Location: 1006 Congress St., Houston, Texas
- Coordinates: 29°45′42″N 95°21′37″W
- Area: 0.1 acres (0.040 ha)
- Built: 1857
- Architectural style: Renaissance
- NRHP reference No.: 74002073

Significant dates
- Added to NRHP: June 13, 1974
- Removed from NRHP: October 28, 1994

The Pillot Building, located at 1006 Congress Avenue in Downtown Houston, Texas, was listed on the National Register of Historic Places on June 13, 1974. However, the structure suffered severe damage in the 1980s and collapsed during reconstruction in 1988. A replica of the original building, incorporating some of the original cast iron columns, sills, and lintels, was completed in 1990. The replica was removed from the National Register of Historic Places in 1994.

The building was constructed between 1857 and 1869 by Eugene Pillot (1820-1896), and served a variety of tenants including a dry good merchant and professional offices. It was notable for cast iron front structure.

== See also ==
- National Register of Historic Places listings in Harris County, Texas
