= Arthur B. Cohn House =

Historic house in Houston, Texas, U.S.

- U.S. National Register of Historic Places
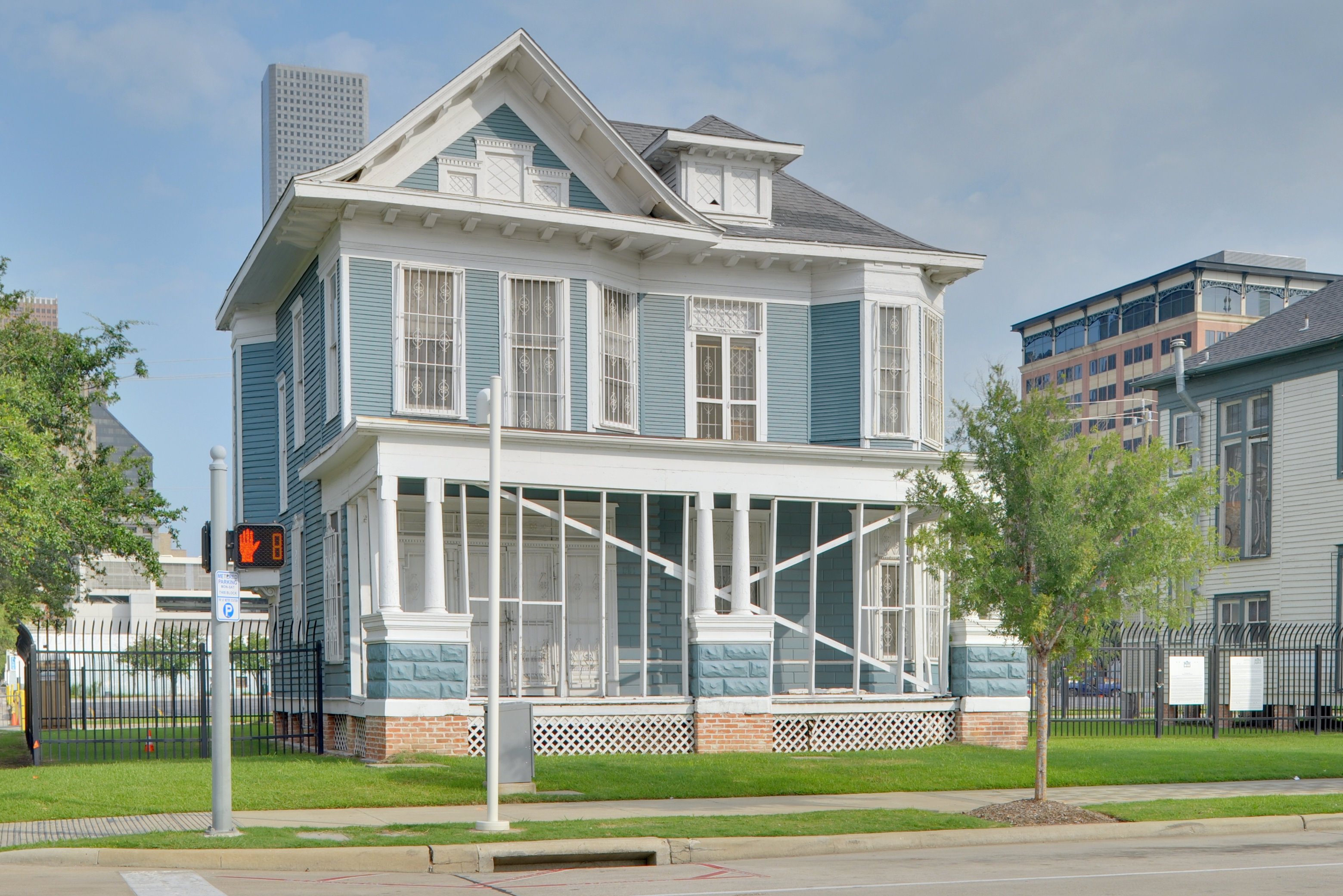
- Arthur B. Cohn House at its original location of 1711 Rusk in 2010

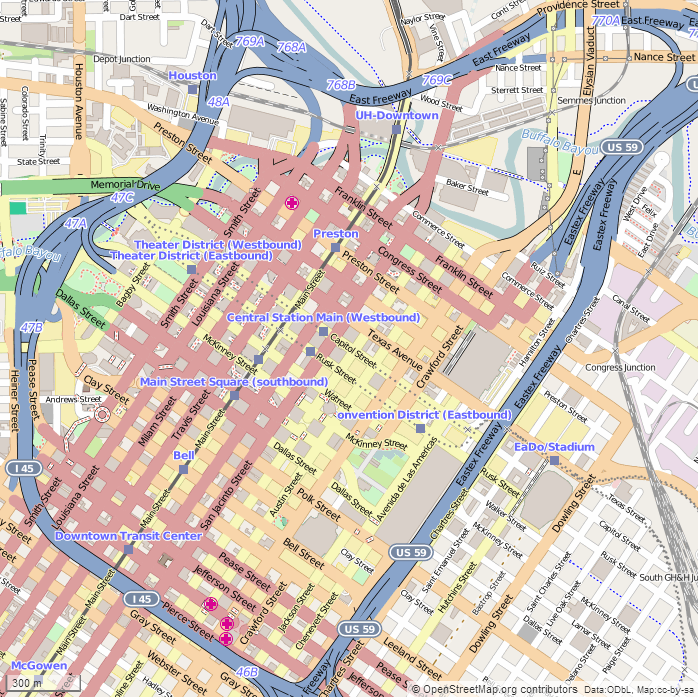
- Location within Houston Downtown Location within Texas Location within the United States
- Location: 900 block of Avenida de las Americas, Houston, Texas
- Coordinates: 29°45′20″N 95°21′22″W
- Built: 1905
- Built by: Michael DeChaumes
- Architect: Michael DeChaumes
- Architectural style: Queen Anne
- NRHP reference No.: 85002771
- Added to NRHP: November 7, 1985

The Arthur B. Cohn House (also known locally as the "Blue House") is a property listed on the National Register of Historic Places located in downtown Houston. The house is now about a block away from its original location at 1711 Rusk Avenue to the 600 block of Avenidas de las Americas, adjacent to Daikin Park, and will shortly be moved to a former parking lot site at the corner of Commerce and Hamilton Streets. The Queen Anne house was built for Cohn in 1905 by local architect, Michael DeChaumes.

== History ==
The Arthur B. Cohn House is named for Arthur Benjamin Cohn (1871–1938), who resided at this house from 1905. Cohn was the personal accountant of William Marsh Rice and was instrumental in the founding of the Rice University. In 1905, the Rice Board of Trustees hired Cohn for its full-time staff. The original lot at 1711 Rusk Avenue had been previously developed in the 1860s for the home of Winifred Browne. Oral history relate that three elements of the house predate 1905, suggesting either that the builders incorporated part of the old Browne house into the new construction or these elements were reconstructed from salvaged materials. The kitchen decking is dated circa 1870. Old residents of the neighborhood refer to the property as “the Browne house,” and claim that the front doors and one of the fireplaces was from this earlier structure. One author of the NRHP form dismisses this possibility, and asserts that only the kitchen floors predated 1905. Another part of the NRHP form asserts that the kitchen wing at the rear of the house incorporates part of the Browne house.

The original site of the Cohn House at 1711 Rusk placed the property on Block 120, Lot 12 of the J. S. Holman Survey, originally bounded by Jackson, Capitol, Chenevert, and Rusk streets. Much of this lot was used by the city of Houston for Avenida de las Americas as part of the planning for the George R. Brown Convention Center. This area was the subject of an extensive archaeological survey in 2003. Block 120 in the Holman Survey was laid out identically to the blocks in the original survey of Houston. The dimensions were 250 feet square, divided into twelve lots, ten of which were 50 feet wide and 100 feet deep. The other two were key lots, placed in the middle of the block with dimensions fifty feet in width and 125 feet in depth. Block 120 was incorporated into Houston in 1840, and it is within the Third Ward neighborhood.

== Bibliography ==
- Kirkland, Kate Sayan (2012). Captain James A. Baker of Houston, 1857–1941. College Station: Texas A&M University Press.
- "National Register of Historic Places Registration Form: Arthur B. Cohn House" (PDF). September 1985.
