= Bank Street Historic District (Waterbury, Connecticut) =

Historic district in Connecticut, United States

- U.S. National Register of Historic Places
- U.S. Historic district
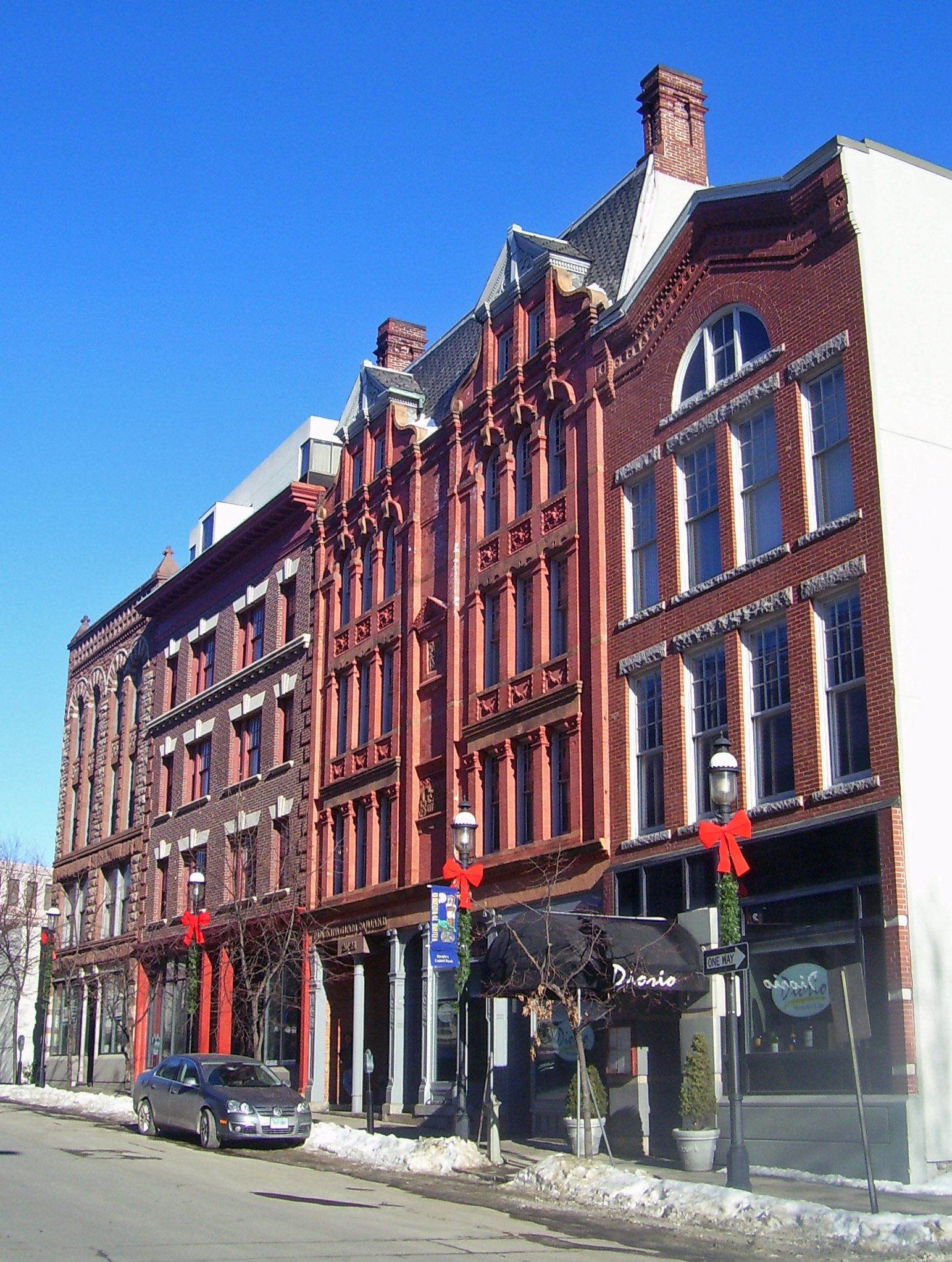
- West elevations, 2009. From left: Pritchard, Whittemore, Griggs and Republican buildings.

- Location within Connecticut Location within the United States
- Interactive map showing the location of Bank Street Historic District
- Location: Waterbury, CT
- Coordinates: 41°33′10″N 73°2′28″W
- Area: 0.25 acres (1,000 m^{2})
- Built: 1883–1904
- Architect: Joseph A. Jackson, Robert W. Hill, Griggs and Hunt
- Architectural style: Georgian Revival, Richardsonian Romanesque, Queen Anne, eclectic
- NRHP reference No.: 83001277
- Added to NRHP: 1983

The Bank Street Historic District is a group of four attached brick commercial buildings in different architectural styles on that street in Waterbury, Connecticut, United States. They were built over a 20-year period around the end of the 19th century, when Waterbury was a prosperous, growing industrial center. In 1983 they were recognized as a historic district and listed on the National Register of Historic Places.

Among the four is a rare Queen Anne Style commercial building, and one of the only three Richardsonian Romanesque commercial buildings in the city. Some of Waterbury's leading architects of the time were among the designers. The four have remained intact even as later, modern development interceded between them and the contemporary buildings elsewhere downtown.

== Buildings ==
The four buildings and their respective lots occupy an area of a quarter-acre, or a thousand square meters, most of which is covered by their footprints, at 207–231 Bank Street. This is on the east side of Bank between Grand Street and the Interstate 84 viaduct. The terrain slopes slightly to the south.

The neighborhood is densely developed and urban. A large modern commercial block is across the street. Driveways on the north and south give access to parking lots behind the buildings and separate the row from other modern buildings.

At the ends of the block small rows of trees buffer both Grand and the interstate. To the northeast is a small park at Grand and South Main Street. The Bank and Grand intersection is the southeast corner of the much larger Downtown Waterbury Historic District, with a concentration of buildings from the same era as the Bank Street buildings. A block to the west are the five public and private buildings, including City Hall, originally designed by Cass Gilbert as the Waterbury Municipal Center Complex.

All four buildings are at least four stories high. Three are faced in brick, and one in brownstone, with glass storefronts at street level. Small trees are planted at intervals along with sidewalk. They are all considered contributing properties.

=== Pritchard Building ===
The northernmost of the four is at 207–211 Bank Street. This four-story building is the only one of the four to have its west (front) facade in brownstone, done in a rough surface with granite trim, per its Richardsonian Romanesque styling. A main entrance is centrally located between two storefronts; it is topped by two iron plates with rosettes. All upper levels are fenestrated with two bays of paired windows, quoined at the sides, in modern one-over-one double-hung sash. The first and second stories are set off by heavy brownstone lintels; the third and fourth divided by a checkerboard pattern of small alternating granite and brownstone blocks. The second and third stories also have small terra cotta moldings below.

At the fourth story the rounded windows are topped with banded segmental arches. A parapet with two tiers of recessed panels is at the roofline. At either end are small pyramidal towers with crocket finials. The interior has been extensively renovated but some original wainscoting and window trim is left on the third floor.

=== Whittemore Building ===
The Whittemore is the next building south of the Pritchard, at 213–219 Bank Street. The last of the four built, it is a four-story Georgian Revival brick building. At the four-bay facade's street level are two storefronts, with entrances in the middle and at the south. Original cast iron pilasters with a curving, interlaced motif support a modillioned cornice of the same material.

Above, all three stories have a similar treatment. The middle two windows are wider than those on the ends. All have molded limestone sills and splayed lintels with prominent keyblocks. They are filled with eight-over-one double-hung sash; the three-part center windows have four-over-one on the sides. A continuous modillioned cornice forms the sill of the fourth-story windows. Raised brickwork at the corners suggests quoins.

At the top of the facade is an entablature with a wide dentilled and modillioned frieze below a molded overhanging cornice. Inside, the interiors are continuous with the Pritchard Building. Molded window frames on the upper floors are the only original interior finishes remaining.

=== Griggs Building ===
At 221–227 Bank is the Griggs Building, the largest and most ornate of the four. A steeply pitched hipped roof gives this a fifth story. That feature, its generally irregular juxtapositions of shapes and forms and its heavily decorated facade mark it as a rare commercial application of the Queen Anne Style, much more commonly used for houses during its peak period in the late 19th century.

On the ground floor, much of the Griggs' original cast iron storefront remains. Ionic pilasters with fluted necks and intricately carved panels with a foliate motif above the middle support a stone lintel. The northernmost pilaster also includes the monogram of the building's original owner. The entrances themselves are topped by arched transoms with fans carved in the spandrels.

A cornice with egg and dart molding above the lintel further sets off the upper stories. The facade has, on the next three stories, a group of three windows on either side of a slightly recessed central bay blind except for a large terra cotta tablet on the second story with the inscription "Griggs Building". Above it, on the third story, is another tablet with the date of construction, 1884, in a frame topped by a pediment.

Corinthian pilasters divide the windows on all three stories, supporting a plain entablature running across all three. Below the third- and fourth-story windows are terra cotta panels with a festoon carving in the middle surrounded by bead and reel, a motif that continues in the pilaster capitals. The lintels have an unusual ogee curve on their lower edge. All upper-story windows are one-over-one sash with stained glass border panes in the upper section.

The fourth story's round-arched windows have an otherwise similar treatment with some differences in detailing. The panels below are more detailed than their third story counterparts, with a spiral foliate decoration at the center and owls at the sides. The pilasters are similar, with a stringcourse of dentils at the impost line and hood molds over the arches. These break the main cornice, along with the brick piers at the corners and center bay. The windows themselves have stained glass border panes in the upper section.

From large foot scrolls on the arch tops spring the three pilasters that frame the two recessed 16-pane windows in each of the gabled dormers that pierce the roof, finished in fish-scale slate. Similar large stone scrolls form the sides of the dormers. The pilasters support a denticulated cornice, creating a pediment with an elaborate carved vine pattern. Crowning the house are brick chimneys rising above the roof from both ends, continuing the side wall.

As with the other buildings, the interior has been heavily renovated over time and most of the original finishes that remain are in the upper stories. Two skylit staircases, with turned balusters and newels and a curved molded handrail rise to the upper story in the front and rear. Off them, the hallways have simple wainscoting. Fireplaces in the front rooms have a mix of classical, Italianate and Eastlake decorative touches.

=== Republican Building ===
The southernmost of the group at 229–231 Bank Street, the Republican is named after one of Waterbury's daily newspapers at the time, one of the papers that merged to form the present-day Republican-American, which used it as an office. It is the shortest of the buildings, faced in brick at three and a half stories tall, four bays wide, in an eclectic mix of styles. Today its ground floor is home to the popular Diorio restaurant.

Its modern storefront features fluted and paneled pilasters around the main entrance and a lintel with applied geometric designs. Both stories above it have nine-over-one double-hung sash between granite sills and lintels in all four bays. In the center of the third story is a three-part semicircular window set in a splayed-brick arch, its middle section two-over-two sash.

The restrained facade is countered by a decorative peaked parapet above the semicircular window. It starts with a band of terra cotta panels in alternating circular and foliate motifs between sawtooth brick courses. Above them is a corbeled tier, with similar features serving as end brackets.

Inside, the building mostly serves as the restaurant and offices. The ground floor has been extensively remodeled to that use. Its pressed-metal ceiling is original, as are the turned balusters on the stairway.

== History ==
In the 1880s Bank Street south of Grand was undeveloped, a de facto buffer between the industrial areas to the south and the commercial and civic core of downtown to the north. Some of Waterbury's wealthier citizens owned the lots, intending to build large houses. The city's growth made them realize that downtown would continue to expand and that the lots would be better developed as commercial property. They built houses instead in the Hill neighborhood.

Henry C. Griggs, cofounder of the Smith and Griggs Manufacturing Company and a two-term member of the Connecticut General Assembly, which made small items like corset fasteners from the brass the city produced in great abundance, sold part of his lot to Republican editor J. Henry Morrow in 1883. Morrow built the building, the first of the four now in the district, to accommodate not only the paper's printing presses and editorial offices but its printing business. Stylistically it reflects different influences of the time. The corbelling and terra cotta panels are typical Victorian decorations, while the fanlight and fenestration anticipate the Colonial Revival style by a few decades.

The following year Griggs developed his remaining property. He hired Robert W. Hill, a former student of Henry Austin who was one of Waterbury's most accomplished architects of the time, with many public buildings around Connecticut to his credit. Hill's building for Griggs was a rare use of the Queen Anne style in a commercial building. The varied surfaces, rich decoration and mixture of curved and rectilinear mark it as particularly high in that style.

Also in 1884, the Pritchard family developed its lot to the north. They hired Joseph A. Jackson, the son of an Irish immigrant carpenter who had studied under Hill and become another of Waterbury's leading architects. The rough stone facing and round arches are typical of the Romanesque Revival style popular at the time, as interpreted by Henry Hobson Richardson.

Griggs had apparently hoped the building would be among the most desirable locations in Waterbury, but he was never able to attract that kind of tenant. Shortly after it opened, the Franklin Hotel moved in from a few blocks away. At the ground level it was home to a piano tuner, photographer's studio and billiards parlor. Next door, the Republican moved out in 1896. Morrow continued to rent the building, and it eventually acquired his name.

The Pritchards sold their building in 1901. John Whittemore, the new owner, was another successful Waterbury industrialist who dabbled in real estate. In 1904, he added the south wing, designed by Henry Griggs' son Walter, who by then was also a part-owner of his father's building to the south. He had become one of the city's most accomplished architects, later to build such downtown landmarks as the nearby county courthouse, the Elton Hotel and the Lilley Building, Waterbury's first steel frame commercial structure. The Georgian Revival structure he designed for his neighbor is an exemplary modest commercial effort, with its brick facing, small-pane windows and classically inspired cornice typifying a style he did not usually work in.

Later a northern addition, since demolished, was built. The entire building was known and rented as the Pritchard Block. Diorio's Restaurant was established in the Republican/Morrow Building in the early 1920s. During the entire 1980s, it was closed and restored to its original appearance from that time. At the time the district was listed on the Register in the early 1980s, a billboard was on the outside of the fourth floor of the Griggs building; it has since been removed.

== See also ==
- National Register of Historic Places listings in New Haven County, Connecticut
