= Wilfred E. Griggs =

American architect (1866–1918)

Wilfred Elizur Griggs
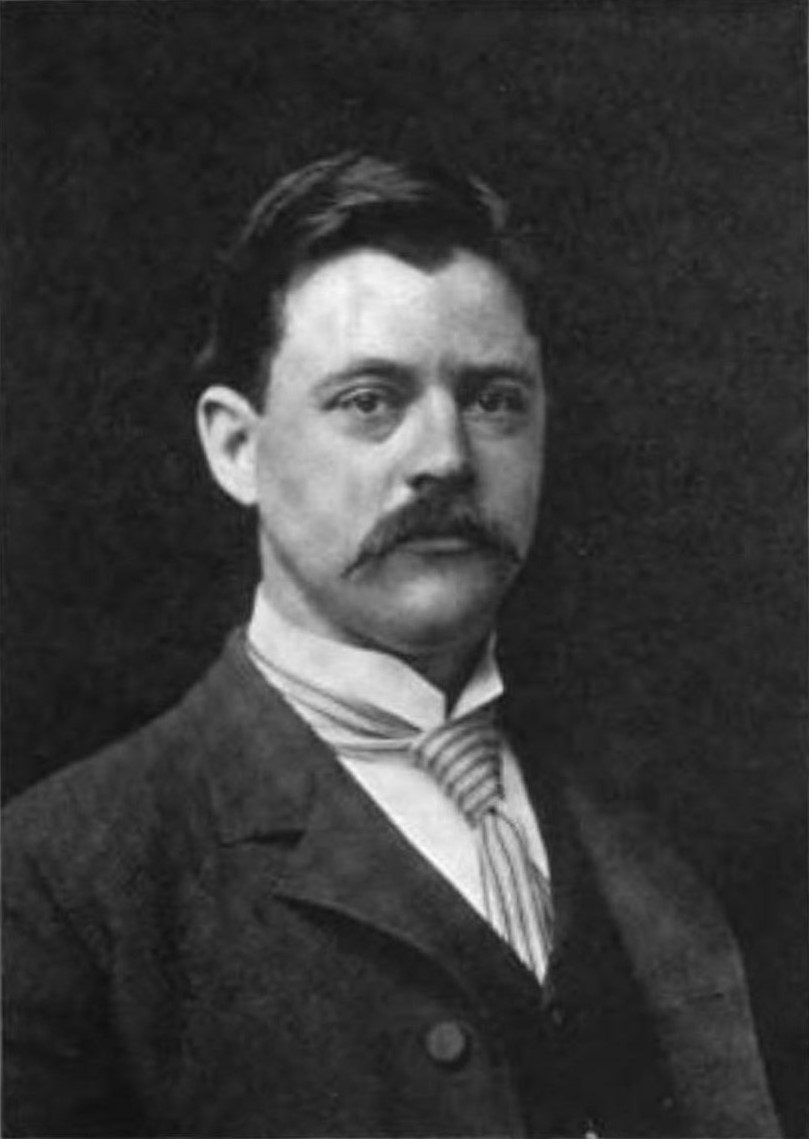
- Wilfred E. Griggs, 1898
- Born: May 2, 1866; Waterbury, Connecticut, U.S.
- Died: June 24, 1918 (aged 52); Waterbury, Connecticut, U.S.
- Occupation: Architect
- Buildings: Elton Hotel, Lilley Building

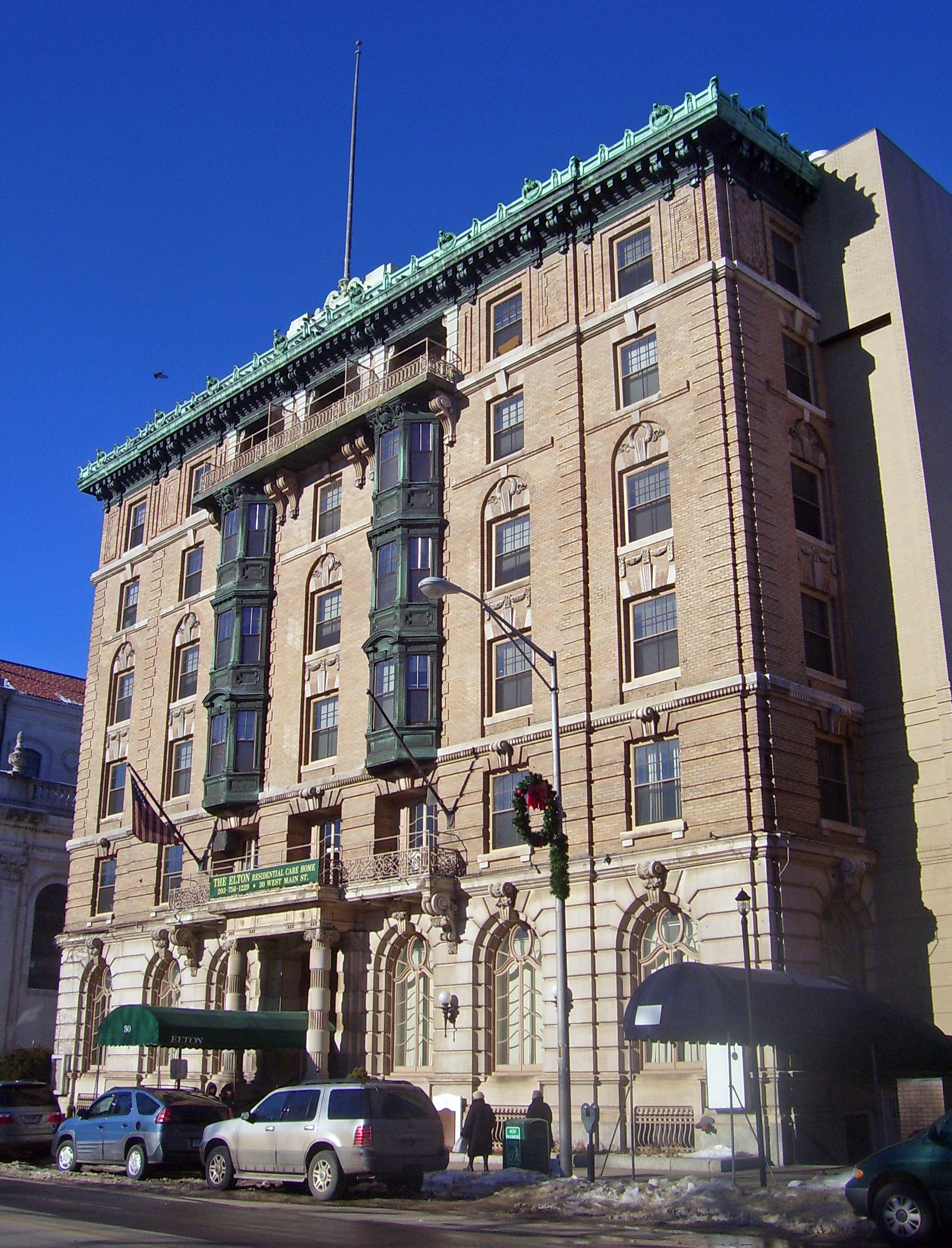
Elton Hotel, Waterbury, 1903-04.

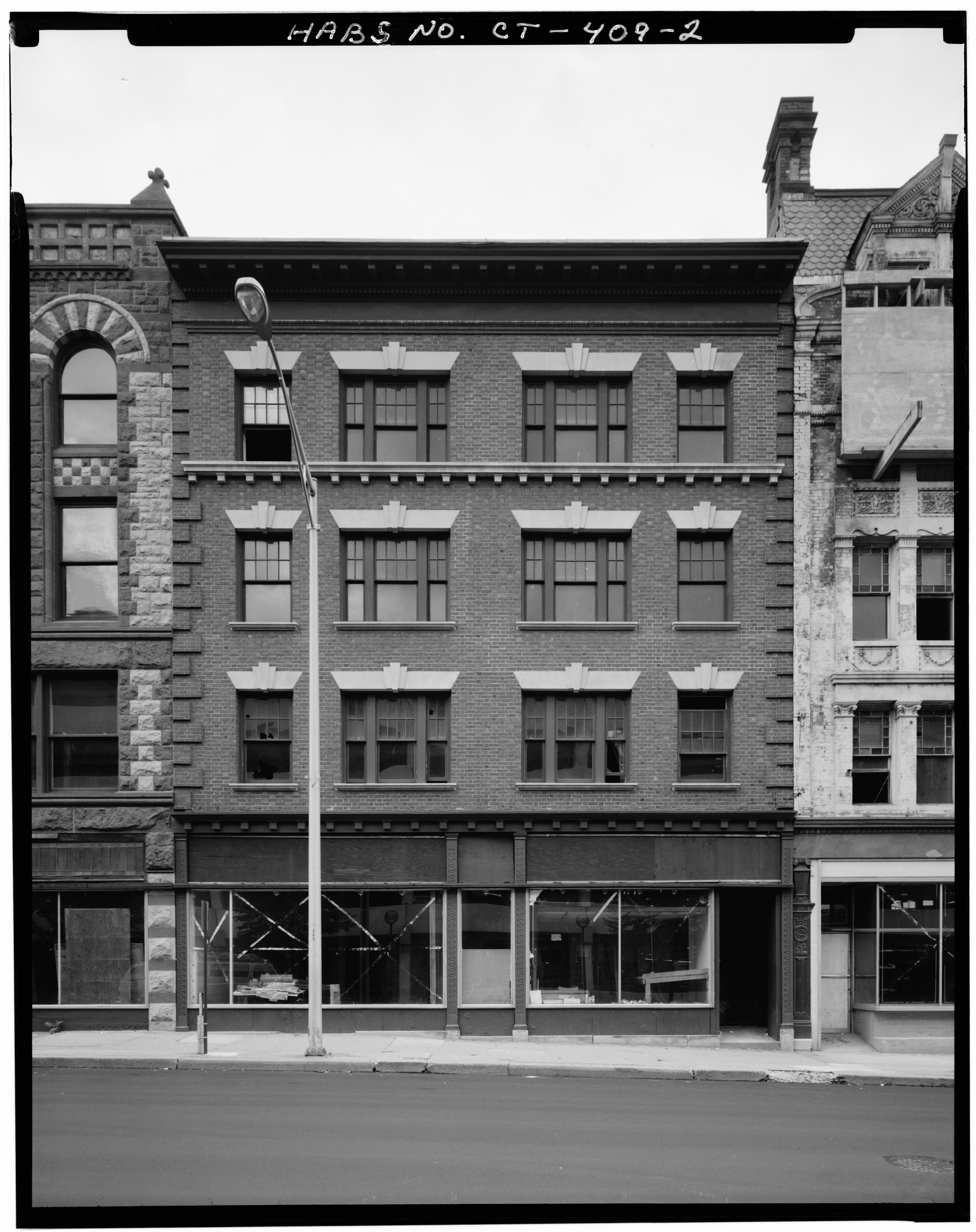
Whittemore Building, Waterbury, 1904.

Wilfred Elizur Griggs (1866–1918) was an American architect from Waterbury, Connecticut.

== Life and career ==
Griggs was born in Waterbury on May 2, 1866, to Henry C. and Mary Bassett (Foote) Griggs. He attended the Waterbury English and Classical School until about 1882, when he went to work for the Waterbury Clock Company. In 1884 he began attending classes at the Sheffield Scientific School, in New Haven, receiving his degree in 1887. After, he went to Columbia University in New York, where he studied architecture, graduating in 1889. For the next few years he worked for New York architects, possibly including Charles D. Marvin, a slightly older architect.

In 1891 he returned to Waterbury, where he opened an office. A few months later he entered into a partnership with the much older Robert W. Hill, with the stated aim of taking over Hill's office at his retirement. This occurred in about 1892. For a brief period circa 1895 he reassociated with Hill, who soon returned to retirement, this time permanently. Griggs practiced alone until 1900, when he associated with William E. Hunt, as Griggs & Hunt. Griggs & Hunt grew into Waterbury's leading architectural firm, and lasted until Hunt moved to Torrington in late 1914. After that, Griggs practiced alone until his death on June 24, 1918. He was interred at Riverside Cemetery in Waterbury.

Though temporarily managed by Griggs' estate, in early 1919 Fred A. Webster, Griggs' chief draughtsman, took over the business under his own name.

== Architectural works ==
Wilfred E. Griggs, 1891-1900

- 1892 - Y. M. C. A. Building, 136 W Main St, Waterbury, Connecticut
  - Demolished
- 1894 - Odd Fellows Building, 36 N Main St, Waterbury, Connecticut
- 1895 - U. S. Rubber Administration Building, Maple St, Naugatuck, Connecticut
  - Demolished in 2014
- 1896 - Hopson Block, 180 Church St, Naugatuck, Connecticut
- 1896 - Terry Block, 76 Main St, Ansonia, Connecticut
  - The upper two floors have been removed
- 1897 - Hurlbut National Bank Building, Main St, Winsted, Connecticut
  - Demolished
- 1898 - Webster School, 90 Platt St, Waterbury, Connecticut

Griggs & Hunt, 1900-1914

- 1900 - Thomaston Public Library, 248 Main St, Thomaston, Connecticut
- 1901 - David C. Griggs House, 175 Pine St, Waterbury, Connecticut
- 1902 - Albert L. Sessions House, 25 Bellevue Ave, Bristol, Connecticut
- 1903 - Camp Building, 140 Bank St, Waterbury, Connecticut
  - The home of Reid & Hughes
- 1903 - Elton Hotel, 30 W. Main St, Waterbury, Connecticut
  - In association with Bowditch & Stratton of Boston
- 1904 - Frank B. Noble House, 191 Woodruff Ave, Watertown, Connecticut
- 1904 - Whittemore Building, 213-219 Bank St, Waterbury, Connecticut
- 1905 - Bristol Co. Office Building, 40 Bristol St, Platts Mills, Connecticut
- 1905 - Waterbury Boys' Club, Cottage Pl, Waterbury, Connecticut
  - Demolished
- 1906 - Thomas Neary Memorial Building, 203 Church St, Naugatuck, Connecticut
- 1907 - Baldwin School (Former), 68 North St, Watertown, Connecticut
- 1908 - Marjorie Hayden House, 70 Pine St, Waterbury, Connecticut
- 1909 - New Haven County Courthouse (Remodeling), 7 Kendrick Ave, Waterbury, Connecticut
- 1909 - Universalist Chapel, 12 Hewlett St, Waterbury, Connecticut
- 1910 - Hampson Building, 99 W Main St, Waterbury, Connecticut
  - Demolished
- 1910 - Hitchcock and Northrop Apartments, 164-182 W Main St, Waterbury, Connecticut
- 1910 - Torrington Electric Light Building, 69 Water St, Torrington, Connecticut
- 1911 - Lilley Building, 81 W Main St, Waterbury, Connecticut
- 1912 - Masonic Temple, 160 W Main St, Waterbury, Connecticut
- 1912 - Standard Building, 14-20 N Main St, Waterbury, Connecticut
  - Demolished
- 1913 - First Congregational Church Parish House (Remodeling), 40 Deforest St, Watertown, Connecticut
- 1914 - Pilling Brass Factory, 480 Watertown Ave, Waterbury, Connecticut
  - Griggs would continue to build additions here until his death

Wilfred E. Griggs, 1914-1918

- 1916 - Paul D. Hamilton House, 98 Woodlawn Ter, Waterbury, Connecticut
- 1916 - Lincoln (Kingsbury) School, 220 Columbia Blvd, Waterbury, Connecticut
- 1917 - Steele Building, 41 W Main St, Waterbury, Connecticut
  - Demolished
- 1918 - Lewis L. Loomer House, 60 Coniston Ave, Waterbury, Connecticut
- 1918 - Joseph Telford House, 538 Main St, Waterbury, Connecticut
