= Elton Hotel =

- U.S. National Register of Historic Places
- U.S. Historic district – Contributing property
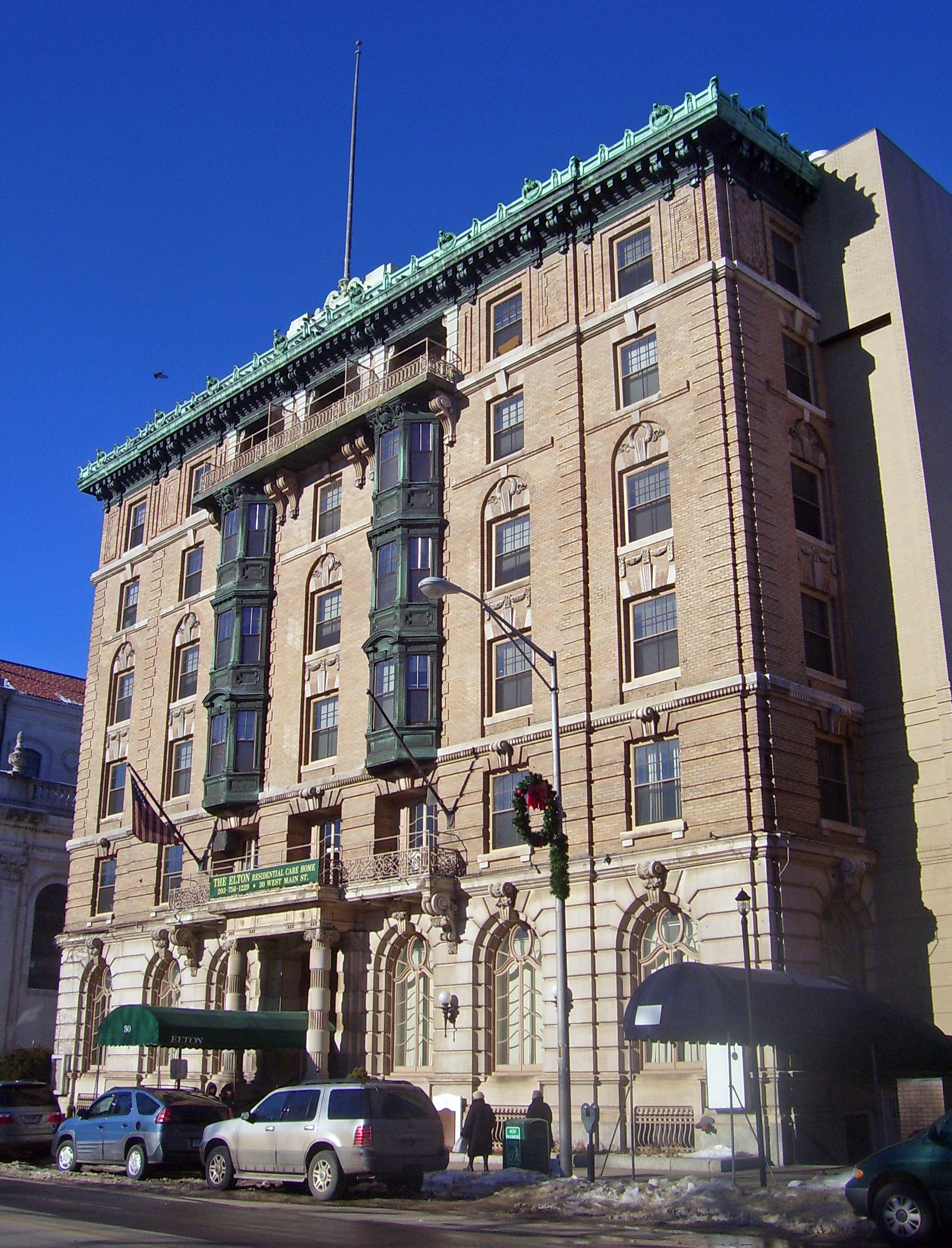
- South elevation and partial east elevation, 2009

- Location within Connecticut
- Location: Waterbury, CT
- Coordinates: 41°33′24″N 73°2′28″W
- Built: 1904
- Architect: Griggs & Hunt
- Architectural style: Second Renaissance Revival, Beaux-Arts
- Part of: Downtown Waterbury Historic District (ID83001280)
- NRHP reference No.: 83001282

Significant dates
- Added to NRHP: June 30, 1983
- Designated CP: August 3, 1983

The Elton Hotel is located at 30 West Main Street in downtown Waterbury, Connecticut, United States. It is an early 20th-century building by local architects Griggs & Hunt in the Second Renaissance Revival architectural style.

It was built in 1904 to replace a lavish hotel lost in a fire that destroyed much of downtown Waterbury two years earlier. To the surprise of its investors, mainly prominent local businessmen, it turned a profit within a year of its opening. F. Scott Fitzgerald was a guest, and James Thurber is said to have written "The Secret Life of Walter Mitty", during a stay of his. On the eve of the 1960 election, John F. Kennedy gave an early-morning speech from the hotel that was credited with helping him win Connecticut. It continued to be used as a hotel until the early 1970s.

In the late 1970s, when the Downtown Waterbury Historic District was created, the hotel building was included as a contributing property. In 1983, it was listed on the National Register of Historic Places individually. Since then it has been converted into professional office space and senior housing.

== Building ==
The hotel is located on the north side of West Main, at the east corner with Prospect Street. It occupies a lot of a quarter-acre, about a thousand square feet (93 m^{2}). On the opposite corner is Immaculate Conception Church, a Baroque Revival Roman Catholic church built in the late 1920s. To the west, on the corner with North Main Street, is another, smaller office building of similar vintage. Across the street is Waterbury Green, the two-acre (8,100 m^{2}) downtown park at the center of the city. The surrounding neighborhood is similar high-density urban mixed-use development, with many other buildings dating to the same period and earlier, reflecting contemporary styles.

The building itself is a 100-foot (30.5 m) square six-story seven-bay steel frame structure surfaced in buff brick. It is topped with a flat roof. The south (front) facade projects slightly; within that the central five bays project as well.

=== Exterior ===
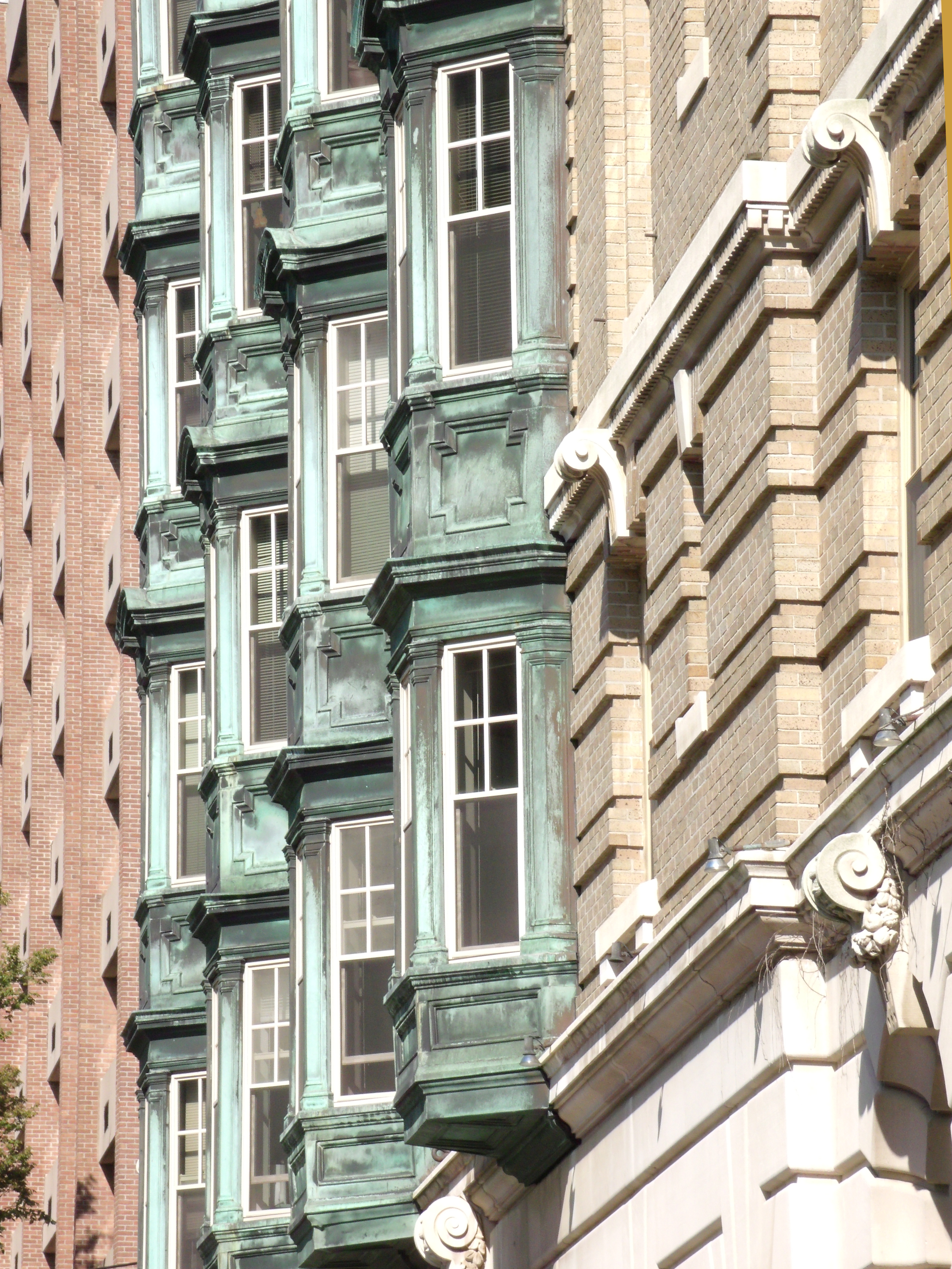
The copper-sheathed bay or oriel windows on the Elton's west façade; the red brick at left is an adjacent, more-recently erected building

On the first story the face is rusticated limestone. Round-arched openings, set with opening casement windows muntined in wooden ogee curves, have scroll keystones with carved acanthus leaves and floral festoons. Below them are small basement windows screened by curved bombe grilles. The main entrance is centrally located in a flat-roofed projecting portico.

A limestone stringcourse sets off the top of the story. The second-story windows have scrolled keystones as well, but over smaller, rectangular openings. They, and all the other window bays on the upper stories, are filled by eight-over-one sash windows, in the outer four bays and recessed French doors in the inner three, opening onto a balcony with wrought iron railing supported in the middle by the entrance portico and on the sides by large scrolled brackets. The brickwork echoes the rustication below and is further quoined at the corners.

Another limestone stringcourse divides the second and third stories. At this level copper-sheathed oriel windows fill the two bays flanking the center and continue for the next two stories. Quoins set them off as well, and the oriels are decorated with corner pilasters, recessed panels below the openings and classical cornices in a different motif on each level: a round pediment and dentils on the third story, straight with small mutules at the fourth, and large mutules and a cartouche on the fifth.

The other windows on the third and fourth stories are set within slightly recessed two-story rounded arches. They are topped with keystones supporting carved stone motifs above their lintels. Those on the third story have swags, with wreaths in the arch on the fourth.

Projecting bricks, interrupted by the quoins and oriels, set off the fifth story. The windows there have less decoration, primarily splayed-brick lintels similar to those on the two stories below but with a projecting keystone. At the top of the oriel is another balcony like the one on the second story, with scrolled brackets supporting it in the center as well. On the sixth floor French doors again open onto the balcony from recessed openings; the outer windows are the plainest on the facade, slightly recessed with a projecting brick surround, divided from each other by recessed panels.

At either upper corner of the panels begins the copper roofline treatment. More large scrolled brackets and mutules support projecting eaves create a cornice effect. Atop them is a pattern in which narrow niches alternate with large copper cartouches. Large stylized foot scrolls support a flagpole in the center.

The other side facing a street, the west facade looking out on Prospect Street, has a similar appearance. Its four projecting oriels go up an additional story. On the ground floor the central entrance is round arched, and the flanking windows are rectangular, done in stained glass with a heraldric motif on their upper section. The windows alternate between large major openings and smaller minor ones.

The north facade, the building's rear, is its plainest. It is done in red brick with segmental-arched windows having no additional ornament. The east facade, overlooking a narrow alley between the hotel and its lower neighbor, is midway between the north and south in terms of decoration. Here the building is U-shaped, with an airshaft opening in one bay. A copper railing with bulbed balustrade runs along the top of the first story; behind it is the skylight that once lit the dining room.

=== Interior ===
Ionic columns with an unusual pattern of alternating fluted and smooth drums support a frieze with alternating triglyph and paterae. Behind them similar pilasters form an arched deeply recessed porch. In the walls are marble niches with a floral carving on top. The porch's soffit has a large central panel outlined by a wreath of carved fruit and flowers. The doorway itself has sidelights and a transom below a dentilated broken pediment.

The interior has undergone some changes since its conversion into office space and then its current use as an assisted living facility. In the lobby, some original features, like the columns and cornice, have been painted and enclosed. The original marble floor and mantels remain, with the latter now in offices that have been created. Above the east one is a realist 1930s mural depicting Waterbury's industries.

To the west, the ballroom has had its barrel vaulted ceiling with egg and dart molded cornice mostly hidden by a modern ceiling. It can still be seen from a second floor doorway. It is off the west stairway, which retains its original pilasters, archway and plaster ceiling decoration. The east stairway likewise has its original paneled wainscoting. They and the elevator lead to upper floors where corridors with their original door surrounds lead to offices and rooms that have much of their original trim, including deep cornices, paneling and molded baseboards.

== History ==
By 1900 Waterbury had carved a niche for itself in American industry. With two of the country's major brassmakers headquartered there, it was "The Brass City". The buildings of downtown were primarily sophisticated Italianate structures that reflected the city's achievements and aspirations. In 1902, a fire burned a three-acre (1.2 ha) area on the east side of Waterbury Green, destroying 42 buildings in the process.

The city was stricken, but not devastated. The fire had created an opportunity to rebuild and redefine itself, and the money was there. Many of downtown Waterbury's major buildings, such as Cass Gilbert's municipal center, were erected in the years afterwards.

One of the burnt buildings that had mattered a great deal to the city's business community was the Scovill Hotel, the city's finest. To replace it, the Scovills and other families prominent in the brass and other industries pooled their money, a total of $300,000 ($11.2 million in contemporary dollars) to build a newer, more sophisticated hotel for visiting business travelers. It was named after J.S. Elton, founder of the Waterbury Brass Company, since he and his son had contributed the greatest portion.

Wilfred E. Griggs, a Waterbury native who had studied at Yale and Columbia, was given the commission. He had already designed two distinctive buildings in the city, the nearby Odd Fellows Hall, a rare use of the Venetian Gothic, and the offices of the Waterbury Clock Company. His design for the hotel featured an elegant exterior, in which many Second Renaissance Revival features like a flat roof, bracketed cornice and quoins were augmented by the classically inspired carved stone ornamentation like the flowers, fruits and festoons, and the smaller-scale elements like the ogee curves in the windows, decoration more common on Beaux-Arts structures of the era. It covered a modern interior that used some of the newest technologies, from its steel frame structural system to the elevators, electric lighting and telephones in every room.

The hotel's investors did not expect it to turn a profit, at least for a while, since their primary aim was to provide the city with a hotel equivalent to those found in larger cities, and they could absorb the loss. Nevertheless, it made money in its first year of operation. Its restaurants were popular and its ballroom became the site of all the city's most desirable social events. Almon C. Judd, the manager, made it the starting point for the "Ideal Tour", in which a convoy of motorists would depart from Waterbury to visit major resort hotels in northern New England, at sites like Crawford Notch, Sunapee Lake and Poland Spring.

Guests in the early 20th century would include F. Scott Fitzgerald, Rosalind Russell and Lefty Gomez. In the late 1930s, James Thurber lived in the area and frequently went into town with his wife to run errands. Those trips inspired his short story, "The Secret Life of Walter Mitty", later published in The New Yorker, widely reprinted and considered a classic of American literature.

In it, the title character and his wife visit Waterbury to run errands. Thurber describes Mitty as, having completed his errands, returning to a hotel lobby where they have agreed to meet. While sitting in a leather chair, he lapses into one of his daydreams about being a combat air pilot, until his wife returns. It is believed that the hotel described was the Elton.

On October 10, 1922 a group of 15 men, led by Dr. Anthony P. Vastola, met in the basement of the Elton and established Unico National, an Italian American service organization to engage in charitable works, support higher education, and perform patriotic deeds. The organization now has over 7,000 members in 140 local chapters in 19 states. A plaque commemorating the establishment of the organization is fixed to the front of the building.

At some point in the late 1950s the Elton was renamed the Roger Smith Hotel. At 3 a.m. on November 6, 1960, John F. Kennedy spoke to a crowd estimated to be at least 40,000 gathered on the Green from the hotel's balcony, the concluding stop of an election-eve motorcade up the Naugatuck Valley. It was one of his last speeches of that year's election. The size of the crowd, and the enthusiasm with which they greeted Kennedy both at the speech and when he attended Mass at Immaculate Conception in the morning, led state Democratic chairman John Moran Bailey to predict that the senator from Massachusetts would carry the state, then dominated by Republicans. Two days later, Connecticut voted by an even larger margin than he had predicted for Kennedy, the first time it had supported a Democrat since 1944.

Pierre Salinger would later call this the greatest night of the campaign. A commemorative plaque was later affixed to the railing. In 1980, Ronald Reagan spoke on the Green and alluded to Kennedy's speech as a way of identifying himself with Kennedy. By the time of Reagan's visit, the Elton was no longer a hotel and had been converted into offices. Today it is The Elton Residential Care, an assisted living facility.

== See also ==
- National Register of Historic Places listings in New Haven County, Connecticut
