= Webster School (Waterbury, Connecticut) =

- U.S. National Register of Historic Places
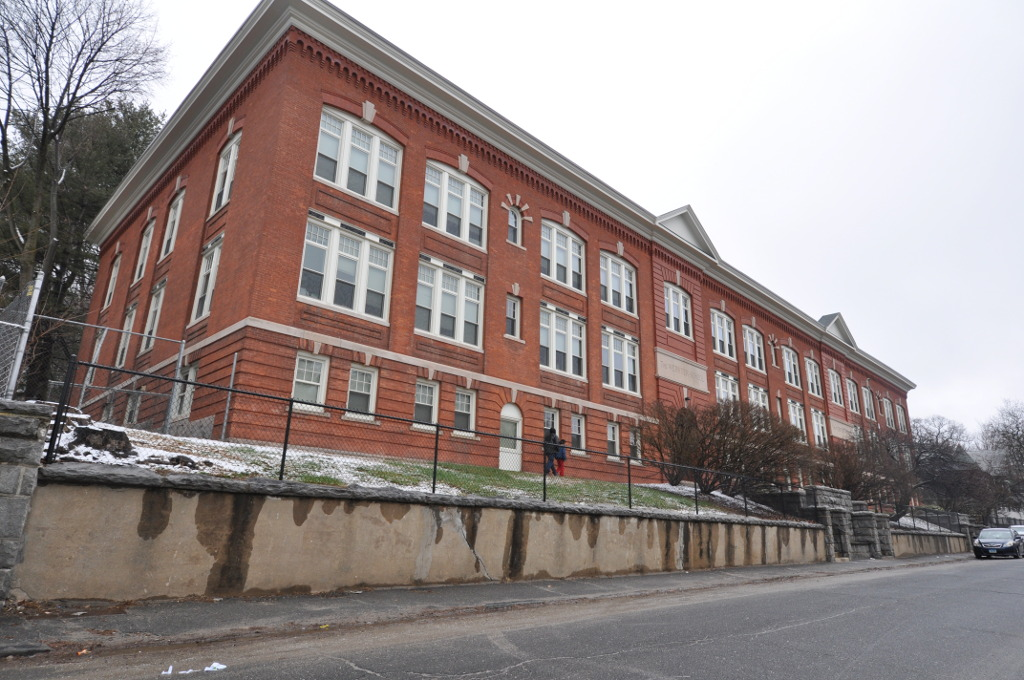

- Location within Connecticut Location within the United States
- Location: Easton Avenue at Aetna Street, Waterbury, Connecticut
- Coordinates: 41°34′0″N 73°01′53″W
- Area: 1.1 acres (0.45 ha)
- Built: 1898
- Built by: Asheim, Leonard
- Architect: Griggs, Wilfred E.
- Architectural style: Classical Revival
- NRHP reference No.: 82004365
- Added to NRHP: June 14, 1982

The Webster School is a historic former school buildings at Easton Avenue and Aetna Street in Waterbury, Connecticut. Built in 1898 to a design by the noted local architect Wilfred E. Griggs, it is a good example of Classical Revival architecture, and an emblem of the city's rapid growth at the turn of the 20th century. It was closed in 1977, and was listed on the National Register of Historic Places in 1982. The building has been converted into housing.

== Description and history ==
Waterbury's Webster School is located in a residential area north of the city's downtown, on 1.1 acres (0.45 ha) bounded on the west by Platt Street, the east by Easton Avenue, and the north by a spur of Aetna Street. It is an L-shaped 2 1/2-story masonry structure, built out of red brick with limestone trim. It is Romanesque in style with entrances set in round-topped openings, and windows set in groups in openings topped by segmented arches. An elaborate wooden cornice circles the building.

The school was built in 1898, during the height of Waterbury's growth at the turn of the 20th century. It was enlarged twice, in 1906 and 1917, to meet increased demand. It was designed by local architect Wilfred E. Griggs, best known for his commercial, industrial, and civic work, and the 1917 addition was designed by Louis Walsh, another local architect. The school marked a trend in the city of consolidation of a large number of district schools, and of the introduction of modern school construction techniques that emphasized fireproof construction, natural lighting for classrooms, and integrated heating and sanitation facilities. The school was closed in 1977, and has since been converted into senior housing.

== See also ==
- National Register of Historic Places listings in New Haven County, Connecticut
