= Downtown Waterbury Historic District =

Historic district in Connecticut, United States

- U.S. National Register of Historic Places
- U.S. Historic district
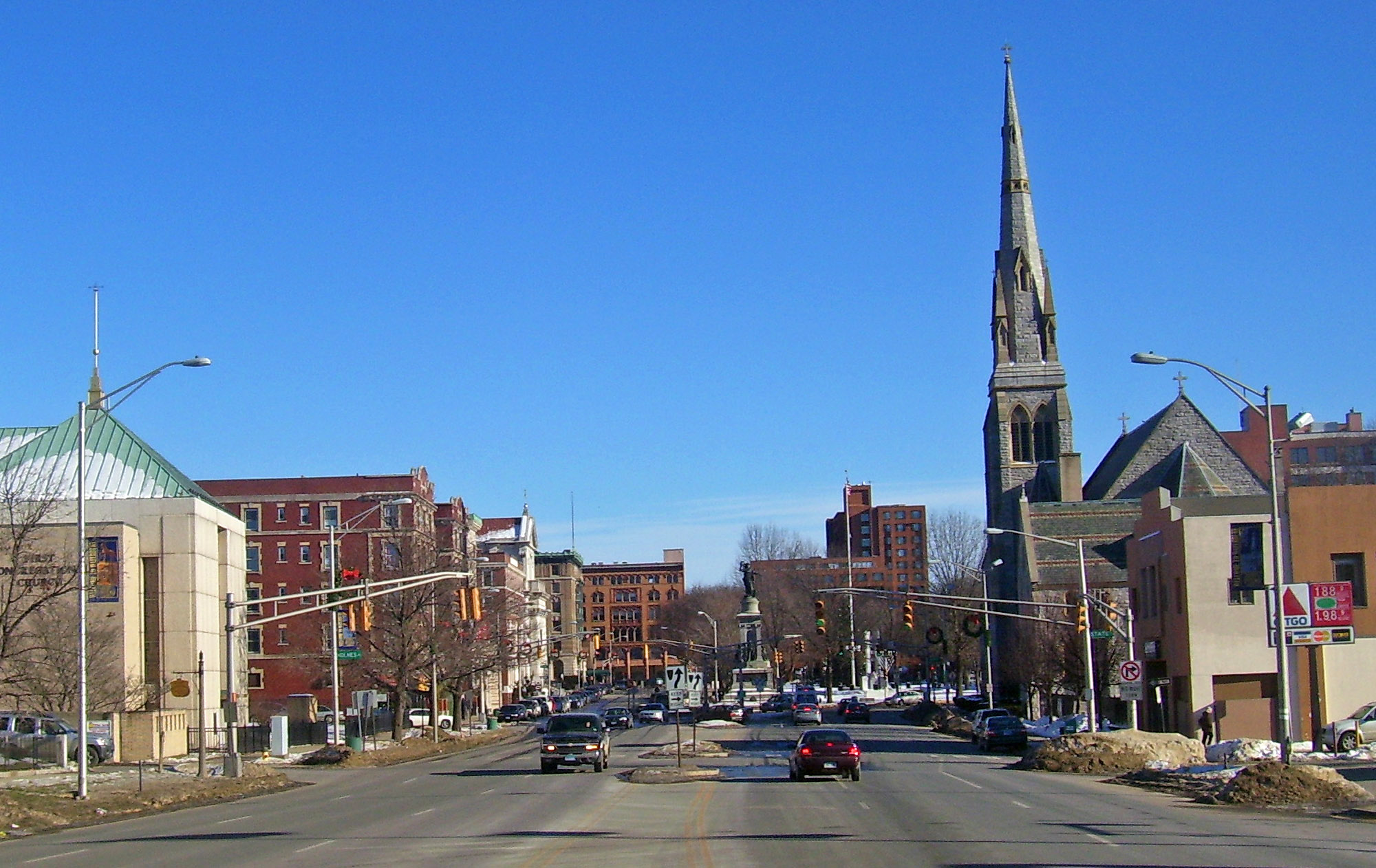
- View down West Main Street to Waterbury Green from Meadow Street, 2009

- Location within Connecticut Location within the United States
- Location: Waterbury, CT
- Coordinates: 41°33′24″N 73°2′33″W
- Area: 75 acres (30 ha)
- Built: Late 19th–Early 20th centuries
- Architect: Various
- Architectural style: Various contemporary styles
- NRHP reference No.: 83001280
- Added to NRHP: 1983

The Downtown Waterbury Historic District is the core of the city of Waterbury, Connecticut, United States. It is a roughly rectangular area centered on West Main Street and Waterbury Green, the remnant of the original town commons, which has been called "one of the most attractive downtown parks in New England."

The Green was the city's first center, with the buildings around it representing all types of uses, from residences to churches to public buildings. Many early buildings were cleared as the city grew and industrialized. Nearby Exchange Place, the junction of the city's streetcar lines, later emerged as a center for retailing. A devastating 1902 fire in that area led to more clearing and rebuilding. In its wake the city's government buildings were moved to a new municipal complex on Grand Street designed by Cass Gilbert, in accordance with the principles of the City Beautiful movement.

Most of its buildings, large commercial blocks, date to the peak years of the city's industrial prosperity, the late 19th and early 20th centuries. A few earlier buildings survived a devastating 1902 fire. Among them works by locally and nationally prominent architects, the latter group including Henry Bacon and Henry Dudley in addition to Gilbert. They include a variety of contemporary architectural styles, particularly the Second Renaissance Revival, Georgian Revival and Romanesque Revival modes.

In 1983 the area was recognized as a historic district and listed on the National Register of Historic Places. At that time, there were three listings on the Register within the district, including the municipal complex and a pair of houses listed together. Another old hotel has since been listed as well as a contributing property.

== Geography ==
The district is a 75-acre (30 ha) area between the railroad tracks along the Naugatuck River and the Waterbury branch campus of the University of Connecticut. It is an intensively developed urban area, with many multi-story mixed-use buildings. There are 130 in total, with six objects and one structure counted among the contributing resources. Seventeen of the buildings are considered non-contributing, either due to construction outside the period of significance or later alterations. The oldest date to the 1805s; there is some modern infill.

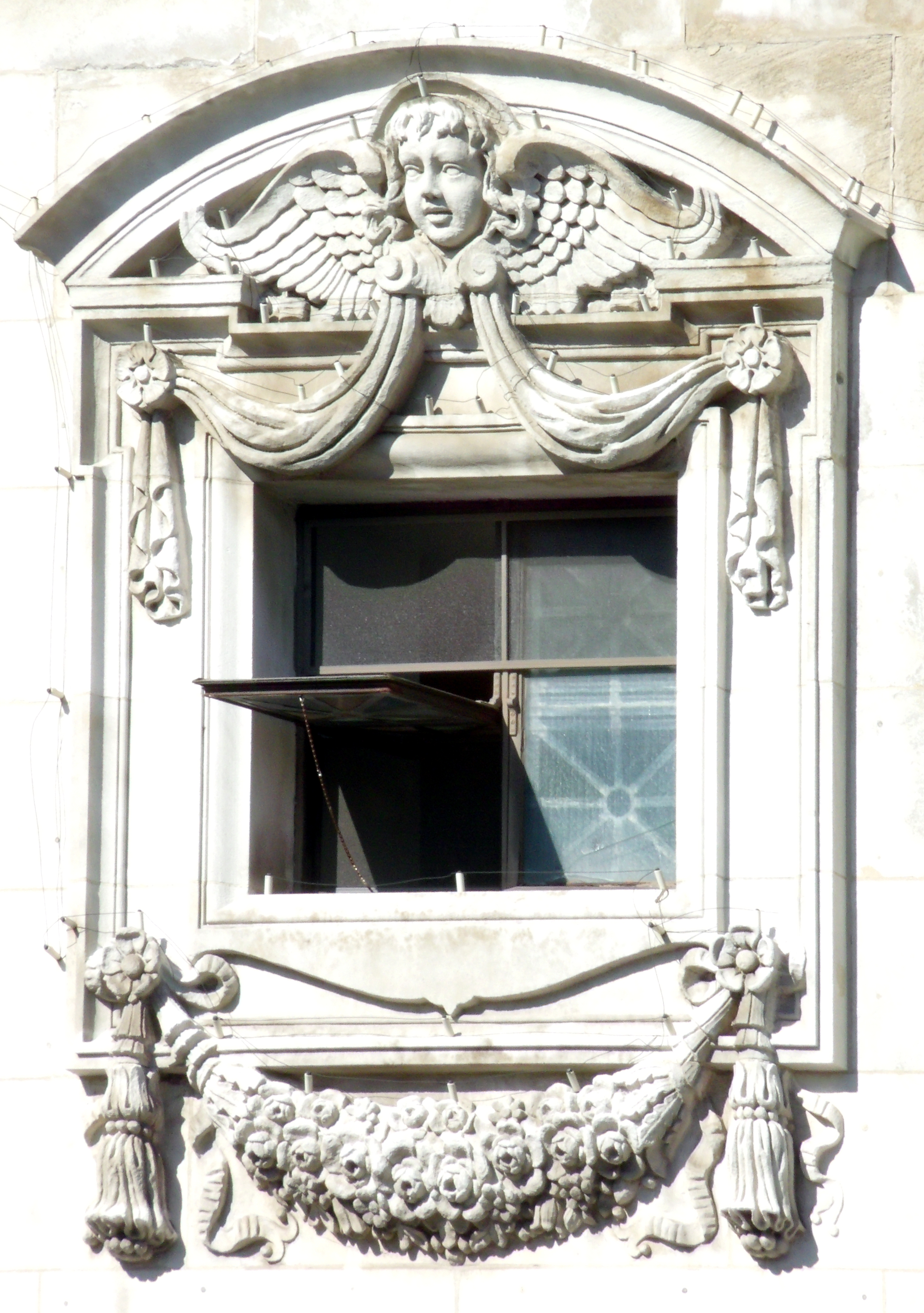
An ornate window on the south façade of Immaculate Conception church at the Waterbury Green

Among the buildings are large parking lots, and two small parks, Waterbury Green and Library Park, provide open space. The terrain is generally flat, the former flood plain of the river valley. To the south Interstate 84 crosses the city and valley on an elevated viaduct, affording a panoramic view of the skyline to eastbound traffic on the upper level.

The northwestern corner is the intersection of State and West Main streets. The district boundary follows the middle of West Main for two blocks to Park Place, where it turns north, excluding the Mattatuck Museum Arts and History Center and including Immaculate Conception Church and other properties on the north side of West Main. At North Main Street it turns south again, then east along East Main to the eastern corner of the district, the open square at the junction of that street and North and South Elm streets.

From there it follows a diagonal course along property lines, crossing Scovill and South Main streets to the junction of Bank and Grand streets. There it follows Grand westward, including the properties on the south side west of Cottage Place. It detours down Field Street in order to include the armory, then all of Library Park and the former American Brass Company headquarters. After following Meadow Street back to Grand, it follows State Street back to the northwest corner.

Leavenworth Street, in the middle of the district, divides the two major uses of the district. To its east are more commercial blocks, with buildings packed densely, covering most of their lots, centered on Exchange Place, the blocks between East Main, Leavenworth, Bank and Grand. West, the buildings are primarily institutional, dominated by the row of buildings forming part of the Waterbury Municipal Center Complex, with large setbacks from the street and each other. There are some commercial buildings among them, and one major institutional building, the post office, is located in the eastern half.

== History ==
Downtown Waterbury's history has four distinct eras, the same as the city as a whole: the period from settlement in the late 17th century to the beginning of industrialization, the industrial era of the rest of the century, the planned development after the 1902 fire, and the years of industrial decline since World War II.

=== 1677–1820: Pre-industrial era ===
From the time of its settlement in the 1670s, Waterbury had been a lightly populated agricultural community. Its growth was hampered in the early years by flood and plague, and later the difficulty of farming the land. Several decades after the Revolution, its population was not much larger than it had been a century earlier.

Industrialization began in the early 1820s, with makers of carriages, buttons and clocks attracted to the water power offered by the many streams draining into the Naugatuck in the area, the feature which had given the town its name. To serve them, some local businessmen went into the brassmaking business. They established mills of their own which drew on British expertise in the area to make the alloy in sheets, beginning the industry the city was to become known for.

The industrialists began to change the city. Their first suggestion to the community was the creation of a town green. On Independence Day in 1825, the townspeople gathered to blast some stubborn boulders from the swampy, neglected two-acre (8,000 m^{2}) remnant of the town common around which many of the original settlers had built their homes. In the following years the town drained and graded the area, realigned streets around it and moved the meeting house off the land. In 1842 it was fenced off, ending its use as pasture, and seven years later it was officially named Center Square, although the original name of Waterbury Green has prevailed over the years.

Few buildings remain anywhere in Waterbury from the city's early years, due to the extensive rebuilding that followed. The dearth, in a region where many communities have 18th- and sometimes 17th-century buildings extant, is such that the local historical society has printed a brochure explaining the lack of such structure in Waterbury to visitors, and the city's daily newspaper once ran a contest to find its oldest house. Within the district, the oldest structure is an 1835 Greek Revival building at 67–73 South Main Street. Its layout and dimensions remain intact; its exterior has been so extensively altered that it is not considered a contributing property despite its advanced age.

=== 1825–1902: Industrialization ===
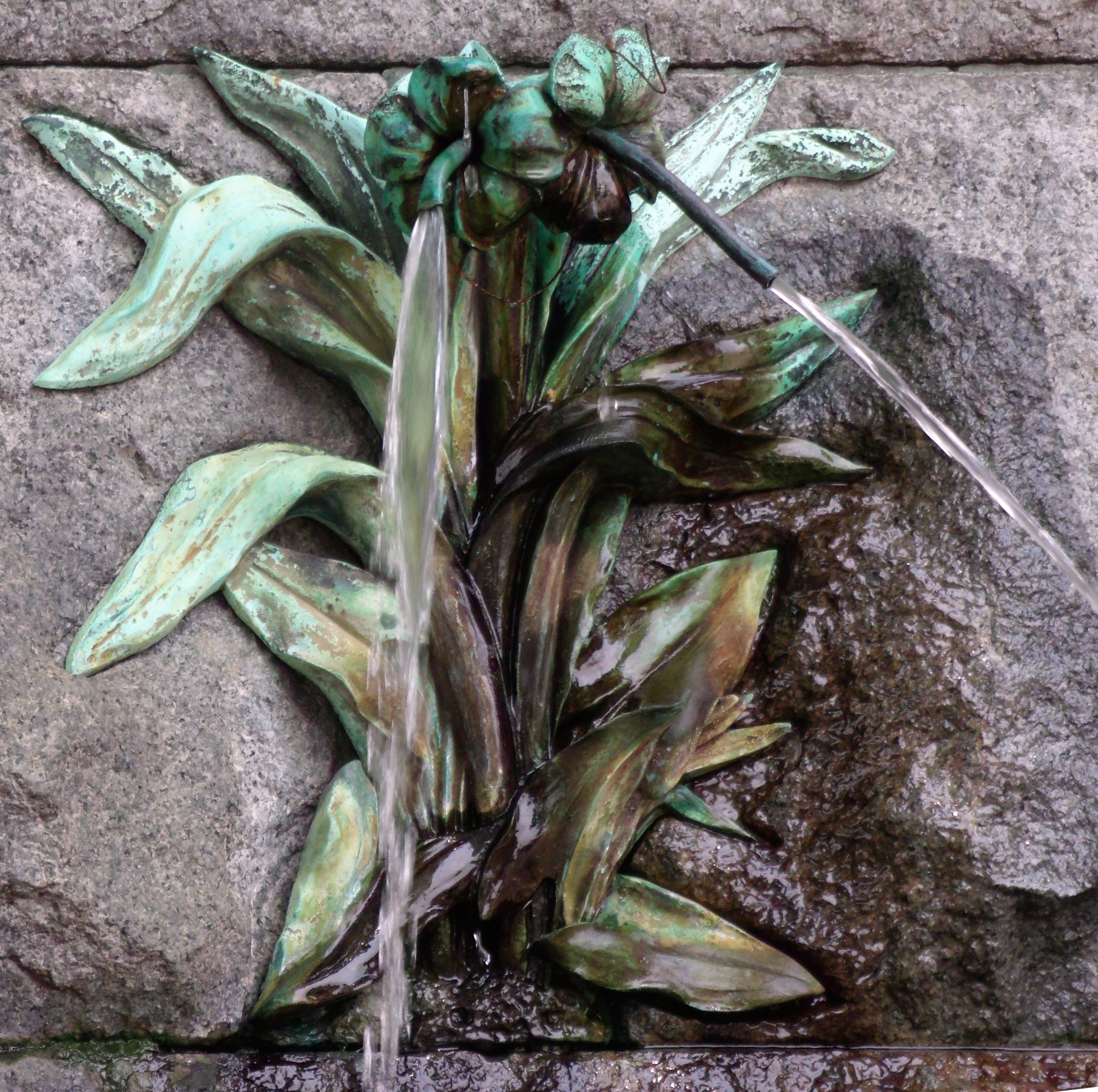
Detail of one of the side spouts of the Welton Fountain

Waterbury's growth continued to be steady but slow until it incorporated as a city in 1853. By 1860 its population had doubled to over 10,000. During this period Exchange Place, at the junction of the main east–west and north–south routes of the city, established itself as the central business hub of the city. The Greek Revival buildings on those blocks reflect that era.

Waterbury Green continued to develop, surrounded by a mix of public and private buildings, including City Hall, the library, and some private houses. The first monument, a flagpole, was added in 1851, joined by rectilinear dirt pathways later in the decade (themselves replaces with the current curved concrete paths in 1873). In 1884, to honor local veterans of the Civil War the Soldiers' Monument by George Edwin Bissell, was added. Four years later, the Welton Fountain, memorializing its donor's favorite horse, joined it at the opposite end of the park.

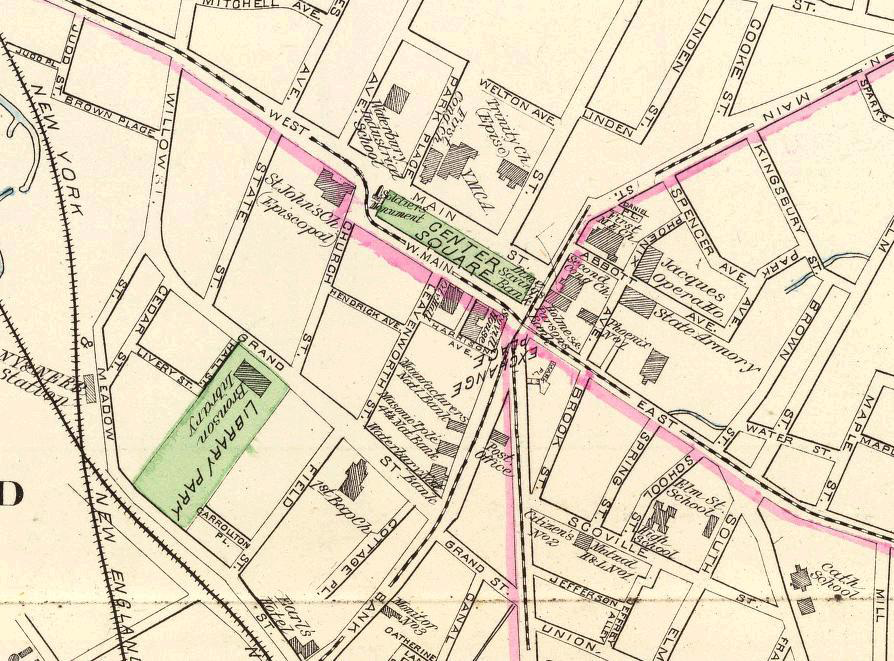
An 1893 map of downtown

Industry, at first located in that core, began moving to larger spaces further away from it as the city expanded and grew with them. Merchants moved into bigger buildings, such as the 1888 Romanesque Revival Platt Block and 1890 Queen Anne Hanlon Block on East Main Street. The 1894 Apothecaries' Hall, a seven-story flatiron-shaped building at Bank and South Main, has remained the focal point of Exchange Place ever since.

Local architects who would make their mark on the district began to do at this time. Wilfred E. Griggs' first building of note, the Odd Fellows Hall on North Main, with its rare American use of the Venetian Gothic mode, went up in 1893. It was the first of two buildings he would design for local chapters of international fraternal organizations, reflecting their growing role in the city's social and political life. The 1889 Richardsonian Romanesque St. Patrick's Hall on East Main marked the rise of Irish Americans, not only in its social-service function but in the person of its architect, Joseph A. Jackson, himself the son of an Irish immigrant builder.

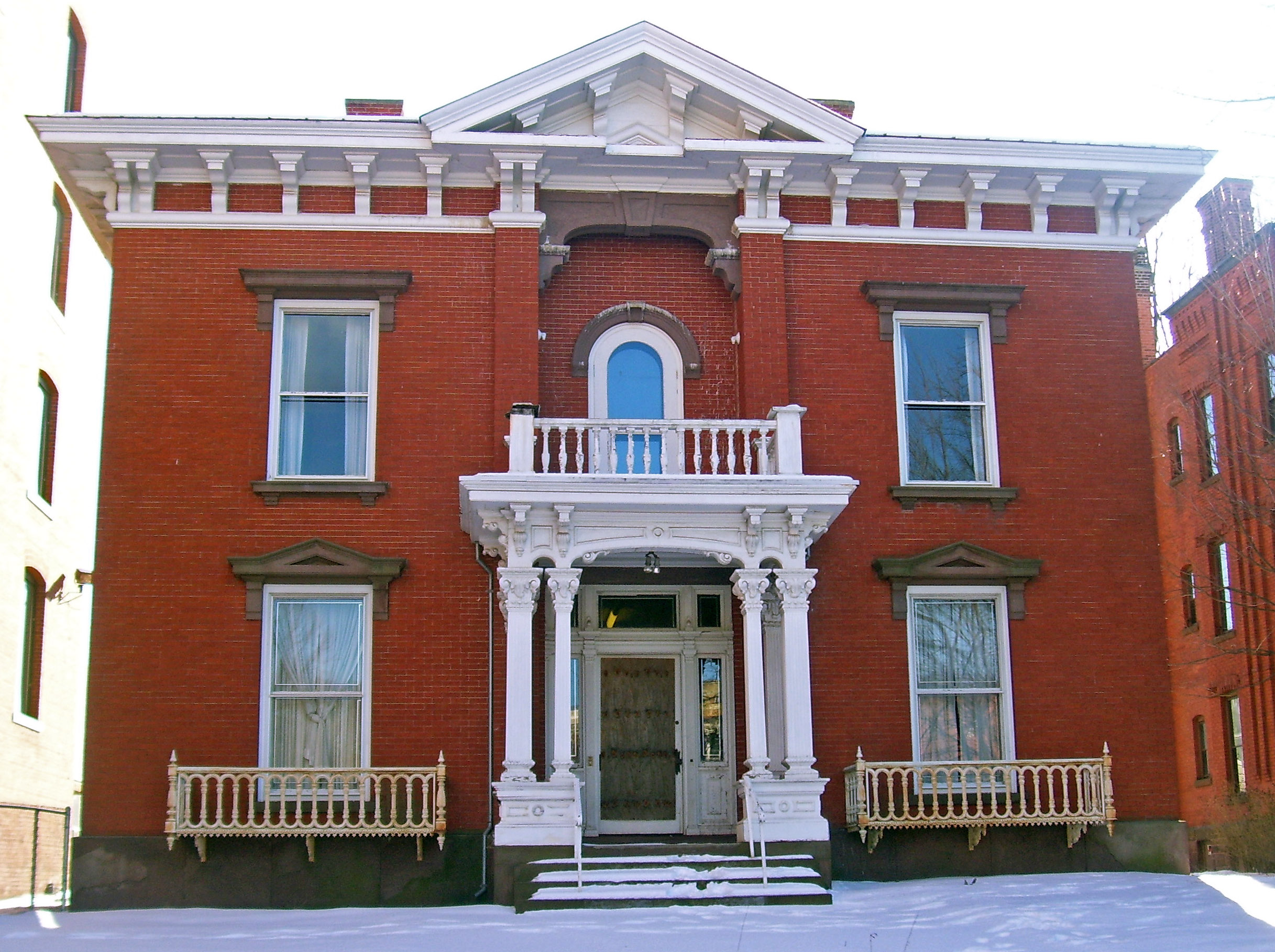
John Kendrick House

Wealthier residents built grand homes on West Main Street, like the John Kendrick House, as the expansion of the commercial district began pushing residential use out of that area. Houses of worship such as Henry C. Dudley's 1873 St. John's Episcopal Church, and Henry Congden's Trinity Episcopal Church, ten years later, followed them. In 1894, the Silas Bronson Library moved from the Green to its current location on Grand Street, the first such move of a major public building.

=== 1902–1945: Planning era ===
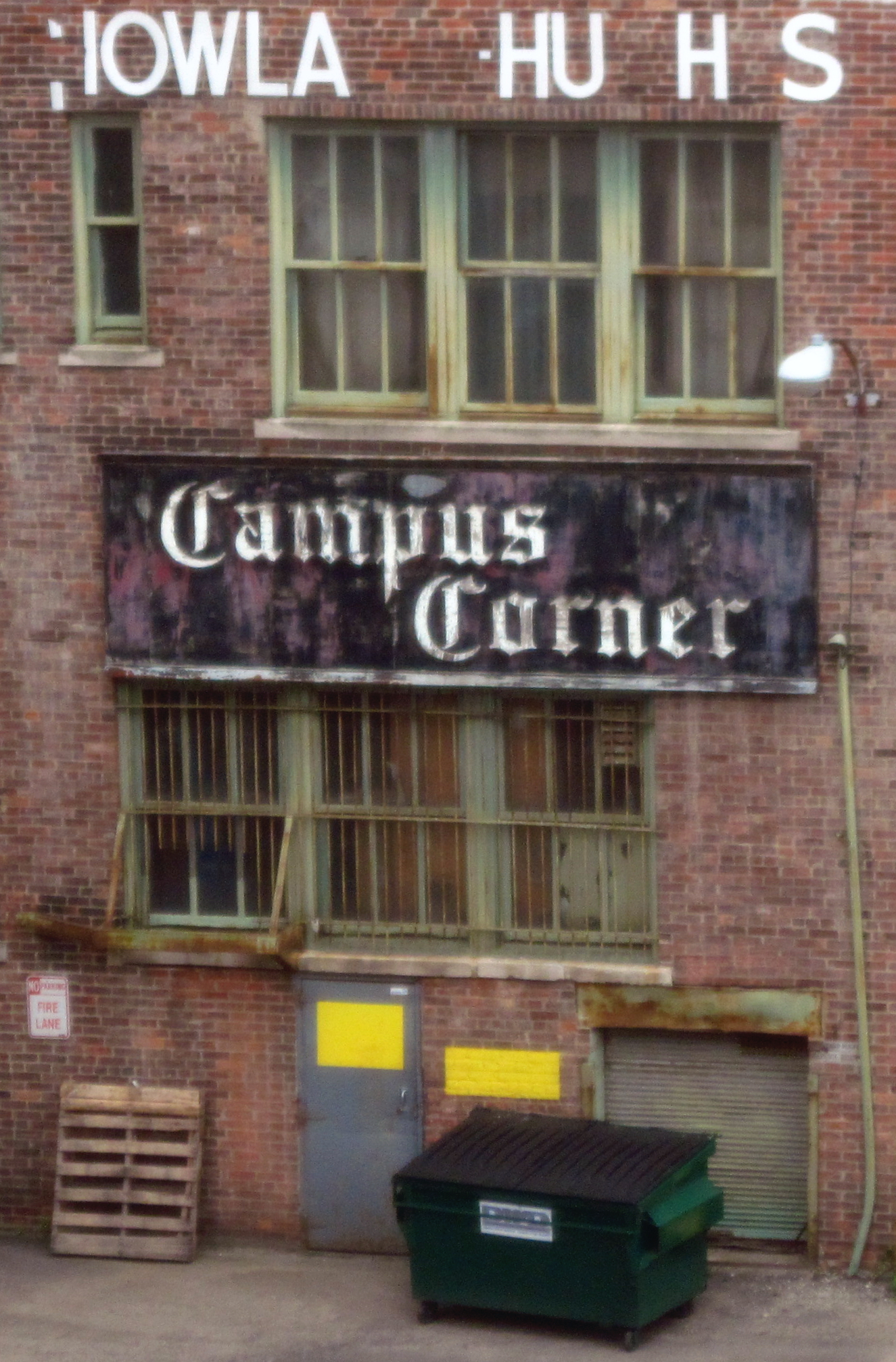
Howland Hughes building rear facade. Unlike the front of the building, the back had not been restored as of 2011.

By the turn of the century Waterbury was producing 48 percent of all American brass. The strength of the city's industries, many of whom were building newer and larger facilities anyway, left it in a good position to recover from the 1902 fire which destroyed 42 buildings on three acres (1.2 ha) downtown, many newer construction in the Italianate style, such as the surviving 1854 Reynolds Block on North Main. After the flames were extinguished, the city set about restoring itself, giving the future district many of its distinctive buildings. The first, the Second Renaissance Revival Howland Hughes department store building on Bank Street, was opened the following year, the first such enterprise in Waterbury; and architect Wilfred E. Griggs followed it with the similarly styled Elton Hotel on West Main across from the Green the next year and the Masonic Temple further down the street in 1912. Such large-scale buildings ensured downtown remained the city's economic center, at the cost of driving all remaining residential use out. Residential buildings that remained were converted to institutional use; large apartment blocks like the 1910 Jacobethan Hitchcock and Northrop, two buildings next to the Masonic temple that shared a common elevator tower, were also built on the periphery of downtown.

As it had when creating Waterbury Green, an early urban renewal program was undertaken to create the new Library Park at the intersection of Grand and Meadow streets. Old commercial buildings and tenements in the area were demolished, and the streets realigned and straightened to create an appropriate neighborhood for the new Waterbury Union Station, which opened in 1909. Although outside the district, its 240-foot (73 m) clock tower, modeled on the Torre del Mangia in Siena, Italy, has since become the city's distinguishing landmark owing to its dominance of the skyline.

Within the future district, American Brass, the city's largest employer, built its Renaissance Revival headquarters in 1913 at the Grand and Meadow corner, facing the station. It was complemented by the Georgian Revival Waterbury City Hall to the east designed by Cass Gilbert and completed in 1917, five years after the original building at Leavenworth and West Main was destroyed by an arsonist. Gilbert complemented it at the same time with the Chase Headquarters Building, for another one of the city's brassmakers. Other large buildings, mainly the headquarters of local banks, filled out Grand Street. These were all part of a conscious attempt, following the contemporary City Beautiful movement, to provide impressive vistas both approaching and leaving the commercial center at Exchange Place, now the hub of the city's trolley lines.

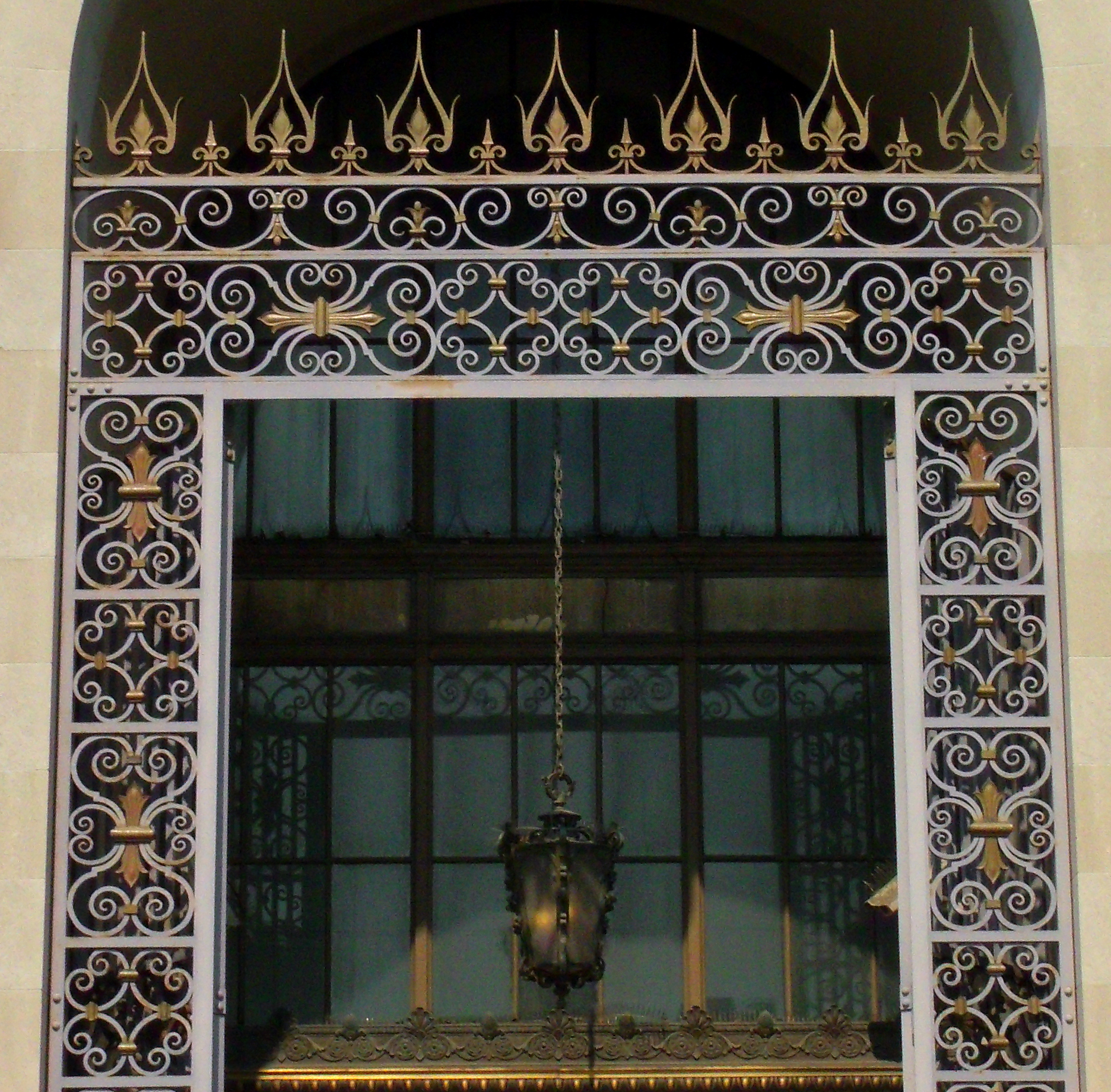
Detail of grillework at the east entrance of the Citizen's and Manufacturer's Bank entrance

During World War I the city's brass mills were in constant operation for military contracts, first from the Allies and later the federal government when the United States joined them. Afterward, the prosperity continued into the Roaring Twenties, introducing more significant new buildings to the city. Some were in styles that had already been used downtown, like the Georgian Revival YMCA building on West Main, Gilbert's 1921 Waterbury Savings Bank next to the municipal complex, and the Second Renaissance Revival Waterbury Savings Bank on North Main. Henry Bacon contributed the Citizen's and Manufacturer's Bank on Leavenworth Street in that style, in 1921, and the following year a third one, the Palace Theater on West Main, gave the city what was to be its premier theater for many years. The later years of the decade brought in newer styles like the Baroque Revival Immaculate Conception Church, a 1928 edifice reflecting the progress of Waterbury's Catholic immigrant communities.

The last significant architectural style downtown, the Art Deco and modernist buildings, came at the end of this period, just before the Great Depression put a halt to most new private construction. The most prominent examples of these styles in the district are the 1930 Brown Building at the corner of East and South Main, and the 1931 Art Deco post office on Grand Street. Further down the street the same year's Telephone Building, by Douglas Orr, uses modernistic brick detailing on a Georgian Revival design.

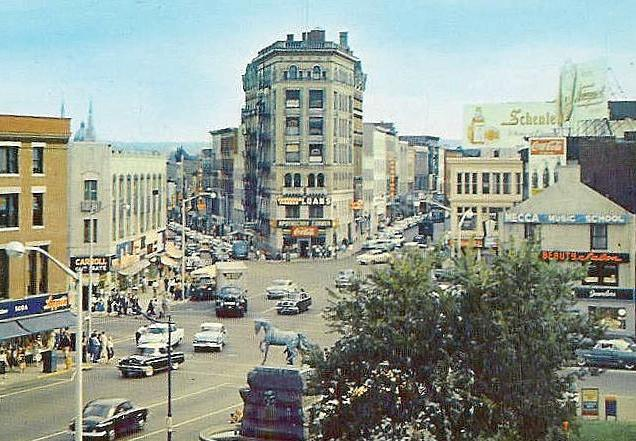
Exchange Place in mid-20th century

=== 1946–present: Decline and renewal ===
A decade later, prosperity returned as World War II drove the brass mills into round-the-clock production again. This time it did not continue after the war, as plastics began to displace brass in manufacturing. Downtown also suffered as returning veterans, who were honored with a new, star-shaped monument on the Green, sought to live in more suburban neighborhoods, with a single-family house and a yard, a living option that no longer existed in the center of the city. This created a demand for newer and bigger roads to accommodate the automobile traffic that came to the city from those suburbs, and buildings were demolished to build them.

The effect on the district was mixed. While the bus routes that replaced the trolley lines continued to meet at Exchange Place, urban renewal programs later in the 20th century eliminated some major properties, most notably the McKim, Mead and White Buckingham Block at the corner of Bank and Grand and the neighboring Democrat Building. At West Main and Bank, Baubee's Corner, a brick building inspired by Federal style rowhouses of the early 19th century, also met the wrecking ball. Other historic buildings, such as the 1908 Rietner Building on North Main, home to the city's Chamber of Commerce, were modernized to an extent that their historic character was lost.

Newer construction continued in the district, with the new UConn campus taking up much of the cleared land in the east, obliterating Spring and School streets in the process. A new Bronson Library was built in 1963, followed by a new state courthouse nine years later, in 1974. Downtown has remained the economic center of the city and its surrounding region of the Naugatuck Valley, with many local banks still clustering their offices around the Green.

In the early 2000s neglect of City Hall led to the city's own building department citing it as unsafe. In 2006 a $48 million bond issue for renovations was rejected by voters in a referendum. The next year the city's Board of Aldermen put together a $36 million plan for which no referendum was sought. The rebuilt building opened in early 2011.

== Significant contributing properties ==
At the time the district was listed on the Register, there were three properties within it that had previously been listed. Another one has been added since. In addition, there are many other contributing properties notable within the context of the district. Some have been nominated to the Register in the past, and may be listed themselves in the future.

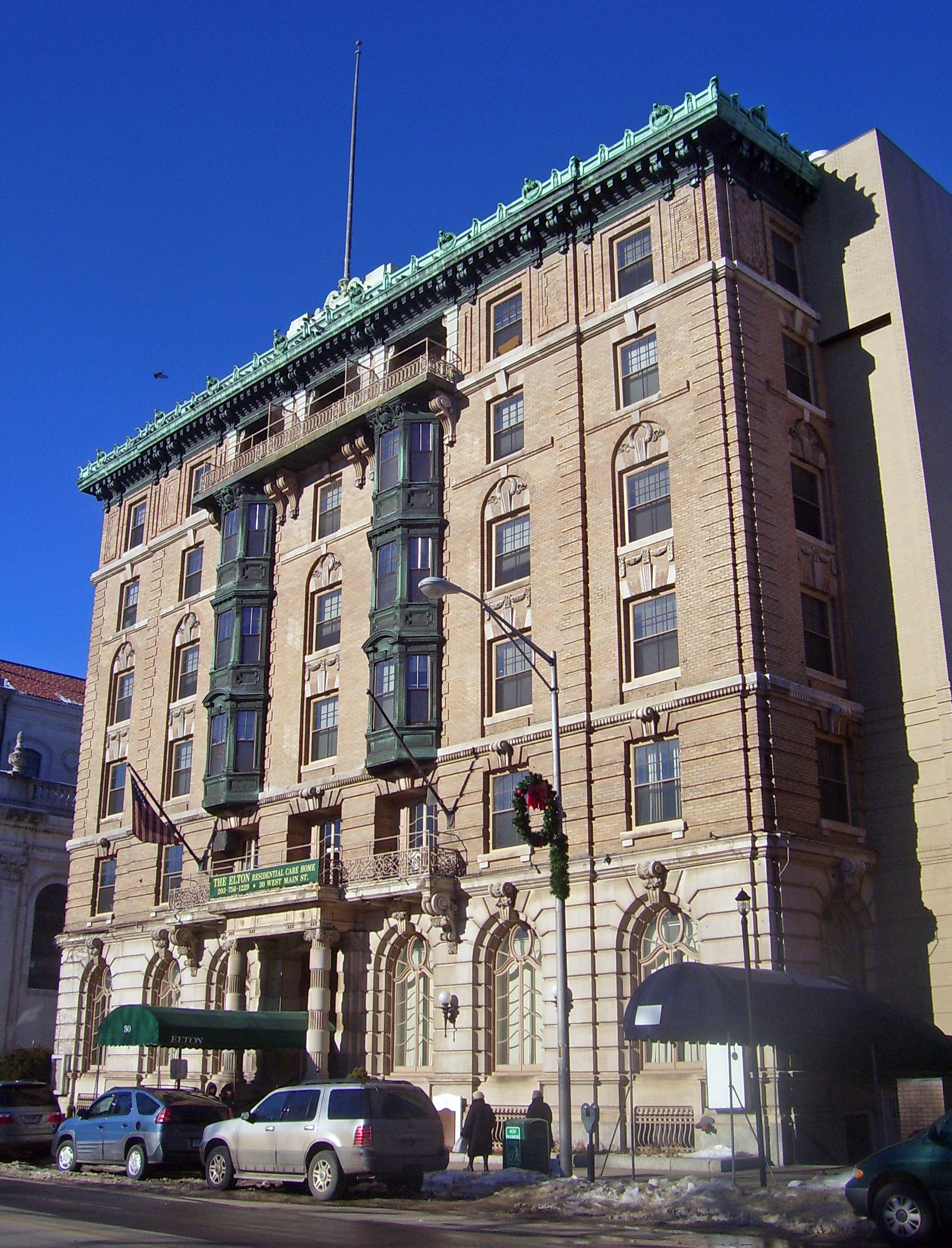
Elton Hotel

=== National Register of Historic Places ===
- Elton Hotel, 16–30 West Main Street. This six-story Second Renaissance Revival brick structure with limestone trim, designed by Wilfred E. Griggs, has dominated the Green ever since its construction in 1904. Today it is a senior living facility.
- Enoch Hubbard and George Granniss Houses, 33 and 41 Church Street. These two wood frame houses, in the Italianate and Stick styles respectively, date to the 1860s. They are among the few single-family residences remaining downtown, both since converted to commercial use.
- John Kendrick House, 119 West Main Street. The Mattatuck Museum operates this brick Italianate house on the Green, also built in the 1860s.
- Waterbury Municipal Center Complex, Grand and Field streets. Waterbury's City Hall is surrounded by other large buildings in the City Beautiful monumental style, not all of them originally public in function. Cass Gilbert's designs were built between 1914 and 1922.

=== Other notable contributing properties ===
- American Brass Company Building, 414–436 Meadow Street. The brick Second Renaissance Revival headquarters of the largest company in the city's most important industry was opened in 1913.
- Apothecaries' Hall, 63 Bank Street. Built in 1894 from a Second Renaissance Revival design by local architect Theodore B. Peck, this seven-story flatiron-shaped building has long been the focal point of Exchange Place. Recently remodeled into luxury apartments.
- Brown Building, 20 East Main Street. One of the last large commercial buildings erected during the district's period of significance, this three-story corner modernist structure from 1930 has intricate Art Deco detailing.
- Catholic Family Services, 56 Church Street. Dating to 1856, this wood frame Italianate house with fluted Tower of the Winds-style columns is one of the oldest residential buildings in the district. Like so many of the other houses, it has been adapted for institutional use.
- Citizens' National Bank, 18 Leavenworth Street. This stone 1922 Second Renaissance Revival structure was designed by Lincoln Memorial architect Henry Bacon. Its interior has since mostly been modernized.
- Benjamin Franklin Statue, Library Park. This 1918 bronze rendering of a seated Franklin by Paul Wayland Bartlett is the only contributing object in the district outside of Waterbury Green.
- The Grand Apartments, 180–182 Grand Street. Two 1910 joined four-story brick structures are the only Beaux-Arts buildings in the district.
- Hanlon Block, 181–187 East Main Street. This four-story brick structure, built around 1890, is one of the rare commercial uses of the Queen Anne Style.
- The Hitchcock and The Northrop, 164–184 West Main Street. Wilfred E. Griggs designed one of these two 1910 Jacobethan apartment buildings. The five-story brick structures, with yellow brick and limestone detailing, are joined by a common elevator tower.
- Howland-Hughes Company Building, 114–138 Bank Street. Griggs & Hunt built this five-story Second Renaissance Revival home to Waterbury's first true department store within a year of the 1902 fire. Today it is home to The Connecticut Store, which sells only items made in the state.
- Immaculate Conception Church, West Main Street. This 1928 limestone Baroque Revival Roman Catholic church was based on a 17th-century Roman basilica.
- Johnson Building, 111–115 Bank Street. A 4-story concrete structure from 1925, it is the only Late Gothic Revival building in the district. It has been slightly remodeled with a modern storefront.
- Masonic Temple, 160 West Main Street. The later of Wilfred E. Griggs' two buildings for a local chapter of an international fraternal organization is a four-story stone Second Renaissance Revival structure finished in 1912. It consists of two distinct sections joined at right angles along the corner of West Main and Park Place.
- New Haven County Courthouse Building, 15–17 Kendrick Street. This stone Second Renaissance Revival courthouse was another of the monumental public buildings envisioned for the Grand Street corridor. It has since been replaced with a newer building nearby, reflecting Connecticut's abolition of county government.
- Odd Fellows Hall, 36 North Main Street. This 1893 building for the fraternal organization marked their growing importance within the city. Local architect Wilfred E. Griggs made rare use of the Venetian Gothic mode in one of his earliest buildings.
- Palace Theatre, 86–110 East Main Street. For years after its 1922 opening, this Second Renaissance Revival building was the city's premier theater. Hotel rooms were also included.
- Palomba Building, 150 Bank Street. An 1845 Italianate commercial structure that is one of the few intact buildings from that era remaining. Originally built as a house, with modern storefronts attached.
- Platt Block, 43 East Main Street. A four-story stone brick building with limestone trim, it was one of the first large commercial buildings in the district when built in 1888.
- Reynolds Block, 26–28 North Main Street. Half of an otherwise intact 1854 Italianate building facing the Welton Fountain, it is typical of the buildings that characterized downtown Waterbury before the 1902 fire.
- Rose Building, 77–85 South Main Street. This modernist brick commercial building with the Art Deco letters spelling out "Rose" on the facade dates to approximately 1950, making it the district's youngest contributing property.
- St. John's Episcopal Church Complex, 16 Church Street. Henry Dudley's 1873 granite Gothic Revival church is complemented with an 1890 Romanesque center by local architect R.W. Hill and 1922 Richard Henry Dana stone Jacobethan parish house.
- St. Patrick's Hall, 112–118 East Main Street. Joseph A. Jackson, the son of an Irish immigrant builder, designed this 1889 brick Romanesque structure with a brownstone front facade. His credit as architect, and the building's use, marked the social arrival of Waterbury's Irish American community.
- Telephone Building, 348 Grand Street. On its 1930 brick Georgian Revival facade is Art Deco detailing and brickwork.
- Trinity Episcopal Church, 21 Prospect Street. The smallest church in the district is Henry Martyn Congdon's 1883 stone structure in the Early English Gothic Revival style. A parish house was added to the rear in 1900. This building was demolished in 2018.
- U.S. Post Office, Grand Street. The most significant modern public building in the district is this 1931 white marble Art Deco edifice. George Oakley Totten Jr., under Treasury Department Supervising Architect James Wetmore, was credited with the design.
- Waterbury Armory, Field Street. Its use of the Romanesque style in 1922 was one of the last in the district. It complements the adjacent public and private structures in the Gilbert municipal complex.
- Waterbury YMCA, 122–130 West Main Street. One of the last large Georgian Revival buildings in the city when it was erected in 1924.

=== Waterbury Green ===
The two-acre (8,000 m^{2}) park between North, East and West Main and Leavenworth streets, the symbolic center of the city, links Waterbury to its early years, as a renovated fragment of the original town common. Over the course of the 19th century it assumed its current configuration with curved concrete walkways. Since its creation it has been the venue for many public events such as troop musters during wartime, demonstrations against those wars and economic hardship during the Panic of 1893 and Great Depression, and speeches by John, Robert and Ted Kennedy.

It has four monuments, all but one of which are contributing objects to the district:

- The Soldiers' Monument, at the west end. George Edwin Bissell sculpted this bronze "Winged Victory" atop a 48-foot (15 m) granite base with smaller figures in its niches. It was installed in 1884 to honor and memorialize local veterans of the Civil War.
- Veterans' Monument, near the east end. The city commissioned this modernist 1958 monument to all local veterans. It is non-contributing.
- The Waterbury Clock, center. The head of the local Chamber of Commerce fought to have this tall granite Seth Thomas clock tower, commemorating another important local business, placed on the Green in 1915. It is still sometimes referred to as the Colley Clock, after him.
- Welton Fountain, east end. This 1888 Karl Gerhardt statue of donor Caroline Welton's favorite horse, "Knight", is atop a fountain.

== Preservation and redevelopment ==
Waterbury's zoning code recognizes the downtown area as its Central Business District (CBD). Its purpose is "to encourage intensive development of a diversity of land uses within the area." The only provision unique to it is that any residential use must have a side or rear setback of at least 15 feet (4.6 m). There are no special provisions for historic preservation.

In 1998 the city established an Information Technology Zone over a 42-block area including the historic district. The state spent $2.2 million installing fiber optic, and set aside money for incentives to encourage businesses to locate in the zone. These include tax abatements and financing for eligible businesses, those which use modern technology to conduct their business.

Private businesses, landowners, residents and city officials have also joined to create Main Street Waterbury. Its goal is "to increase the political, physical, and economic value of Downtown Waterbury [through cooperative efforts]." It promotes the cultural and business opportunities available downtown for residents and visitors alike.

== See also ==
- National Register of Historic Places listings in New Haven County, Connecticut
