= Watertown Center Historic District =

Historic district in Connecticut, United States

- U.S. National Register of Historic Places
- U.S. Historic district
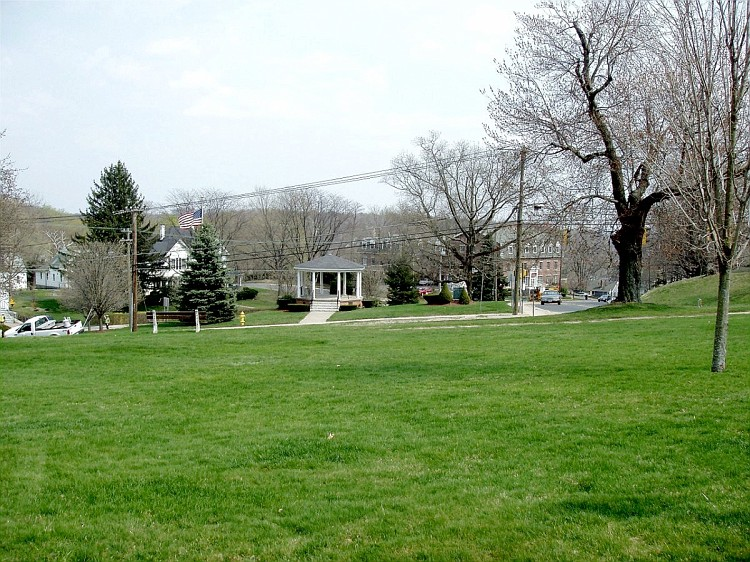
- Munson Memorial Park

- Location within Connecticut Location within the United States
- Location: Roughly along Deforest, Main, Woodruff, Woodbury, North and Warren Streets, Watertown, Connecticut
- Coordinates: 41°36′14″N 73°7′11″W
- Area: 45 acres (18 ha)
- Built: 1772
- Built by: Baldwin, Steven; et.al.
- Architectural style: Federal, Greek Revival, et.al.
- NRHP reference No.: 01000352
- Added to NRHP: April 12, 2001

The Watertown Center Historic District encompasses the historic village center of Watertown, Connecticut. It exhibits architectural and historic changes from the early 1700s into the 20th century. It is roughly bounded by Main, Warren, North, Woodbury, Woodruff, and Academy Hill Roads, and was listed on the National Register of Historic Places in 2001.

== Description and history ==
The area that is now Watertown was settled in the early 18th century, but was not incorporated as a separate town until 1780. Its town green, extending north–south between U.S. Route 6 and Woodbury Road, was laid out in 1772, and a colonial meetinghouse built at its edge (where the present town hall now stands), the area began to take shape as a village center. Steele Brooke, which flows east of the village, was developed as a modest industrial area in the 19th century, and the village was eventually populated with shops and several churches. The houses and institutional buildings built in the village before about 1930 represent an unusually high level of quality and diversity of style, and include a significant number of architect-designed buildings.

The historic district covers about 45 acres (18 ha), and is roughly centered on the town green and a stretch of US 6 between Woodbury Road and Main Street. At its eastern edge, Main Street, it abuts part of the town's modern central business district. Its southern boundary is Woodbury Road and Academy Hill Road, extending further south on Woodruff Road almost to Scott Avenue. It extends northward along Main and North Streets to include Warren Street. The green includes several small war memorials and a gazebo. The typical streetscape in the district is residential, with stylistically diverse buildings of high quality. Important non-residential buildings including the 1839 Greek Revival Congregational Church, and the Richardsonian Romanesque former library, built in 1883. The present town hall, built in 1894 in brick, is a fine example of Colonial Revival architecture. The United Methodist Church is an architect-designed Shingle Style structure built in 1898, and the Episcopal church is a fine example of an English country church designed by Allen & Collens of Boston, Massachusetts.

== See also ==
- National Register of Historic Places listings in Litchfield County, Connecticut
