= Waterbury Municipal Center Complex =

Historic government buildings in Connecticut, US

- U.S. National Register of Historic Places
- U.S. Historic district – Contributing property
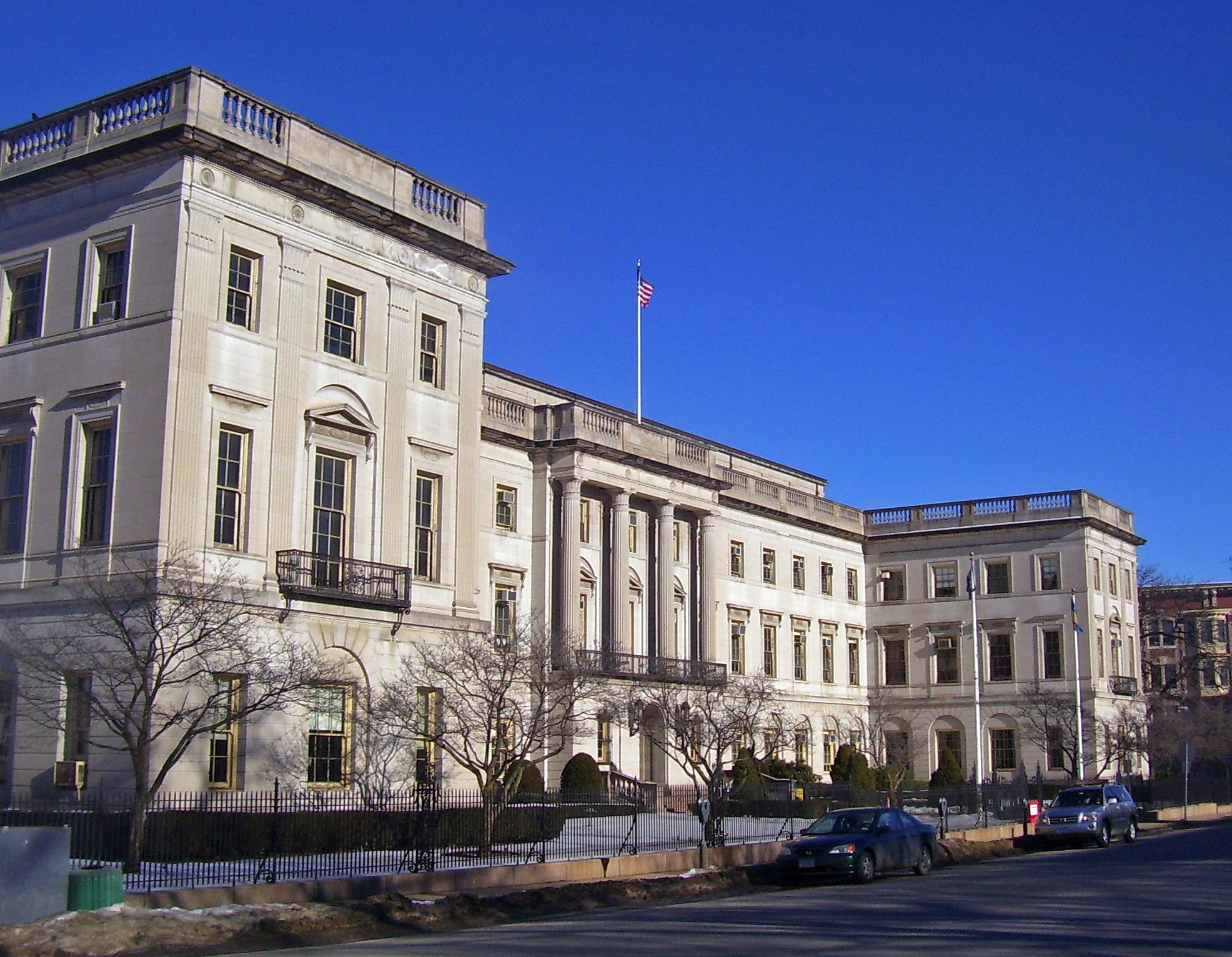
- South elevation, Chase Building, 2009

- Location within Connecticut Location within the United States
- Location: 195, 235, 236 Grand Street; 7, 35, 43 Field Street, Waterbury, Connecticut
- Coordinates: 41°33′15″N 73°2′36″W
- Area: 4.4 acres (1.8 ha).
- Architect: Cass Gilbert
- Architectural style: Second Renaissance Revival, Georgian Revival
- Part of: Downtown Waterbury Historic District
- NRHP reference No.: 78002882
- Added to NRHP: October 10, 1978

The Waterbury Municipal Center Complex, also known as the Cass Gilbert National Register District, is a group of five buildings, including City Hall, on Field and Grand streets in Waterbury, Connecticut, United States. They are large stone and brick structures, all designed by Cass Gilbert in the Georgian Revival and Second Renaissance Revival architectural styles, built during the 1910s. In 1978 they were designated as a historic district and listed on the National Register of Historic Places. They are now contributing properties to the Downtown Waterbury Historic District.

The complex was financed by the Chase family, owners of the Chase Brass Company, one of Waterbury's major industries at the time. In the wake of a 1902 fire that had destroyed a portion of downtown, the Chases and other local businessmen saw an opportunity for urban renewal. Cass Gilbert won the competition to design a new complex a few blocks from the old city hall building (since demolished) on West Main Street. Unusual for the time, the complex would house not just the mayor and city council but the public safety functions of city government such the police and fire departments, courts and jails. In keeping with the contemporary City Beautiful movement, the complex included other large-scaled buildings in its "court of honor", such as Chase's headquarters, a building named Lincoln House for the city's charitable organizations and a dispensary.

Similar architectural characteristics and motifs unite the buildings thematically. They have flat roofs, rusticated ground levels, and pilasters dividing bays in the middle stories. The two largest, City Hall and the Chase Building, have an opposite configuration. Many of the same decorative patterns are used on all the buildings. One in particular is the use of quotations from Abraham Lincoln. This is interesting since Lincoln never visited Waterbury nor had any particular connection with the city. It is possible that they reflect a renewed interest in Lincoln in the wake of the centenary of his birth or the 50th anniversary of his death, both recent occurrences at the time of the complex's construction.

The headquarters building and Lincoln House have since been converted to other uses, mainly private office space and additional city offices. City government continues to occupy City Hall. By the end of the 20th century the decline of the city's industries had led to the deterioration of the building, and it was condemned by the city's building department. A bond issue was later passed to raise money for its restoration.

== Buildings ==
The five buildings in the complex cover a 4.4-acre (1.8 ha) area of Grand and Field streets on the south edge of downtown Waterbury, just north of the Interstate 84 viaduct. City Hall and the Chase Building are on opposite sides of Grand between Church, Field and Leavenworth streets; the other four are on the east side of Field. Immediately adjacent are some other public buildings: a National Guard facility to the south; the city's post office and a federal court building on the east along the south side of Grand (across from a row of commercial buildings), a state courthouse and the Silas Bronson library and its park to the west.

=== City Hall ===
Located on the south side of Grand, City Hall has three sections. A large main block faces the street, with two projecting rear wings on the south housing the police and fire departments. They are connected by a rear section to form a courtyard. A garage has been added to the fire station since construction.

The main block is a three-story, 17-by-3-bay (203 feet (62 m) long by 46 feet (14 m) high) Georgian Revival structure, faced in marble on its first story and brick with marble trim on the upper two. Atop its flat roof is a small penthouse, from which a four-stage tower rises. It is set back 80 feet (24 m) from the street to allow for a fountain plaza Gilbert referred to as the entourage.

The entourage is a rectangular area, reached by steps from the street, with a paved oval at the center. In the middle of the oval is a round marble fountain within a round catch basin. Six carved light standards, each with two lamps, flank the steps leading from the street. On either side of the entourage are large flagpoles on bronze bases inside grass parterres bordered by small hedges. At the rear of the parterres are marble urns with fountains flanking the balustraded entrance steps.

==== Exterior ====
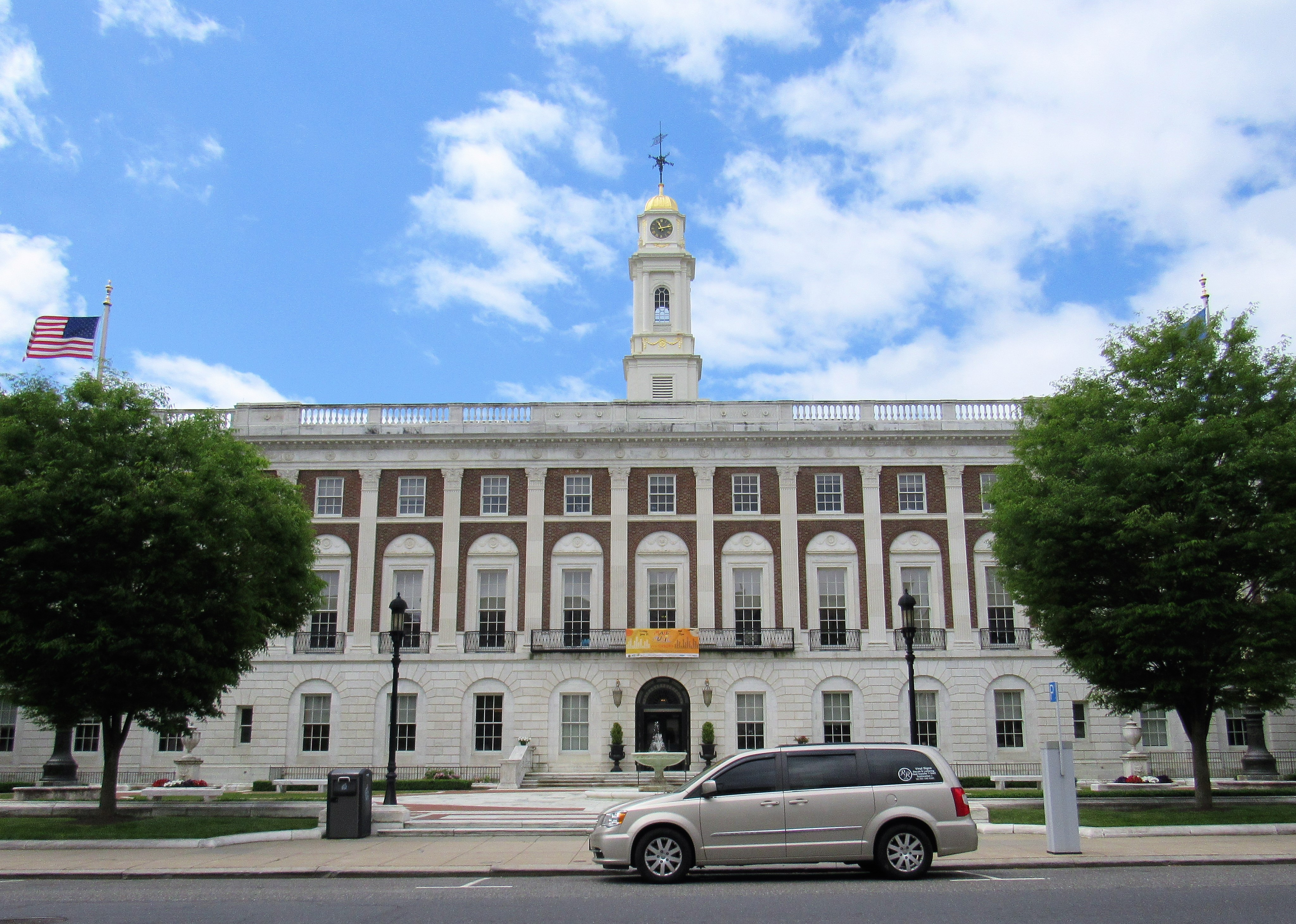
Waterbury City Hall

On the north (front) facade, the first-story marble is rusticated. Trabeated six-over-six double-hung sash windows are slightly recessed in arched surrounds. The corners are slightly recessed; the middle 11 bays project slightly to form a small pavilion.

Atop the first story of that pavilion is a blind paneled balustrade. Large fluted composite pilasters divide each bay, set with recessed nine-over-nine double-hung sash and projecting cornice caps in the pavilion and full round-arched windows on the ends. At the end of the pavilion are narrow sash windows with bronze grilles. The center bays of the end sets, and the pavilion bays, have bronze geometric balconies with center medallions.

A thin terra cotta belt course with gougework and geometric shapes sets off the third story. The pavilion has trabeated six-over-six sash flanked by blind bays at its end, and the end bays have circular bas-reliefs, depicting, from east to west, "Industry" as a workman amid gears and cogs, the city seal, "Commerce", as a figure of Mercury with a caduceus, "Force" as a Roman gladiator, and Justice. In the pilaster capitals are two designs, one of which features a prominent eagle.

The marble frieze below the roofline has a regular pattern of decorated discs with swags at the pavilion ends. Above it is a modillioned cornice with carved leaves and bead-and-reel moldings. They in turn support a broad balustrade. At the pavilion ends and above the three center bays are panels with vertical gougework in a wave pattern. The center is further decorated with the inscription Quid Aere Perennius, Latin for "more lasting than brass."

On the east and west sides are a central entrance with steps on either side. Above it is an arched tablet with an inscription: "Impartiality is the life of Justice as Justice is of all government. Justice is the constant desire and effort to render to every man his due" by the Roman emperor Justinian I on the west, and "Let us have faith that right makes might, and in that faith let us to the end dare to do our duty as we understand it" attributed to Abraham Lincoln on the east. The third story has a panel (further inscribed with "Reason is the Life of Law" on the west) between two circular bas-reliefs in carved leaf surrounds. On the east side they depict "Truth" as a woman contemplating a skull and "Prudence" as a woman gazing into a mirror; on the west are "Wisdom" as an aged man holding a lamp and "Order" as a female with a mace.

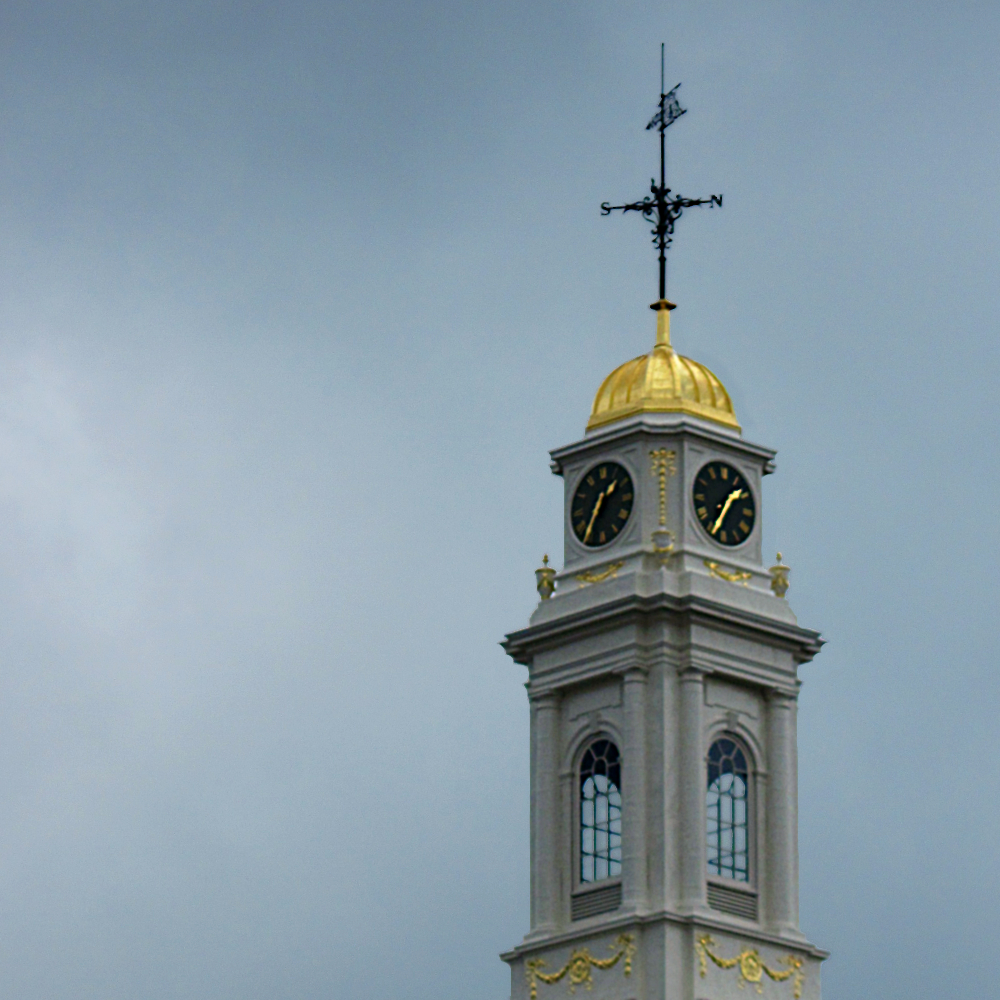
The cupola, clock tower and weathervane atop Waterbury City Hall

The tower's lowest stage has corner pilasters and louvered flat-topped openings in all four sides. Above it is a blind balustrade with corner posts and swags. Pilasters frame arched openings. Another blind balustrade, its corners topped with urns, has clocks in all four faces. The final stage is a bell-cast gilded roof with bronze weathervane.

On the east side, the fire station wing is a nine-by-eleven-bay two-story structure. Like the main block it is stone on the first and brick up top. Five of the six arched bays on the east side are used for fire engine garages, their double doors topped with radiating-sash fanlights. The seventh bay is a regular door, leading to offices. The two stories are separated by another blind balustrade. Above the arched second story windows, set with six-over-six trabeated sash, is a plain cornice and marble-topped parapet.

The police wing, on the east, is mostly identical. A rear wing houses the jail. It has eleven bays at street level, and the main entrance is in the center of the west facade. Its rear bays have trabeated openings with bronze grilles.

Inside the wall between the two wings is a courtyard. It has gardens and benches. Several of those latter are original Gilbert designs.

==== Interior ====
The center door is screened by a bronze grille. It has a full foliate surround and fan, radiating from a central cluster to end in anthemia. On the door itself are grilles of square panels with center medallions that alternate between round and square shapes and rosette bindings.

Behind it, there is a small vestibule. Bronze commemorative plaques on the sides honor local World War I veterans. A rear entry with sidelights topped by teardrops and an elliptical arch with fanlight, all of leaded glass, opens into the east-west central hallway.

The hallway is sided in Vermont marble with carved panels featuring a fleur de lis pattern at the base, supported on eagle brackets and divided by pilasters with oak and acorn capitals. To the west of the vestibule is a panel with gilded letters both serving as a building directory and dedication plaque. Entrances are set in arcaded surrounds with medallions; the stairway and vestibule arches have eagle keystones. Atop the wall is a frieze with a center lamp between griffins holding ribbons and garlands. The coffered ceiling is painted with triangles and rosettes. Round hanging bronze glazed lanterns with clustered bulbs provide light.

The front lobby is also lit from the rear by a six-over-six double-hung sash set with leaded and stained glass, opaque on the bottom but with a cartouche and swag on top. The stair climbs to a Palladian window, also with stained glass. It is decorated with swags and ribbons, corner cartouches and panels topped with eagles in the center and vases and foliation topped with a lit torch on the outer panels. A cartouche-enclosed oval at the top has the date "1915" carved within.

At the landing next to this window the stairs divide. They are girded by an iron balustrade with bronze railing. The stairwell is further balustraded with a stylized compass in the center and a wave beneath the rail.

In the second floor hallway, decoration is more restrained. It has marble floors, wainscoting, door and window surrounds and pilasters but the walls themselves are plaster. The pilasters are topped with Roman Doric capitals that support a decorated frieze and dentilled cornice. In the metopes are painted vases and medallions. The ceilings are plain.

The original mayor's office is directly opposite the top of the stairs. It has freestanding fluted Roman Doric columns in the entrance. Fluted wall pilasters and marble wainscoting supporting a full entablature and arched ceiling.

On either end of the hallway are city council chambers. The eastern one was originally built for that purpose; the western one was a courtroom. In the former, the aldermens' desks are within a semicircular balustrade outlined with paralleling benches for the public. The Roman Doric continues to be used. Fluted pilasters in that mode support a full entablature and modillioned cornice. On the ceiling are octagonal panels with rosettes at the center. From it hangs a bronze chandelier with two levels of electric candles. The wall sconces, corner lights and door clock are original. A 1934 map of Waterbury has been substituted for an original decoration behind the mayor's chair.

Due to the change in use, there is less original detail in the west chamber. The balustrade, wall clock and light fixtures are among those aspects that do. The ceiling, also original, has the same center rosettes as its eastern counterpart but with square panels on the outer portions.

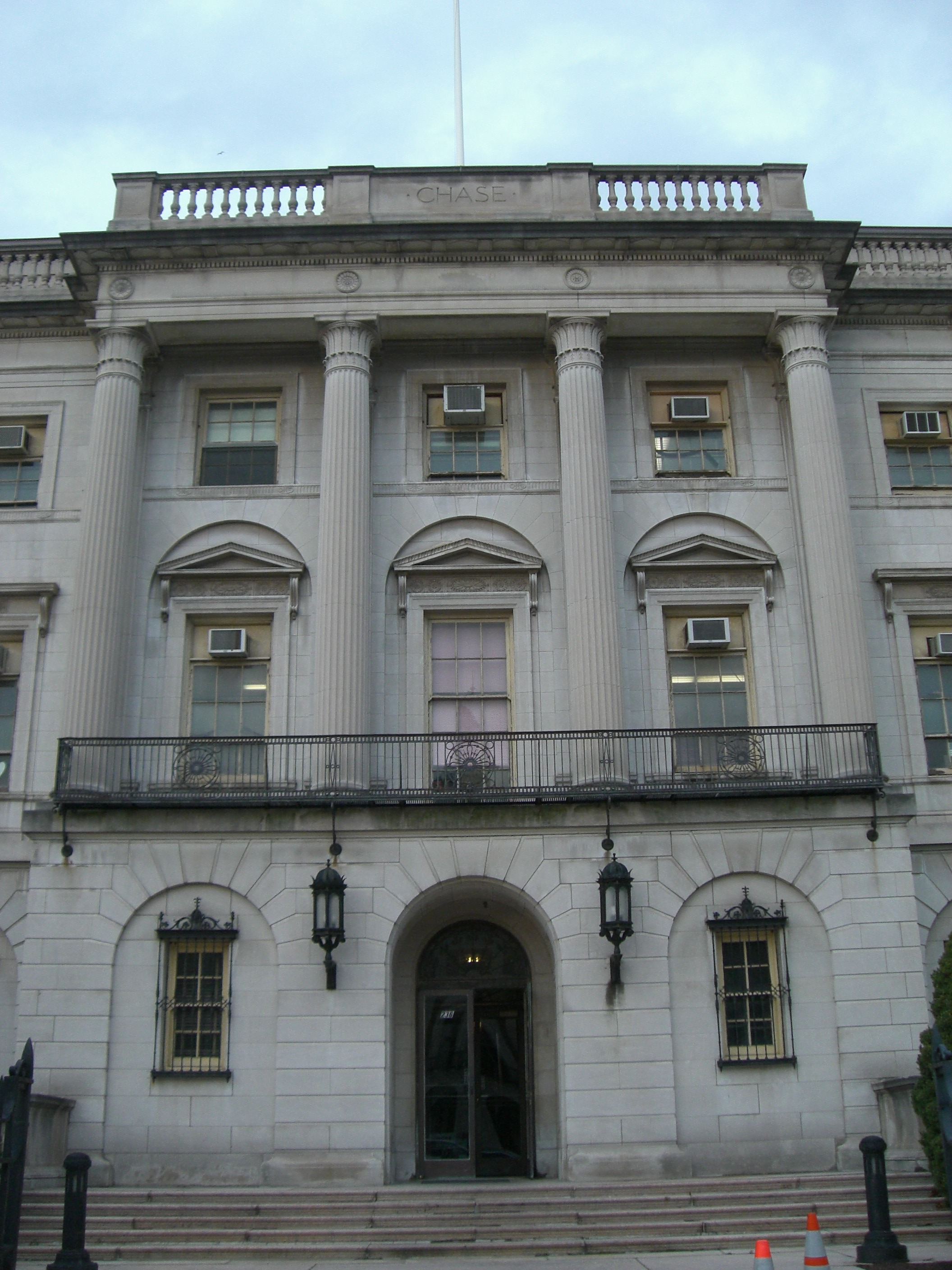
The central pavilion

=== Chase Headquarters Building ===
Facing city hall from the other side of the street, the Chase building's 21-bay south (front) facade is 243 feet (74 m) in length, making the Chase building wider than city hall which it complements by reversing the facade planes. An iron fence with small trees runs along the sidewalk; from it a walk leads up to balustraded steps at the main entrance. On either end two three-bay–wide wings project four bays to the street. In the central 15-bay section, the middle three bays project forward slightly.

The three-story building is faced entirely in Indiana limestone. The first story is, like City Hall's marble, rusticated, with the bays on the inside of the wings and the center pavilion made a series of segmented arches to give them an arcade appearance. On the east and west elevations only the interior bays are in arches. Within them are large six-over-six double-hung trabeated sash windows. Above them a cornice forms the base for fluted pilasters with Tower of the Winds capitals that divide the windows on the upper two stories.

The second story windows are also sash, set in rectangular openings with sills and cornice caps on consoles topped with rosettes or oval patera. The middle bays of the wings are six-over-six in a slightly recessed arch with pedimented lintel on consoles. They have a small balcony with iron guardrails. A stringcourse around the building sets off the third story and forms its window sills. The central section has six-over-six with a plain surround. On both second and third stories of the wings' south face they are flanked by narrower four-over-four sash.

The frieze below the roof cornice has rosettes or patera atop each pilaster. In the middle of the wings, and above the central pavilion, is a solid panel. That above the pavilion has "CHASE" carved in it. The north (rear) facade is less ornate but also well-delineated. A balustrade runs along the flat roof; there is a penthouse in the center.

Four fluted Tower of the Winds columns rise from the balcony level of the central pavilion. The windows they divide are identical to those in the middle bays of the wing end second stories, with the third stories likewise fenestrated with shorter six-over-six. Two bronze lanterns flank the main entrance, with grille-covered four-over-four sash in the outside bays.

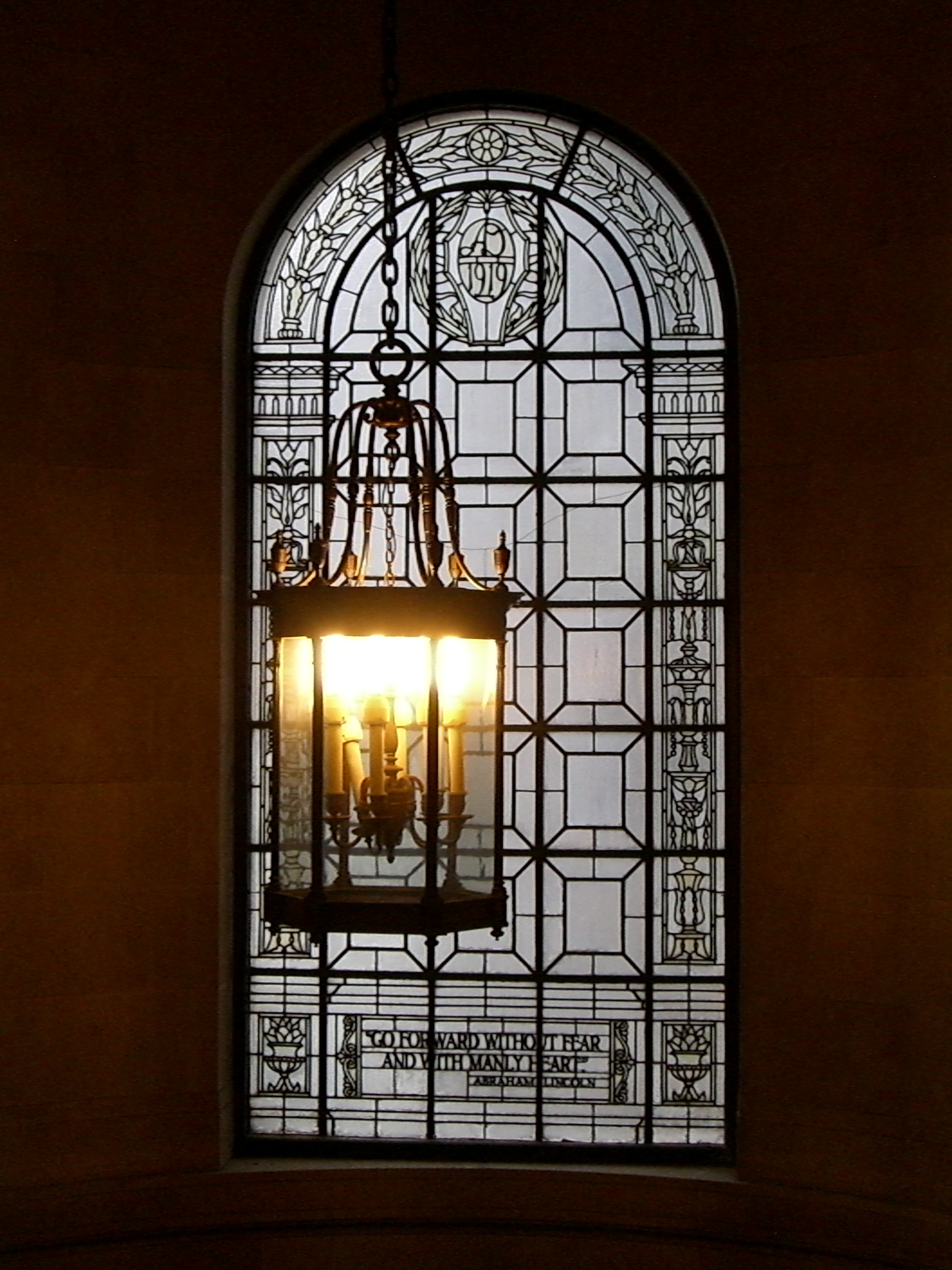
Chase Building landing window

The simple bronze door leads, as in City Hall, into a vestibule. Opposite it, across the central hallway, is the main staircase. At its landing is a multilevel stained glass window, with urns, foliate and architectural motifs flanking a central panel with another quotation from Lincoln: "Go forward without fear and with manly heart." Near the top is "A.D. 1919". Across from the top of the stair is the building's dedication plaque. An iron balustrade with bronze railings runs along the stairs, marble like all the building's flooring. The ceilings are enameled, and the door and window surrounds dark wood.

=== Waterbury National Bank building ===
The former Waterbury National Bank Building, now headquarters for Junior Achievement of Southwestern New England, is located on the southeast corner of Field and Grand. It is a four-story five-by-seven-bay structure faced, like the Chase Building on the far corner, in limestone. All four facades are finished; a cast-iron fence sets off the north and west facades from the sidewalks.

Both of those facades have an identical treatment, echoing the Chase Building and City Hall. Like them, the first story is finished in rusticated segmented arches. They are set with six-section rounded-arch windows, again creating an arcade effect. The windows' sections are a full window with flanking sidelights and three matching sections in the fan. Beneath them are wooden panels decorated with the same wave pattern used in City Hall's parapet panels.

The corners are emphasized with slight recess and pilasters. As with the other two buildings, pilasters, here with Corinthian capitals, spring from a stringcourse above the first story to divide the bays of the second and third stories, forming a balustrade. Six-over-six trabeated double-hung sash on the second floor are topped with cap cornices. Above them the third level windows are plainer and shorter trabeated six-over-six.

Above the third story is a full entablature with gouge work and medallions topped by a broad dentilled and modillioned cornice. The fourth-story windows are the same as the ones below. Above them is a slightly less broad dentilled cornice supporting a small parapet.

The entrance is a simple bronze door. It opens into the former bank lobby. Bronze cashiers railings with grilles atop marble counters lead to where the tellers' cages once stood. There are front and rear mezzanines. From the marble floor square columns with neck moldings rise to the coffered marble ceiling.

Iron stairs with bronze railings lead to the upper floors. Some of them have their original terrazzo floors. There are also original dark wood surrounds on some office doors, with a few having their original panels below and glazed panels of opaque glass in their upper sections and even transoms. At the first floor stair entry are the original bronze directory panel and mail chute.

==== Power House ====
An older building is joined to the bank building's southern elevation, between it and the Lincoln House. It is a two-story structure of brick, painted to match the limestone bank, in Flemish bond. Arched windows with stone keystones and impost blocks relate it to the other buildings in the area. It also has brick quoins and a flat roof.

It is likely the only remaining structure in the neighborhood that predates the construction of the buildings, built around 1900. Originally it was used as a power station. Gilbert, who hoped to make it part of a theater that would have been the complex's sixth building, called it the "Power House" on those plans. It was later renovated and annexed to the bank building.

=== Lincoln House ===
On the east side of Field Street, south of the bank building, is Lincoln House. It is a three-story five-bay square Georgian Revival structure of brick laid in Flemish bond with marble trim. A flat roof is pierced by a brick chimney near the center of the north side.

==== Exterior ====
The west (front) facade has a slightly exposed basement with revetted four-pane sash windows. Above a marble water table, all windows are trabeated, with marble surrounds. A stringcourse of header bricks laid vertically creates a springline for the round arches with keystones that enclose the second floor windows. Both they and the first-story windows are six-over-six double-hung sash; the third story has three-over-three. Above them is a narrow dentilled cornice and parapet capped with salt-glazed tile, the latter of which runs around the entire building.

All the other three facades are similarly treated. On the east (rear) the entrance is at ground level, and the windows are correspondingly dropped to provide better lighting at that level. The south side has a centrally located basement entry, matched by a smaller sash in the center of the north facade.

Marble steps lead up to the main entrance, in the middle of the west elevation. Its ornate surround has engaged columns on marble bases topped by a plain frieze and open pediment. Inside that pediment is the entrance fanlight, with a molded surround of its own topped by a keystone. The door itself has deep panels, six horizontal ones atop two vertical.

==== Interior ====
It opens into a small vestibule. Originally on the walls were marble plaques with more Lincoln quotes, including "With malice toward none, and with charity towards all ..." from his second inaugural address. At the end of the vestibule is a door with elliptical fanlight, leaded sidelights and Adamesque detailing.

Off to the right is an office and waiting room. It has another tribute to Lincoln, a shield-shaped marble plaque with the entire Gettysburg Address on it above a facsimile of Lincoln's signature. At the top is a bas-relief of Lincoln below an eagle in flight.

Behind the vestibule door is a central hallway. Wainscoting along the hall continues to the main staircase in the rear. On the left is the dining room, with the greatest amount of detail of any room in the building. It has a flat baseboard with similar chair rail and picture molding. The brick of the chimney breast projects into the room space, echoing the brick of the hearth below. Above it is a Federal style mantel where flat pilaster rise to a plain frieze topped by a molded shelf. The kitchen, in the rear, retains much of its original cabinetry.

At the rear of the hall the main staircase continues the wainscoting. Made of wood with round oak newel on a square base with neck molding and circular cap, it has a somewhat Victorian feel. It ends in a square room upstairs. Another stair, rising from the rear entrance, was designed to be used by those served by the charities housed in the building, and thus climbs to the third floor in short, gentle flights. It has exposed brick walls.

The main stairs end in a small, plain square room on the second floor. It leads into a wider version of the central hall, meant to serve as a waiting room. Off it are some bedrooms and examining rooms. The third story is all bedrooms, and the basement is equipped with showers and fumigating rooms.

=== Chase Memorial Dispensary ===
The Chase Memorial Dispensary is located immediately to the south of Lincoln House on Field Street. It was the last building of the complex constructed, after the space in Lincoln House allotted to the dispensary proved inadequate. Like Lincoln House, it is of brick in Flemish bond, five bays square, with marble accents and a flat roof. Exposed basement windows below the water table are, like its neighbor, four-pane sash, with those on the upper stories trabeated six-over-six double-hung sash, in round arches on the second story.

Unlike Lincoln House, the dispensary is only two stories in height. Atop the building is a narrow frieze created by vertically laid bricks and a marble cornice with Wall of Troy molded marble dentilling. The roofline has a marble balustrade instead of a parapet.

The side elevations are mostly similar in treatment. The north facade has four-over-four frosted glass in the second and fourth bays at both levels and the south has a large, two-level arched window in the center bay with two six-over-six windows. In the rear the balustrade has five solid marble panels. The chimney, brick capped with marble, rises from the roof just south of the northeast corner.

At the centrally located main entrance, the marble steps fan out, flanked by a cast-iron railing. It supports cast iron and frosted glass lamps on bronze standards. The doorway is recessed in a brick arch with marble keystone, carved with an oval chrysanthemum patera, and impost blocks paneled on the outer facings and autographed on the inner ones. Above the entry a marble panel reads "Henry Sabin Chase Memorial Dispensary".

The front and rear doors open into identical vestibules, with screened doors at the exterior and interior doors repeating the outside doors' fanlights, sidelights and surrounds. The door designs, six horizontal panels above two vertical ones, are similar to that on the neighboring Lincoln House. From the vestibules there is access to a large central room with coved ceiling. A main desk area is on the north with a dumbwaiter connecting it to a similar area on the second floor. The stair opening is to the south; examining rooms and offices are on the east and west.

The stair, flanked by an oak railing with square balusters, leads to the basement and the second floor. Upstairs, the layout is identical to the first floor except for offices in the vestibule spaces. Many sinks remain in the examining room along with cabinets and shelving. The original light fixtures, molded milk glass globes hanging from brass chains, also remain although some were damaged by plaster falling from the ceiling.

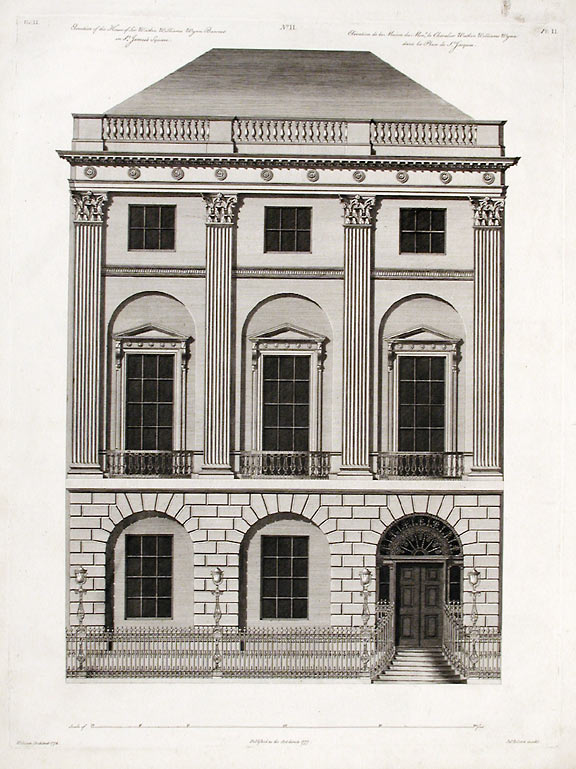
The Williams–Wynn house Gilbert used as a model

== Aesthetics ==
Gilbert took as his main inspiration for City Hall the house designed in 1772 by Robert Adam for Sir Watkin Williams-Wynn at 20 St. James Square in London. "I have been studying a number of English examples of the Georgian period", he wrote to a friend, "and find so many in which the material was all brick or stone that I am justified in quoting this one as typical." He had wanted the facing to be entirely marble as well, but the city insisted on brick and stone, an alternation which Gilbert had felt would be disharmonious given the narrow window spaces. Adam's work also inspired the coffered ceilings inside. The central stair was a tribute to the one at New York City Hall, which Gilbert had used as an example of why the face would look better with stone exclusively.

Chase had originally approved a brick-and-stone concept for the company headquarters across the street, but then thought better of it. "...[I]t would seem a presumptuous attempt on the part of private citizens to imitate and share the dignity of city hall", Chase wrote Gilbert. "The position we hold in the community is such that we dislike very much having this impression exist." For the same reason the brothers vetoed the use of a marble facade. The architect and the brothers then toured Manhattan looking for other ideas, and left it to Gilbert to come up with his ultimate solution, limestone deployed in a more Renaissance Revival style. He in turn persuaded the Chases to accept the wrought iron fence out front, using the J.P. Morgan Library in Manhattan as an example of how that element could be successful.

The addition of the bank building to the complex allowed Gilbert to use the three buildings to frame the view of the clock tower for westbound traffic on Grand Street. The entourage of City Hall and corresponding setback of the Chase Building allow the tower to dominate a wide open area. When traveling the opposite direction, the large buildings emphasize the parks around them, with glimpses of the denser city beyond the spaces.

Like the City Hall and Lincoln House, the Chase Building prominently features, among its architectural decorations, quotations from Abraham Lincoln. It is not known why this is so, as Lincoln had no connections to Waterbury. It is possible that renewals of interest in Lincoln in either 1909, the centenary of his birth, or 1915, the 50th anniversary of his death, may have led to this.

Gilbert had apparently added "Quid Aere Perennius", the Horace quote on his own, perhaps as a joke. It now serves as the city's motto. Gilbert had also designed a flag for Waterbury, but the city's aldermen rejected it in favor of a design featuring the city seal.

The city hall is frequently included in listings of Gilbert's major buildings, and he wished to remembered for it. It was used as a model for a new city hall in Lexington, Kentucky, and possibly that in Mount Vernon, Ohio, as well. Paul Wayland Bartlett, the sculptor whom at one point Gilbert had considered asking to contribute work to the building, called it "one of the most beautiful buildings in the United States."

== History ==
The complex took several years to conceive and a decade to build. It has continued to play a role in the city's history since then.

=== 1902–1912: Renewal and concept ===
In 1902 a fire burned three acres (1.2 ha) of downtown Waterbury west of Waterbury Green. The city, at the height of the industrial prosperity its brassmakers had led, was easily able to rebuild. Eminent citizens of the city had also seen in the process the opportunity to rethink and reshape the city's downtown, as their counterparts had done six decades earlier when they had created the Green out of a swampy remnant of the original town common.

The first part of the process was the construction of a new train station, for which the streets and blocks near it were cleared and realigned to allow the creation of a small park. Architects McKim, Mead and White gave the New York, New Haven and Hartford Railroad a significant Second Renaissance Revival building, capped by a 240-foot (73 m) clock tower based on the Torre del Mangia that has since become a symbol of the city. After three years of construction, it was completed and opened in 1909.

Henry and Frederick Chase, brothers who owned the eponymous brass company, not only the largest in the city but the country, along with the world's largest clock factory, saw how the clock tower created a new focal point along Grand Street. They felt that the street should now be the main route into downtown, worthy of its name, and developed a 20-year plan to remake it. In line with the principles of the contemporary City Beautiful movement, they felt it should be the location of a "court of honor" of newer, grander city hall, and other important public and private buildings.

=== 1912–1924: Construction ===
The Chases committed $100,000 of their own money ($3.18 million in contemporary dollars) to the project, primarily spent on design work while the city committed $30,000 ($1,075,000 in contemporary dollars), spent on salaries. At the time the economy was still recovering from the Panic of 1907, so the private funding was crucial.

First, the Chases sought to renovate Library Park, on the southeast corner of Grand and Meadow. They hired Frederick Law Olmsted's firm for this. In 1912 Waterbury's existing, smaller City Hall, on West Main Street opposite the Green, was burned down by an arsonist. This provided an opportunity to move the city's government to the Grand Street blocks the Chases wanted to serve as an entry to the city. Cass Gilbert, who had moved to Ridgefield a few years earlier, won a competition to design City Hall as the first of a complex of buildings that would highlight the public and private heights of the city. He may have been the favorite because the members of the city's building commission had apparently been impressed by his Ives Memorial Library, the main building of the New Haven Free Public Library.

It is not certain whether Gilbert was the Chases' first choice for the project. The three did establish a productive relationship, and Gilbert quickly laid out a park for the small block opposite the train station and designed a fountain for it as well. Construction began on City Hall in 1912, shortly after the old building had burned, when the Grand Street site narrowly won in a referendum. Three years later it was opened, in a dedication ceremony presided over by Governor Marcus H. Holcomb. In 1917, the entourage that Gilbert had envisioned as ceremonial space was the gathering place for men signing up for the draft upon U.S. entry into World War I. Two years later it served as the reviewing stand for the parade held when troops returned.

The privations caused by the Panic of 1907 had made clear the city's need for a single facility from which all its charities could operate. After studying such facilities in other Northeastern cities, the Associated Charities made recommendations to Gilbert in 1915. His design for Lincoln House was the only one significantly altered prior to construction. The original design called for a full frieze, wooden dentilled cornice and balustrade of brick and wood around the rooftop. Lincoln House was finished in 1916. Since most medical supplies at that time were geared to war production needs, it remained largely unoccupied until 1917. In 1921 Associated Charities, as much to avoid the stigma of its name that discouraged those it was meant to serve from seeking help from it as to reflect that it had become known by the name of the building, changed its name to the Lincoln House Association.

During that time the Chases were occupied with seeing through the construction of their new corporate headquarters. The existing buildings were acquired and demolished. After Henry Chase died in 1918, his brother Frederick assumed his responsibilities. He continued the good relationship with Gilbert Henry had had.

In the last years of his life, Henry Chase had begun acquiring the land for the bank building. Gilbert was asked to draw up plans, and delivered them in late 1919. Construction began a few months later, and was completed in 1922.

The last building to be added was the dispensary. It had always been planned—Gilbert was instructed to design it in 1916—but the shortage of materials caused by the war resulted in its construction being put off. In 1923 the Chase family created a permanent endowment fund for it. Construction began in 1923 and the building was in use within the year.

=== 1925–present:Use, decline and preservation ===
Gilbert had hoped to add a sixth building, a theater, using land owned by the Chases to the east of the bank building and the Power House to the rear of the bank, a ca. 1900 structure the family also had bought to make the complex viable. He drew up plans for it in 1919, but after the completion of the dispensary other projects, such as the Supreme Court building in Washington, drew his attention and he was unable to return to Waterbury before he died in 1934. The land was eventually sold to the federal government in the late 1930s for the city's new post office.

In 1930 the city's Chamber of Commerce moved into the Power House from Lincoln House. The charities and dispensary were very busy places at that time with the onset of the Great Depression. President Franklin D. Roosevelt and his wife Eleanor visited City Hall in 1936 on their way to a rally in Library Park.

World War II affected the buildings as well. Scrap metal was piled up on the entourage in front of City Hall, and the tower was surrounded with scaffolding so that air wardens could keep watch from it. The Power House's door was sandbagged. Parades on V-E and V-J days were held down Grand Street with the reviewing section in front City Hall, as parades still are on civic holidays like Independence and Memorial days.

After the war, there were other changes. The Lincoln House Association changed its name again, to the Family Service Association (It is now Family Services of Greater Waterbury). Other tenants of the space in those years included the city's Adult Probation Department, Legal Aid, and the local Chamber of Commerce, which was headquartered in the Power House next door. That building was also renovated, sometime before 1950, with the addition of a second story and a paint job, bringing the brick closer to the bank building's limestone and better concealing the divide between the new and old brickwork.

The Chase companies, by then Chase Brass & Copper, continued to use the headquarters building until the early 1960s. In 1963 ten residents interested in preserving the building bought it from the company. After three years, they in turn sold it to the city. It has been used as supplemental municipal office space ever since.

In the late 20th century, other organizations that had been housed in the buildings also left them. The Chamber of Commerce left the Power House in 1960. In 1974, the Family Service Association, in need of space more suited to its needs, left Lincoln House after half a century for new quarters on Murray Street. The dispensary left as well that year. Lincoln House passed through several owners, its future uncertain for a while, until it was rehabilitated into law offices by one. The dispensary is now home to the Connecticut Community Foundation.

By the early 21st century, most city government functions, including the mayor's office and council meetings, had been moved across the street to the Chase Building. City Hall itself had fallen into serious decline. Inspections found water leaking through the ceiling and into the walls and roof, rusting the structural steel and loosening stones on the face. Vandals opened a fire hose in 2005, flooding the entire building. More flooding damaged the building when copper piping was stolen. The Fire Department eventually ordered all government bodies out of the building save the City Clerk's office, which could not function without access to the records vault.

In 2006 the City Council approved a $48 million bond issue to repair and restore the building. Aldermen from the Independent Party who believed the public should decide on a spending program that large succeeded in getting the issue put to a referendum in 2007, which defeated it. After council trimmed the proposal to $36 million, the Independent aldermen agreed not to seek another referendum, and it was adopted. The building was reopened in 2011.

== See also ==
- National Register of Historic Places listings in New Haven County, Connecticut
