= Silas Bronson Library =

Public library in Waterbury, Connecticut

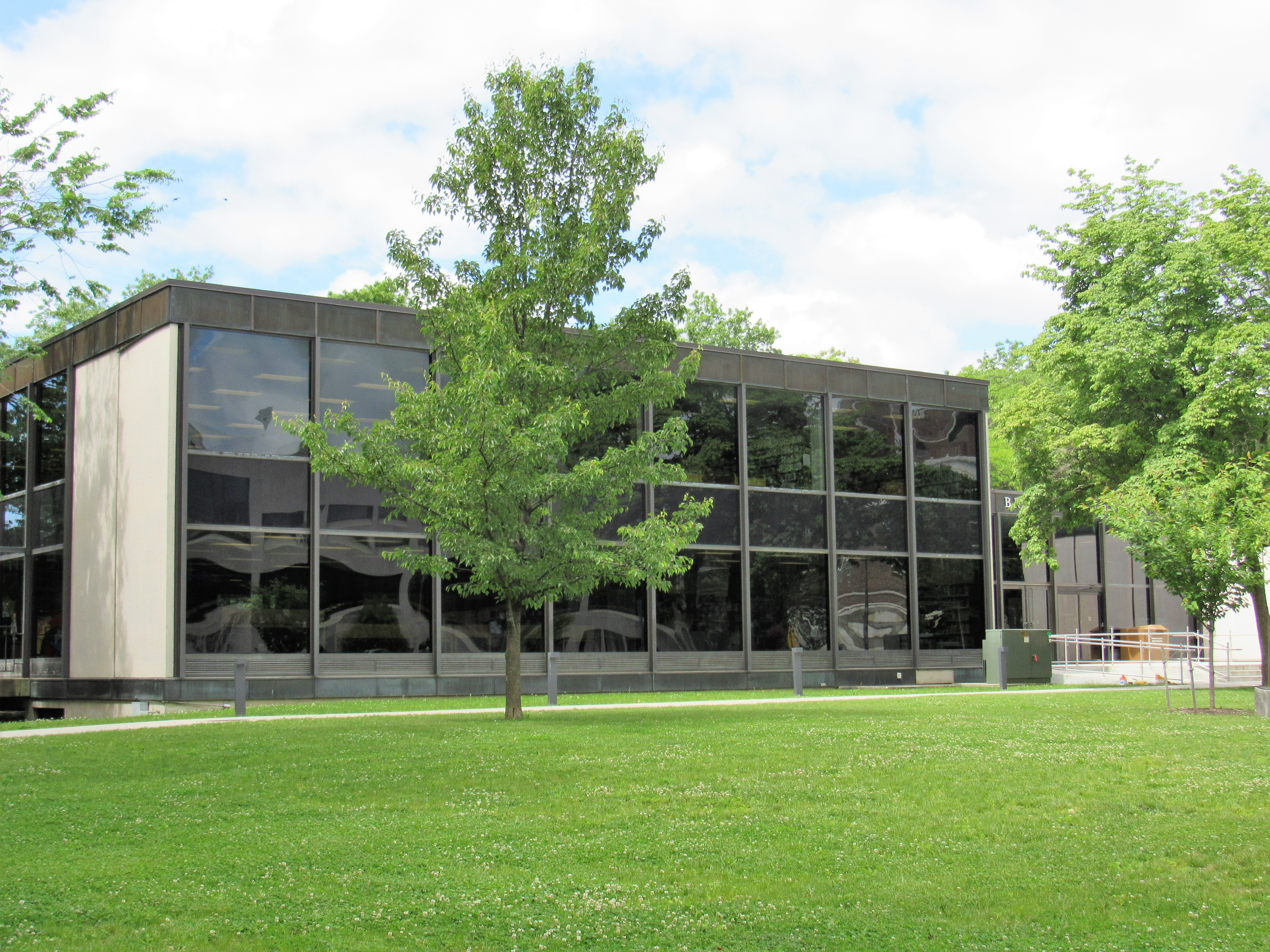
- Main Branch in downtown Waterbury
- 41.55433°N 73.04477°W
- Location: Waterbury, Connecticut
- Type: Public
- Established: 1868; (opened on April 1, 1870)
- Architect: Joseph Stein (Main Branch)
- Branches: 2 (Downtown and Bunker Hill)

Collection
- Size: 271,695 (2021)

Access and use
- Members: 43,179 card holders (2021)

Other information
- Director: Raechel Guest
- Website: bronsonlibrary.org

The Silas Bronson Library is a public library service in Waterbury, Connecticut. It was named after Silas Bronson, a New York City-based merchant and philanthropist who was born in the Waterbury area. Established in 1868 through Bronson's $200,000 bequest, it became the successor to various earlier outlets dating as far back as the end of the 18th century. The service expanded to other neighborhoods, starting in 1907 and after World War II. Its current Main Branch, which opened in 1968, supplanted two previous buildings from 1870 and 1894.

== History ==
=== Predecessors ===
Before the establishment of the Silas Bronson service, various library facilities served the area currently representing Waterbury, Connecticut. The earliest-known, the Union Library, was first recorded in 1797 and operated for at least a decade. Another outlet, Minor's, surfaced in the 1810s but no longer exists. Both of them, plus a third one in what is now Middlebury dating back to the early 1800s decade, were followed by the Waterbury Library in 1822; it became a division of the local Young Men's Institute by 1852.

=== Founding and early years ===
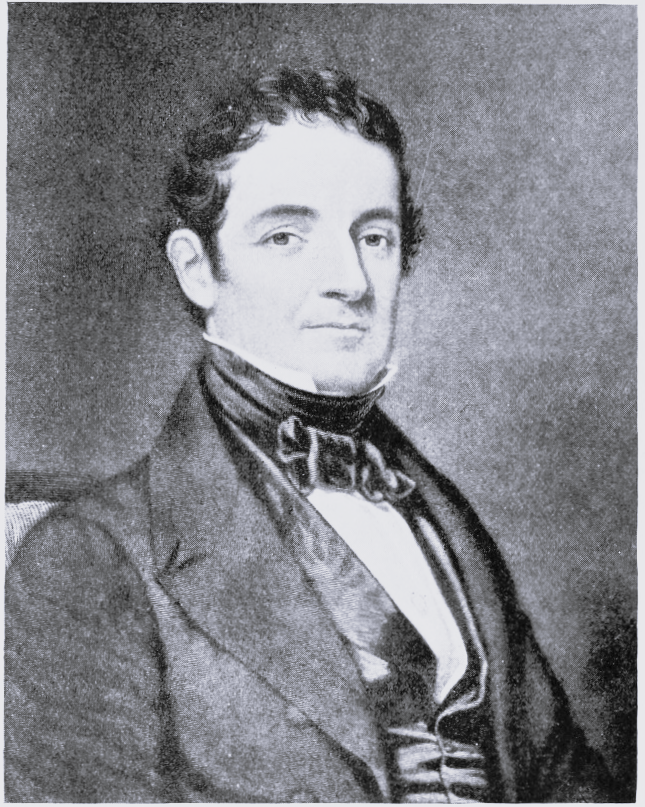
Upon his death in 1867, namesake Silas Bronson bequeathed $200,000 for the establishment of the library serving his original hometown of Waterbury.

The Silas Bronson Library was named after Silas Bronson, a New York City-based merchant and philanthropist born in 1788 in Waterbury's West Farms area (now part of Middlebury). Although Bronson seldom revisited Connecticut or his relatives there, he bequeathed $200,000 towards the establishment of a new public library in Waterbury upon his 1867 death. This gift was allegedly prompted under the imploration of his longtime associate Lucien S. Bronson, and may have been anticipated by John Jacob Astor's $400,000 grant for the New York Public Library in 1848. News of the library funds surprised many of the town's residents, many of whom never knew Bronson.

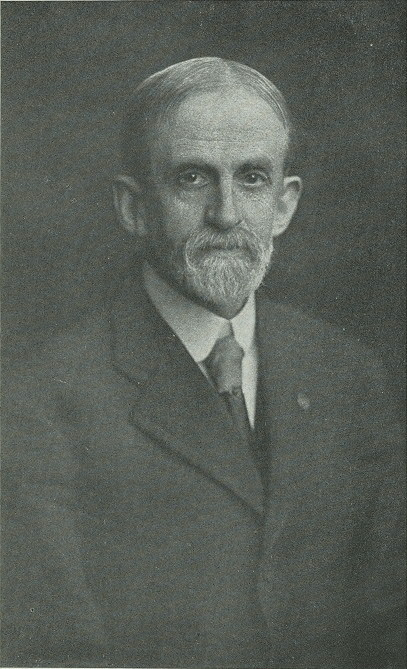
William Isaac Fletcher was Bronson's first Librarian during 1870–72.

In mid-1868, Waterbury officials approved the funds for the new library; $12,000 of the original bequest was taxed by the town the following March 8. It opened on April 1, 1870, with William Isaac Fletcher as its first librarian and a collection of 11,096 volumes, (Note: The number of volumes transferred from the Young Men's Institute precursor has been variously stated as 2,423, 2,500, and 2,559.) at a specially purchased site on Leavenworth Street and Center Square. Within its first two months of operation, 1,593 people registered as patrons; to curb the resulting overcrowding, a women's reading room was launched on the second floor. To prevent soiling by patrons, books were kept in closed shelves, and hands were washed before handling them. Fletcher ended his tenure on September 1, 1872 when he was assigned to Lawrence, Massachusetts, and was succeeded by Homer Franklin Bassett.

Unlike its private-collection forebears, the Bronson Library was a public service from the beginning. During its early years, it also facilitated the preservation of rare and costly books. "Later," newspaper editor William J. Pape would write in 1918, "the pressure of democratic tendencies forced it into line with a movement directed by the American Library Association and having for its aim 'The best books for the largest number at the least cost.' To this library movement so called is due the present system of free libraries supported by the people and appealing to them under the democratic title of 'People's Universities.'"

In 1878, Bronson began discussing their first relocation, and was preparing to purchase a land lot on West Main Street where operations could continue. Lack of a suitable location, along with opposition over the facility's proposed sites, put their plans on hold for 15 years. In late December 1891, a site on Grand Street was chosen under Mayor Charles R. Baldwin's supervision. The library's new Grand Street building, designed by Cady, Berg & See of New York City (with H.S. Kissam as supervising architect), was constructed on a site of 4 acres (1.6 ha) for $63,500 between June 1893 and August 1894 at the city's former burial grounds, whose remains were removed to make way for it. Bronson's collection contained more than 50,000 volumes by the time it moved; in 1896, the facility was said to be the biggest in the state outside Yale University. It inaugurated a children's section in 1898, and in 1902, allowed public access to its shelf stacks for the first time and relaxed its "stringent" borrowing rules, aiding its first wave of popularity. It was temporarily closed in 1902 for two months due to a smallpox epidemic, and again in 1918 for three weeks during the Spanish flu.

=== Expansion ===
The Bronson library launched its first branch on March 26, 1907 in the Waterville neighborhood, on the upper floor of a drugstore building. Encouraged by its success, the service opened more locations over the next several years: South Waterbury in May 1908; Brooklyn on October 23, 1909; and Rose Hill on October 3, 1913. Of these branches, South Waterbury closed after only four years. Bronson became only the third public library in the United States with a business-oriented section when the Main Branch's Industrial Department opened in November 1917. By the late 1910s, twenty were employed at the Grand Street facility, up from seven a few years prior.

During the late 1920s, Lindsay Brown (the librarian at the time) called on the service to open more branches. Progress resumed two decades later as new outlets in the East End (October 1947), North End (early 1951), and Bunker Hill (mid-1962) areas arrived in the wake of Waterbury's population increase during World War II, alongside community demand. The East End facility was converted from a former store, while the one in Bunker Hill was constructed for $40,000. The Main Branch introduced an audio-record section in early 1943, and microfilm services in 1951. As of 2021, only the Bunker Hill branch remains in operation.

=== Later years ===
Concerns over diminishing capacity at Bronson's old Grand Street base (at the expense of its growing patronage) had been raised as early as 1922, when its then-librarian Helen Sperry stated:

Unfortunately our work has reached the limit of its expansion in the present building, such departments as we have being hampered by lack of money for new books, and lack of space, tending to fall into chaos. We need more room everywhere.

Several years later, Sperry's successor Brown felt that Waterbury deserved a replacement facility within a decade, a vision that would only take form starting in 1963. (Note: By the time of groundbreaking, Bronson held over 166,000 books in its collection.) Designed by local architect Joseph Stein, the new Bronson building cost $1.4 million, (Note: The initial section cost $630,000.) measured 46,730 square feet (4,341 m^{2}) in area, and was built in two phases "for operational and financial reasons": The Main Reading Room and front lobby (or "initial section") opened in October 1963, replacing the "four-story bookstack" on the same site, while the East Wing (or "final section") was completed in June 1968 and opened that September 29.

The adult division transitioned to the service's new home in 1964 during construction. Although the children's division remained at the old facility for the time being, Emelyn Barrett Trimble (who had by then taken over from Brown) noted that young patrons attended the new one more than grown-ups, a harbinger of the "public enthusiasm" surrounding the replacement and its aesthetic.

The Bronson service introduced a "Books-by-Mail" program in 1975, and by 2001–2003, what it promoted as "the most advanced technology center at a public library in Connecticut", supported by a $2.125 million grant from the Gates Foundation. In the late 2010s, a "teen zone" and computer classroom were introduced at the Main Branch. In 2019, the Library held its first fundraiser, and sought a new organization logo and website revamp via volunteers from Catchafire. On April 1, 2020, it celebrated its 150th anniversary with a virtual facility tour amid the COVID-19 pandemic.

==== Entertainment ====
In 1997, the Library launched the Waterbury Hall of Fame at the Brass Mill Center, with Rosalind Russell, Jimmy Piersall, and Lucia Chase as some of its first inductees. A 2002 album, The Jazz Trio Alive with Glenda Davenport, was recorded at the premises.

==== Incidents and reputation ====
In October 2017, a Republican-American reporter wrote in light of the Library's then-recent crises, "Silas Bronson is a gem, but in recent years, it seemingly has been unable to avoid negative publicity." They also cited State Governor Dannel Malloy's 2014 denouncement of the facility as "one of the worst" he encountered during his tenure.

===== Embezzlement scandal =====
Over a nine-year period starting in 2005, a Library clerk of 25 years' tenure embezzled over $330,000 in service funds; in 2014, she quit her job soon after her arrest and exposure. The following October, the service received a $238,000 reimbursurement check from Great American Insurance.

===== Other incidents =====
In late 2006, the Bronson Library discarded 20,000 mold-infested items from their collection, pending cleanup and rehabilitation of the basement where they were stored and, thanks to ventilation issues, eventually contaminated. The affected publications, issued between the 19th century and the 1970s, were seldom circulated; some were already available in electronic form. A few that were unique to the facility "help[ed] illustrate Waterbury's industrial history."

During Memorial Day weekend the following year, the Main Branch's air-conditioning system was broken into for its copper, as part of a wave of metal thefts in the state; the copper piping was soon restored. In October 2019, a man placed a phone call to the Library demanding a "First Amendment audit", threatening to bring bodybuilders who would enact citizens' arrest as well as an attorney at the site.

== Main Branch buildings ==
Throughout its history, three different buildings functioned as the Main Branch of the Silas Bronson Library. The first two (from 1870 and 1894) were demolished in later decades, while the third and current one dates back to 1968. The latter two were built at the former grounds of the Grand Street Cemetery, the earliest in Waterbury to be recorded.

=== 1870: Leavenworth and West Main Streets ===
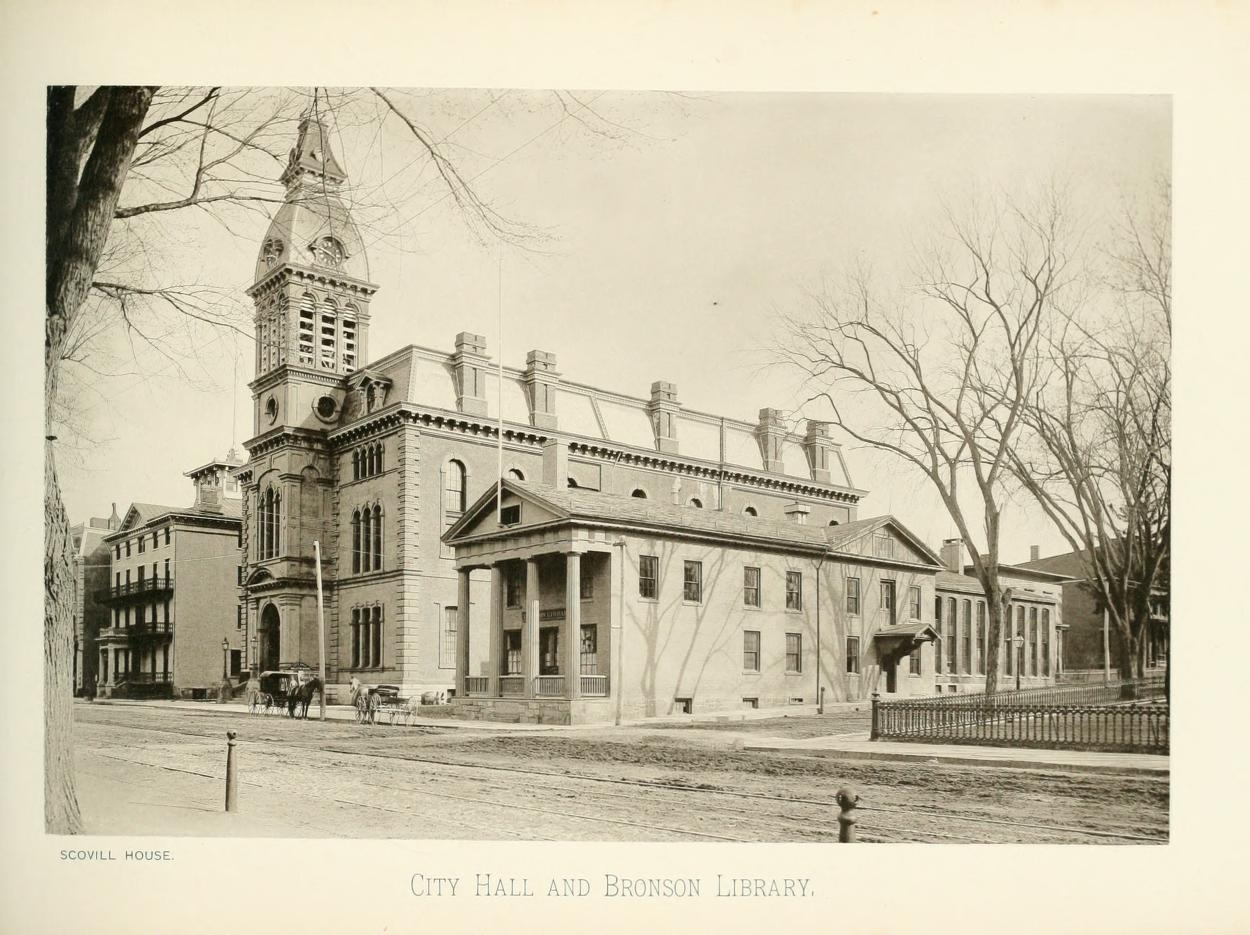
The first incarnation of the Bronson Library stood next to Waterbury's City Hall and shared its space with the Scovill House.

The first Bronson building, on Leavenworth and West Main Streets, was a two-story gabled structure originally constructed by Mark Leavenworth in 1831 for retail use; it assumed several other functions before the Library began operations there. During this early period, Bronson shared its space with the Scovill House and stood next to the local City Hall; the exact position and interior quality during its first year are not known. Library-specific renovations intended from the onset were only carried out during its second year in service. The first relic honoring its namesake, an 1890 portrait from Horace Johnson, was commissioned by the facility. At some point before the 1920s, the Library and Hall were demolished to make way for the Lincoln Store on the same site. (Note: The City Hall was burned by Bernard Murray in 1912.)

=== 1894: Library Park, Grand Street ===
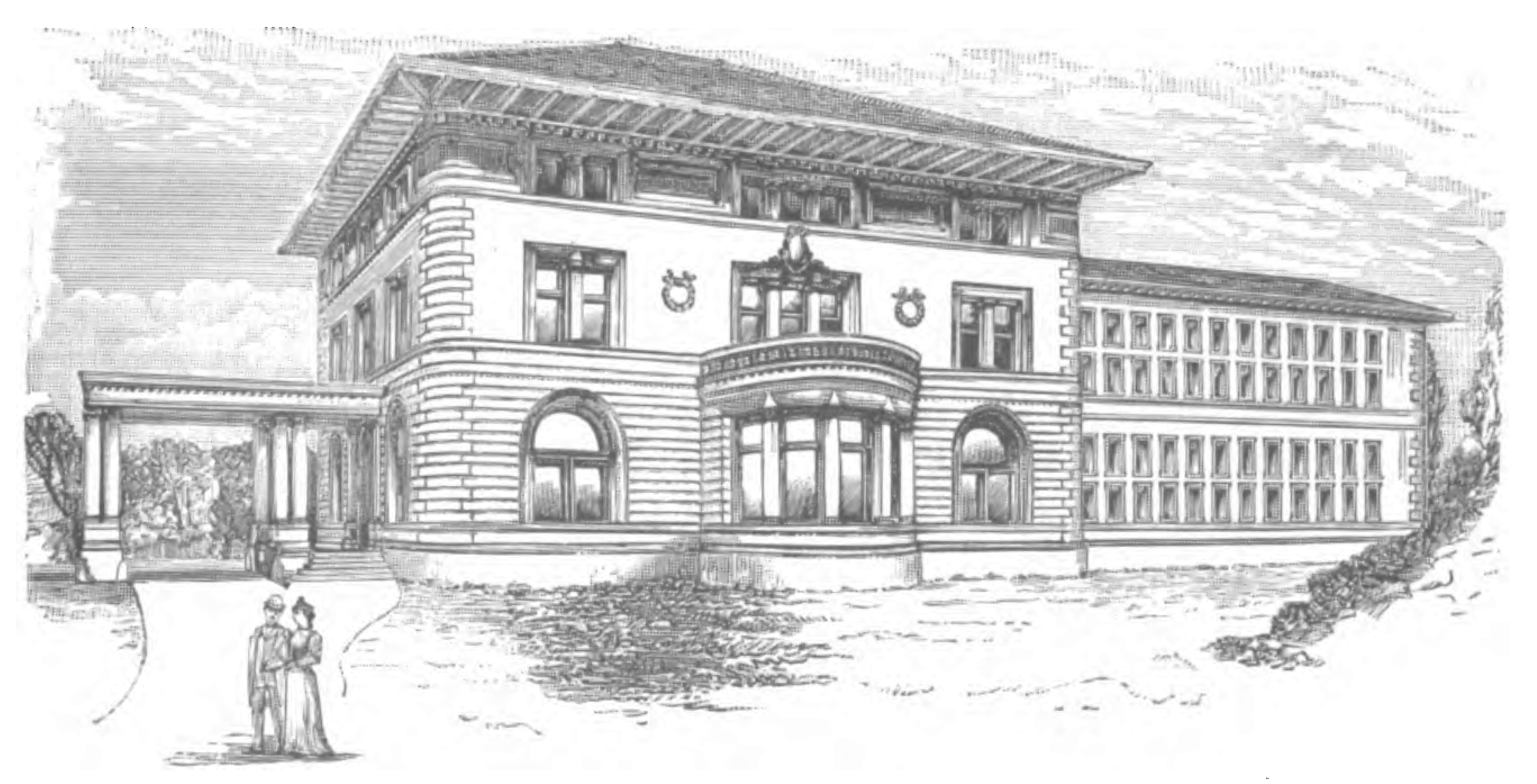
Architectural sketch of the second Bronson building (1896)

The second location, opened in 1894, was built in the Italian Renaissance style and would later face the nearby City Hall at its new location. It introduced a bronze inscription honoring founder Bronson, which read in part:

An enterprising merchant in busy centres of trade, he was not forgetful of his native town, but bequeathed to it the fruit of his industry for the establishment of a free public library, seeking thereby "to encourage and sustain good order and sound morals." Let all who read these books and find help and comfort in them cherish his memory.

An architectural overview was printed in the Waterbury American on July 14, 1894:

The structure as seen from without is of brick, terra cotta and tile, and is designed in the Italian renaissance style, handled in a bold and masterly manner. This style lends itself readily to broad effects and the building impresses the observer with dignity, virility and grace. The low pitch of the tiled roofs, the great overhanging of the main cornice, the disposition and arrangement of the large windows, the strong profiles of the terra cotta trimmings, and the pitted surface peculiar to "washed brick" walls as also the horizontal banding of the courses, combine to give a sense of breadth and richness of color and charming effects of light and shade.

The structure includes two distinct buildings. The first is the administrative and general reference building, for the uses of the public, and is entered under a liberal, well-balanced porch and porte-cochère. The second is a repository for the volumes of general circulation and is accessible only to the employees. The nature and relative importance of the two is fitly and unmistakably expressed in their respective external treatment, while the appearance of the whole as a harmoniously related structure is successfully preserved. Taken altogether, the structure is about 150 feet in length. The main building is about sixty-three feet in depth and the "book-stack" about forty feet. The main building consists of three stories, fifteen, twelve and eleven feet respectively in height. The "stack" consists of four stories, each about seven and one half feet high. The stacks are arranged to secure the maximum of convenience and light, and to accommodate between 175,000 and 220,000 volumes.

The main entrance is on the east, and opens into a large hall. At its extreme end are located the distributing counters and the main central staircase. On the right is the general reading room and on the left are the room of the board of agents and the ladies' reading room. On the west side of the reading room is a "view window," measuring twelve by fifteen feet commanding a fine prospect. Opposite the central staircase are the mantel and fireplace of the main area. The back and floor of the fireplace are of yellow Sienna marble with black seams. The heavy oak border is flanked on either side by graceful columns. Above the bronze iron fireplace is [the bronze inscription dedicated to Bronson].

The fireplace in the general reading room on the north side of the hall is simpler in design than the one just described, but is fully as graceful. It fills a niche in the southwest corner of the room. The face and the hearth are of beautiful Numidian marble. Over the fireplace, cut in the marble, is this inscription from Pibrac:

"Cease not to learne until thou cease to live;
Think that day lost wherein thou draw'st no letter,
Nor gain'st no lesson that new grace may give
To make thyself learneder, wiser, better."

On the second floor are rooms set apart for books of reference in the departments of law, science and the fine arts, and for patent office reports and series of the Congressional Record; also rooms to be used by those pursuing lines of special research. The rooms on the third floor are set apart for collections in natural history, for paintings and statuary, and for water colors and etchings. They are adapted to such uses in the arrangement of the electric lights and skylights as well as in the colors of wall decoration.

The facility was also known for housing mineral, coin, bird, and butterfly specimens in its designated museum. A statue of Benjamin Franklin (by Paul Wayland Bartlett) is situated in front of the premises; designed during 1916, it toured 22 cities prior to its dedication and permanent installation there in 1921.

=== 1968: 267 Grand Street ===
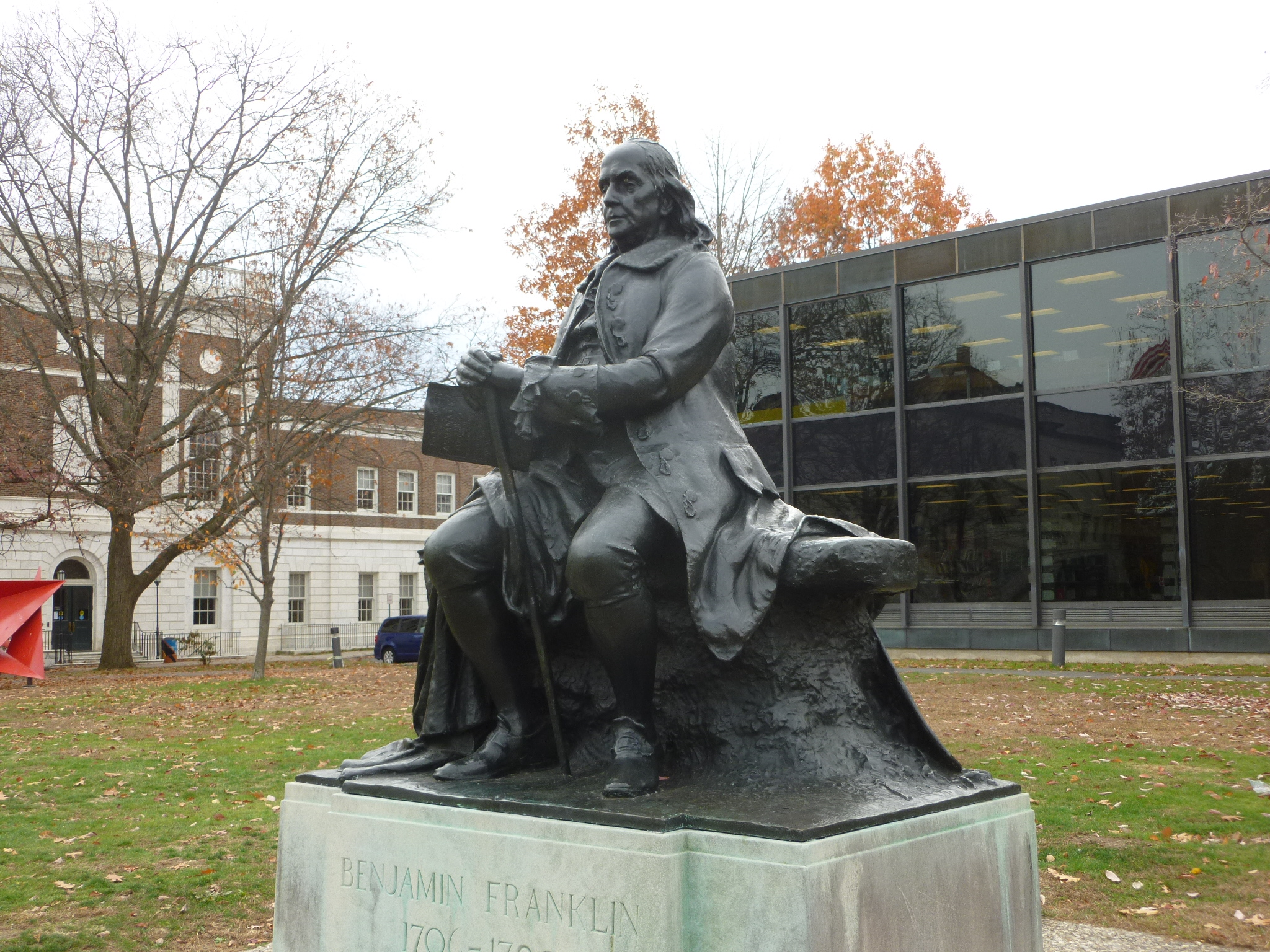
Paul Bartlett's statue of Benjamin Franklin, as seen next to the current Main Branch

The third and current Main Branch is located at 267 Grand Street. Joseph Stein's 1963 design won an Award of Merit in the 1964 edition of the Library Buildings Award Program, held by the American Library Association and the American Institute of Architects. In the sophomore issue of the Connecticut Architect, Sylvan R. Shemitz remarked on the lighting aesthetic, and the "suspended luminous panels suspended free of the concrete forms", in two separate photo captions dedicated to the facility.

In 1983, the Benjamin Franklin statue was joined by "Sperm Whale", a ringed mobile sculpture by Stein's brother Jerome. It consisted of 150 pieces of metal, and was noted for its wind chimes. It was originally placed behind a row of hedges until a car knocked it over sometime after its erection; upon repair by a sign store, it received a new location some distance away. A nighttime burglary in March 2018 led to the melting of most of its original rings for scrap, leaving only 15 intact; an arrest was made thereafter. A year later, plans were enacted for a faithful re-creation that would stand higher at a different location, based on old reference photographs from the Library and other parties.

== Librarians ==
Over its first 100 years, the Silas Bronson Library appointed five Librarians for its Main Branch:

- William Isaac Fletcher (April 1, 1870–September 1, 1872)
- Homer Franklin Bassett (September 1, 1872–1901)
- Helen Sperry (1901–1925)
- Lindsay Brown (1925–May 1, 1929)
- Emelyn Barrett Trimble (May 1, 1929–ca. 1970s)

== Logo ==
The Bronson logo, introduced in 2018, is based on the "Sperm Whale" sculpture and was chosen by patrons out of three poll finalists. Library Director Raechel Guest, who wanted a logo "that reflected the rejuvenated Library", commissioned a Seattle Catchafire member by the name of "Gabriel" for the task; several design concepts were explored during development.

== See also ==
- Waterbury Municipal Center Complex
- Downtown Waterbury Historic District
