= Bunker Hill (Waterbury) =

Coordinates: 41°34′16″N 73°03′48″W

Bunker Hill is a neighborhood of the city of Waterbury, Connecticut. Though part of the city of Waterbury, it has its own identity with its own commercial center, schools, parks and gatherings. Like the other sections/neighborhoods of Waterbury, its distinctive character, shaped by the history and geography of the city, has led residents to form an unusual loyalty to their neighborhood.

== Geography ==
Bunker Hill lies northwest of Downtown Waterbury. It borders Watertown to the north and the Waterville and Robinwood neighborhoods to the east and south. The Bunker Hill area is accessed by the Route 8 Expressway and Route 63.

== Infrastructure ==
The area contains mostly single-family, residential homes. Many of the homes are on the National Historic District. There are 3 schools in Bunker Hill; including Bunker Hill Elementary School, Carrington Middle School, and The Catholic Academy of Waterbury.

== Demographics ==
Bunker Hill is supported by the residents who live there. The Bunker Hill Neighborhood Association exists for the purpose to promote the community and discuss matters pertaining directly to the neighborhood. The area is diverse. As many other parts/neighborhoods in Waterbury are identified by their culture; be it Italian in Town Plot and the North End or the French Canadian influence in the South End, Bunker Hill remains distinctive by its own character.

== 1962 Tornado ==
On May 24, 1962, the neighborhood was heavily damaged by a high-end F3 tornado that unroofed or flattened numerous homes throughout the area. The storm left one dead and 50 injured.

== 1989 Tornado ==
Several towns in New York and Connecticut were particularly hard-hit on July 10, 1989. Several homes were leveled in Schoharie, New York and extensive damage occurred in Bantam, Connecticut. The flag pole in the center of the Waterbury green was bent over. A large section of Hamden, Connecticut, including an industrial park and hundreds of homes, was destroyed; and in some places buildings were flattened to the ground. In Waterbury, Connecticut, mayor Joseph Santopietro declared a state of emergency due to extensive damage in the city. [ref]5[/ref]
