= Leah Juliett =

Poet and activist

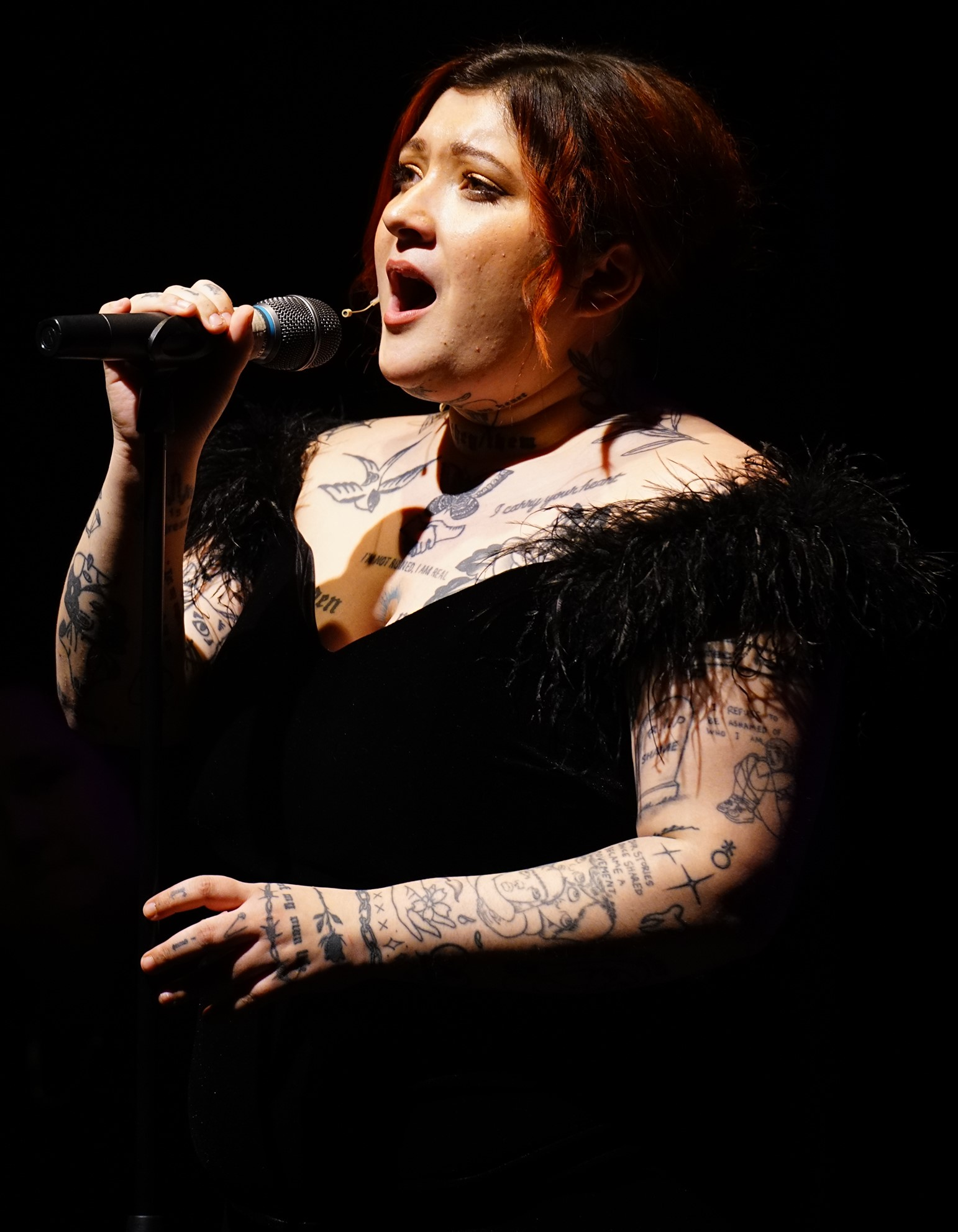
- Juliett in 2022
- Born: Leah Ann Ciccone; January 30, 1997 (age 29); Connecticut
- Education: Western Connecticut State University
- Known for: Activism
- Honours: L'Oreal Paris Woman of Worth

Leah Juliett (née Leah Ann Ciccone; born January 30, 1997) is an American LGBTQ+ activist, spoken word poet, nonprofit leader, and award-winning philanthropist from Connecticut. In 2021, Juliett released their debut collection of poetry, Naked in Public. Juliett is nonbinary and uses they/them/theirs pronouns.

== Early life and education ==
Juliett was born on January 30, 1997, in Waterbury, Connecticut. They served as President of the Student Government and Gay-Straight Alliance at Wolcott High School and attended Western Connecticut State University, where they majored in Political science with honors. Juliett was a victim of child sexual abuse material (CSAM) and revenge porn when they were a teenager.

== Advocacy ==
In 2016, as a College Student, Juliett founded March Against Revenge Porn, a nonprofit organization that raises awareness of technology-facilitated sexual abuse. On April 1, 2017, Juliett led a march across the Brooklyn Bridge that received national news coverage. In 2018, Juliett was recognized by Glamour Magazine as a College Woman of the Year, GLAAD Rising Star, and was the 2018 recipient of the Delta Air Lines Accelerating Acceptance grant. In 2020, Juliett was honored by L’Oreal Paris as a Woman of Worth and was introduced by Academy Award winner Helen Mirren on primetime television. Juliett is also a George H.W. Bush Point of Light, and in 2021 was named a "Champion of Pride" by The Advocate Magazine.

In 2018, beauty publication Very Good Light noted that Juliett "shows courage beyond their years in fighting for LGBTQ rights."

In June 2022, Juliett appeared in L'Oréal's All Love is Worth It campaign for Pride Month.

In September 2022, Juliett's story was featured in the law book The Fight for Privacy by MacArthur Fellow Danielle Keats Citron.

In December 2022, Juliett appeared on Good Morning Connecticut to announce they were organizing a benefit concert following the shooting at Club Q in Colorado Springs.

== Career ==
=== Politics ===
From 2017 to 2019, Juliett worked in Congress for Congresswoman Elizabeth Esty, Senator Chris Murphy, and as a writer for Democratic Leader Chuck Schumer. In 2018, Juliett wrote an open letter to Congress about gun violence that was signed by over 100 college activists from around the country.

=== Writing ===
In 2018, Juliett was a recipient of an "Excellence in Journalism" award from the National Association of LGBTQ+ Journalists. Their writing has been published in Glamour Magazine, Salty World, and MTV News. In 2021, Juliett published their debut book of poetry, Naked in Public after their popular online essay of the same name. Juliett has also served as both an Ambassador and Writer for GLAAD .

=== Speaking ===
In 2017, Juliett delivered a keynote speech at the University of Minnesota School of Law for their 40th anniversary. In 2018, Juliett spoke at the GLAAD Media Awards at the Beverly Hills Hotel, and introduced American Olympian figure skater Adam Rippon at New York City Hall.

== Pageantry ==
Since 2020, Juliett has been actively involved in the Miss America organization through the Miss Connecticut competition, and has raised awareness for the need for increased representation of LGBTQ pageant candidates. In 2022, Juliett announced their partnership with poet and podcast host Sierra DeMulder and DuVide Media to produce the podcast "There They Are", following Juliett's journey in pageantry.

== Awards and recognitions ==
Year	Association	Award	Result	Citation
2021	The Advocate	Champion of Pride	Won	
2021	George H.W. Bush Points of Light	Daily Point of Light	Won	
2020	L'Oreal Paris	Woman of Worth	Won	
2018	GLAAD	Rising Star	Won	
2018	Delta Air Lines	Accelerating Acceptance Award	Won	
2018	Glamour	College Woman of the Year	Won	
2018	NGLJA	Excellence in Journalism	Won	

== Personal life ==
Juliett came out as gay when they were thirteen years old and nonbinary when they were nineteen years old. In a 2021 interview with L'Oreal Paris, Juliett called themself a "liberated, unapologetically queer, fat, trans, tattooed, survivor of sexual violence living with mental illness".
