= Waterbury Public Schools =

School district in Connecticut, United States

Address
- 236 Grand Street Waterbury, Connecticut 06702; United States

District information
- Type: Public
- Grades: Pre-K – 12
- Superintendent: Darren M. Schwartz
- Schools: 30

Students and staff
- Students: 18,807 (October 2019)
- Teachers: 1,505

Other information
- Website: waterbury.k12.ct.us

Waterbury Public Schools is a school district based in Waterbury, Connecticut, United States.

The district serves over 18,000 students. Waterbury is notable as the first school district in Connecticut to establish a dress code for all students. Waterbury Public Schools operates under the leadership of a superintendent and a board of education that consists of 10 elected members and the city mayor. The superintendent's position is currently vacant.

Waterbury's 1,500 teachers work in 30 schools and educational programs. They belong to the Waterbury Teachers' Association.

== History ==
Waterbury's first public high school opened in 1851.

On July 1, 2018, Dr. Verna D. Ruffin began her first term as superintendent, chosen by the board of education and Mayor Neil O'Leary, due to her experience with urban school districts.

In June and July 2022, the United States Department of Justice began an investigation in the district due to possible mistreatment of special education students, "including seclusion rooms and restraints," according to News 8 WTNH.

On July 8, 2024, Mayor Paul K. Pernerewski Jr. terminated Ruffin's contract against the wishes of the board of education, citing a lack of confidence from staff and parents within the district, poor behavior from students, low test scores, and the fact that Ruffin had never notified him nor the previous mayor of the Department of Justice investigations.

== District Reference Group I ==
Waterbury is one of the seven public school systems in District Reference Group I, a classification made by the state Department of Education for the purpose of comparison with the achievement levels of similar schools. District reference groups are defined as "districts whose students' families are similar in education, income, occupation and need, and that have roughly similar enrollment". The other six school districts in the group are Bridgeport, Hartford, New Britain, New Haven, New London, and Windham.

== Schools ==
=== High Schools ===
- Crosby High School (Principal: Michael Verroneau)
- John F. Kennedy High School (Principal: Robert Johnston)
- Waterbury Arts Magnet School (Principal: Dr. Maria Stasaitis)
- Waterbury Career Academy (Principal: Michael Harris)
- Wilby High School (Principal: Kenny Pierresaint)

=== Intermediate/Middle Schools ===
- North End Middle School (Principal: Jacquelyn Gilmore)
- Wallace Middle School (Principal: Vincent Balsamo)
- Wallace Academic Academy Grades 4-8 (Principal: Melinda Grove)
- Waterbury Arts Magnet School (Principal: Dr. Maria Stasaitis)
- West Side Middle School (Principal: Peter McCasland)

=== Elementary Schools ===
- B.W. Tinker Elementary School (Principal: Ryan Sullivan)
- Bucks Hill Elementary School (Principal: Maria Jimenez)
- Bunker Hill Elementary School (Principal: Brittany Dunn)
- Carrington Elementary School (Principal: Karen Renna)
- Chase Elementary School (Principal: Lori Eldridge)
- Driggs Elementary School (Principal: Dr. Jennifer Rosser)
- Duggan Elementary School (Principal: Melissa DiGiovanni)
- F.J. Kingsbury Elementary School (Principal: Hannah Sam)
- Generali Elementary School (Principal: Kristen Copperthite)
- Hopeville Elementary School (Principal: Julissa Crespo)
- John G. Gilmartin Elementary School (Principal: Erika Lanza)
- Maloney Interdistrict Magnet School (Principal: Diane Bakewell)
- Reed Elementary School (Principal: Erik Brown)
- Regan Elementary School (Principal: Angela Razza)
- Roberto Clemente International Dual Language School (Principal: Diurca Tomasella)
- Rotella Interdistrict Magnet School (Principal: Robin Henry)
- Sprague Elementary School (Principal: Stephanie Carpentieri)
- Walsh Elementary School (Principal: Dr. Maureen Wilson)
- Washington Elementary School (Principal: Inez Ramirez)
- Wendell Cross Elementary School (Principal: Donna Cullen)
- Woodrow Wilson Elementary School (Principal: Michael Theriault)
