= Waterbury Career Academy =

Coordinates: 41.5575°N 73.0203°W

- Waterbury, Connecticut

Information
- Type: Public
- Opened: Fall 2013
- School district: Waterbury Public Schools
- Principal: Michael Harris
- Faculty: 70-90 staff members
- Enrollment: 865 (2016-17)
- Colors: Black and Gold
- Mascot: Spartans
- Website: https://wca.waterbury.k12.ct.us/

The Waterbury Career Academy is a high school located in the North End section of Waterbury, Connecticut, in the United States. The school consists of four strands. Students are able to pick a strand at the end of their freshman term. It is a part of Waterbury Public Schools. Jade L. Gopie took the role as Principal in August 2020 after former principal Dr. Louis A. Padua announced his retirement. Then in October 2021, Michael Harris, former assistant principal, was promoted to principal after Gopie was promoted to Assistant Superintendent.

As of 2023, School is currently run by Principal Michael Harris and Assistant Principals Jennifer Franceskino and Peter Flammia

Their first graduating class occurred in 2017.

== Strands ==
- Information Technology and Engineering/Business
- Manufacturing
- Education & Training
- Health Sciences

== Athletics ==
Wins in CIAC State Championships
Sport	Class	Year(s)
Basketball (boys)	III	2023

== Notable Alumni ==
- Victor Figueroa, Class of 2022. Youngest student to teach high school and elementary school classes at the age of 16. He is now a substitute teacher in the state of Connecticut. He is studying Elementary Education at Central Connecticut State University. He also serves as a Scholar Ambassador for the Waterbury Promise organization.
