= Silas Bronson =

Connecticut merchant and philanthropist (1788–1867)

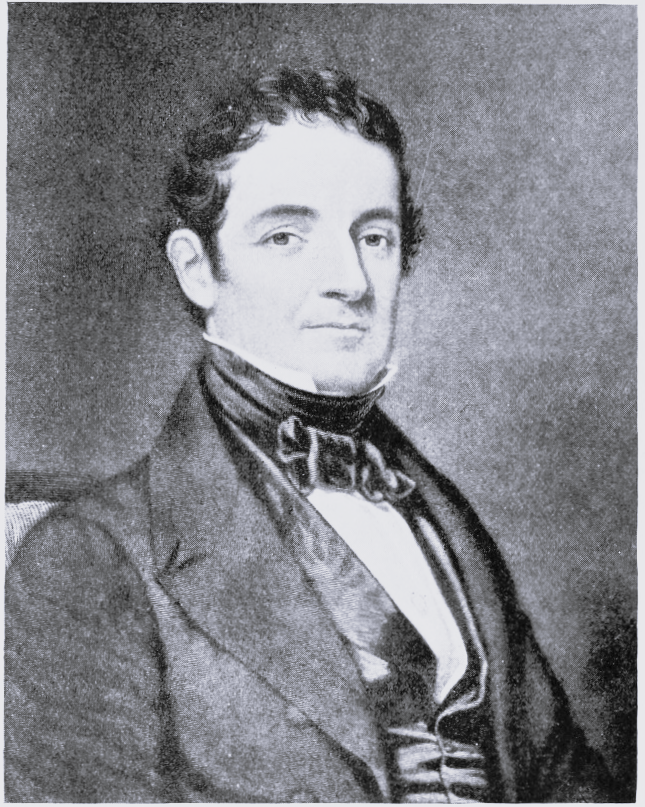
- Born: February 15, 1788; West Farms, Waterbury, Connecticut (now part of Middlebury)
- Died: November 24, 1867 (aged 79); New York City
- Occupation(s): Merchant; Philanthropist

Signature
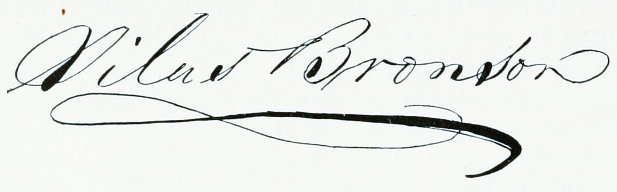

Silas Bronson (February 15, 1788 – November 24, 1867) was a Connecticut-born merchant and philanthropist based in New York City. Born to a farmer in what is now Middlebury, Bronson grew up to become a successful merchant in Georgia and New York. Although he seldom revisited Connecticut or his relatives there, he managed to bequeath US$200,000 towards the funding of a public library in Waterbury by the time of his death. At the end of the 19th century, his legacy was commemorated in a portrait and bronze inscription at the facility named after him.

== Life and career ==
Silas Bronson was born on February 15, 1788 in the West Farms area of Waterbury, Connecticut (now part of Middlebury); he was the second of eight children of Elijah Bronson (a farmer) and Lois Bunnell. He was born in the same "Old Bronson Place" as his cousin Titus Bronson, the founder of Kalamazoo in Michigan.

Since Elijah Bronson's income was modest, his children were encouraged to support themselves at a young age. While still in Connecticut, his son Silas had a limited common school education, and took up carpentry for four years; he also worked as a farmer and store clerk in his youth. Around the age of 21, Silas Bronson moved to the Augusta, Georgia area and eventually spent at least 15 years as a merchant there. Upon moving to New York City in 1830, he specialized in selling dry goods and later moved on to commissioning. Although he ran an increasingly successful business and became a millionaire (despite facing some setback after 1835's Great Fire), his health later began to deteriorate, causing him to end his ventures and retire. His plans to open a boys' school in the vein of Vassar College—founded by a friend of his, Matthew Vassar—were also canceled amid his ill health. From the mid-1840s up until 1864–65, he was listed as a director of the American Exchange Bank of New York.

Bronson never married, nor did he often revisit Connecticut or his relatives there. He died on November 24, 1867 at New York's St. Nicholas Hotel. In his will, he left:

- $15,000 to each of his nieces and nephews (numbering at least 25);
- another $25,000 to the New York City Hospital;
- and $200,000 towards the funding of a public library in his former hometown of Waterbury, a gift allegedly prompted under the imploration of his longtime associate Lucien S. Bronson.

Bronson's decision to bequeath money for library services in Waterbury may have followed on the heels of John Jacob Astor's $400,000 grant to establish the New York Public Library in 1848. News of the library funds surprised most of the town's residents, most of whom never knew him. Contemporary and later biographies did not state whether Bronson possessed an affinity for books or reading.

== Legacy ==
A year after Bronson's death, the Waterbury authorities used his $200,000 gift to establish the Silas Bronson Library, whose service remains in operation today. In the later years of the 19th century, an unnamed friend of his commented on his generosity; in a 1966 thesis, M. W. Mitchell deemed him "a hardworking, industrious individual."

In 1890, the library commissioned a portrait of its namesake founder by Horace Johnson. A bronze inscription at the facility, dedicated to his legacy, read in part:

An enterprising merchant in busy centres of trade, he was not forgetful of his native town, but bequeathed to it the fruit of his industry for the establishment of a free public library, seeking thereby "to encourage and sustain good order and sound morals." Let all who read these books and find help and comfort in them cherish his memory.
