= George Harlamon =

American politician

George P. Harlamon

40th Mayor of Waterbury, Connecticut
- In office June 1, 1968 – January 1, 1970
- Preceded by: Frederick W. Palomba
- Succeeded by: Edward D. Bergin

Personal details
- Born: February 5, 1919 Waterbury, Connecticut
- Died: May 14, 2011 (aged 92) Waterbury, Connecticut
- Party: Republican Party
- Education: Fordham University University of Connecticut
- Occupation: Politician, businessman

Military service
- Branch/service: U.S. Army

George Peter Harlamon (February 5, 1919 – May 14, 2011) was an American municipal politician. A member of the Republican Party, Harlamon served as the mayor of Waterbury, Connecticut, from June 1968 to January 1970. Harlamon is noted for peacefully resolving race riots in Waterbury during the summer of 1969.

== Early life ==
Harlamon was born in Waterbury, Connecticut on February 5, 1919. He served as a sergeant in the U.S. Army in the Philippines during World War II. Afterwards, he received a bachelor in accounting, with honors, from Fordham University and an MBA from the University of Connecticut.

== Career ==
Harlamon worked initially for the General Accounting Office in Washington D.C. He returned to Waterbury to work for the Chase Brass and Copper Company and, in 1966, became the comptroller for Waterbury National Bank.

In 1968, Harlamon was President of the Board of Aldermen when then mayor Frederick W. Palomba resigned after suffering a heart attack, just six months into his 2nd term. Harlamon assumed the office of mayor on June 1, 1968. During the summer of 1969, Waterbury was beset by race riots. Waterbury's African-American citizens led a fight for civil rights against charges of segregation and racism. With the threat of further violence and rioting, Harlamon, against the advice of city officials, met with the protesters and helped to craft an agreement that ended the riots. Civil rights leaders later cited Harlamon's personal trust and leadership with bringing a peaceful resolution to the conflict.

Several months later Harlamon lost the mayoral election to Edward D. Bergin, who won his fourth non-consecutive term as Mayor of Waterbury. He left office on January 1, 1970.

Harlamon also served on the city's Board of Finance and Board of Park Commissioners. He was President of the Board of Park Commissioners for 9 years. In recognition of his service to the City of Waterbury and his civic involvement as a member of the Board of Directors of the YMCA, Mattatuck Museum, Waterbury Exchange Club and the Waterbury Symphony Orchestra, Harlamon was elected to the Waterbury Hall of Fame in 2003.

== Personal life ==
Harlamon and his wife, Katherine, had two children, Peter and James. He was an active member of the Greek Orthodox Church.

Political offices
Preceded by Frederick W. Palomba	Mayors of Waterbury, Connecticut; 1968-1970	Succeeded by Edward D. Bergin
