= Rachael Chong =

Australian businessman

- Born: Rachael Chong; Canberra, Australia
- Occupations: Founder and CEO, Catchafire
- Website: Catchafire

Rachael Chong (born Canberra, Australia) is Founder and CEO of Catchafire, a skills-based volunteer platform, public speaker, and social entrepreneur.

== Background ==
Chong was born in Canberra, Australia. When she was eight years old, her mother began working for the Australian foreign service, resulting in a childhood spent traveling throughout Asia. Rachael received her undergraduate degree from Barnard College at Columbia University, graduating magna cum laude, and a Masters in Public Policy from Duke University. The thesis she wrote for her Masters would become the business plan for Catchafire. Chong began her career on Wall Street, working for UBS and Goldman Sachs. Chong then helped Susan Davis start BRAC USA (an affiliate of BRAC, the world's largest non-governmental development organization) and, "by strategically utilizing pro bono talent," raised over $10 million in less than nine months. "Fresh off this success, Chong founded Catchafire in 2009 with a vision to create a more efficient and effective social good sector, and a world where it is commonplace to serve for the greater good."

Rachael Chong has been named one of the World Economic Forum’s Young Global Leaders for 2015, one of Fast Company’s 100 Most Creative People in Business (2012 and 2014), has received the GLG Social Impact Fellowship (2014), the NYC Venture Fellowship (2012), the Tribeca Disruptive Innovation Award (2012), #1 in Huffington Post's Innovators Series (2010), and has presented at two TEDx events. Her company, Catchafire, has been featured in The Wall Street Journal, The New York Times, Mashable, NPR, FOX Business, CNN Money, Forbes, Fast Company, TechCrunch, and facilitated two series in partnership with Fast Company on The Future of Service in America and The Most Generous People in Business. She is featured in an exhibit at the New-York Historical Society titled Chinese American: Exclusion/Inclusion. Rachael was also awarded an honorary PhD from Merrimack College in 2014. https://www.merrimack.edu/news/star-charlie-day-98-to-deliver-undergraduate-commencement-keynote-address/

== Catchafire ==
Catchafire is the world's largest skills-based volunteer platform, providing nonprofits and social enterprises access to skilled professionals. The company's mission is "to create a more efficient and effective social good sector, and a world where it is commonplace to serve for the greater good. They believe that all social good organizations should have access to top talent, that all people should have the opportunity to use their talents for good, and that people should have the opportunity to be transformed by a positive volunteer experience.". The company was incorporated in 2009, and launched online in September 2010. Catchafire is a certified B Corporation, which requires a company to meet "rigorous standards of social and environmental performance, accountability, and transparency."

== See also ==
- Skills-based volunteering
- Social entrepreneurship
- World Economic Forum
- Young Global Leader
