= William Henry Bristol =

- Born: William Henry Bristol; July 5, 1859; Waterbury, Connecticut
- Died: June 18, 1930 (72 Years)
- Resting place: Riverside Cemetery, Waterbury, CT
- Education: Stevens Institute of Technology
- Spouse: Elise Myers
- Awards: John Scott Medal, Edward Longstreth Medal

William Henry Bristol (July 5, 1859 – June 18, 1930) was an inventor, manufacturer, educator, and environmentalist. Bristol was born in Waterbury, Connecticut.

After graduating from the Stevens Institute of Technology in 1884 with an engineering degree, he returned there in 1886 as an instructor and progressed to become a professor of mathematics in 1899. While at Stevens, he patented products including a steel lacing for industrial belts and a pressure chart recorder. The need to manufacture these products led to the founding of the Bristol Company in 1889 with his brother, Franklin, and his father, Benjamin.

By 1915, the company was manufacturing the largest and most complete line of industrial instruments in the world, including instruments to measure and record temperature, electricity, pressure, motion, time, flow, and humidity. These instruments were the first to provide an uninterrupted history of manufacturing plant operations; increasing efficiency, improving quality, and allowing higher rates of productivity.

He was awarded the John Scott Medal in 1890. Edward Longstreth Medal from the Franklin Institute in 1894.

In 1904, Professor Bristol invented the first practical pyrometer for measuring high temperatures. This created another new industry and led to the formation of the William H. Bristol Pyrometer Company in New York City.

In 1915, he invented the “Bristolphone” to simultaneously record voices and other sounds with motion in moving pictures. He founded the William H. Bristol Talking Picture Corporation to develop “synchronized talking motion pictures,” and produced one of the first full-length motion pictures with sound. The Bristolphone was used in nearly one hundred movie houses in the U.S. He also developed and manufactured loud speakers, power amplifiers, radios and phonograph recorders. His “Audiophone,” which was used at Yankee Stadium and Grand Central Station in New York, revolutionized public address systems.

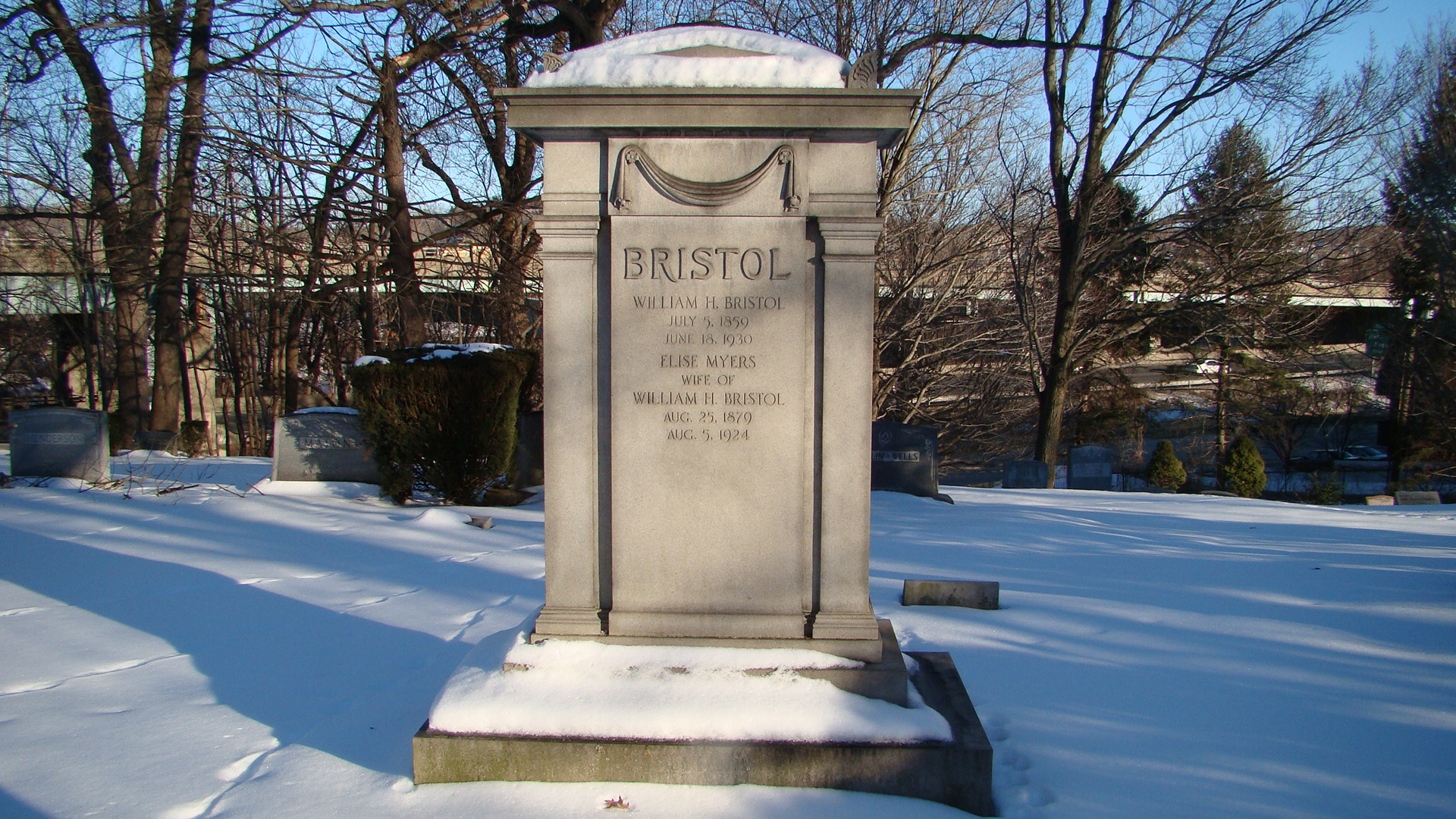
Photo of the resting place of William H Bristol and his wife, in Riverside Cemetery, Waterbury, CT.

William Bristol was awarded medals at expositions in Chicago (1893), Paris (1900), Saint Louis (1904), San Francisco (1915) and Philadelphia (1926). He received two awards from the Franklin Institute to honor his distinguished career. He gained worldwide recognition while making possible major advances in both pure scientific knowledge and industrial technology. Bristol, who received nearly 100 patents during his lifetime, died on June 18, 1930.
