= Waterbury Arts Magnet School =

Public magnet school in Waterbury, Connecticut

Location
- 16 South Elm Street; Waterbury, Connecticut 06706; United States; 41°33′16″N 73°02′14″W

Information
- School type: Public magnet school
- Motto: ARTS–Achieve Respect Trust and Succeed
- Opened: 2004 (22 years ago)
- Status: Open
- School district: Waterbury Public Schools
- Superintendent: Darren M. Schwartz
- CEEB code: 070867
- Principal: Maria Stasaitis
- Grades: 6-12
- Hours in school day: 6 hours and 30 minutes
- Campus type: Urban
- Communities served: Waterbury, Naugatuck, Plymouth/Terryville, Region 15, Thomaston, Wolcott
- Website: wams.waterbury.k12.ct.us

Waterbury Arts Magnet School is a public middle and high school located in downtown Waterbury, Connecticut. The school opened in 2004 alongside the newly renovated Palace Theater, to which the school is granted limited access for assemblies and performances. Prominent features of the school include various performance spaces, music labs, and a television studio.

== Notable alumni ==
- Christopher Briney, actor, known for his role as Conrad Fisher in the Amazon Prime Video series The Summer I Turned Pretty
