= Two Moon Meridas =

American herbal medicine merchant

- Born: Chico Colon Meridan c. 1888
- Died: November 3, 1933 (aged 44–45); Waterbury, Connecticut, U.S.
- Resting place: Hillside Cemetery; Roslyn, Pennsylvania, U.S.

Two Moon Meridas (c. 1888 – 1933) was an American seller of herbal medicine who claimed that he was of Sioux birth.

== Early life ==
Meridas was born Chico Colon Meridan, son of Chico Meridan and Mary Tumoon, both of whom were born in Mexico. Meridan claimed that he was born in Devils Lake, North Dakota, though this was never confirmed. Later, his marriage certificate recorded his date of birth as August 29, 1888, but this information is unconfirmed.

== Career ==
By 1914, Meridas was selling herbal medicines in the streets of Philadelphia and New York City. In New York, he met Helen Gertrude Nugent and later married her. Shortly afterwards they moved to Waterbury, Connecticut. Meridas began to sell his herbal medicines from his house. Contemporary newspaper accounts stated that during the 1918 influenza epidemic, none of his patients died. This increased his prestige and clientele. His most famous product was "Bitter Oil", a laxative that was widely marketed as a cure-all.

In 1921, Meridas moved to a larger house and established an extensive and prosperous herb business in a storefront at 1898 East Main Street. He built his own laboratory at 1864 East Main Street in 1925. His business increased to such an extent that he had a fleet of buses for his salesmen and an airplane. He took money only for his products, not his advice. He spent lavishly but also surreptitiously donated to charities and to the poor.

In 1928, Meridas was presented with the ceremonial key to Atlantic City, New Jersey after founding his Indian Temple there.

Throughout his life, Meridas claimed that he was a Pueblo Indian. However, the United States Department of the Interior refused to certify that he was an American Indian, although he was presented as one in his publicity. On August 6, 1930, the Oglala Lakota Sioux of the Pine Ridge Reservation gave him the honorary title of chief, because of his financial help during the Great Depression.

In October 1930, Meridas and his wife traveled to Europe to meet Pope Pius XI. On May 3, 1932, Meridas was indicted and later convicted of practicing medicine without a license in New York and Connecticut. In November 1932, Meridas brought 26 Sioux to Waterbury to speak for his defense, some of whom stated that they had taken part in the Battle of the Little Big Horn. They also stated that Meridas had been named an Honorary Chief of the Sioux. They later celebrated at Meridas' Connecticut estate.

== Death ==
Meridas died on November 3, 1933, in Waterbury, Connecticut. He is buried in Hillside Cemetery in Roslyn, Pennsylvania.
