= Abraham Bronson =

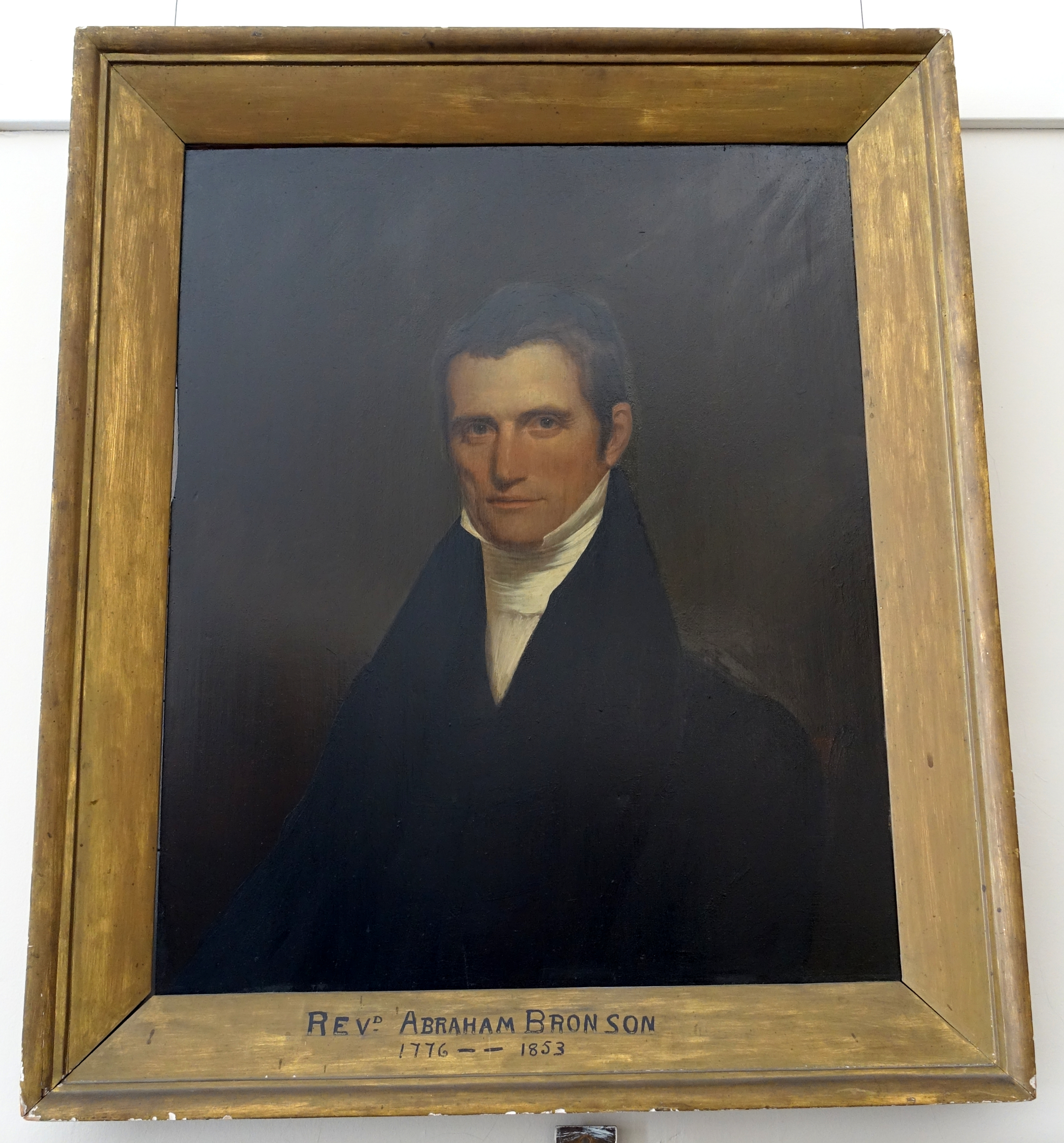
Rev. Abraham Bronson, 1776-1853

The Reverend Abraham Bronson (April 11, 1778 - June 12, 1853) was an Episcopalian minister. He was born in Waterbury, Connecticut, moved as minister to Arlington, Vermont in 1802, where he officiated half-time from 1802 to 1825, and then full-time until 1833 when he left the diocese. He received an honorary A.M. degree from Columbia University in 1809, served as a trustee of Middlebury College, from which he received an honorary degree in 1817, and is recorded as being a member of the American Temperance Society, from Manchester, Vermont, in 1832. At some time in the 1830s, he moved to Peninsula, Ohio, where he became the first minister for the Bronson Church, which was founded and built by his brother Hermon Bronson in 1839. He is buried in Cedar Grove Cemetery in Peninsulao.

== Selected works ==
- The glory of the gospel, published 1831
- Lucubrations, sermons upon sermons, published 1883
- "Memento to youth, a sermon", delivered at the West Church in Arlington at the funeral of Miss Polly Miner, who departed this life, June 6, 1808, in the 21st year of her age
- "A sermon delivered in Arlington, Vt. on Sunday, June 14, 1811", being the second Sunday after the first visitation of the Rt. Rev. Alexander V. Griswold, D.D. Bishop of the Eastern Diocese.
