= The Fight for Privacy =

2022 book by Danielle Citron

- Author: Danielle Citron
- Language: English
- Subject: Privacy, information privacy, civil rights
- Publisher: W. W. Norton & Company
- Publication date: 2022
- Publication place: United States
- Pages: 304
- ISBN: 978-0-393-88231-5

The Fight for Privacy: Protecting Dignity, Identity, and Love in the Digital Age is a 2022 non-fiction book by American legal scholar Danielle Citron. It was published by W. W. Norton & Company. The book looks at privacy in digital life. It focuses on personal information about the body, health, sexuality and close relationships.

== Reception ==
Publishers Weekly described the book as a persuasive case for stronger legal protection of private information. The review also discussed Citron's use of case studies and her proposals for legal reform. Kirkus Reviews called the book an informed argument for stronger protection of private life. The review discussed Citron's proposals on civil rights law, criminal law and technology companies. Stanford Social Innovation Review review wrote that Citron treats privacy as more than the protection of personal data. The review said the book places greater attention on the private parts of a person's life.

Legal scholar Aziz Z. Huq reviewed the book in the Michigan Law Review. He discussed Citron's account of harm caused by the misuse of intimate material. He also questioned whether intimate privacy forms a clear legal category. Huq argued that legal reform alone may not address every problem created by digital technology and data markets.

== Synopsis ==
Citron uses the term intimate privacy for information about a persons private life. This includes the body. It also includes health sexuality gender and relationships.

The book looks at how personal information can be collected, shared and misused. It covers digital surveillance, cyberstalking and the sharing of intimate images without consent. It also looks at deepfakes and the commercial use of personal data.
