= North End (Waterbury) =

Coordinates: 41.603°N 73.023°W

The North End is a neighborhood/section of the city of Waterbury, Connecticut. It is just north of the city's downtown district and contains its own commercial facilities, schools and municipalities. The North End is one of Waterbury's oldest neighborhoods and self-sustaining.

== Demographics ==
Connecticut has the most residents with Italian descent in the United States, with Waterbury having the largest Italian population statewide. Historically, the North End has been one of Waterbury's most heavily populated Italian neighborhoods/sections, together with Town Plot. Many Italian businesses, restaurants, delis and families were established in the area as well as St. Lucy's School, which was one of the only Italian speaking schools in the USA. In the present day it is home to the Pontelandolfo Community Club, named after the Italian town of "Pontelandolfo". Many events are centered on "The Ponte Club" including a week long festival in August which draws crowds from as far away as Philadelphia and Montreal. The community is active and involved in the well-being of the neighborhood as a whole.

Within the last 40 years the North End has become home to a large African American and Hispanic population. Most of the Hispanic residents hail from Puerto Rico or the Dominican Republic. There is also a growing number of Jamaican residents in the area.

== Education ==
There are 4 schools in the city's North End. That includes Waterbury Career Academy (high school) and Jonathan Reed Elementary, both new construction - a sign of economic growth in a neighborhood which recently has had its economic struggles.

== Infrastructure ==
The North End is compiled of multi-family homes, apartment buildings and condo complexes. The area is densely populated though there are single family dwellings as well. There are parks and athletic fields that become a center for neighborhood gatherings and are also utilized by the North End Recreation Center.

== Municipalities ==
The Waterbury Police Department has its PAL headquarters in the North End and is one of the founding PAL leagues in the country. The complex contains mix-use buildings and athletic facilities. The North End also has one of Waterbury's largest fire houses, which can allow the neighborhood to be self-sustaining.

| Apparatus | Fire House |
|---|---|
| Engine 1 | North End |
| Truck 2 | North End |
| Haz-Mat 9 | North End |
| Decon. Unit | North End |
| Collapse 9 | North End |
