= Catchafire =

American volunteering organization

- Company type: Private
- Founded: April 21, 2009; 17 years ago
- Headquarters: New York City, New York
- Founder: Rachael Chong
- Website: catchafire.org

Catchafire is a New York-based organization which makes skill-based connections between professional volunteers and other non-profits. It was founded in 2009 by Rachael Chong. Catchafire matches professionals who want to donate their time with nonprofits who need their skills.

Volunteers with any of a wide variety of skills can browse Catchafire to find short-term projects which match their specific talents. Catchafire has been explicitly compared with matchmaking or dating websites.

Chong has said she was inspired to start Catchafire by her experience volunteering for a housebuilding project in The Bronx, which left her financial and banking skills "untapped," requiring her instead to haul lumber around a building site. "We're matching what people do in their day-to-day lives with the opportunity to apply those amazing skills to a non-profit that truly needs it," she has said.

== See also ==
- Skills-based volunteering
- Social entrepreneurship
