= South End (Waterbury) =

Coordinates: 41.563783°N 73.006362°W

The South End is a neighborhood/section of the city of Waterbury. It lies southeast of I-84, just south of the downtown district. The section has its own schools, parks and commercial facilities. As it is with other sections/neighborhoods in Waterbury, its distinctive character, shaped by the history and geography of the city, has led residents to form an unusual loyalty to their neighborhood.

== Demographics ==
The South End was home to some of the city’s most densely occupied housing and one of the most diverse mixtures of immigrant traditions. The South End was largely the home of Waterbury's French-Canadian immigrants. The neighborhood erected St. Anne's Church, one of Waterbury's largest churches and one of Connecticut's only French-Canadian speaking congregations. The area also contains a large Latin American community which embraces their identity of the South End.

Population

The South End makes up roughly 43,721 of Waterbury's 110,189 population. Of that number, 21,224 are males and 22,497 are female. There are approximately 17,173 homes in the South End.

== Economy ==
The South End has had its fair share of economic downfalls. Blighted buildings and abandoned factories make up a significant portion of the once self-sustaining neighborhood. There is hope as numerous community development and work force teams have set up offices in the South End to turn around decades of distress and hardships.

== Education ==
The section is home to a number of smaller, urban community schools mixing public and private. There are initiatives in the neighborhood to revamp the area's school system with new facilities built on existing lands.

== Landmarks ==
=== St. Anne's Roman Catholic Church ===
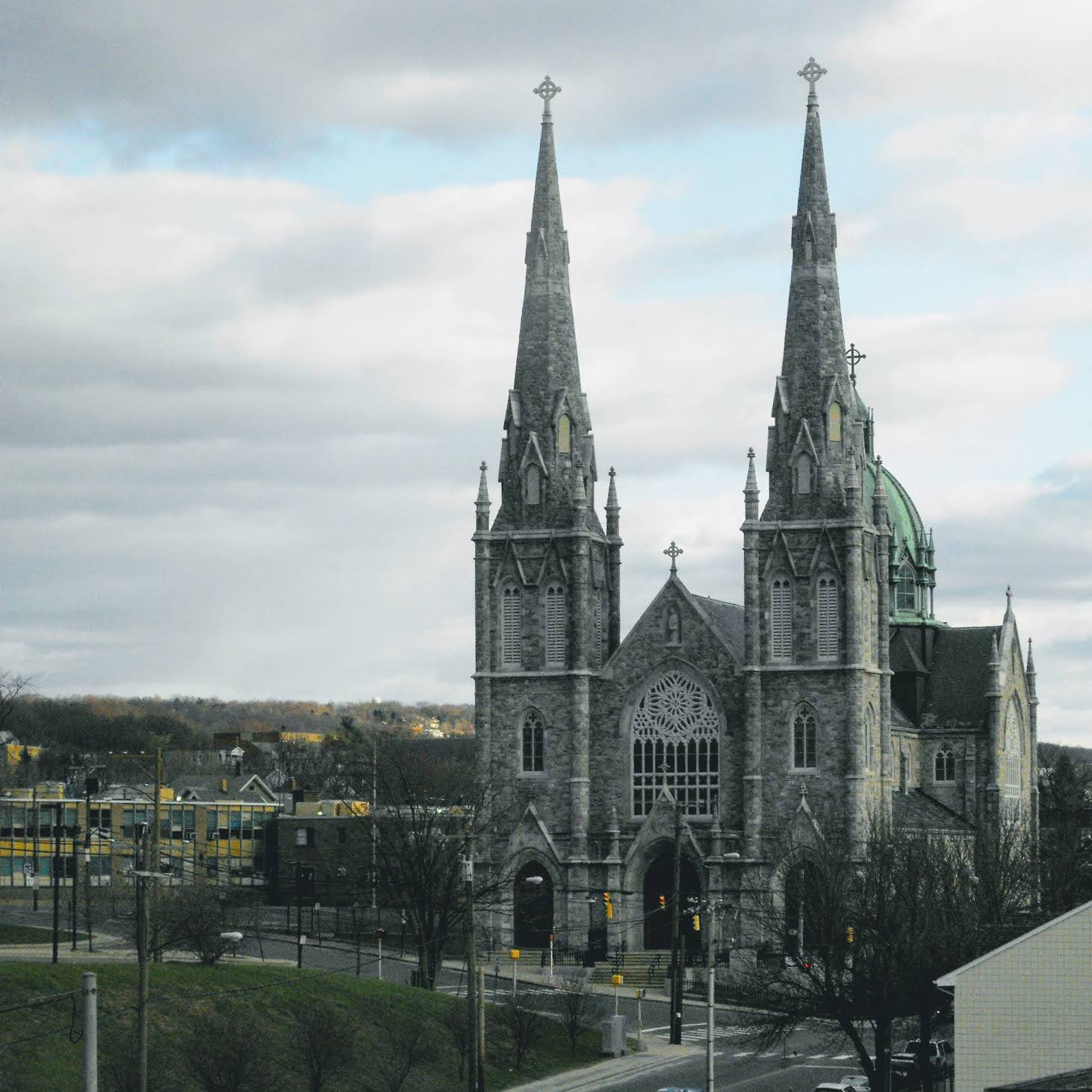
St. Anne's Church

Designed by Boston architects Chickering & O'Connell in French Gothic revival style, the church was dedicated on December 17, 1922, dedicated by Bishop John J. Nilan, of the Diocese of Hartford. It was built by the Granite Construction Company of Fall River, Massachusetts. The structure is steel, overlaid with brick and faced in stone. The base is granite, with the stone above Vermont blue marble. The church has two 100-foot-tall spires, a rose window over the entrance and a copper-topped dome above the altar. Master restorer John Canning noted that the church has a very sophisticated feminine scheme, befitting the patron of the church.
