= Danielle Citron =

American law professor

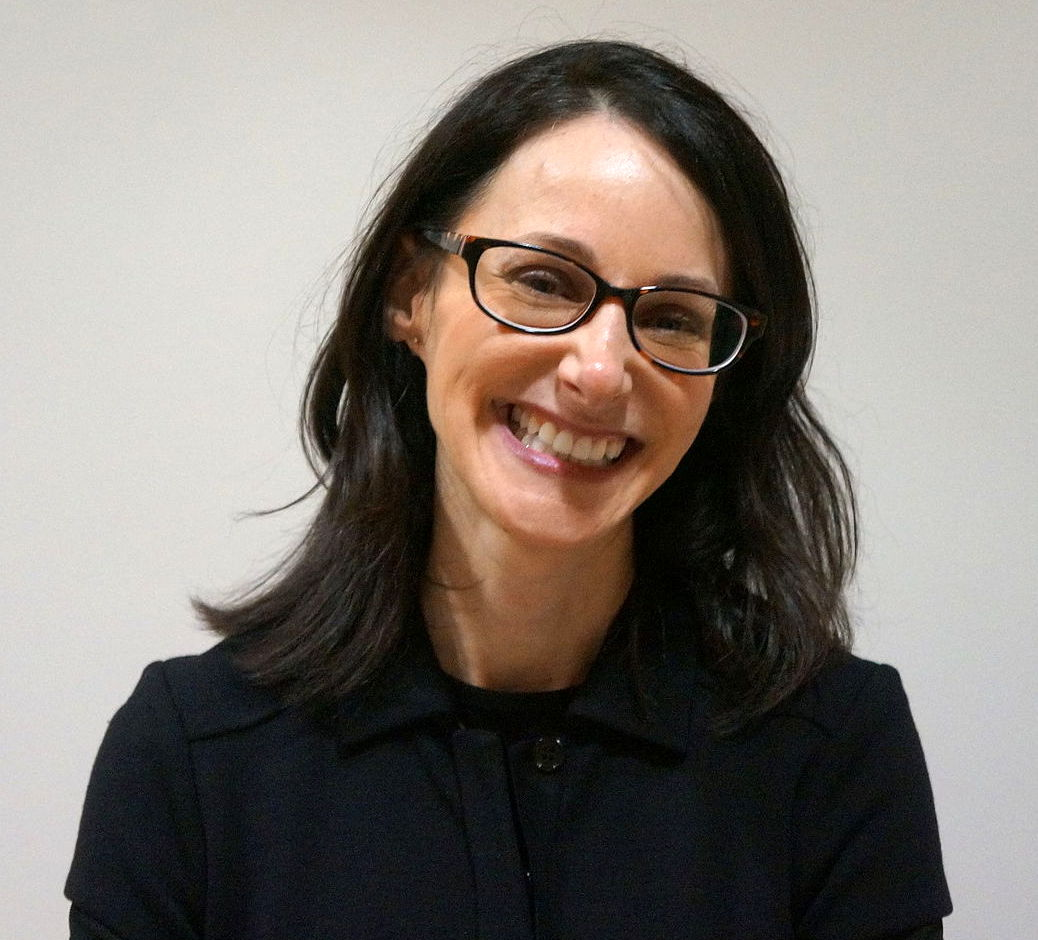
- Citron at WikiConference USA in 2015
- Awards: MacArthur Fellow (2019)

Academic background
- Education: Duke University (BA); Fordham University (JD)

Academic work
- Institutions: University of Virginia School of Law
- Main interests: Privacy, Civil Rights, Gender and the Law
- Notable works: "'Hate Crimes in Cyberspace" (2014) "The Fight for Privacy: Protecting Dignity, Identity, and Love in the Digital Age" (2022)

Danielle Keats Citron is an American legal scholar who is Jefferson Scholars Foundation Schenck Distinguished Professor in Law at the University of Virginia School of Law, where she teaches information privacy, free expression, and civil rights law. Citron is the author of "The Fight for Privacy: Protecting Dignity, Identity, and Love in the Digital Age" (2022) and "Hate Crimes in Cyberspace" (2014). She also serves as Vice President and Secretary of the Cyber Civil Rights Initiative, an organization that provides assistance and legislative support to victims of image-based sexual abuse and other forms of online abuse. Prior to joining UVA Law, Citron was an Austin B. Fletcher Distinguished Professor of Law at Boston University Law School, and was also the Morton & Sophia Macht Professor of Law at the University of Maryland School of Law.

== Biography ==
Citron graduated from Duke University, and the Fordham University School of Law.

Citron is a board member of the Anti-Defamation League's ADL Center for Technology & Society and a member of the Anti-Defamation League's ADL Task Force on Hate Speech & Journalism. She is an Affiliate Scholar at the Stanford Center for Internet and Society, an Affiliate Fellow at the Yale Information Society Project, a Tech Fellow at NYU's Policing Project, and a member of the Principles Group for the Harvard-MIT Artificial Intelligence (AI) Fund.

Citron is the author of Hate Crimes in Cyberspace (2014) which was named one of the “20 Best Moments for Women in 2014” by Cosmopolitan magazine. Her second book The Fight for Privacy: Protecting Dignity, Identity, and Love in the Digital Age will be released in October 2022.

In 2017, she was elected as a member of the American Law Institute and currently serves on the Advisory Board of ALI's Information Privacy Principles Project. She is the Vice President and Board Member of the Cyber Civil Rights Initiative, a civil rights and civil liberties project named after her article Cyber Civil Rights (Boston U Law Review, 2009). She serves on the advisory board of Teach Privacy and Without My Consent. She serves on Twitter's Trust and Safety Council, and the Board of Directors for the Future of Privacy Forum. She sits on the Electronic Privacy Information Center's Board of Directors, and was the Chair of the Board from 2017 through 2019. In 2019, Citron was awarded a MacArthur Fellowship for her work in cyber harassment.

Citron is an expert on online harassment, and has written for The New York Times, Slate, The Atlantic, The New Scientist, Time, and Al Jazeera. She has been a guest on The Diane Rehm Show, The Kojo Nnamdi Show, and Slate's The Gist podcast. She is also a Forbes contributor. She has authored over 50 law review articles, and she is ranked number 72 out of the 250 most-cited scholars on Hein Online.

Citron helped Maryland State Senator Jon Cardin draft a bill criminalizing the non-consensual publication of nude images, which was passed into law in 2014. From 2014 to December 2016, Citron served as an advisor to Vice President Kamala Harris (then California Attorney General). She served as a member of Harris's Task Force to Combat Cyber Exploitation and Violence Against Women.

Citron is a critic of Section 230 of the Communications Decency Act, stating that it gives online platforms a "free pass" from having to do moderation, while market forces are driving a rise of "salacious, negative, and novel content" on the Internet. In a 2017 Fordham Law Review article with Benjamin Wittes, Citron argued that "the internet will not break [from] denying bad samaritans § 230 immunity". At a House Intelligence Committee hearing in June 2019 and at a House Energy and Commerce Committee hearing in October 2019, Citron proposed the conditioning of Section 230 protection on "reasonable" content moderation practices. The Electronic Frontier Foundation called this proposition "terrifying", arguing it would lead to excessive litigation risks, especially for small businesses. On the other hand, Citron has expressed partial agreement with critics of the 2018 FOSTA act, in particular with regard to uncertainties resulting from the law's "knowing facilitation" standard.

== Books ==
- Danielle Keats Citron (2022). The Fight for Privacy: Protecting Dignity, Identity and Love in our Digital Age. Chatto & Windus. ISBN 9781784744847
- Danielle Keats Citron (2014). Hate Crimes in Cyberspace. Harvard University Press. ISBN 978-0-674-36829-3.

== Awards ==
- 2024 International Association of Privacy Professionals Leadership Award
- 2019 MacArthur Fellow
- Fastcase 50 2022 Honoree
- UMB 2018 Champion of Excellence
- 2018 Privacy for Policymakers Best Paper Award for "Sexual Privacy"
- 2016 Privacy for Policymakers Best Paper Award for "The Privacy Policymaking of State Attorneys General" and "Risk and Anxiety: A Theory of Data Breach Harms" (coauthored with Daniel J. Solove)
- Best Paper of 2016, International Association of Privacy Practitioners for "The Privacy Policymaking of State Attorneys General"
- Best Paper of 2014, International Association of Privacy Practitioners for "The Scored Society" (coauthored with Frank Pasquale)
- Top 50 World Thinkers, 2015, Prospect UK magazine (naming 50 "leaders in their fields, engaging in original and profound ways with the central questions of the world today—whether in economics, science, philosophy, religion or feminism. We chose them based on recommendations from our wide pool of writers and editors").
- Top 50 Most Influential Marylanders, 2015, Maryland Daily Record
