= Town Plot Hill =

Neighborhood in Waterbury, Connecticut, U.S.

Coordinates: 41.535°N 73.056°W

Town Plot is a neighborhood in the west end of the city of Waterbury, Connecticut.

== History ==
Situated at the top of the hill, it has historical significance as the original settlement of Waterbury in 1674 before the permanent town was laid out on the east side of the river. This is commemorated with the Harrub Pilgrim Memorial statue at the corner of Highland and Sunnyside Avenues. The continued occupation of the high ridge can be seen in the 19th century farm houses that survive along Highland Avenue.

In the early decades of the 20th century, Town Plot attracted new homeowners seeking more open space than the densely settled, older neighborhoods of Brooklyn and the South End could offer. Civic improvements in the area, including the development of Chase Park in 1911, the construction of Chase Parkway in the 1920s, and the construction of St. Margaret's school in 1927, brought greater public attention and transportation services to the neighborhood.

Many of the new homeowners were Italian families building single family homes, often in proximity to other family members. Many of the homes were built by the owners themselves, with the help of family and friends, with extensive vegetable gardens nearby. The construction of the church and school of Our Lady of Mt. Carmel, in the 1940s and '50s, and its related festivals and activities added to the attraction and vitality of the neighborhood, and served as a center for a close-knit Italian community. Nearly a third of the residents were Italian natives or first generation in Waterbury in 1970.

== Demographics ==
Town Plot is one of several neighborhoods in Waterbury with a strong Italian influence. The neighborhood is home to many Italian restaurants and delis, as well many Italian-American owned businesses. The neighborhood is also home to Our Lady of Mt. Carmel Church. The parish is famous for its popular four-day feast every July which ends with a large parade through the streets of the neighborhood on Sunday. The feast which draws thousands of visitors who come to enjoy homemade food as well as live Italian entertainment. The feast is specifically known for its fried dough, soffritto sandwiches, Italian ice, and pastries.

Population

Town Plot makes up 29,211 of Waterbury's 110,189 population. Of that number, 14,355 are males and 14,856 are female. Town Plot has 11,861 households.

== Municipalities ==
There is a fire station located in the center of Town Plot which serves the neighborhood out of the Highland Avenue fire house.

Town Plot Fire Station

Apparatus	Station
Engine 11	740 Highland Avenue

== Education ==
The following is a list of schools in Town Plot. The area consists of 3 public and 2 private schools, including 2 high schools. In April 2001, President George W. Bush visited B.W. Tinker School and praised the administration at Tinker, an urban school, for significantly improving the students' standardized test scores over the past eight years.

- B.W Tinker Elementary
- West Side Middle School
- Our Lady of Mt. Carmel School
- John F. Kennedy High School
- Holy Cross High School
