= Waterbury, Connecticut =

City in Connecticut, United States

Waterbury
- City
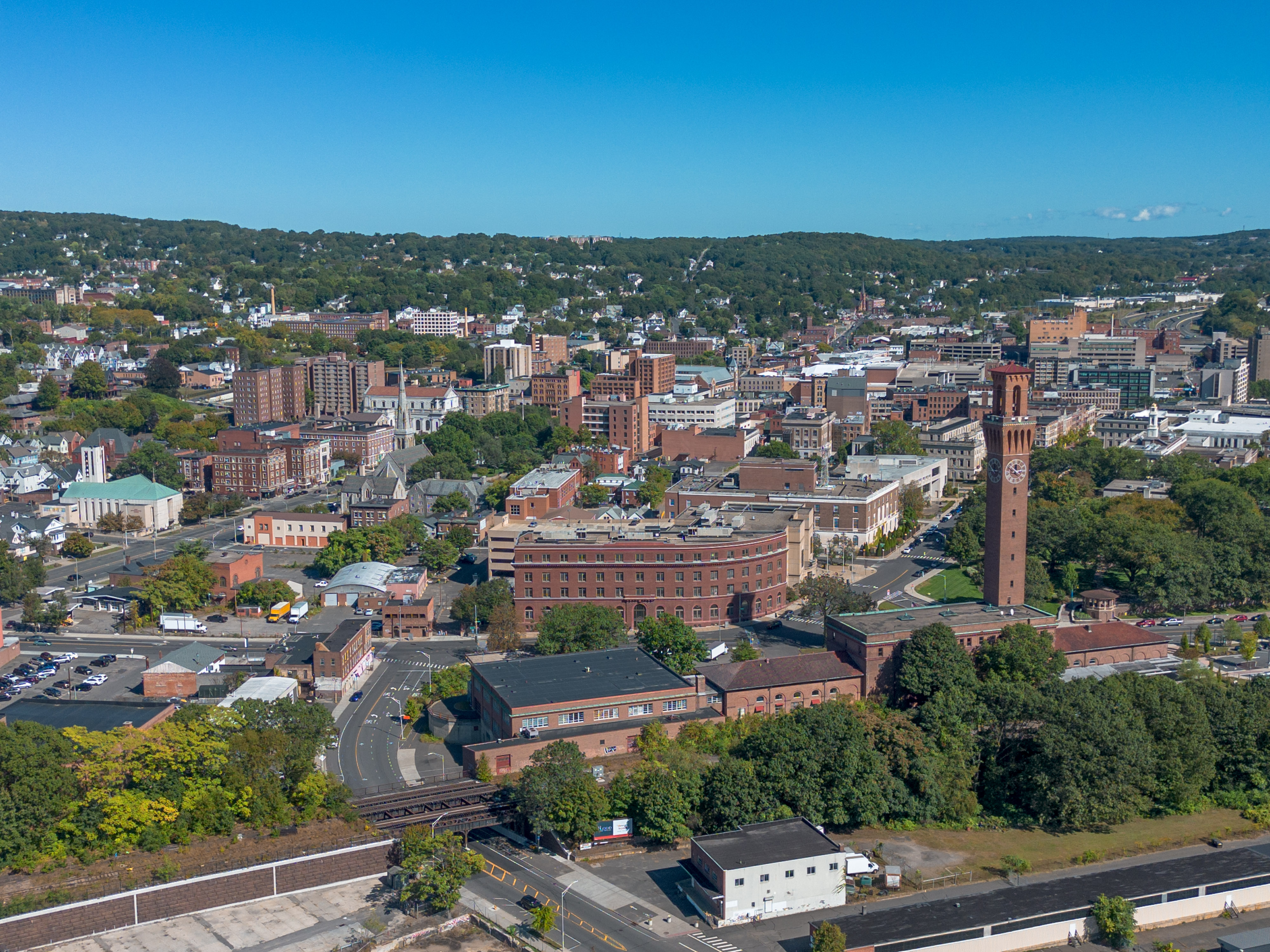
- Waterbury skyline in 2025

- Flag Seal Wordmark
- Nickname: The Brass City
- Motto: Quid Aere Perennius (Latin) "What Is More Lasting Than Brass?"
- Coordinates: 41°33′22″N 73°2′29″W
- Country: United States
- U.S. state: Connecticut
- County: New Haven
- Region: Naugatuck Valley
- Incorporated (town): 1686
- Incorporated (city): 1853
- Consolidated: 1902

Government
  - Type: Mayor–council
  - Mayor: Paul K. Pernerewski Jr. (D)
  - Board of Aldermen: Members: Michael Rinaldi (D); Kenneth Curran (D); Michael Grosso (R); Belinda Weaver (D); Ian Blake (D); Bryan McEntee (R); Sean Mosley (D); John Drewry (D); Kelly Zimmermann (R); Michael DiGiovancarlo (President) (D); Jeffrey Hunter (D); George Noujaim (R); Rafael Feliciano-Roman (D); Sandra Martinez-McCarthy (D); Adrian Sanchez (R)

Area
  - City: 28.95 sq mi (74.97 km^{2})
  - Land: 28.52 sq mi (73.87 km^{2})
  - Water: 0.42 sq mi (1.09 km^{2}) 1.45%
- Elevation: 269 ft (82 m)
- Highest elevation: 820 ft (250 m)
- Lowest elevation: 220 ft (67 m)

Population (2020)
  - City: 114,403 (US: 258th)
  - Estimate (2024): 115,908
  - Density: 6,490/sq mi (2,505.7/km^{2})
  - Urban: 199,317 (US: 195th)
  - Urban density: 2,156.2/sq mi (832.5/km^{2})
  - Metro: 454,083 (US: 118th)
  - Metro density: 1,090/sq mi (420.9/km^{2})
- Time zone: UTC−05:00 (Eastern)
  - Summer (DST): UTC−04:00 (Eastern)
- ZIP Codes: 06701–06720
- Area codes: 203/475
- FIPS code: 09-80000
- GNIS feature ID: 0211851
- Airport: Waterbury–Oxford Airport
- Website: www.waterburyct.org

Waterbury is a city in the U.S. state of Connecticut. Waterbury had a population of 114,403 as of the 2020 Census. The city is 33 miles (53 km) southwest of Hartford and 77 miles (124 km) northeast of New York City. Waterbury is the largest city in the Naugatuck Valley Planning Region and second-largest city in New Haven County.

Throughout the first half of the 20th century, Waterbury had large industrial interests and was the leading center in the United States for the manufacture of brassware (including castings and finishings), as reflected in the nickname the "Brass City" and the city's motto, Quid Aere Perennius? ("What Is More Lasting Than Brass?"). It was also noted for the manufacture of watches and clocks (Timex).

The city is alongside Interstate 84 (Yankee Expressway) and Route 8 and has a Metro-North railroad station with connections to Grand Central Terminal. Waterbury is also home to Post University and the regional campuses of the University of Connecticut, University of Bridgeport, and Western Connecticut State University, as well as Naugatuck Valley Community College.

== History ==
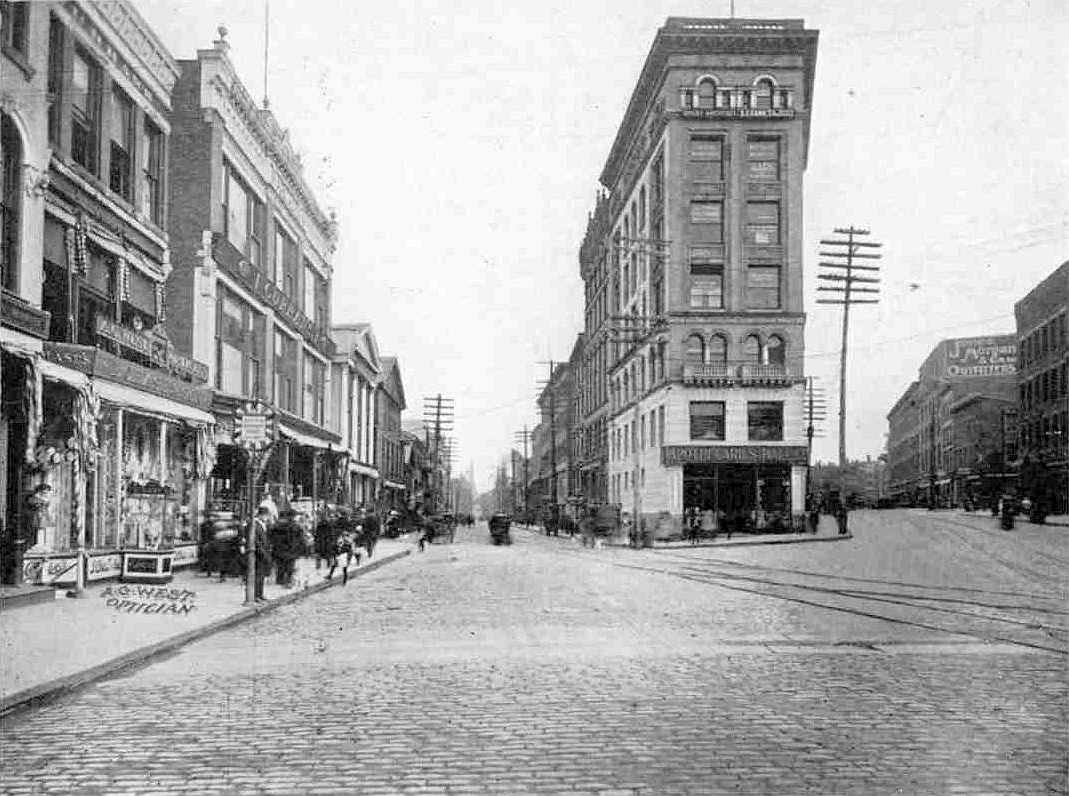
South Main Street, c. 1910

The land was originally inhabited by the Algonquin bands. According to Samuel Orcutt's history, some Puritan residents of nearby Farmington "found it expedient to purchase the same lands from different tribes, without attempting to decide between their rival claims." The original settlement of Waterbury in 1674 was in the area now known as the Town Plot section. In 1675, the turbulence of King Philip's War caused the new settlement to be vacated until the resumption of peace in 1677. A new permanent location was found across the river to the east along the Mad River. The original Native American inhabitants called the area "Matetacoke" meaning "the interval lands." Thus, the settlement's name was Anglicized to "Mattatuck" in 1673. When the settlement was admitted as the 28th town in the Connecticut Colony in 1686, the name was changed to Waterbury in reference to the numerous streams that emptied into the Naugatuck River from the hills on either side of the valley. At that time, it included all or parts of what later became the towns of Watertown, Plymouth, Wolcott, Prospect, Naugatuck, Thomaston, and Middlebury.

Growth was slow during Waterbury's first hundred years. The lack of arable land due to the constant flooding of the Naugatuck River in particular, discouraged many potential settlers. Furthermore, the residents suffered through a great flood in 1691 and an outbreak of disease in 1712. After a century, Waterbury's population numbered just 5,000.

Waterbury emerged as an early American industrial power in the 19th century when the city began to manufacture brass, harnessing the waters of the Mad River and Naugatuck River to power the early factories. The new brass industry attracted many immigrant laborers from all over the world, leading to an influx of diverse nationalities. Waterbury was incorporated as a city in 1853 and, as the "Brass Capital of the World", it gained a reputation for the quality and durability of its goods. Brass and copper supplied by Waterbury were used in Nevada's Boulder Dam among myriad applications across the United States.

A famous Waterbury product of the late-19th century was Robert H. Ingersoll's one-dollar pocket watch, five million of which were sold. After this, the clock industry became as important as Waterbury's brass industry. Evidence of these industries can still be seen in Waterbury, as numerous clock towers and old brass factories have become landmarks of the city.

Waterbury produced silverware starting in 1858 by Rogers & Brother, and in 1886 by Rogers & Hamilton. In 1893, Rogers & Brother exhibited wares at the World's Columbian Exposition in Chicago. In 1898, both companies became part of the International Silver Company, headquartered in nearby Meriden. Production continued at the Rogers & Brother site until 1938. Designs of the two companies are in the collections of the Mattatuck Museum in Waterbury, the Brooklyn Museum in New York, the Yale University Art Gallery in New Haven, and in many historical societies and museums across the United States.

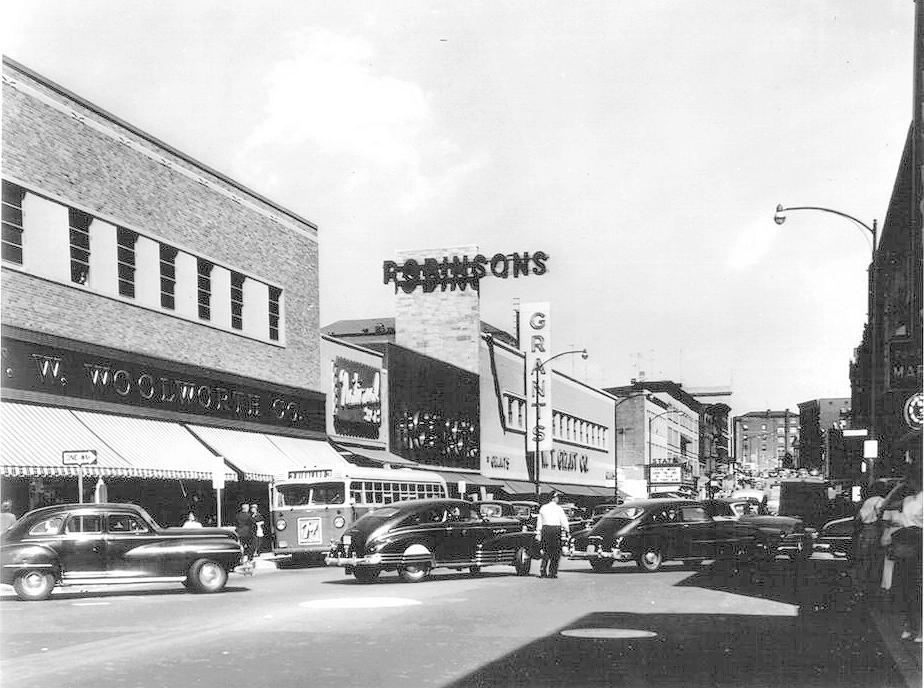
East Main Street, 1954

In June 1920, labor unrest occurred, with striking workers fighting with police on the street. Over 30 were arrested, mostly Lithuanians, Russians, Poles, and Italians. The strikers numbered some 15,000, with most being employed at Scovill, Chase Rolling Mill, and Chase Metal Works. One striker was shot to death by police.

At its peak during World War II, 10,000 people worked at the Scovill Manufacturing Co, later sold to Century Brass. The city's metal manufacturing mills (Scovill Manufacturing, Anaconda American Brass, and Chase Brass & Copper were the largest) occupied more than 2 million square feet (180,000 m^{2}) and more than 90 buildings.

On May 24, 1962, the north side of the city was devastated by a high-end F3 tornado that caused widespread damage, destroyed numerous neighborhoods, and left one dead and 50 injured. Damage from the storm was estimated to be at least $5 million.

=== Historic events ===
- Waterbury Land Company was formed in 1807, for the purpose of settling a Connecticut Western Reserve Township named Columbia in Lorain County, Ohio. The draft allotment was purchased for $21,600.
- Waterbury's Fr. Michael J. McGivney founded the Knights of Columbus in New Haven, Connecticut, on February 2, 1882. Though the first councils were in Connecticut, the Order spread throughout the United States.
- Established in 1894, St. Joseph's Church holds the distinction of being the first Lithuanian worshiping community in Connecticut and second oldest in the country.
- The first Unico Club was founded in Waterbury in 1922 by Dr. Anthony P. Vastola. It grew to 8,000 members and 150 regional groups. The membership is composed of business and professional people of Italian lineage or those who are married to an Italian-American. The clubs sponsor educational, cultural and civic programs.
- Sacred Heart was the first Catholic high school in Connecticut, September 6, 1922.
- One of the first full-length sound motion pictures was made in the 1920s at the studios of the Bristol Co. at Platts Mills by Professor William Henry Bristol, who experimented for years with sound pictures.
- The Waterbury Clock Company produced the Mickey Mouse watch in 1933 under the Ingersoll brand. The watch was so popular that over 11,000 were sold the first day, and it saved the company from bankruptcy.
- W1XBS in Waterbury was one of four radio stations in the country that began experimental high fidelity broadcasting in 1934. The station broadcast at 1530 kHz, and joined the CBS Radio Network on December 1, 1938. They moved to 1590 kHz in 1941, in accordance with the North American Regional Broadcasting Agreement. The station's broadcasting license was cancelled in 1998 to allow New York's WWRL to be upgraded after that station purchased it; at the time it had been known as WQQW.
- Victor Zembruski started his Polish Eagles show on Waterbury radio station WATR in 1934. As of 2010 called The Zembruski Family Polka Hour, it is one of the oldest continuously broadcast shows on American radio. The show aired its last episode on May 31, 2020.
- The Chase Dispensary, a medical clinic for employees of the Chase Brass & Copper Co., opened one of the first birth control clinics in the country in 1938.
- On July 5, 1982, 30-year-old Israel Madera-Flores, set fire to an apartment building in anger, after being kicked out for being drunk. The fire killed 14 people, 7 of the victims being children. He was convicted of all 14 murders, and sentenced to 120 years in prison without parole. It is the worst fire in the city’s history.

== Geography ==
According to the United States Census Bureau, the city has a total area of 29.0 square miles (75.0 km^{2}), of which 28.5 square miles (73.9 km^{2}) is land and 0.42 square miles (1.1 km^{2}), or 1.46%, is water.

Waterbury lies in the humid continental climate zone, and normally sees cold, snowy winters and warm, humid summers.

Climate data for Waterbury, Connecticut
Month	Jan	Feb	Mar	Apr	May	Jun	Jul	Aug	Sep	Oct	Nov	Dec	Year
Mean daily maximum °F (°C)	35 (2)	39 (4)	47 (8)	59 (15)	70 (21)	78 (26)	83 (28)	81 (27)	74 (23)	63 (17)	52 (11)	41 (5)	60 (16)
Mean daily minimum °F (°C)	15 (−9)	18 (−8)	26 (−3)	36 (2)	46 (8)	58 (14)	62 (17)	60 (16)	51 (11)	39 (4)	31 (−1)	22 (−6)	39 (4)
Average precipitation inches (mm)	3.64 (92)	3.61 (92)	4.38 (111)	4.52 (115)	4.64 (118)	4.74 (120)	4.59 (117)	4.78 (121)	4.84 (123)	5.18 (132)	4.41 (112)	4.24 (108)	53.57 (1,361)

=== Neighborhoods ===
Waterbury's neighborhoods are shaped by the history and geography of the city.

Ethnic communities distinguish the city's 25 neighborhoods. Clusters of shops at the street corners created villages within the city. For many people, home, work and community life were contained within their neighborhood. Downtown, a short walk away, was "the city", offering live theater, fancy stores, parades and spectacles.

- Brooklyn
- Bucks Hill
- Bunker Hill
- Country Club
- Crownbrook
- Downtown
- East End
- East Mountain
- Fair Lawn
- Fairmount
- Gilmartin
- Hillside
- Hopeville
- Long Hill
- North End
- North Square
- Overlook
- Pine Hill
- Robinwood
- South End
- Town Plot
- Washington Hill
- Waterville
- West Side
- WOW / Walnut-Orange-Walsh

== Demographics ==
Historical population
Census	Pop.	Note	%±
1860	10,004		—
1870	10,826		8.2%
1880	17,806		64.5%
1890	28,646		60.9%
1900	45,859		60.1%
1910	73,141		59.5%
1920	91,715		25.4%
1930	99,902		8.9%
1940	99,314		−0.6%
1950	104,477		5.2%
1960	107,130		2.5%
1970	108,033		0.8%
1980	103,266		−4.4%
1990	108,961		5.5%
2000	107,271		−1.6%
2010	110,366		2.9%
2020	114,403		3.7%
2024 (est.)	115,908	▲	1.3%
U.S. Decennial Census; 2020 Census

Waterbury, Connecticut – Racial and ethnic composition Note: the US Census treats Hispanic/Latino as an ethnic category. This table excludes Latinos from the racial categories and assigns them to a separate category. Hispanics/Latinos may be of any race.
Race / ethnicity (NH = Non-Hispanic)	Pop 2000	Pop 2010	Pop 2020	% 2000	% 2010	% 2020
White alone (NH)	62,406	50,081	37,760	58.18%	45.38%	33.01%
Black or African-American alone (NH)	16,335	19,654	22,269	15.23%	17.81%	19.47%
Native American or Alaska Native alone (NH)	319	313	307	0.30%	0.28%	0.27%
Asian alone (NH)	1,584	1,933	2,349	1.48%	1.75%	2.05%
Pacific Islander alone (NH)	43	26	32	0.04%	0.02%	0.03%
Some other race alone (NH)	655	1,226	1,798	0.61%	1.11%	1.57%
Mixed-race or multi-racial (NH)	2,575	2,687	4,607	2.40%	2.43%	4.03%
Hispanic or Latino (any race)	23,354	34,446	45,281	21.77%	31.21%	39.58%
Total	107,271	110,366	114,403	100.00%	100.00%	100.00%

As of the census of 2010, there were 110,366 people, 42,761 households, and 26,996 families residing in the city. The population density was 3,866 inhabitants per square mile (1,493/km^{2}). There were 42,761 housing units at an average density of 1,492.0 per square mile. The racial makeup of the city was 58.8% White, 20.1% Black or African-American, 0.6% Native American, 1.8% Asian, 0.1% Pacific Islander, 14.2% from other races, and 4.6% from two or more races. Hispanic or Latino people of any race were 31.2% of the population.

Waterbury has a large Italian-American population with 21.46% of its residents claiming Italian heritage. The Italian influence is especially strong in the Town Plot, Brooklyn, and North End neighborhoods. Additionally, the city is home to thriving Albanian, Cape Verdean, Brazilian, Portuguese, and Lithuanian communities. Waterbury also has a large Irish community, especially in the Washington Hill section which is home to the city's annual St. Patrick Day's Parade, which, oddly enough, is rarely held on St. Patrick's Day itself. At the beginning of the 21st century, Waterbury had a growing Orthodox Jewish population. Waterbury had a significant Jewish population beginning in the late 1800s, initially as a result of German immigration. The first synagogue in Waterbury opened in 1872. In the early 20th century, almost 9,000 Jews immigrated from Eastern Europe, with many fleeing persecution. The Orthodox Jewish community has experienced a renaissance since 2000 due to efforts by educators and developers to create an affordable alternative to the high cost of living in established Orthodox communities in New York and New Jersey. This renaissance began with the founding of the Yeshiva K'tana of Waterbury in 2000; as of 2014, this full-service elementary and middle school has nearly 400 students. Other educational institutions are the Yeshiva Gedolah of Waterbury, which includes a mesivta high school and beit medrash (undergraduate) program for approximately 230 students, a Bais Yaakov school for girls, and a kolel. As of the end of 2014, the Waterbury Orthodox community numbers 180 families and includes a mikveh, eruv, and community services such as Hatzalah and Chaverim.

There were 42,622 households, out of which 31.2% had children under the age of 18 living with them, 34.7% were married couples living together, 28.4% had a single householder with no husband present, and 36.9% were non-families. 31.4% of all households were made up of individuals, and 12.1% had someone living alone who was 65 years of age or older. The average household size was 2.46 and the average family size was 3.11.

In the city, the population was spread out, with 25.6% under the age of 18, 10.1% from 18 to 24, 27.4% from 25 to 44, 24.3% from 45 to 64, and 12.6% who were 65 years of age or older. The median age was 35.2 years. For every 100 females, there were 89.9 males. For every 100 females age 18 and over, there were 85.8 males.

According to the 2014 5-year American Community Survey (conducted 2010–2014, data released December 3, 2015), the median income for a household in the city was $41,136, compared to $69,899 statewide. In Waterbury, 24.2% of the population, or 26,122 residents of the city, lived below the poverty line, compared to 10.5% statewide. In Waterbury, 36.8% of the child population age 0–17, or 9,984 children in the city, lived below the poverty line, compared to 14% statewide.

== Economy ==
Waterbury's economic decline in the 1970s and 1980s resulted in it being ranked as having the worst quality of life of 300 U.S. metropolitan areas by Money Magazine in 1992. Waterbury was also rated as one of the "Worst Places for Businesses and Careers in America" by Forbes Magazine in April 2008. Nevertheless, the city was named on the 100 Best Places to Raise a Family list in the same year.

According to the city's 2024 Comprehensive Annual Financial Report, the top employers in the city are:

#	Employer	# of employees
1	City of Waterbury	4,081
2	Waterbury Hospital	2,115
3	Post University	2,100
4	Saint Mary's Hospital	1,382
5	Naugatuck Valley Community College	721
6	Stop & Shop	355
7	Dunkin' Donuts	341
8	YMCA	284
T-9	New Opportunities of Waterbury	273
T-9	Costco	273

== Arts and culture ==
=== Landmarks ===
- Union Station, opened in 1909
- Holy Land USA, a park with an illuminated cross on a hill, one of Connecticut's most popular tourist attractions in the 1960s and 1970s
- Municipal Stadium, built in 1930
- The Apothecary Building, built in 1893
- A statue on the Carrie Welton Fountain
- Soldiers' Monument, sculpted by Waterbury resident George Edwin Bissell as a tribute to the American Civil War
- Elton Hotel, built in 1905
- The Cass Gilbert National Register District, founded after architect Cass Gilbert won a competition to design Waterbury's City Hall or Waterbury Municipal Center Complex
- The statue of Christopher Columbus, by sculptor Frank Gaylord (1984)
- The Ben Franklin statue (1921), by sculptor Paul Wayland Bartlett, a Waterbury resident
- Waterbury Courthouse, the former headquarters of the Anaconda American Brass Company
- The Waterbury Clock Company buildings, constructed in 1857. By the end of the 19th century, the company employed 3,000 workers and manufactured 20,000 clocks and watches per day. During World War II, it was the largest producer of fuse timers for precision defense products in the United States.
- The Harrub Pilgrim Memorial (1930), by Hermon Atkins MacNeil
- Chief Two Moon Meridas Laboratory, where Two Moon Meridas manufactured herbal medications
- Mattatuck Museum Arts and History Center, dedicated to collecting and exhibiting Connecticut artists and sculptors
- Brass Mill Center, a shopping venue
- The Palace Theatre (1922)
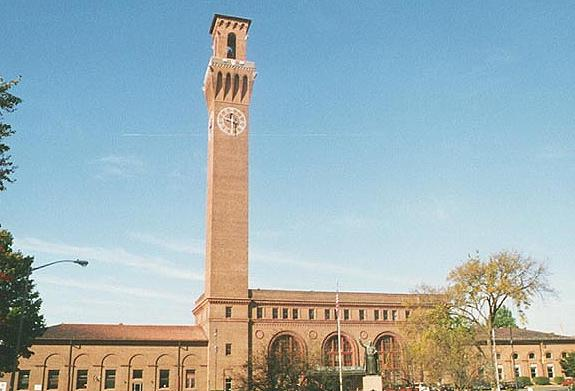
Union Station clock tower

Hotel Elton, 1940s

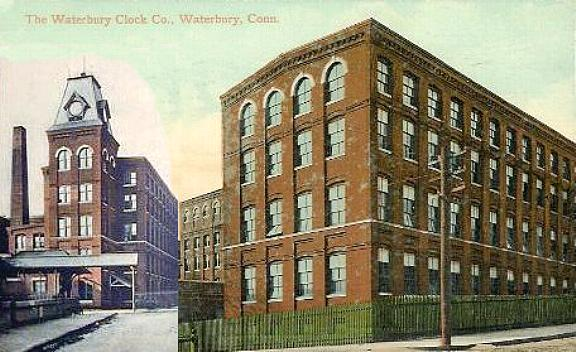
Waterbury Clock Company buildings

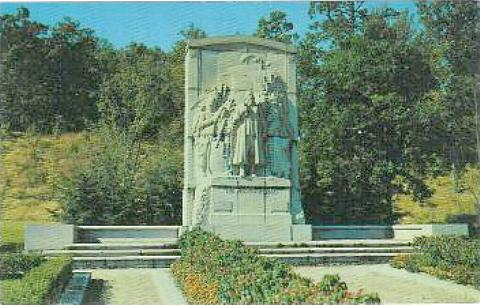
Harrub Pilgrim Memorial

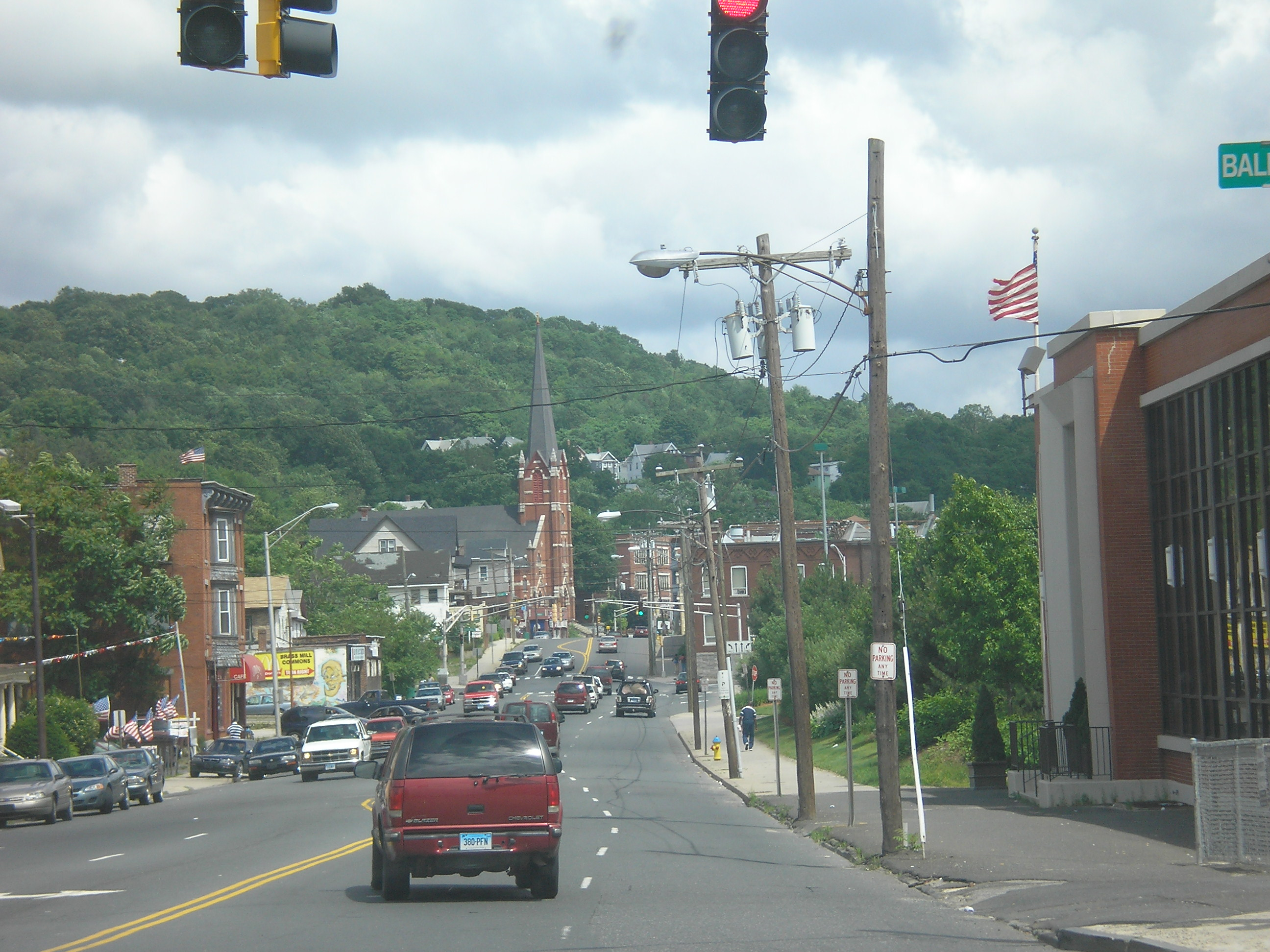
View of East Main Street with Sacred Heart Church in the center

== Government ==
Mayor	Paul K. Pernerewski, Jr. (D)
Town clerk	Antoinette C. Spinelli (D)
City sheriff	Stephen M. Conway (D)
City clerk	Michael J. Dalton (D)

Aldermen (15)
Michael DiGiovancarlo (D – President) 4th District
Christian D'Orso (D – Majority Leader) 1st District
Sandra Martinez-McCarthy (D – President Pro Tempore) 5th District
Michael Rinaldi (D) 1st District
Belinda Weaver (D) 2nd District
Victor Lopez, Jr. (D) 2nd District
Michael Salvio (D) 3rd District
Sean Mosley (D) 3rd District
Jeff Hunter (D) 4th District
Bilal Tajildeen (D) 5th District
Ruben Rodriguez (R - Minority Leader) 2nd District
Mary Grace Cavallo (R) 1st District
Kelly Zimmermann (R) 3rd District
George Noujaim (R) 4thDistrict
John F. Alseph, Jr. (R) 5th District

Waterbury has about 52,000 registered voters, of whom about 24,000 are Democrats. There are about 7,800 registered Republicans and the balance are largely unaffiliated, with a smattering belonging to minor parties.

John S. Monagan, who was a prolific author in addition to his political responsibilities, served as Waterbury's mayor from 1943 to 1948. He also served as its district's congressional representative from 1959 to 1973. George Harlamon, a member of the Waterbury Hall of Fame, was the city's 40th mayor. He served from 1969 to 1970 during a period of racial tension. The city is known for its hard-nosed political culture compared locally to Cook County, Illinois, close elections, and a number of scandals.

Waterbury's scandalous past dates back to 1940, when Mayor T. Frank Hayes and 22 others were convicted of conspiracy to defraud the City of Waterbury. Hayes received a 10–15 year sentence and served six years. Ironically, the massive corruption scheme was exposed with the help of then comptroller Sherwood Rowland, grandfather of Gov. John G. Rowland, who was convicted on corruption charges in 2004. What appeared to have been a defeat for Hayes was not really a victory for Pape, and the stage was set for further corruption in Waterbury in the second half of the 20th century. Waterbury was in serious financial straits due to years of mismanagement, resulting in the city's finances being taken over by the State of Connecticut. The State Oversight Board oversaw city business for several years and has since left following consecutive years of balanced budgets. In 1992 former Mayor Joseph Santopietro was sentenced to nine years in prison following a public corruption conviction. The successors to Philip Giordano, former acting mayor Sam Caligiuri (2001) and former mayor Michael Jarjura (2001–2011) managed the city without major controversy since 2001. Democrat Neil O'Leary was elected the 46th mayor of Waterbury on November 9, 2011.

In 1939, Pape backed an attempt to install council-manager government and single-transferable-vote elections. The local Republican Party and Connecticut General Assembly also supported this measure. New York Mayor Fiorello H. La Guardia helped campaign for its passage, having backed similar reforms in his own city in 1936.

A number of presidential candidates have campaigned in Waterbury due to its pivotal role in statewide elections. The most famous was the election eve visit on the Green by John F. Kennedy in 1960. Forty thousand people waited until 3 AM on the Green to greet Kennedy on Sunday, November 6, 1960. Sen. Kennedy spoke to them from the balcony of the Roger Smith Hotel (now called the Elton). Pierre Salinger later said it was the greatest night of the campaign. In September 1984 Ronald Reagan held a huge noontime election rally at the same location. In July 2006 former president Bill Clinton made a campaign appearance at the Palace Theatre for Senator Joe Lieberman during his campaign for re-election to the U.S. Senate. Shortly after the Democratic primary, Tom Swan, campaign manager for Lieberman's opponent Ned Lamont, described Waterbury as a place where "the forces of slime meet the forces of evil," after a large majority of the town's voters backed Lieberman. Swan claimed he was referring to former mayor Philip A. Giordano and former governor John G. Rowland.

Governor John G. Rowland served ten months in a federal prison until February 10, 2006. He was released from federal prison with the stipulation that he serve four months house arrest with an electronic ankle bracelet monitor until June 2006.

In January 2008 Waterbury Mayor Michael Jarjura announced that he would hire Rowland as an economic development advisor for the city. Rowland began work in February that year receiving an annual salary of $95,000 as the city's economic development coordinator funded in conjunction with the Greater Waterbury Chamber of Commerce.

In 2011, the Board of Aldermen voted to eliminate funding for the city's portion of his salary and in November 2011 Rowland stated he would give up his position when his contract expired thus ending his quasi-city employment.

Later that year, following his victory over then Mayor Jarjura, new mayor Neil O'Leary created the position of economic development director as part of his new administration, removing the duties from the Chamber of Commerce and bringing them directly into City Hall, making economic development a cornerstone of his administration. Ron Pugliese was hired as the first director to hold the position.

Voter registration and party enrollment as of October 31, 2024
Party	Active voters	Inactive voters	Total voters	Percentage
Democratic	21,910	2,256	24,166	38.99%
Republican	8,433	576	9,009	14.54%
Unaffiliated	25,000	2,921	27,921	45.05%
Minor parties	782	101	883	1.42%
Total	56,125	5,854	61,979	100%

== Education ==
Waterbury has three high schools, eight secondary schools, and nineteen elementary schools. They all operate under the leadership of a superintendent and a board of education consisting of ten elected members and the city mayor, who acts as chairman ex-officio. Schools include:

=== High schools ===
- Crosby High School
- John F Kennedy High School
- Waterbury Arts Magnet School
- Waterbury Carrer Academy
- Wilby High School

=== Middle schools ===
- North End Middle School
- Wallace Middle School
- Waterbury Arts Magnet School
- West Side Middle School

=== PK–8 schools ===
- Carrington PK–8 School
- Duggan PK–8 School
- Gilmartin PK–8 School
- Reed PK–8 School
- Wendell Cross PK–8 School

=== Elementary schools ===
- B.W. Tinker Elementary School
- Bucks Hill Elementary School
- Bunker Hill Elementary School
- Chase Elementary School
- Driggs Elementary School
- F.J. Kingsbury Elementary School
- Generali Elementary School
- Hopeville Elementary School
- Maloney Interdistrict Magnet School
- Roberto Clemente Dual International School
- Regan Elementary School
- Rotella Interdistrict Magnet School
- Sprague Elementary School
- Walsh Elementary School
- Washington Elementary School
- Woodrow Wilson Elementary School

=== Religious schools ===
- Alpha and Omega Christian Academy
- Catholic Academy of Waterbury (a merge of the closed Blessed Sacrament & St. Mary's Schools)
- Holy Cross High School
- Our Lady of Mt. Carmel School
- Sacred Heart High School (On February 11, 2021, Sacred Heart announced it would be closing at the end of the 2020–2021 school year.)
- Sacred Heart Middle School
- Saint Joseph's School
- Yeshiva Gedolah of Waterbury
- Yeshiva K'tana of Waterbury

=== Colleges and universities ===
- Naugatuck Valley Community College
- Post University
- University of Bridgeport (regional campus)
- University of Connecticut (regional campus/Downtown Waterbury)
- Western Connecticut State University (regional campus)

== Media ==
Two newspapers are operated within Waterbury: the Republican-American, which covers 36 communities throughout Western Connecticut, and the Waterbury Observer. WATR 1320 AM, a radio station under the same family ownership since 1934 and broadcasting on the same frequency since 1939, operates a News/Talk/Classic Hits format and is the only AM radio station broadcasting from within Waterbury. Two FM radio stations are also located in Waterbury: WWYZ 92.5, which plays a country music format and WMRQ 104.1, which plays alternative rock. They both transmit from 10 miles away in Meriden and have wide-reaching signals that can be heard clearly as far away as Bridgeport and the Massachusetts state line.

WCCT-TV (channel 20) is licensed to Waterbury and serves as Hartford's affiliate for The CW; it is operated out of the Hartford Courant building with sister Tribune Broadcasting Fox affiliate WTIC-TV (channel 61), and carries mainly syndicated content outside of network hours. Waterbury is considered part of the Hartford/New Haven media market, and can thus receive radio and television signals from Hartford and New Haven clearly.

== Infrastructure ==
=== Transportation ===
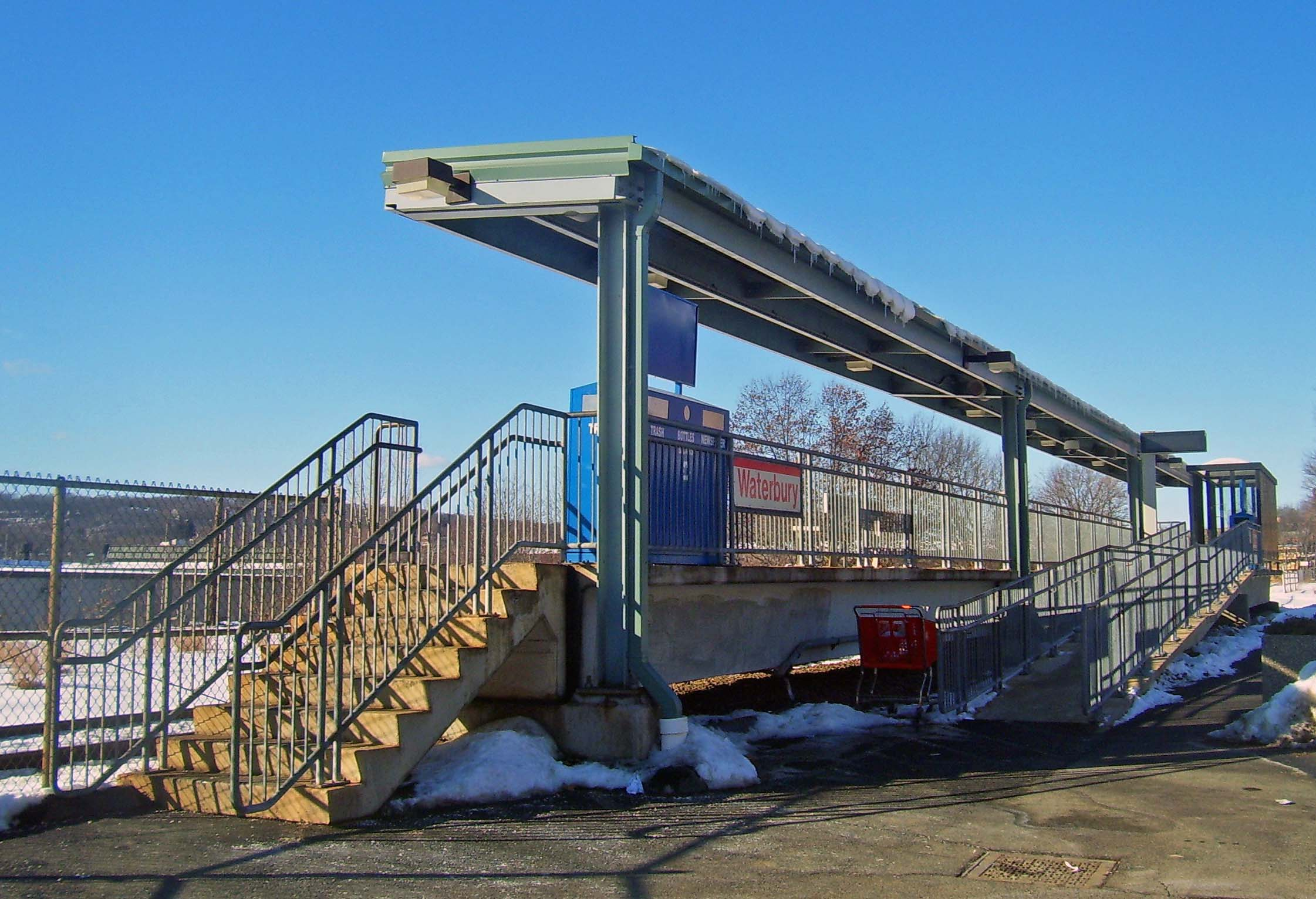
Waterbury Metro-North Railroad station, located on the Waterbury Branch line

Commuting in the Greater Waterbury area consists of multiple public transportation options. CT Transit through Northeast Transportation Company, operates a significant number of city buses running from Waterbury's city center at Exchange Place to various neighborhoods in the city. In 2014, the Hartford-New Britain Busway was opened, a local bus runs to Waterbury, Cheshire, Southington and New Britain an express bus to run between Waterbury and Hartford.

Metro-North Railroad runs commuter trains multiple times a day between the Waterbury station and Bridgeport, with connections to Grand Central Terminal in New York City. Waterbury's Union Station, built in 1909 for the New York, New Haven and Hartford Railroad, is now closed for use as a railway station and part of the building is now the headquarters of the Republican-American newspaper. Passengers traveling to and from Waterbury board and alight on a concrete platform adjacent to the old station. There are no ticket agents at Waterbury, which is currently the end of the line for the Waterbury Branch.

The two main highways that run through the heart of the city are I-84 (Yankee Expressway) and Route 8. In the downtown area, I-84 and Route 8 are located on the elevated William W. Deady Bridge, known locally as the "MixMaster" with eastbound traffic on the upper deck and westbound traffic on the lower deck. The interchange is ranked as one of the most heavily congested traffic areas in the New York/Connecticut region. Waterbury–Oxford Airport is the primary airport serving the city. The smaller Waterbury Airport is about 4 miles (6.4 km) from the city's central business district. Bradley International Airport (BDL) in Windsor Locks and Tweed New Haven Airport (HVN) in East Haven are the closest commercial airports to Waterbury.

=== Police department ===
The Waterbury Police Department was founded in 1853. The department has a police academy.

=== Fire department ===
Waterbury Fire Department is a full-time, paid fire department, which operates eight engine companies, three truck companies, one squad company, and one rescue company out of nine fire stations, divided into 2 battalions. One battalion is commanded by a Battalion Chief, and the other a Deputy Chief, who serves as the Tour Commander each shift.

== Notable people ==
- Fritz Barzilauskas, NFL player
- Michael Bergin, one of first male supermodels, actor on TV's Baywatch
- William F. Bolger, United States Postmaster General 1978–1985
- Amanda Boulier (born 1993), American professional ice hockey defenseman for the Montreal Victoire, U18 World Champion (2011), two-time Isobel Cup champion
- Darren Brass, tattoo artist, reality show character, from TLC hit show Miami Ink
- William H. Bristol, inventor and manufacturer, born in Waterbury; invented "Bristolphone" to simultaneously record voices and other sounds with motion in moving pictures
- Abraham Bronson, minister
- Nixzmary Brown, murder victim
- John Caneira, former MLB player
- Hayden Carruth, poet
- Lucia Chase, dancer, actress, ballet director
- Joe Cipriano, television announcer (also known as Tom Collins on WWCO in Waterbury) for Deal or No Deal and 1 vs. 100
- Deirdre Coleman-Imus, Waterbury-born actress; married radio personality Don Imus in 1995
- Scott Conant, chef, restaurateur, food personality, and cookbook author
- Roger Connor, player in Baseball Hall of Fame
- Bob Crane, actor, of Hogan's Heroes fame; born in Waterbury and worked at Connecticut radio stations before moving to California
- Justin Credible, professional wrestler
- Patrick DeLeon, former president of American Psychological Association and former chief of staff for Senator Daniel Inouye
- Andre "mrDEYO" Deyo, singer-songwriter, best known for writing "Jenny From The Block" for Jennifer Lopez in 2002; graduated from John F. Kennedy High School
- Allie DiMeco, actress, best known for playing Rosalina on The Naked Brothers Band on Nickelodeon
- Joe Diorio, jazz guitarist and theorist, author, teacher at University of Southern California
- Red Donahue, pitcher for six different MLB teams
- Damane Duckett, offensive tackle for NFL's San Francisco 49ers; also played for New York Giants and Carolina Panthers
- Feodor Fedorenko, Nazi war criminal (born in Crimea, deported in 1984)
- Kevin Foster, athlete, actor and Guinness World Record holder
- Robert Gallo, biomedical researcher, known for role in identifying Human Immunodeficiency Virus (HIV) as infectious agent responsible for AIDS
- Mordechai Gifter, one of America's leading Torah scholars, served as rabbi of Waterbury's Jewish community 1941–1945
- Philip Giordano, former mayor of Waterbury (R), stripped of power in 2001 after investigation revealed alleged sexual acts with a minor and other possible pedophilia charges
- Robert D. Glass (1922–2001), first African-American justice of the Connecticut Supreme Court (1987–1992)
- Ralph Goldstein (1913–1997), Olympic épée fencer
- Ryan Gomes, pro basketball player, attended Wilby High School
- Porter Goss, former director of CIA
- Tony Hanson, UConn Husky of Honor, attended Holy Cross High School
- George P. Harlamon, mayor 1968–1970; elected to Waterbury Hall of Fame 2003
- Jahana Hayes, U.S. congresswoman, born in Waterbury
- David Hoadley, president of Panama Railway
- Frank Hogan, former district attorney of New York County
- Samuel Hopkins, American Congregationalist and theologian
- Julius Hotchkiss (1810–1878), congressman and mayor of Waterbury
- Joan Joyce, All-American softball player; also excelled in basketball, bowling, and golf
- Leah Juliett (born 1997), LGBTQ+ activist, spoken word poet, nonprofit leader and philanthropist
- Fred Klobedanz, Major League Baseball pitcher
- Darren LaBonte, CIA officer and Army ranger killed in Camp Chapman attack in 2009
- Gerald Lamb (1924–2014), Waterbury alderman; Connecticut state treasurer (1963–1970) and the first African-American elected to that office in the US since the Reconstruction era
- Annie Leibovitz, celebrated portrait photographer, born in Waterbury in 1949
- Clare Leighton, artist and printmaker, buried in Waterbury in 1989
- Baruch Levine, Jewish music singer-songwriter, and rebbi (teacher) in the Yeshiva Ketana of Waterbury
- Michael Mallory, professional basketball player
- Harold Marcuse, professor of German history at University of California Santa Barbara; grandson of Herbert Marcuse
- Mercedes Martinez, professional wrestler
- Richard A. Mastracchio, NASA astronaut
- Ethel Maynard, first Black woman to serve in the Arizona legislature
- Dylan McDermott, actor, star of television series The Practice
- Winifred McDonald, schoolteacher, politician, Secretary of the State of Connecticut (1949–1951)
- Michael J. McGivney, Catholic priest and founder of the Knights of Columbus
- Bill Meek, football head coach, Kansas State, Houston, Utah
- Two Moon Meridas, lived in Waterbury 1914 to 1933, claimed to be full-blooded Pueblo Indian
- George Metesky (1903–1994), "Mad Bomber" who launched reign of terror in New York City in 1940s and 1950s
- John S. Monagan (1911–2005), mayor, congressman, biographer of Oliver Wendell Holmes Jr.
- Johnny Moore (1902–1991), professional baseball player
- David Nolan, author and historian who attended Anderson School
- Neil O'Leary, mayor of Waterbury (2011–2023)
- Mario Pavone, jazz bassist, composer and bandleader
- Jimmy Piersall, professional baseball player and broadcaster
- Derek Poundstone, professional strongman athlete; won America's Strongest Man contest in 2007
- Peter Pronovost, intensive care specialist at Johns Hopkins Hospital, named by TIME magazine in 2008 as one of the 100 most influential people in the world
- Sheryl Lee Ralph, Tony Award-nominated Jamaican-American actress and singer best known for her work in Broadway productions such as Dreamgirls
- Mark Richards, member of United States House of Representatives and seventh lieutenant governor of Vermont
- John G. Rowland, Waterbury native and former governor of Connecticut (R); resigned from office on July 1, 2004, after prolonged investigation for corruption
- Rosalind Russell, Academy Award-nominated and Tony-winning actress
- Tarah Lynne Schaeffer, actress, best known for playing Tarah on Sesame Street
- Caswell Silver, geologist, president of Sundance Oil Company, established Caswell Silver Foundation at University of New Mexico
- Leon Silver, geologist who trained Apollo astronauts in lunar geology
- John Sirica, Watergate judge; Time magazine's Man of the Year in 1973, born in Waterbury in 1904
- Velvet Sky, wrestler, TNA Knockouts champion
- Richard V. Spencer, former United States Secretary of Defense (2017–2019)
- Terry Tata, Major League Baseball umpire 1973–1999; officiated four World Series and three All-Star games during his career
- Thomas Tessier, writer of horror novels and short stories, born in Waterbury in 1947
- Gene Tierney, actress; attended St. Margaret's School for Girls in Waterbury, but grew up in Brooklyn borough of New York City
- Robert H. Traurig, co-founder of Greenberg Traurig, a law and lobbying firm
- Fay Vincent, 8th commissioner of Major League Baseball
- Dave Wallace, Major League Baseball pitcher, coach and general manager
- Krista Watterworth, interior designer, television presenter
- James H. Whiting (1843–1919), co-founder of Flint Wagon Works

== In popular culture ==
- "The Secret Life of Walter Mitty", by James Thurber, is set in Waterbury in the 1930s.
- In the 1996 movie Happy Gilmore, the "Waterbury Open" is a golf tournament held in Waterbury.
- Gladys Taber's romance novel, Give Me the Stars (1945), was set in Waterbury and in the Chase Brass and Copper Company's factory, giving vivid depictions of factory life during World War II.
- The Today Show on NBC was broadcast from the Hotel Elton on August 18, 1955, to cover the festivities for the world premiere of Waterbury native Rosalind Russell's movie The Girl Rush at the State Theater that evening. A major flood on August 19, 1955, caused over 50 million dollars in property damage and the deaths of 29 Waterbury residents; The Today Show provided live coverage of the flood to the country.
- Waterbury appeared in Ken Burns' documentary miniseries The War as one of four American towns whose history and residents' experiences during World War II were examined in depth.
- Greetings Tour came to Waterbury and painted a large mural of Waterbury's history.
- Wanda (1971) has scenes shot in Waterbury, mostly at Holy Land USA.

== Sister cities ==
- Pontelandolfo, Campania, Italy
- Struga, North Macedonia

== See also ==
- National Register of Historic Places listings in New Haven County, Connecticut
