= Hook and ladder =

Hook and ladder may refer to:

- Hook and ladder, historical firefighting equipment—hooks (pike poles) and ladders
- Hook-and-ladder truck, a modern firefighting apparatus
- Hook and ladder (chess), or deflection sacrifice, a chess tactic
- Hook and ladder (football), a type of trick play used in gridiron football, also known as a hook and lateral

== Media ==
- The Gong on the Hook and Ladder, a short composition by American composer Charles Ives
- Hook and Ladder (1924 film), a film starring Hoot Gibson
- Hook and Ladder (1932 film), an Our Gang film

== Historic structures ==
All located in the United States

- Aetna Hose, Hook and Ladder Company Fire Station No. 1, in New Castle County, Delaware
- Aetna Hose, Hook and Ladder Company, Fire Station No. 2, in New Castle County, Delaware
- Andover Hook and Ladder Company Building, in Andover, Maine
- Cold Spring Harbor Fire District Hook and Ladder Company Building, in Suffolk County, New York
- Engine House No. 2 and Hook and Ladder No. 9, in Erie County, New York
- Firehouse, Hook & Ladder Company 8, in Manhattan, New York
- Firehouse, Engine Company 10 and Ladder Company 10, in Manhattan, New York
- Hook and Ladder No. 1 and Hose Co. No. 2, in Grand Forks, North Dakota
- Hook and Ladder No. 3, in Hudson County, New Jersey
- Hook and Ladder No. 4, in Albany, New York
- Hook and Ladder House No. 5–Detroit Fire Department Repair Shop, in Detroit, Michigan
- Hose and Hook and Ladder Truck Building, in Thomaston, Connecticut
- Keystone Hook and Ladder Company, in Reading, Berks County, Pennsylvania
- Morgan Hook and Ladder Company, in Ontario County, New York
- Number 4 Hook and Ladder Company, in Dallas, Texas
- W. H. Bradford Hook and Ladder Fire House, in Bennington, Vermont
