= Robert W. Hill =

American architect

Robert Wakeman Hill
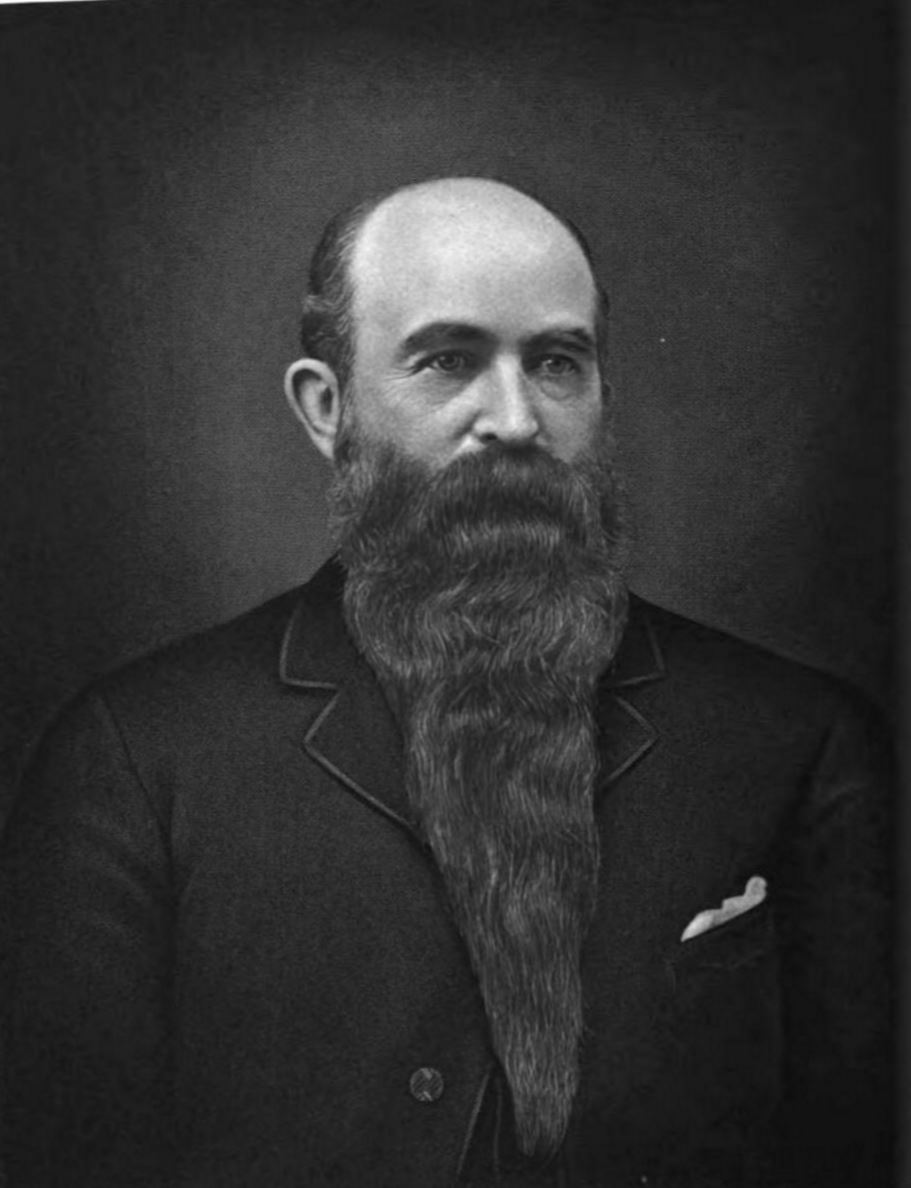
- Robert W. Hill, 1895
- Born: September 20, 1828; Waterbury, Connecticut
- Died: July 16, 1909 (aged 80); Waterbury, Connecticut
- Occupation: Architect
- Buildings: Ansonia Opera House; Waterbury City Hall; Bronson B. Tuttle House; New Britain Opera House; Thomaston Town Hall; Litchfield County Courthouse; Soldiers' Memorial Tower

Robert W. Hill (20 September 1828 – 16 July 1909) was an American architect from Waterbury, Connecticut. He was one of Connecticut's most important 19th century architects.

== Life and career ==
Robert Wakeman Hill was born in Waterbury of September 20, 1828, to Samuel and Polly (Brackett) Hill. He attended the public schools, after which he went to New Haven to study architecture. He first attended the Young Men's Institute, where he learned architectural drawing. He obtained a position in the office of Henry Austin, during which he also taught at the YMI. At one point he was also employed by Sidney Mason Stone. He then worked in Milwaukee, Wisconsin for Albert C. Nash, a former Connecticut architect. In 1858 he returned to Connecticut, establishing himself as an architect in the town of Naugatuck. In 1863 he relocated to Waterbury, where he would quickly become the city's most prominent architect, a position he retained for the rest of his career.

== Legacy ==
Hill trained several other Waterbury architects, including Joseph A. Jackson, Wilfred E. Griggs and Theodore B. Peck. At least five buildings designed by him have been placed on the National Register of Historic Places, and many others contribute to listed historic districts.

== Works ==
- 1865 - St. Margaret's School, 88 Cooke St, Waterbury, Connecticut
  - Demolished.
- 1866 - John Kendrick House, 119 W Main St, Waterbury, Connecticut
  - Often attributed to Hill or his teacher, Henry Austin.
- 1866 - Warren House, 110 Woodbury Rd, Watertown, Connecticut
  - Later the Taft School's main building. Demolished.
- 1869 - Christ Episcopal Church (Bethlehem, Connecticut) (remodeling), Main St S, Bethlehem, Connecticut
- 1869 - Opera House Block, 100 Main St, Ansonia, Connecticut
- 1869 - Waterbury City Hall (former), 55 W Main St, Waterbury, Connecticut
  - Burned in 1912.
- 1870 - Post Office Block, 1 W Main St, New Britain, Connecticut
- 1871 - Edward M. Chapin House, 25 Church St, New Hartford, Connecticut
- 1871 - Soldiers' Monument, Woodbury Common, Woodbury, Connecticut
- 1874 - First Congregational Church Centennial Chapel, 251 Main St, East Haven, Connecticut
- 1878 - Albert C. Peck House, 8 Mountain Rd, Woodbury, Connecticut
- 1879 - Bronson B. Tuttle House, 380 Church St, Naugatuck, Connecticut
- 1879 - William H. Anderson House, Andover Street, [Lowell, Massachusetts] ** Demolished.
- 1880 - New Britain Opera House, 466-468 Main St, New Britain, Connecticut
  - Demolished.
- 1880 - Winsted Real Estate Building, 13-17 Park Pl W, Winsted, Connecticut
- 1881 - Coe Brass Office Building, 179 Water St, Torrington, Connecticut
- 1882 - Welton Street School (former), 36 Welton St, Waterbury, Connecticut
- 1882 - Thomaston Fire Station, Main St, Thomaston, Connecticut
- 1883 - Hall Memorial Chapel, Riverside Cemetery, Waterbury, Connecticut
- 1883 - Thomaston Town Hall and Opera House, 153 Main St, Thomaston, Connecticut
- 1883 - Waterbury Armory, Phoenix Ave, Waterbury, Connecticut
  - Demolished.
- 1883 - Watertown Library (former), 50 DeForest St, Watertown, Connecticut
  - Now owned by the Taft School.
- 1884 - Griggs Building, 221-227 Bank St, Waterbury, Connecticut
- 1885 - Bridgeport Armory, 1494 Main St, Bridgeport, Connecticut
  - Highly altered.
- 1885 - Rectory for St. John's Episcopal Church, 21 Church St, Waterbury, Connecticut
- 1886 - Ansonia Station, 40 W Main St, Ansonia, Connecticut
  - Demolished.
- 1886 - New Britain Armory (former), 10 Grand St, New Britain, Connecticut
- 1886 - Norwalk Armory, Connecticut Ave, Norwalk, Connecticut
  - Demolished.
- 1887 - Wilbur Drake House, 386 Main St, New Hartford, Connecticut
- 1887 - Congregational Parish House, Division St, Naugatuck, Connecticut
- 1888 - Litchfield County Courthouse, 15 West St, Litchfield, Connecticut
  - Altered.
- 1889 - Police Department Headquarters, Leavenworth St, Waterbury, Connecticut
  - Demolished.
- 1890 - Soldiers' Memorial Tower, Memorial Park, Winsted, Connecticut
  - With George Edwin Bissell, sculptor.
- 1891 - Berlin Free Library (former), Worthington Ridge, Berlin, Connecticut
  - Demolished in 1955.
- 1891 - Conway (Yankee Pedlar) Inn, 95 Main St, Torrington, Connecticut
- 1891 - Litchfield Fire Station (former), 40 West St, Litchfield, Connecticut

== Gallery ==
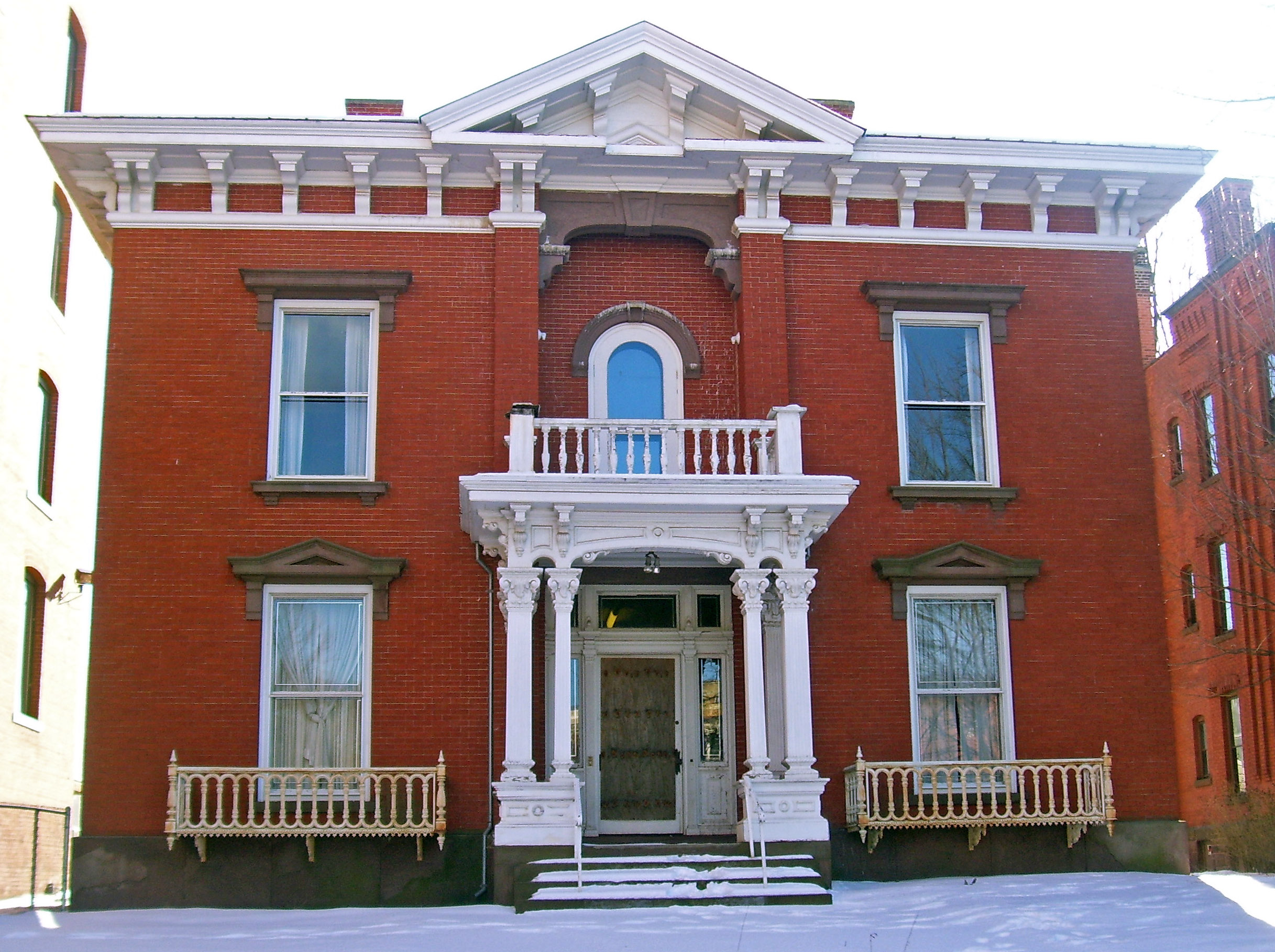
John Kendrick House, Waterbury, 1866.

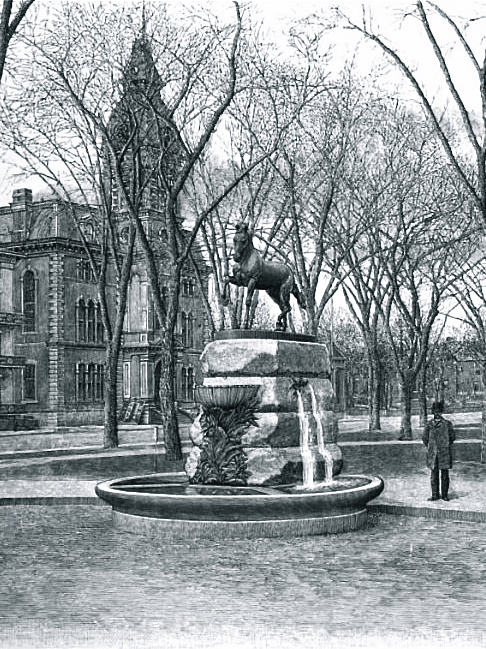
Waterbury City Hall, Waterbury, 1869.

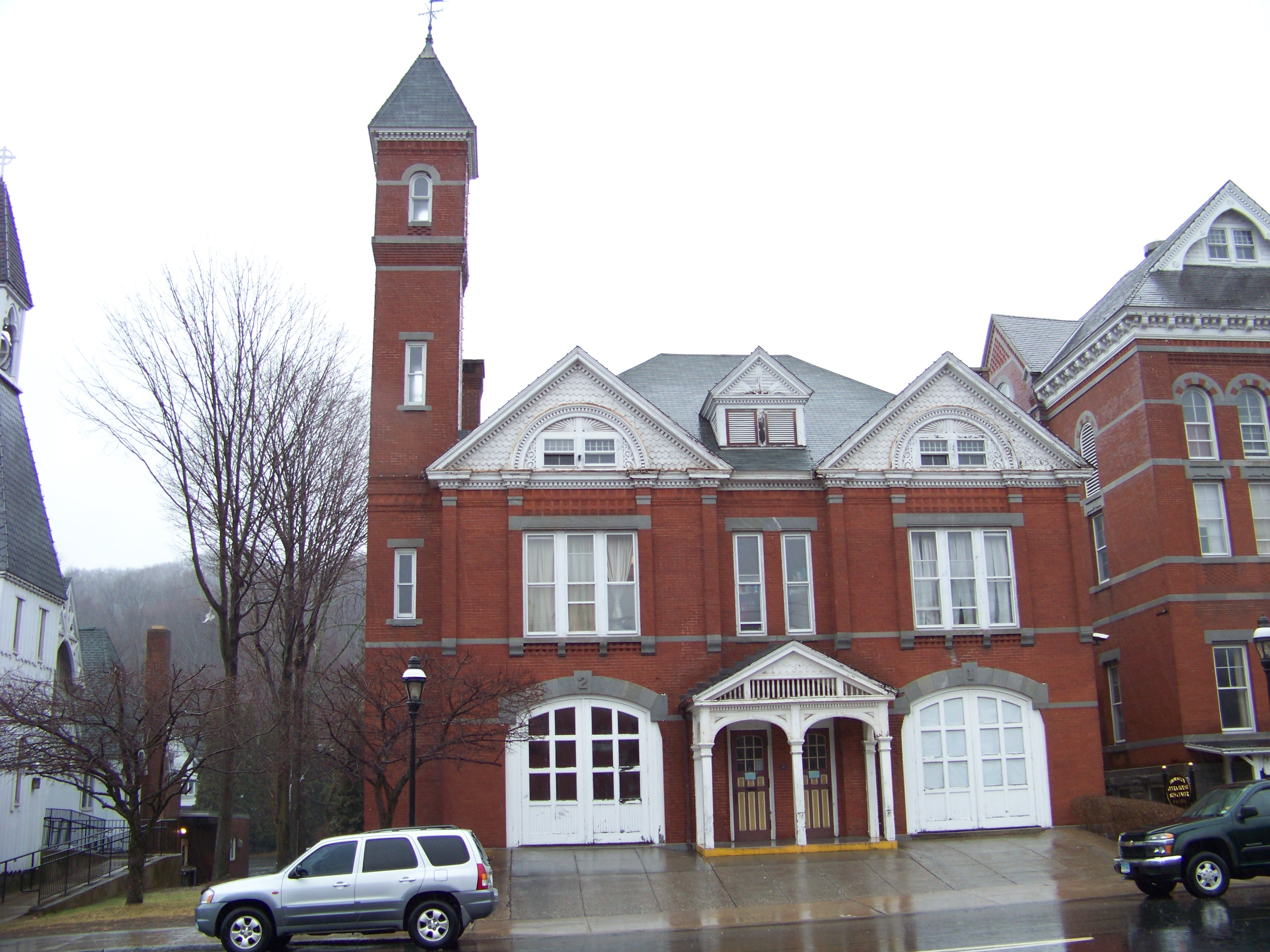
Fire Station, Thomaston, 1882.

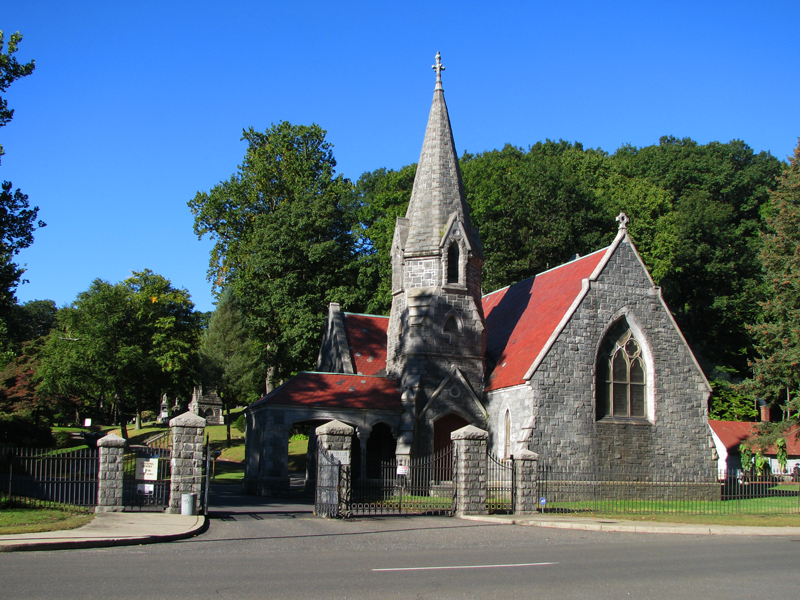
Hall Memorial Chapel, Riverside Cemetery, 1883.

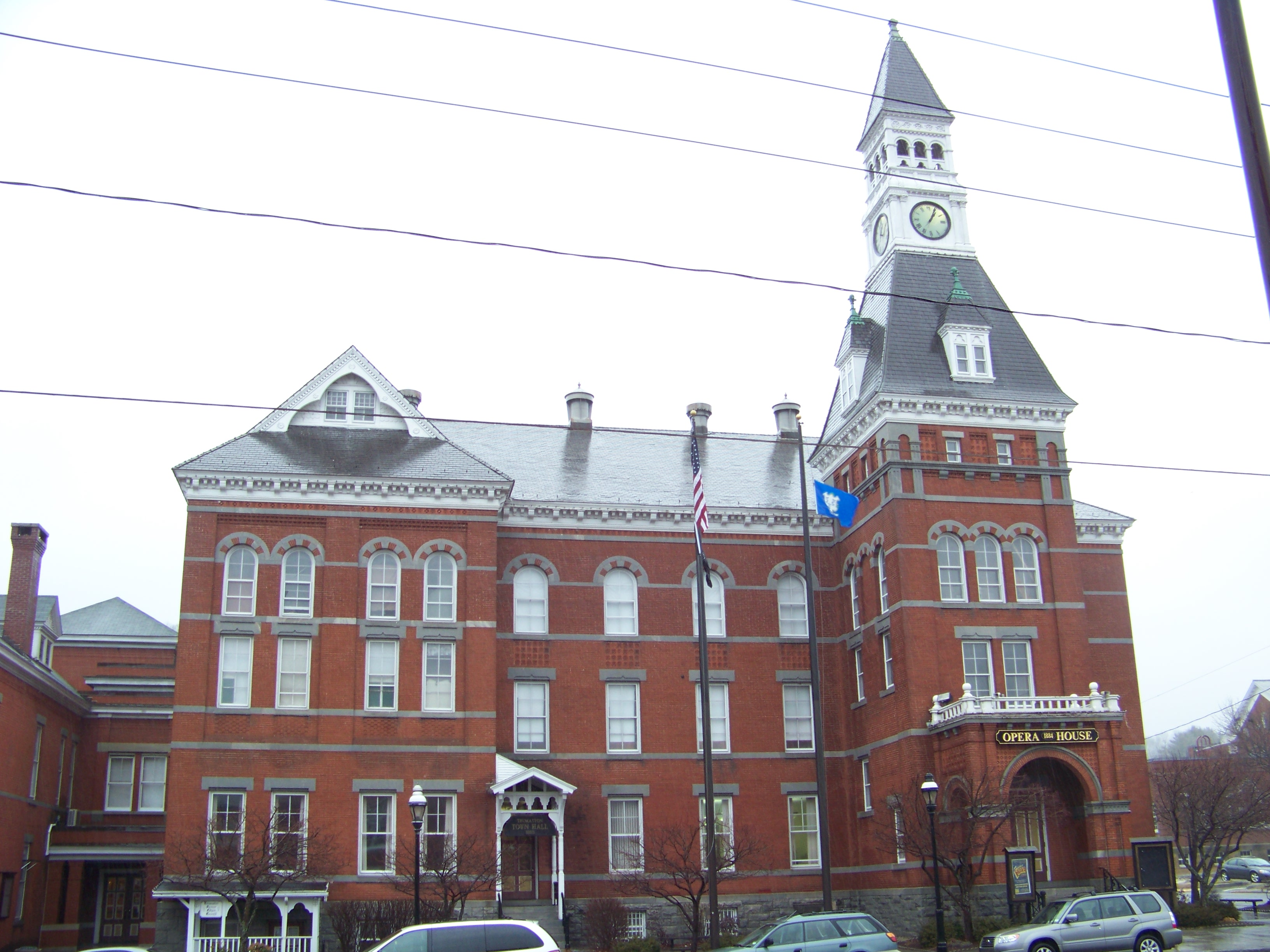
Town Hall, Thomaston, 1883.

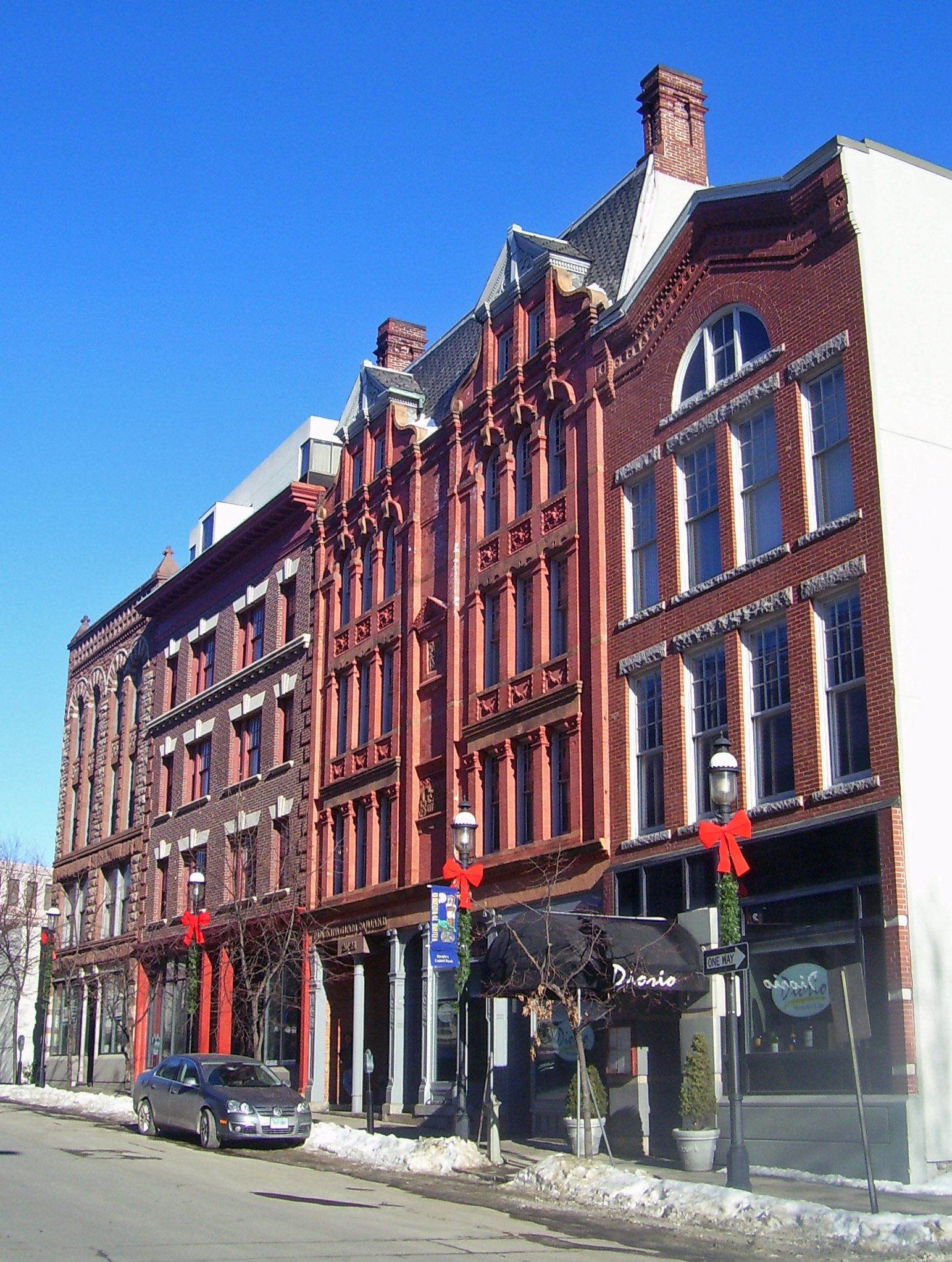
Griggs Building, Waterbury, 1884.

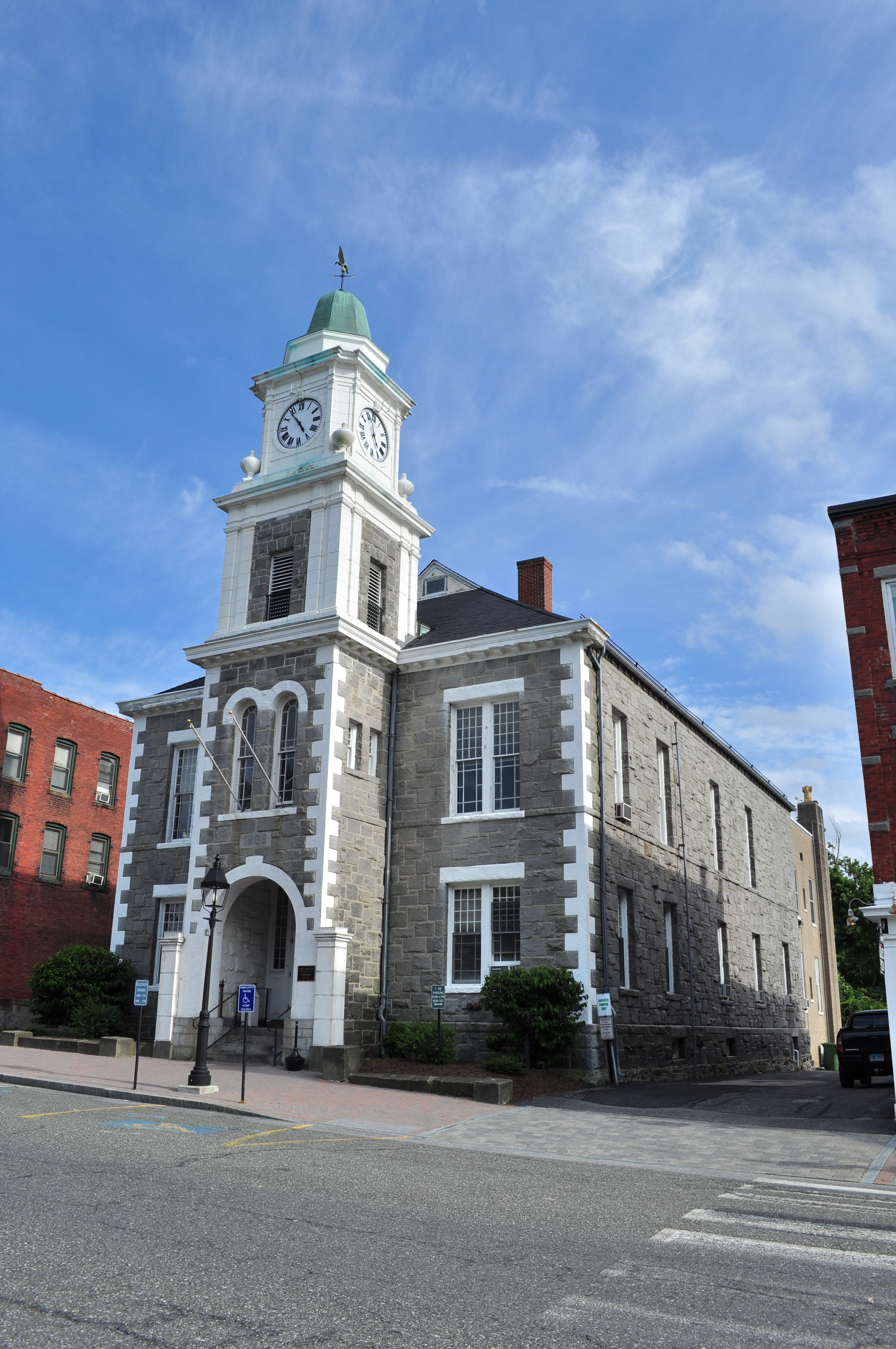
County Courthouse, Litchfield, 1888.

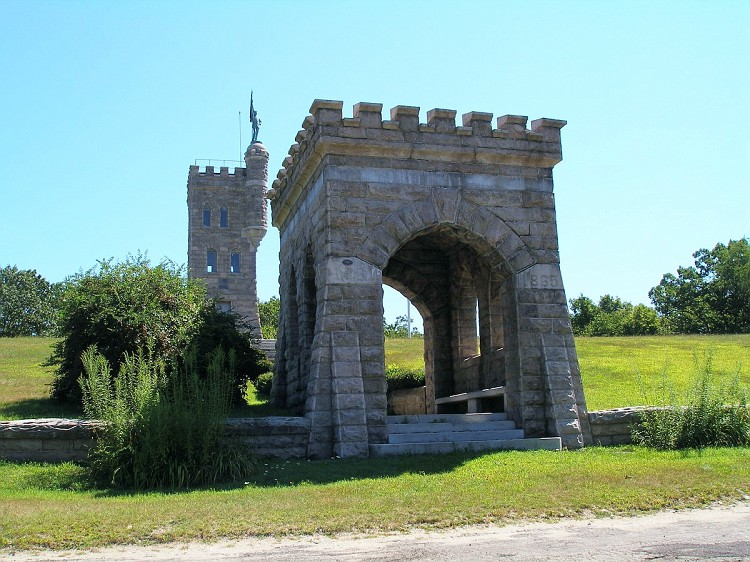
Soldiers' Memorial, Winsted, 1890.

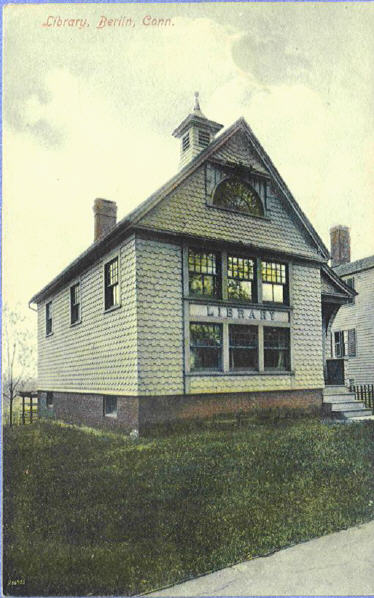
Berlin Free Library, Berlin, 1891.

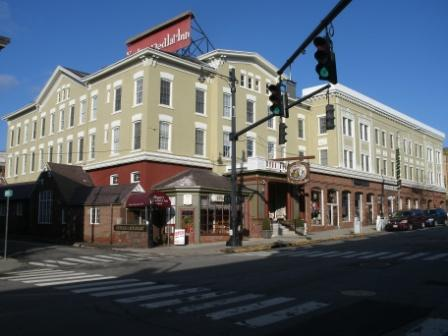
Conley Inn, Torrington, 1891.

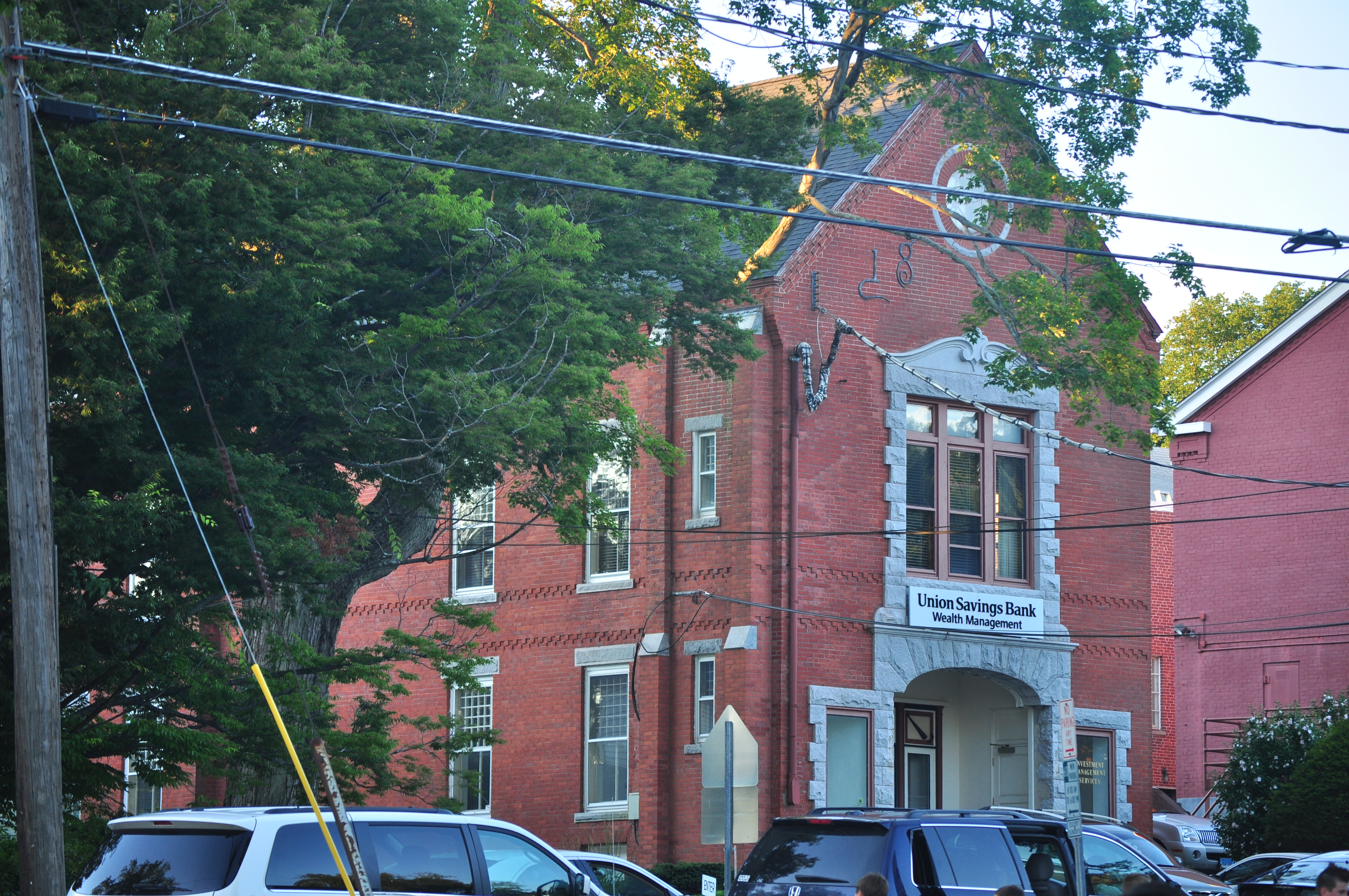
Fire Station, Litchfield, 1891.
