= Tranquility Farm =

- U.S. National Register of Historic Places
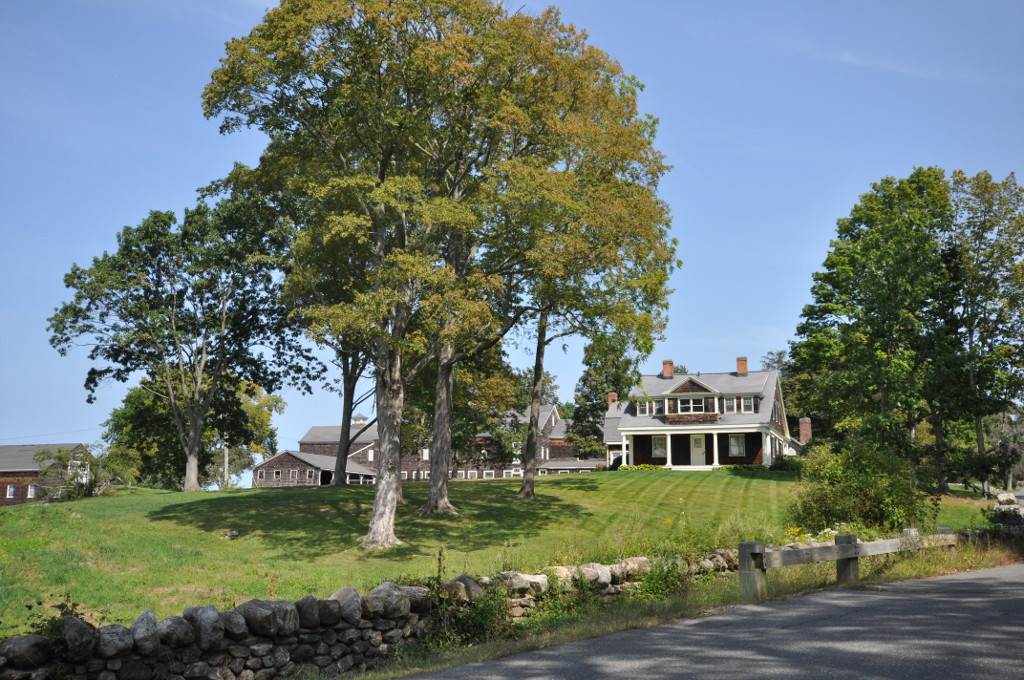

- Location within Connecticut Location within the United States
- Location: Tranquility Road, Middlebury, Connecticut
- Coordinates: 41°32′0″N 73°8′29″W
- Area: 296 acres (120 ha)
- Built: 1895
- Architect: McKim, Mead & White; Eliot, Charles & Warren H. Manning
- Architectural style: Colonial Revival, Shingle Style
- NRHP reference No.: 82004355
- Added to NRHP: September 23, 1982

Tranquility Farm is a historic summer estate located on Tranquility Road in Middlebury, Connecticut. The estate was developed in the 1890s by industrialist John H. Whittemore, with architectural design by the noted firm of McKim, Mead & White, and landscape design by Charles Eliot and Warren H. Manning. The main house was a rare inland example of Shingle Style architecture in the state. The property was listed on the National Register of Historic Places in 1982. The main house was demolished sometime after listing.

== Description and history ==
Tranquility Farm occupies nearly 300 acres (120 ha) on the east side of Lake Quassapaug, west of Middlebury's town center. The property is bounded on the south by Spring Road and Connecticut Route 64, and is roughly divided by Tranquility Road and Whittemore Road. The estate's landscape features broad meadows with expansive views over the lake, stone walls lining the roadways, and a large woodland area to the east. There are several clusters of buildings which dot this landscape, with the main house near the junction of Tranquility and Whittemore Roads. It was an expansive structure, with a fieldstone lower level and shingled exterior. At the southern end of the property are the buildings of the True Quality Farm, the estate's working farmyards. Prominent among these buildings is the former farmhouse, a Federal-period gable-roofed building.

Development of the estate was commissioned by John H. Whittemore, a businessman who was born in Southbury, and whose home and principal businesses were in Naugatuck. Whittemore was a major figure in Naugatuck, sponsoring a series of commissions of McKim, Mead & White for buildings in the city center. The house designed for him was rare in the state as an inland example of the Shingle style, which is most often found in coastal settings, and for its transitional Colonial Revival features. McKim, Mead & White also designed some of the buildings in the farm complex, and the estate's boathouse was designed by Henry Moeckel. The landscaping of the estate, which includes grading to obscure features such as roadways from a number of vantage points, was primarily the work of Warren H. Manning, with inspiration from Charles Eliot.

== See also ==
- National Register of Historic Places listings in New Haven County, Connecticut
