= Winchester Soldiers' Monument =

- U.S. National Register of Historic Places
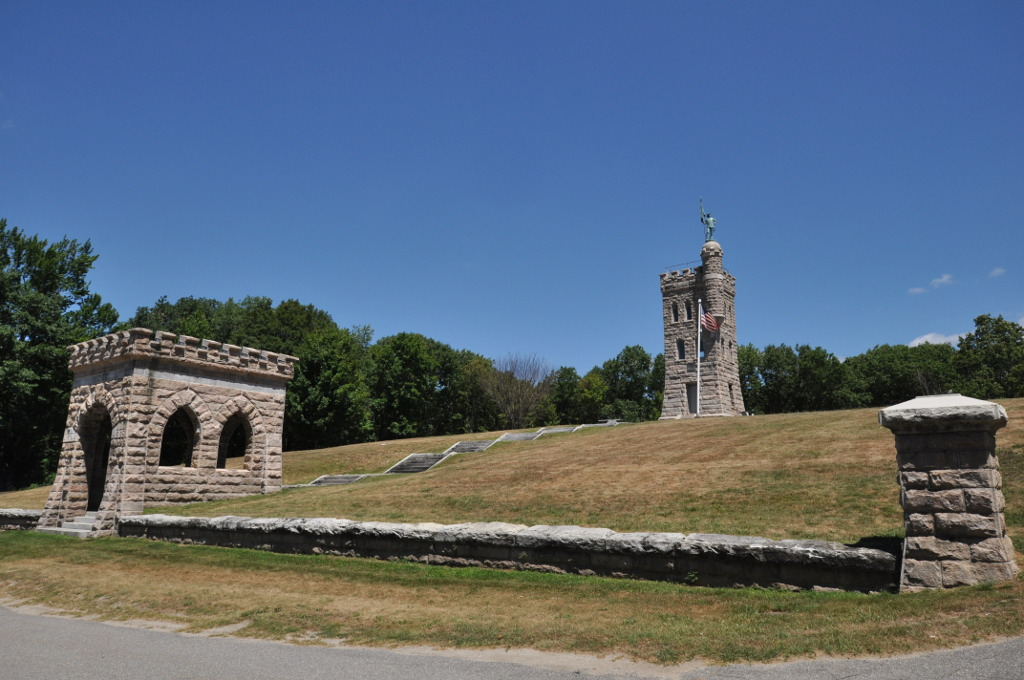

- Location within Connecticut Location within the United States
- Location: Crown Street, Winchester, Connecticut
- Coordinates: 41°55′29″N 73°4′22″W
- Area: 2 acres (0.81 ha)
- Built: 1889
- Architect: Hill, Robert W., et al
- NRHP reference No.: 84001105
- Added to NRHP: January 26, 1984

The Winchester Soldiers' Monument is a historic war memorial located in a park-like setting at the end of Crown Street in the Winsted area of Winchester, Connecticut. Built in 1889–90, it commemorates the community's participants in the American Civil War. It is one of Connecticut's most architecturally elaborate memorials to that conflict. It was listed on the National Register of Historic Places in 1984.

== Description and history ==
The Winchester Soldiers' Monument is located in a residential area north of the commercial Main Street area of Winsted, at the southern end of Crown Street. The park in which it is set is atop a circular hill, which is grassed down to the park drive, paths and a few trees dotting its interior. A low stone retaining wall lines the parking area on Crown Street. A square entrance arch with crenellated top provides access to one of the paths leading to the main monument. The main structure is a three-level tower built of ashlar granite from a local quarry, and is square in footprint. Its walls slope inward in the lower stage to eventually straighten and are crowned by crenellations. At one corner a circular tourelle projects from the third level, topped by a bronze figure of a soldier holding colors. There is a single entrance on one face, with single windows on each of the other first-floor facades, and two windows on each of the upper levels. The total height of the tower is 44 feet (13 m).

The memorial was completed in 1890 to a design by Robert Hill of Waterbury; the bronze figure was designed by George Bissell. The interior was originally to have an iron staircase installed, but this never occurred due a disagreement with the contractor, and a wooden staircase (intended to be temporary) was installed instead. Funds for the memorial's construction were raised by the local chapter of the Grand Army of the Republic. In 1977–78, a water fountain was installed near the tower, designed by Andrew Coppola, a sculptor from Hartford.

== See also ==
- National Register of Historic Places listings in Litchfield County, Connecticut
