= Christ Episcopal Church (Bethlehem, Connecticut) =

Historic church in Connecticut, United States

Christ Church
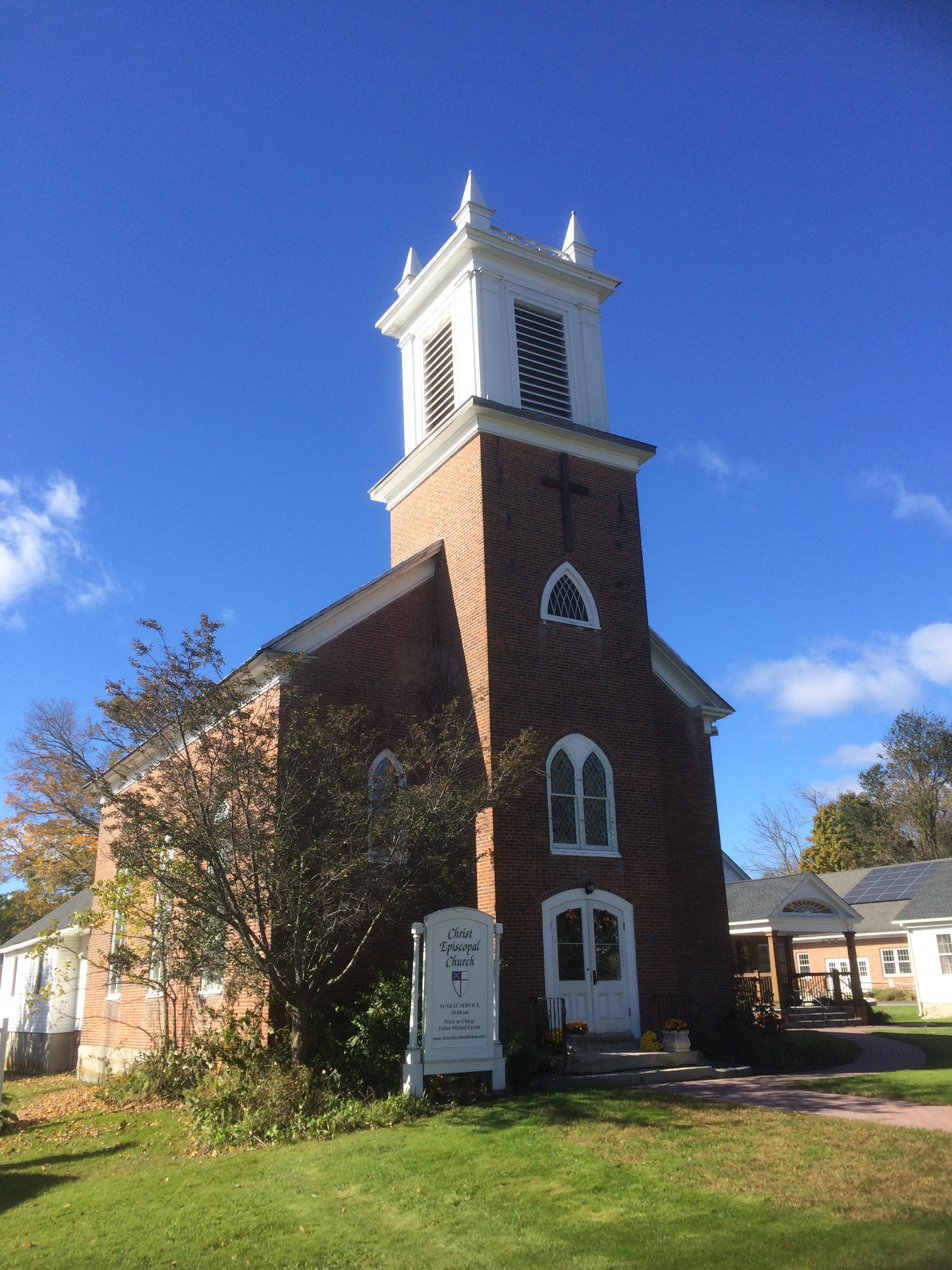
- Christ Church Exterior, 2018

- Location in Connecticut Location in the United States
- 41.63829°N 73.20899°W
- Location: 18 Main Street South, Bethlehem, CT 06751
- Country: United States
- Language: English
- Denomination: Episcopalian
- Website: www.christepiscopalchurchbethlehem.com

History
- Founded: March 13, 1807 as "Episcopal Society of Bethlem"
- Consecrated: September 23, 1835

Architecture
- Heritage designation: National Historic District building
- Designated: December 16, 1982
- Architect(s): 1871 renovations by Robert W. Hill, architect
- Architectural type: Gothic Revival
- Years built: 1829, 1871, 1932, 1955, 1983
- Groundbreaking: 1829
- Completed: 1832

Specifications
- Length: 44 ft (13 m)
- Width: 30 ft (9.1 m)
- Materials: brick, wood, pressed metal

Administration
- Division: Anglican Communion
- Province: I
- Diocese: The Episcopal Church in Connecticut

Clergy
- Bishop(s): The Right Rev. Jeff W. Mello, Bishop Diocesan; the Right Rev. Laura J. Ahrens, Bishop Suffragan

Christ Episcopal Church is a historic Episcopal church located on the town green of Bethlehem, Connecticut, United States.

The church reported 69 members in 2017 and 21 members in 2025. Plate and pledge income for the congregation in 2025 was $3,522 with average Sunday attendance (ASA) of 24.

Founded as a parish early in the 19th century, the church has been a central part of the life of the town ever since. The building is an outstanding example of Gothic Revival architecture, and its unique metal roof helps incorporate it visually with other historic buildings in the area around the green. Major renovations were designed by R. W. Hill, a noted Waterbury architect, early in his career. It also houses a Jardine tracker organ designed in 1855. Along with the First Congregational Church across the street and the Bellamy-Ferriday House on another side of the town green, Christ Episcopal Church helps anchor the historic center of this small rural town in Litchfield County, Connecticut.

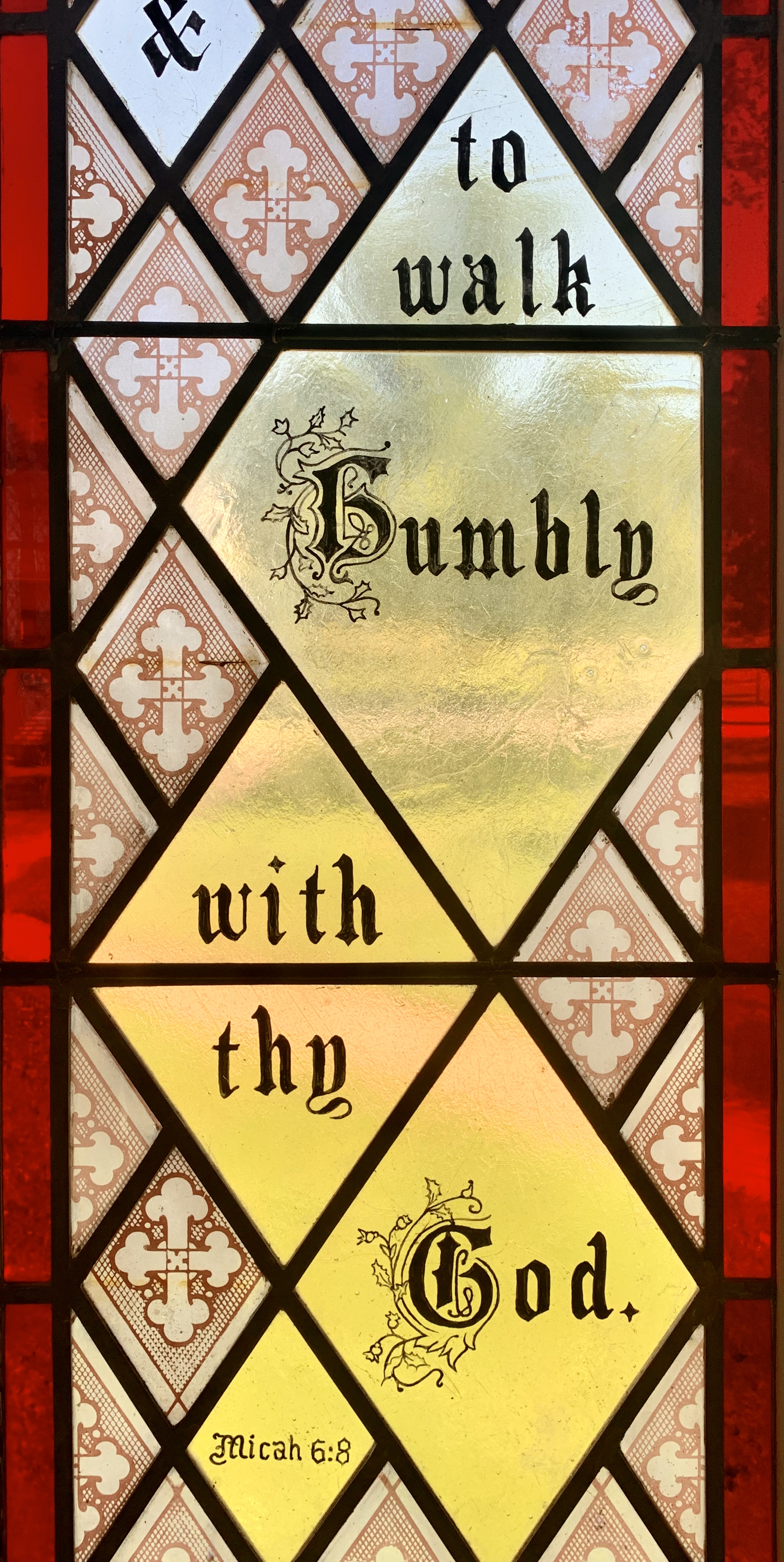
Christ Church window 2020

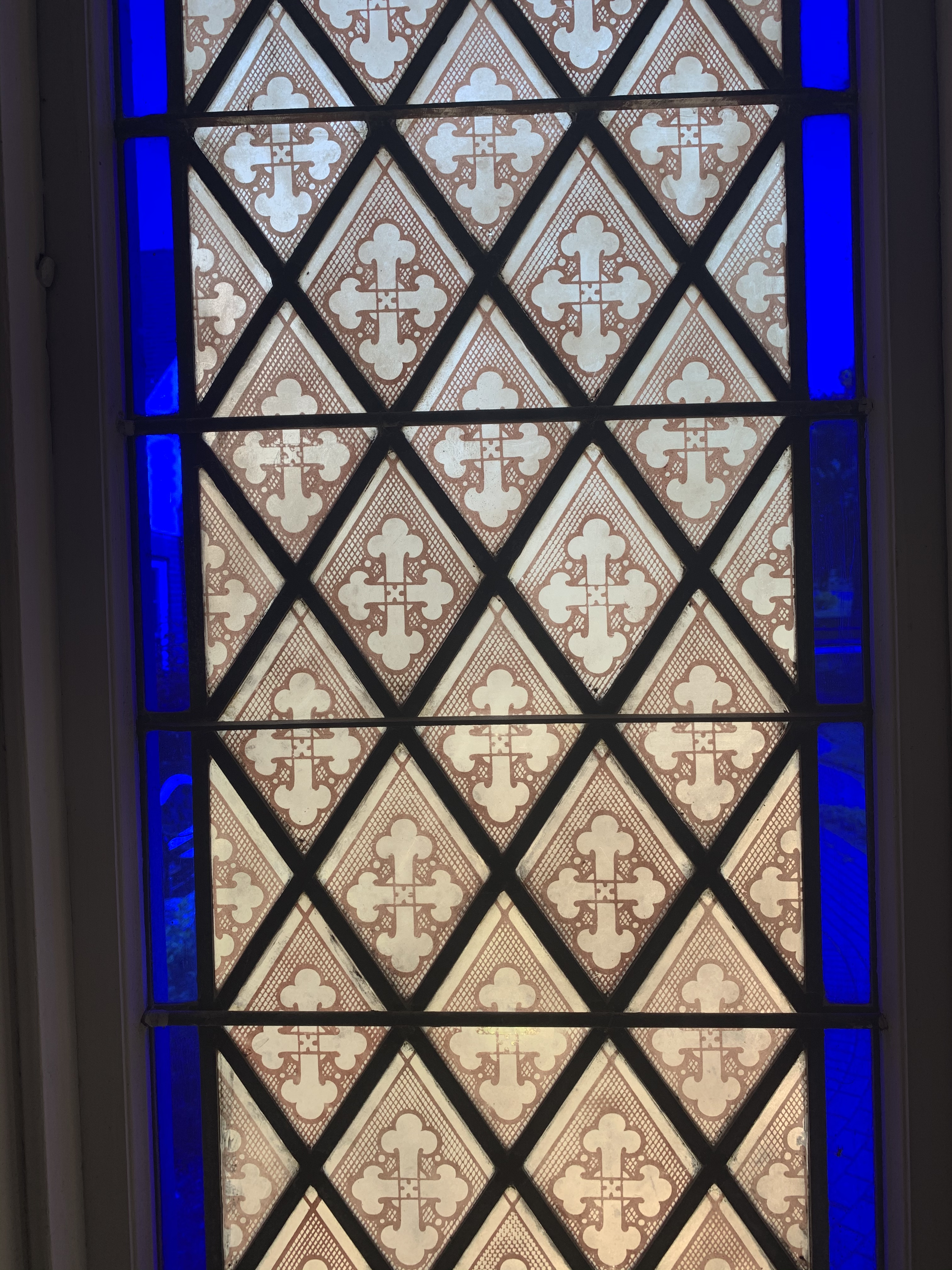
Christ Church window 2020

== History ==
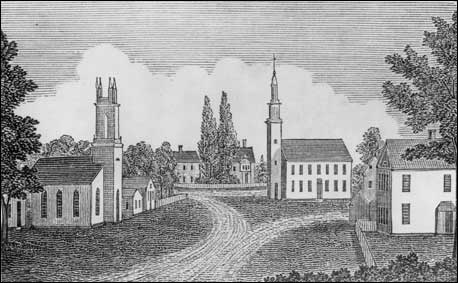

Even while the official state religion of Connecticut was still the Congregational Church, in 1807 fourteen individuals living in Bethlehem declared themselves to be members of the Protestant Episcopal Church in the State of Connecticut, according to a legal notice of their intention to meet submitted to the local Justice of the Peace on March 13 that year. The notice declared that the meeting was to be held at the home of Amos Lake. Earlier meetings may have been held at the home of George Bloss on Carmel Hill in town. It was not until after the disestablishment of the Congregational Church in Connecticut by the new state constitution in 1818, however, that any serious thought was given to erecting a sanctuary. Even then, it was not until 1829 that ground was finally broken on a site adjacent to the town green. "Mr. Atwood" contributed $500 toward the effort, but even his generous gift did not hurry along the construction. In May 1831, the building committee finally voted that the inside of the church be finished off "after the plan entitled No. 1, with circular seats with one pair of stairs to the pulpit." The initial building was 30 feet by 44 feet and built in the Greek Revival style of architecture, with bricks from the local Thompson brickyard. Shortly after the sanctuary was completed, in 1832 the town constructed a school building slightly to the north of the church. Finally in the fall of 1835, Bishop Thomas Church Brownell consecrated the building and named it "Christ Church." Eighteen parishioners contributed $3,041 to an endowment to help pay the salary for a priest. The parish began to thrive. It appears on the left of Barber's famous woodcut portrayal of the town green in 1836 shown here.

By 1849, the current bell, made at Meneely Bell Foundry, was mounted in the tower in the center of the east facade. By 1869, the parish employed the services of a new up and coming architect in Waterbury, Robert W. Hill, to help them renovate their church. Hill had already begun to earn his reputation as an architect for notable houses in the area, but in 1869 he was hired to take on larger projects in addition to the renovation of Christ Church. These included City Hall in Waterbury and the Opera House block in Ansonia. The renovations at Christ Church were extensive, and included adding a chancel and a raised altar, creating two aisles in the sanctuary instead of one central aisle, and a sacristy. The ceiling was also lowered, which entailed redesigning the gothic windows as well. The renovations were completed by 1871.

The stress surrounding the renovations may have contributed to a difficult moment in the history of the parish in 1874, when at the annual parish meeting the question was asked whether to remain open because of the financial strain. Some members had already left to join the Congregational Church across the street at the invitation of the Congregationalists. However, the parish survived the year and paid off their debts, although with reduced hours for the priest for many of the ensuing years.

By 1931, the fortunes of the parish rose with the gift of funds used to construct and endow a new parish hall and kitchen, named after one of its former senior wardens, Albert Johnson. Attendance had returned to former levels, and the parish was able to support many of its former ministries, including a choir and an active Sunday School program. In fact, the town leased the former Town School building to the parish for its Sunday School. In the mid-1950s, two offices, a meeting room, and a basement were added behind the sanctuary. In 1966, a generous memorial gift enabled the parish to purchase, move, install and renovate its current historic organ. In 1983, the parish was able to construct a connector between the parish hall and the church offices.

=== List of clergy ===
Name	Tenure
Ruppel Wheeler	1807
Mr. Wilton	1809
Joseph D. Welton	1814–16
Sturgis Gilbert	1825–27
Isaac Jones	1828
William Wheeler	1828–30
Joseph Scott	1830–32
John Downdey	1832–34
William Watson	1834–37
F. W. Snow	1834–37
Isaac H. Tuttle	1839–44
Johnathan Coe	1844–47
William H. Frisbie	1847–48
J. S. Covell	1848–51
J. D. Berry	1851–52
N. W. Monroe	1852–53
James R. Coe	1854–55
J. D. Berry (2nd time)	1857
Edward P. Gray	1857
John N. Marvin	1858–61
Frederick Holcomb	1861–65
Alonzo N. Lewis	1865–70
John N. Marvin (2nd time)	1870–72
H. R. Whitlock	1872–74
Alanson Welton	1873–74
William H. Lewis (shared)	1874-78
Clayton Eddy (shared)	1874–78
J. B. Robinson	1878–83
Ralph H. Bowles	1884–90
J. Chauncey Linsley	1890–95
J. T. Hargraves	1895–97
Edward M. Skagen	1898–99
L. Robert Sheffield	1900–03
Sidney H. Dixon	1903–07
Clarence H. Beers	1907–23
Anton T. Gesner	1923–28
Nugent Samwell	1928–38
Carter Gillis	1938–41
John Wilson	1942
Charles J. Harriman	1942–51
Nelson R. Pearson	1951–61
Charles Brown	1961–75
Andrew Zeman	1975–81
George Brower	1981–82
John Satton	1982–85
William Penny	1985–89
John Satton (2nd time)	1989–91
K. R. Firth	1991
David G. Pritchard	1992–2007
James A. Speer	2008–13
Michael J. Curran	2013–18
David K. McIntosh	2018–19
Thomas Word Peters	2019–2022

=== Historic Organ ===
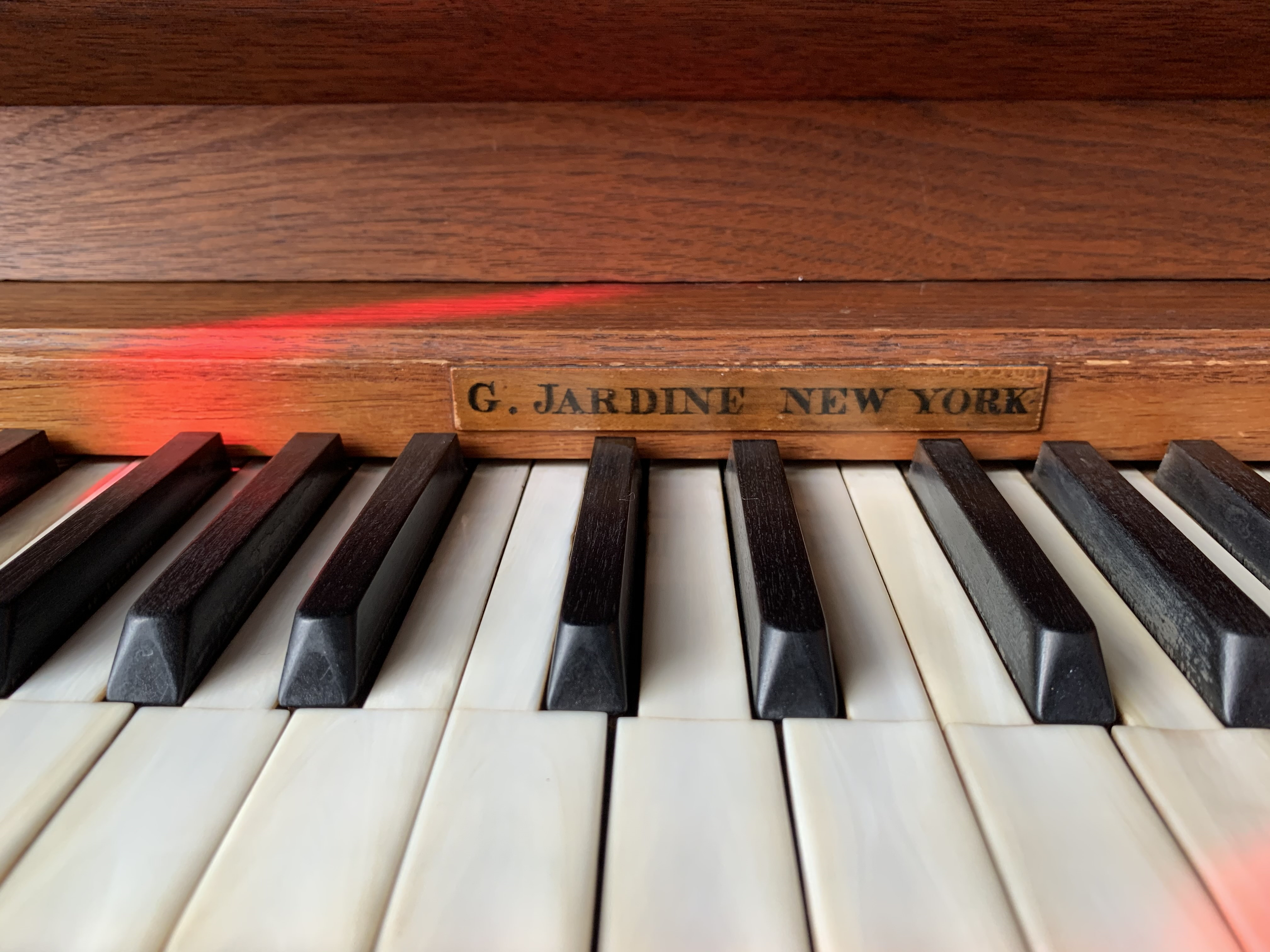
Nameplate Jardine Tracker Organ, 1855. Christ Church, Bethlehem, CT. Taken in 2020

The organ was designed by George Jardine in 1855. Jardine & Sons was a famous organ builder in New York City between 1837 and 1900. After George's son, Edward G. Jardine, joined the firm in 1855, the style of organs the firm produced began to shift from a style suitable to late 18th century English works to the broader European Romantic idiom. An outstanding example of this is their work in 1879 creating the Gallery Organ in St. Patrick's Cathedral in New York City in time for its official opening. (The organ was subsequently replaced in 1927).

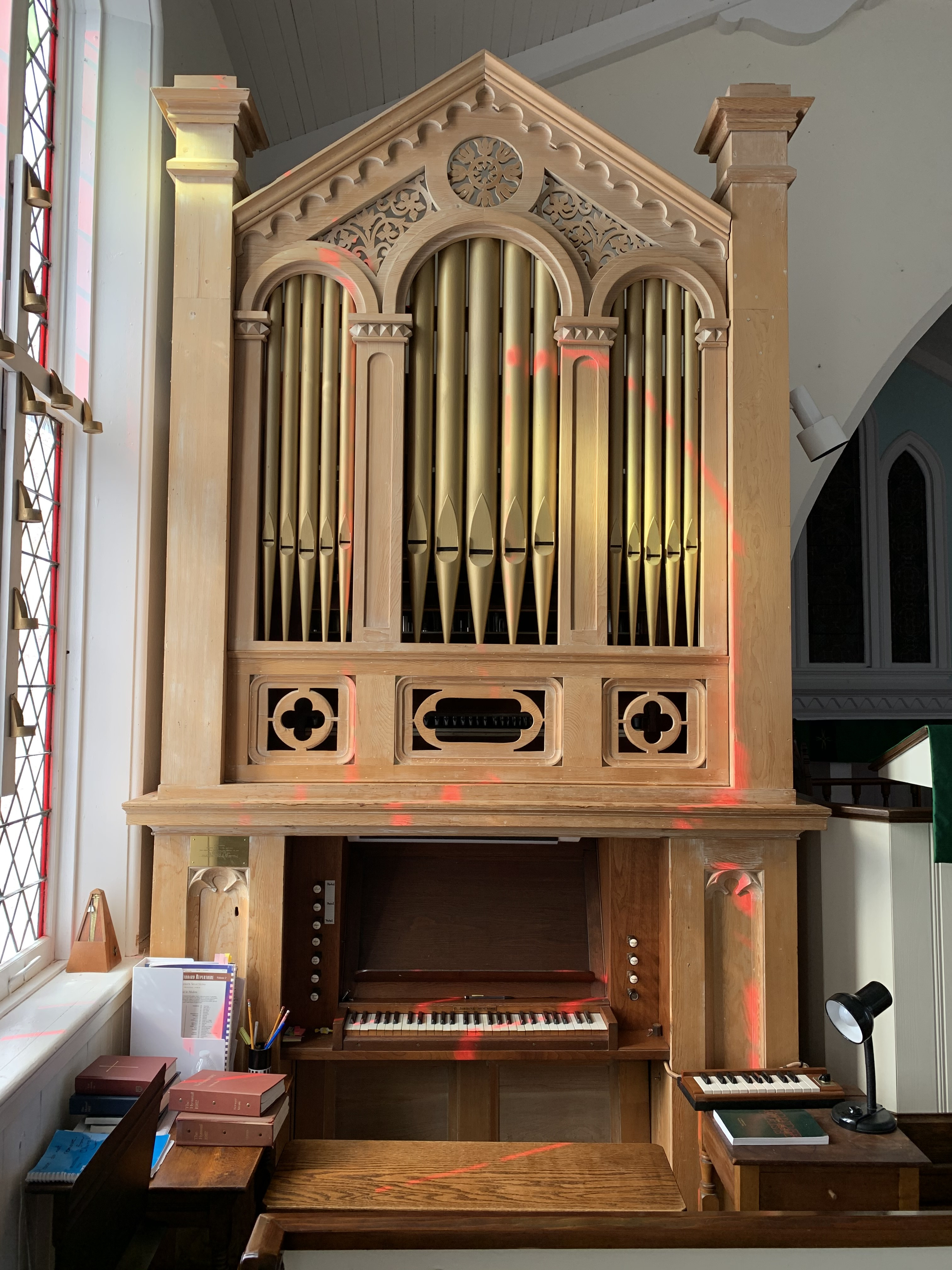
Jardine Tracker Organ, 1855. Christ Church, Bethlehem, CT. Taken in 2020

Thus the organ at Christ Church represents a critical transition point for the firm. There are 61 organs built by George Jardine in the Pipe Organ database of the Organ Historical Society, of which only 13 remain extant. This organ was originally located at St. Paul's Episcopal Church in Woodbury, Connecticut, but in 1966 it was moved to this location and restored. Some additional pipes were added, and while not original, they are of a similar age to the original pipes.

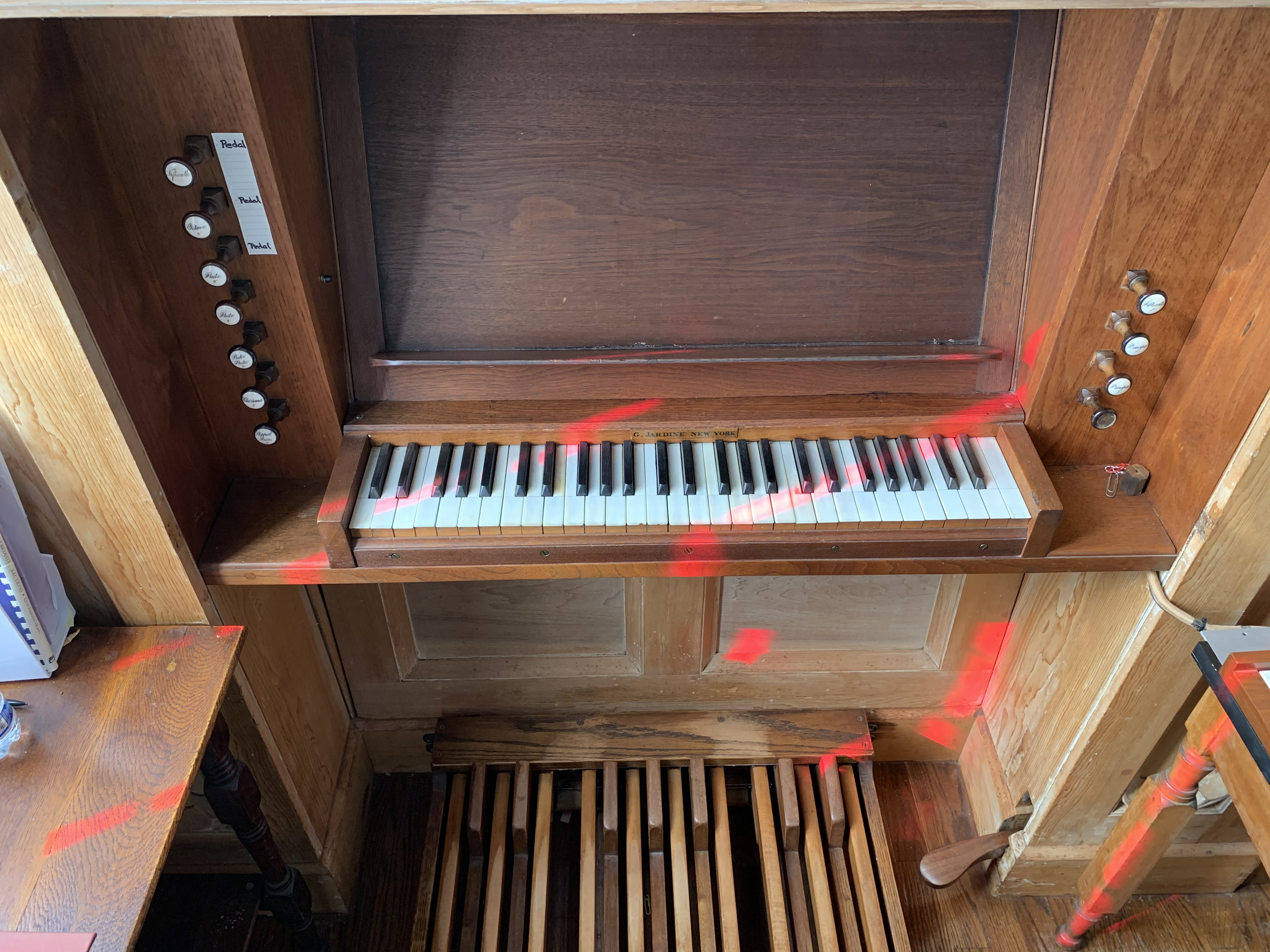
Console Jardine Tracker Organ, 1855. Christ Church, Bethlehem, CT. Taken in 2020

It is a pipe organ which uses tracker action with 6 ranks, 1 manual and a slider chest.

== The church today ==
As of 2020 the church maintains a part-time priest and conducts one service on Sunday mornings. Parishioners maintain ministries in assisting worship, providing prayer, and assisting local charities such as Caring for Bethlehem. They participate in local festivals, including the Bethlehem Town Fair and the Christmas Town Festival.

The brick church, built in the style of Greek Revival with bricks from the local Thompson's brickyard, faces east and rests on a stone foundation. Two stone steps lead to a double door which is slightly pointed. There are single windows on either side. Above the doorway is a paired window at the base of a square tower of wood. The tower contains a large bell. A small narthex contains narrow, curved staircases leading to a small balcony in the rear of the sanctuary. In the sanctuary, eight sets of pews flank a central aisle, and then a set of four stairs lead to an elevated chancel with a lectern and a pulpit. A final step at the rear of the chancel holds the altar. The organ is located on the main level at the southwest corner of the sanctuary.

The north and south walls hold three paired pointed windows of etched and colored glass. One of these is inscribed with a biblical inscription from Micah 6:8, "And what doth the Lord require of you, but to do Justice, to love Mercy, and to walk Humbly with thy God." The others are not inscribed. The triple window behind the altar contains the lamb triumphant (Agnus Dei) and sheaves and grapes. The ceiling of the sanctuary was lowered during renovations in 1871 to its present height. Evidence of this alteration can be seen in the different colors of the brick work on the exterior of the sanctuary. The roof of the sanctuary is made of metal, an unusual feature which was shared with the Congregational Church across the street, but now can be found only on one nearby house. This feature may date from the 20th century.

Behind the sanctuary on the level of the chancel are a small sacristy, two church offices, a meeting room, and access to a stone basement, all part of renovations in 1955 when the central aisle in the sanctuary was returned. A connecting hall (1983) runs north from the meeting room with bathrooms and a large kitchen to the Johnson Memorial Parish Hall. There is an access ramp to the connecting hallway from a memorial garden. The Parish Hall was built in 1931 and was named in honor of Albert E. Johnson, a senior warden of the church and town leader. The parish hall is built in the neo-colonial revival style and made of brick and clapboard. It has a gabled roof of asphalt shingles.
