= Bronson B. Tuttle House =

Historic house in Connecticut, United States

- U.S. National Register of Historic Places
- U.S. Historic district – Contributing property
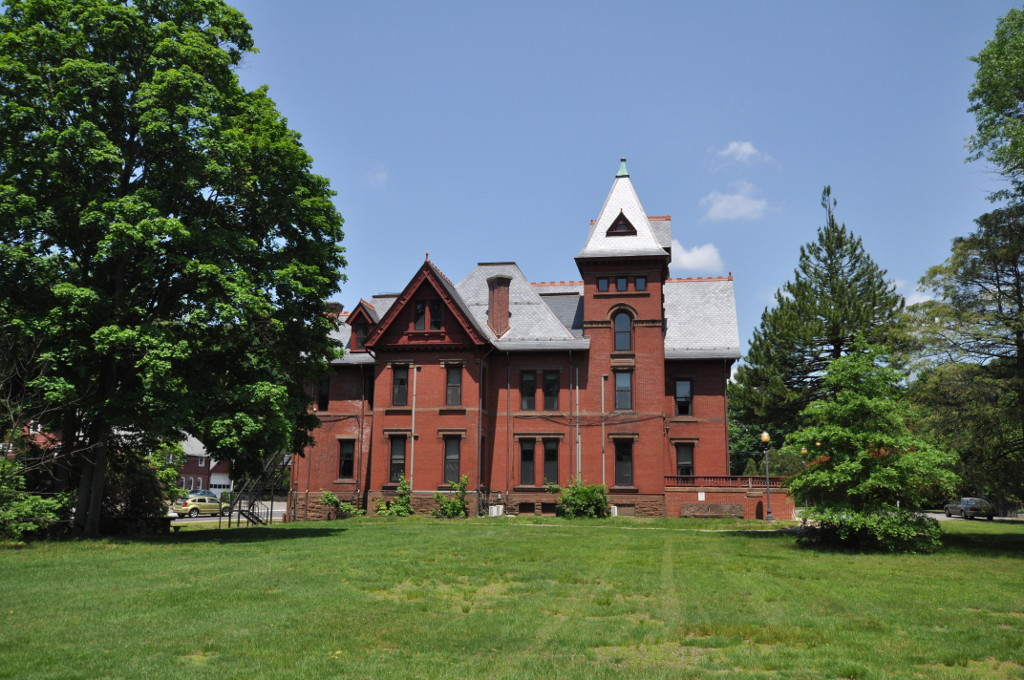

- Location within Connecticut Location within the United States
- Location: 380 Church Street, Naugatuck, Connecticut
- Coordinates: 41°29′43″N 73°03′19″W
- Area: 3.3 acres (1.3 ha)
- Built: 1879
- Architect: Hill, Robert Wakeman
- Architectural style: Queen Anne
- Part of: Naugatuck Center Historic District (ID99000859)
- NRHP reference No.: 90001803

Significant dates
- Added to NRHP: November 29, 1990
- Designated CP: July 30, 1999

The Bronson B. Tuttle House is a historic house at 380 Church Street in Naugatuck, Connecticut. Built in 1879 for a prominent local industrialist, it is a fine example of Queen Anne architecture in brick, and a well-preserved reminder of its 19th century industrial past. It was listed on the National Register of Historic Places in 1990. The building now houses the local historical society.

== Description and history ==
The Bronson B. Tuttle House stands about one-quarter mile north of Naugatuck's town center, in a prominent location at the junction of Meadow and Church Streets. The house is an irregular mass of red brick construction, with numerous projecting gables and porches. A porte-cochere projects from the northern facade, and a three-story tower rises at the southeast corner. The brickwork and wooden trim are of high quality workmanship. The interior continues the fine and elaborate finishes, which are found to a significant degree of preservation throughout the building. Across Meadow Street is the house's associated carriage barn, now occupied by the local senior center.

The house and barn were built in 1879–81 to a design by Waterbury architect Robert W. Hill. They were built for Bronson Tuttle, co-owner of a firm that manufactured cast iron parts and agricultural implements. The house remained in the Tuttle family until 1935, when it was given to the city. In the area where it now stands relatively isolated, there were once a series of high-style mansions, built by the town's industrial elites. It is the only one to survive.

== See also ==
- National Register of Historic Places listings in New Haven County, Connecticut
