= Hose and Hook and Ladder Truck Building =

- U.S. National Register of Historic Places
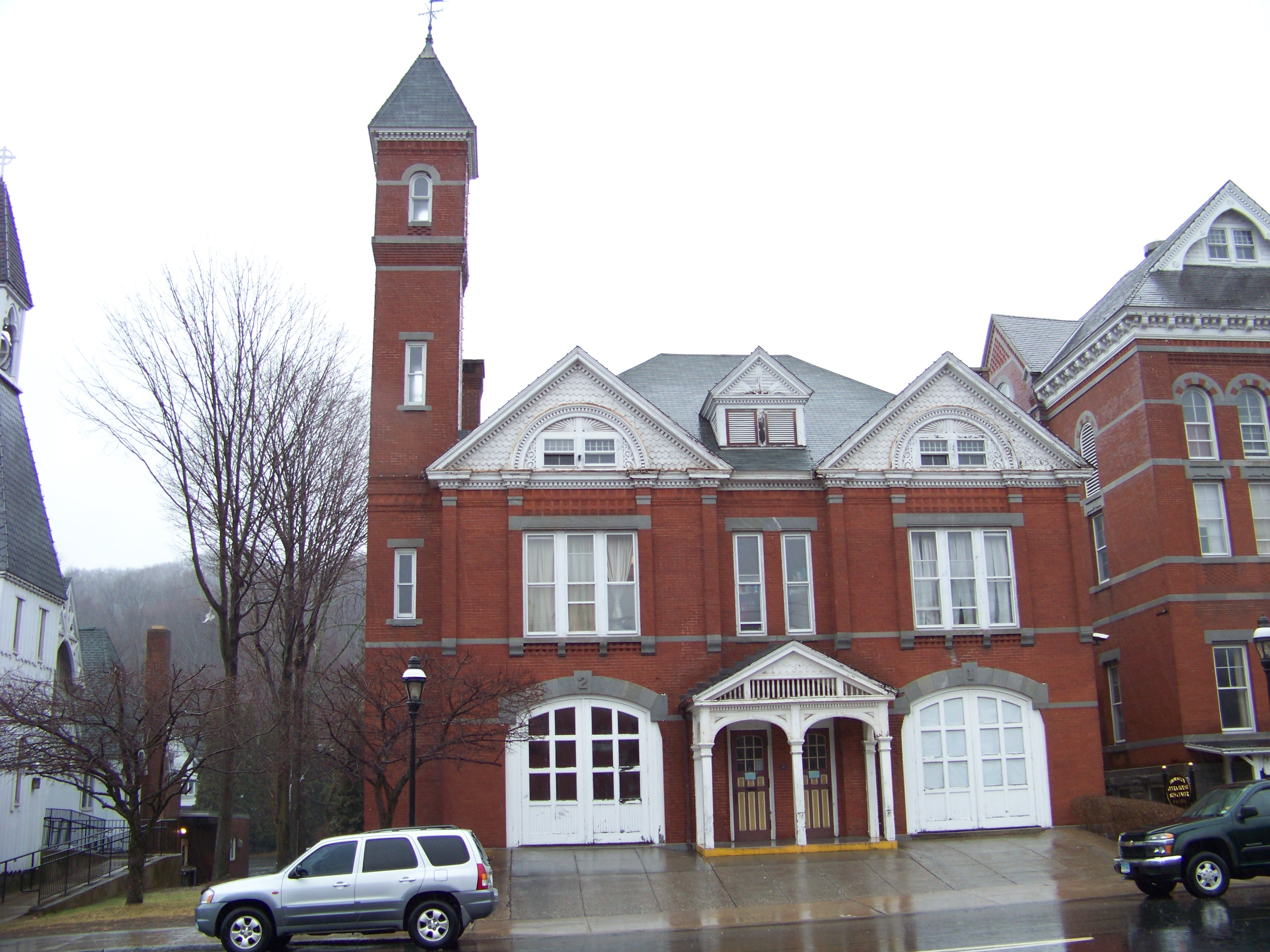

- Location within Connecticut Location within the United States
- Location: Main Street, Thomaston, Connecticut
- Coordinates: 41°40′22″N 73°4′33″W
- Area: less than one acre
- Built: 1882
- Architect: Hill, Robert W.
- Architectural style: Queen Anne
- NRHP reference No.: 82004479
- Added to NRHP: January 4, 1982

The Hose and Hook and Ladder Truck Building is a historic former firehouse on Main Street in Thomaston, Connecticut. Built in 1882, it is a fine example of Late Victorian civic architecture in brick. It was listed on the National Register of Historic Places on January 4, 1982. After serving as a firehouse for about a century, it has been converted into an art gallery.

== Description and history ==
The former Hose and Hook and Ladder Truck Building stands in a prominent location in central Thomaston, between the town hall/opera house and Trinity Church, two other architecturally distinguished buildings. It is a 2 1/2-story brick structure with granite trim, and a prominent Venetian-style tower with a pyramidal roof. It is basically symmetrical except for the tower, with vehicle bays flanking a pair of pedestrian entrances, which share a protective portico with Victorian arched friezes and spindled woodwork in the gable above. Brick pilasters articulate the elements of the building's second floor, with matching gabled projections above the vehicle bays. The gable ends are finished in decorative shingles, which surround half-round arches containing paired sash windows.

The building was built in 1882 to a design by Waterbury architect Robert Wakeman Hill, whose credits include the adjacent opera house (1883-5). It served the town as a firehouse until 1979. The brick used was produced by the Seth Thomas family brickyard nearby. The companies that first occupied the building were volunteer firefighting forces.

== See also ==
- National Register of Historic Places listings in Litchfield County, Connecticut
