= Trinity Church (Thomaston, Connecticut) =

Historic church in Connecticut, United States

- U.S. National Register of Historic Places
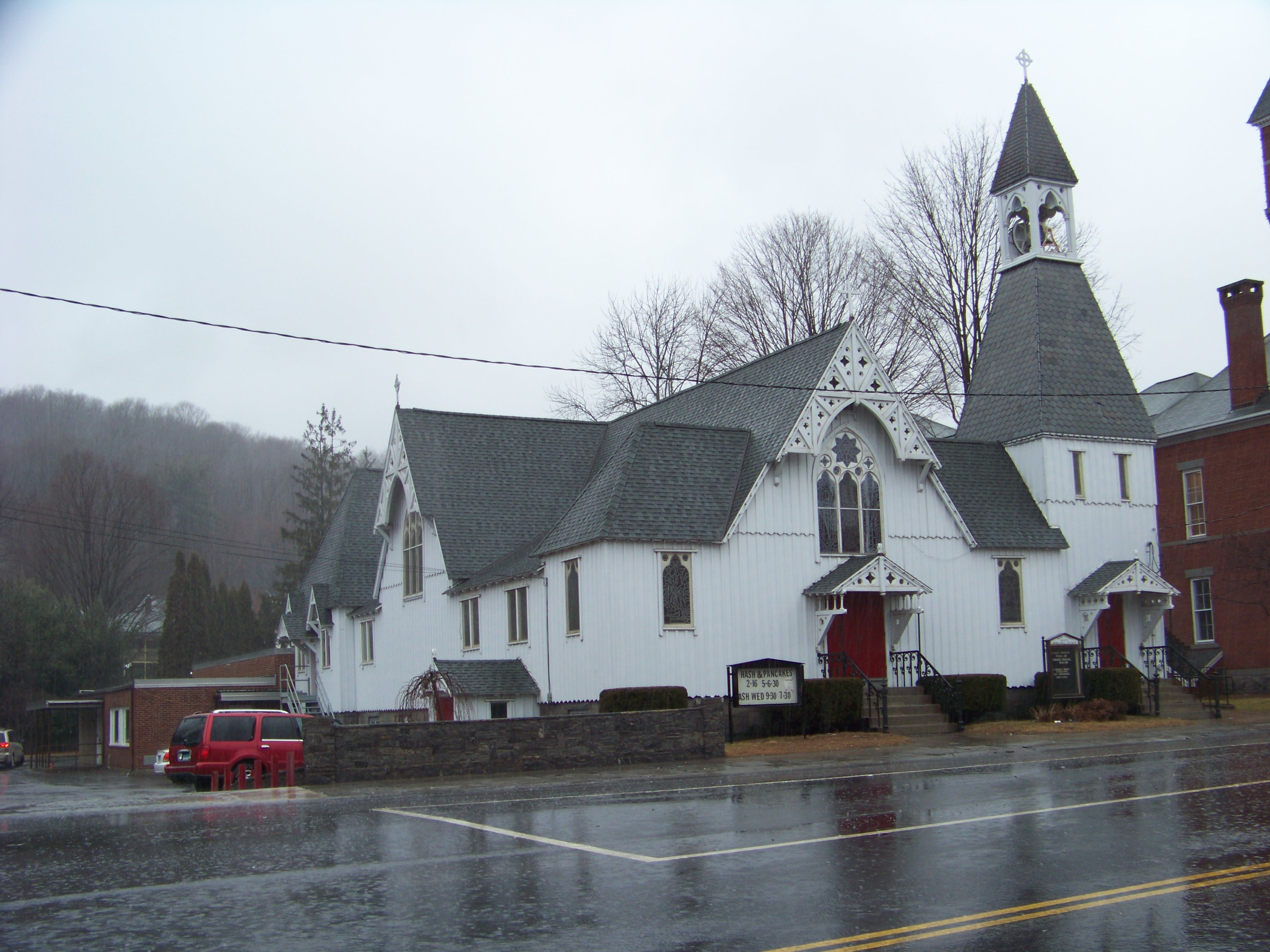

- Location within Connecticut Location within the United States
- Location: 160 Main Street, Thomaston, Connecticut
- Coordinates: 41°40′21″N 73°4′32″W
- Area: 0.6 acres (0.24 ha)
- Built: 1871
- Architect: Richard M. Upjohn
- Architectural style: Stick/Eastlake
- NRHP reference No.: 84001097
- Added to NRHP: August 1, 1984

Trinity Church is a historic episcopal church at 160 Main Street in Thomaston, Connecticut. Built in two stages, 1871 and 1880, to a design by Richard M. Upjohn, it is a good example of Gothic and Stick Style architecture. The church was listed on the National Register of Historic Places in 1984. It is now part of a merged parish with St. Peter's of Plymouth.

The church reported 79 members in 2015 and 35 members in 2023; no membership statistics were reported in 2024 parochial reports. Plate and pledge income for the congregation in 2024 was $133,594 with average Sunday attendance (ASA) of 35.

== Description and history ==
Trinity Church is prominently located in the center of Thomaston, between the opera house and the public library on the north side of Main Street. It is a wood frame Stick style structure, with a complex roof line and a board-and-batten exterior that is a modern aluminum covering for the original, which lies underneath. Its main roof has a front-facing gable, from which cross gables at full height extend, giving a basically cruciform shape to the roof. At the front there is a hip-roofed extension to the left, and a gabled extension to the right that ends in the square tower. A larger hip-roofed cross section extends at the back of the main building. The tower is square for two stories, then begins a steeply pitched roof section that ends in an open belfry, with a small pyramidal roof at the top. Stick decorations adorn its gables. The interior is modestly decorated, with exposed curved roof trusses, and decorative woodwork in the chancel area.

The church was designed by Richard M. Upjohn, and is in some respects a continuation of his father's promotion of the Gothic Revival, albeit in a more modern sense. The younger Upjohn's best-known work is the Connecticut State Capitol, and he had already designed four similar churches when he created the design for the Thomaston church, which is larger and more elaborate than those earlier designs.

== See also ==
- National Register of Historic Places listings in Litchfield County, Connecticut
