= Thomaston, Connecticut =

- Town
- Town of Thomaston
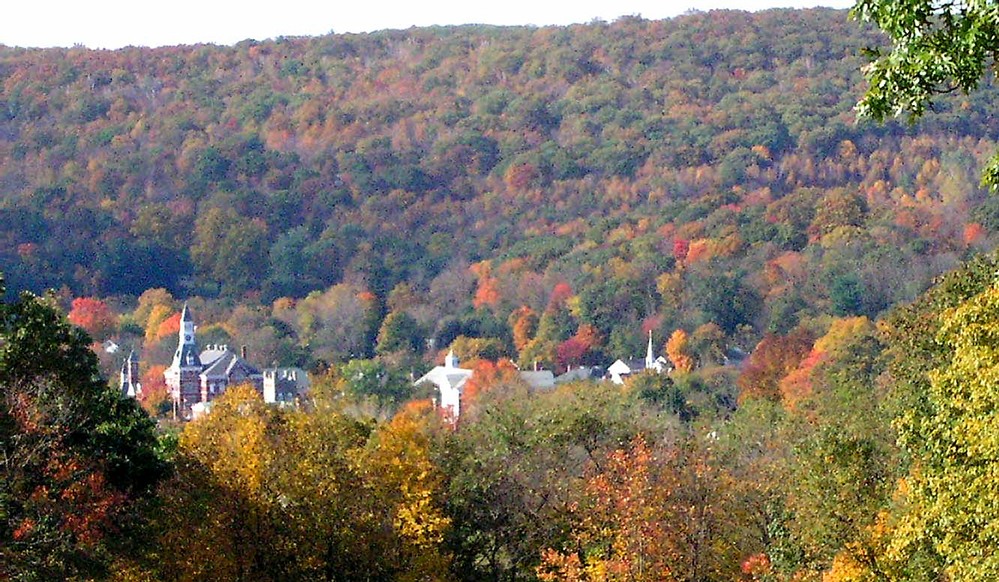
- Autumn 2003 view of Thomaston from Plymouth

- Seal
- Motto: "A Town For All Time..."
- Coordinates: 41°40′15″N 73°04′57″W
- Country: United States
- U.S. state: Connecticut
- County: Litchfield
- Region: Naugatuck Valley
- Incorporated: 1875

Government
  - Type: Selectman-town meeting
  - First selectman: Edmond V. Mone (R)
  - Selectman: Michael Burr (R)
  - Selectman: Jeffrey Dunn (D)

Area
  - Total: 12.2 sq mi (31.6 km^{2})
  - Land: 12.0 sq mi (31.0 km^{2})
  - Water: 0.23 sq mi (0.6 km^{2})
- Elevation: 446 ft (136 m)

Population (2020)
  - Total: 7,442
  - Density: 622/sq mi (240.1/km^{2})
- Time zone: UTC-5 (Eastern)
  - Summer (DST): UTC-4 (Eastern)
- ZIP codes: 06787
- Area codes: 860/959
- FIPS code: 09-75730
- GNIS feature ID: 0213515
- Website: www.thomastonct.org

Thomaston is a town in Litchfield County, Connecticut, United States. The town is part of the Naugatuck Valley Planning Region. The population was 7,442 at the 2020 census. The urban center of the town is the Thomaston census-designated place, with a population of 1,928 at the 2020 census.

== History ==
The town, originally part of the town of Plymouth and referred to as "Plymouth Hollow", was first settled by Henry Cook ("the soldier in the wilderness", 1683–1750) around 1728. The town is known for clockmaking, which started in 1803, when Eli Terry established a factory in the town. Terry brought mass production to the clockmaking industry, helping to reduce the cost of clocks. He introduced and patented the shelf clock in 1814, which reduced the cost of a clock from $25 to $5. His clocks were sold throughout the United States.

The town was incorporated in its own right and under the name "Thomaston" in 1875. The name derives from Seth Thomas, the early clockmaker, who established a factory in town in 1812. The Seth Thomas clock factory building still exists; however, the clockmaking industry has long since left the state as well as the country.

== Geography ==
Thomaston is in southeastern Litchfield County, bordered on the south by the city of Waterbury in New Haven County. Thomaston is somewhat of a border town between Litchfield and New Haven Counties. According to the United States Census Bureau, the town has a total area of 12.2 square miles (31.6 km^{2}), of which 12.0 square miles (31.0 km^{2}) are land and 0.2 square miles (0.6 km^{2}) (1.94%) are water.

The town is located at the confluence of the Naugatuck River, Northfield Brook and Black Rock Brook, and is protected by U.S. Army Corps of Engineers flood control dams on each of these watercourses. These were all constructed in the years immediately following the devastating flood of 1955 which ravaged the town as well as the state in general.

On the town's geography itself, immediately approaching the bridge along East Main Street overlooking the Train Station and Railroad Museum, is an industrial region within the town, thus occupying the central part of the town, which is also the area of the town which, along Main Street, in the past was home to many restaurants and convenience stores, although whether due to poor business, landlord disputes, or accidents, many of these restaurants have since closed (It is important, however, to note that when one restaurant closes, usually another opens in its absence).

=== Principal communities ===
- Reynolds Bridge
- Downtown
- Highwood Farms
- Hickory Hill
- High Street Extension

=== Adjacent towns and city ===
- Litchfield (north)
- Harwinton (northeast)
- Plymouth (east)
- Waterbury (south)
- Watertown (southwest)
- Morris (west)
- Northfield (north)

== Demographics ==
Historical population
| Census | Pop. | Note | %± |
|---|---|---|---|
| 1880 | 3,225 | | — |
| 1890 | 3,278 | | 1.6% |
| 1900 | 3,300 | | 0.7% |
| 1910 | 3,533 | | 7.1% |
| 1920 | 3,993 | | 13.0% |
| 1930 | 4,188 | | 4.9% |
| 1940 | 4,238 | | 1.2% |
| 1950 | 4,896 | | 15.5% |
| 1960 | 5,850 | | 19.5% |
| 1970 | 6,233 | | 6.5% |
| 1980 | 6,276 | | 0.7% |
| 1990 | 6,947 | | 10.7% |
| 2000 | 7,503 | | 8.0% |
| 2010 | 7,887 | | 5.1% |
| 2020 | 7,442 | | −5.6% |
U.S. Decennial Census

As of the census of 2000, there were 7,503 people, 2,916 households, and 2,067 families residing in the town. The population density was 624.7 inhabitants per square mile (241.2/km^{2}). There were 3,014 housing units at an average density of 251.0 per square mile (96.9/km^{2}). The racial makeup of the town was 97.85% White, Hispanic or Latino of any race were 1.45% of the population, 0.60% African American, 0.11% Native American, 0.49% Asian, 0.02% Pacific Islander, 0.41% from other races, and 0.53% from two or more races.

There were 2,916 households, out of which 34.3% had children under the age of 18 living with them, 57.5% were married couples living together, 9.2% had a female householder with no husband present, and 29.1% were non-families. 24.0% of all households were made up of individuals, and 9.7% had someone living alone who was 65 years of age or older. The average household size was 2.57 and the average family size was 3.07.

In the town, the population was spread out, with 25.3% under the age of 18, 6.2% from 18 to 24, 33.2% from 25 to 44, 23.2% from 45 to 64, and 12.1% who were 65 years of age or older. The median age was 38 years. For every 100 females, there were 97.2 males. For every 100 females age 18 and over, there were 94.8 males.

The median income for a household in the town was $54,297, and the median income for a family was $63,682. Males had a median income of $40,795 versus $31,744 for females. The per capita income for the town was $24,799. 4.2% of the population and 3.3% of families were below the poverty line. Of the total population, 5.8% of those under the age of 18 and 4.5% of those 65 and older were living below the poverty line.

== Transportation ==
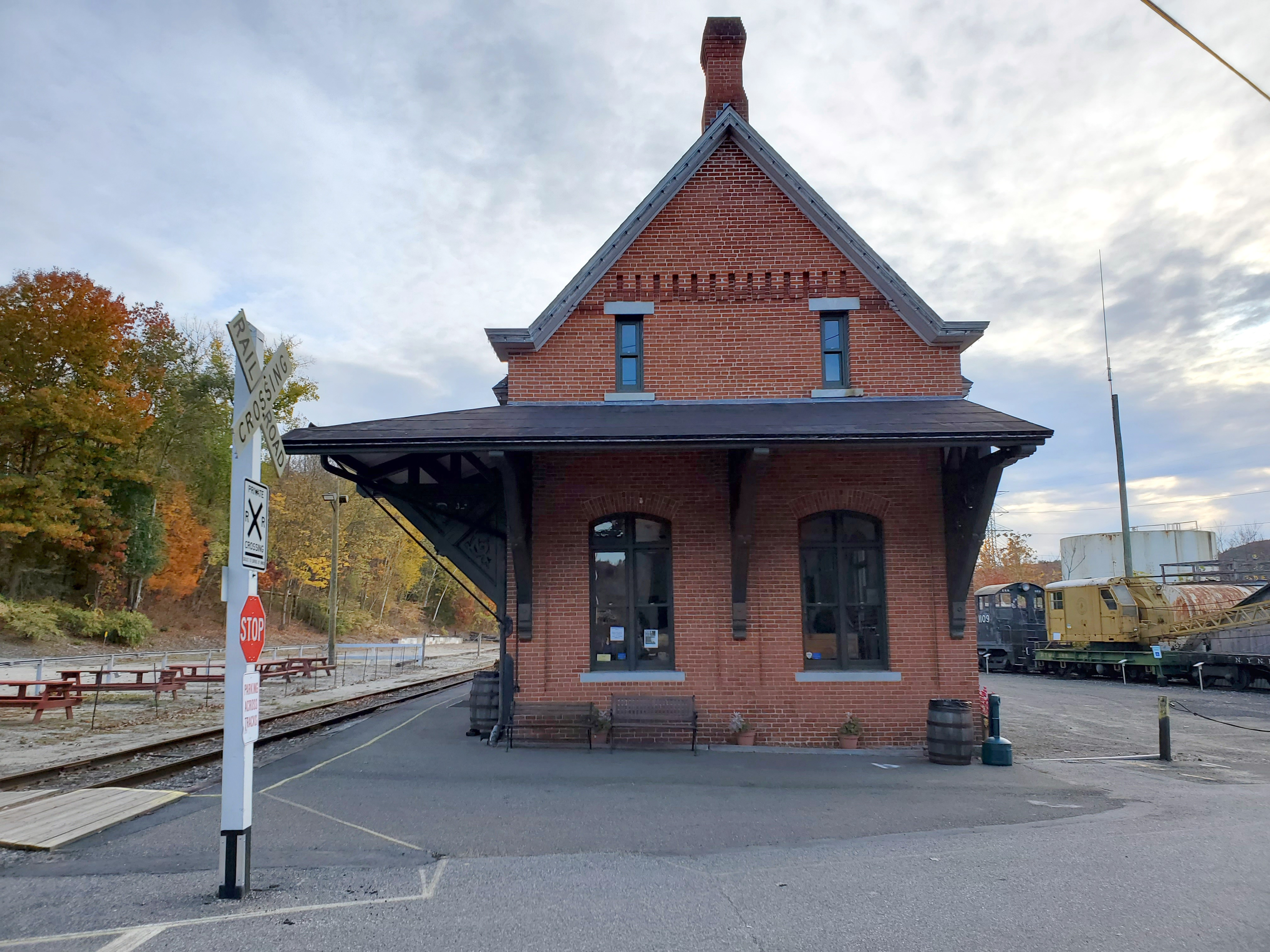
Thomaston station on the Naugatuck Railroad

The Route 8 expressway runs along the Naugatuck River in the eastern part of town and has three exits in Thomaston. Other state highways in the town are Route 6, Route 109, Route 222, and Route 254. Thomaston is headquarters of the Naugatuck Railroad, a heritage railway and short line freight operator that operates 21 miles (34 km) of former New Haven trackage between Waterbury and Torrington. Interchange is with Pan Am Railways at Highland Junction.

== Schools ==
The town is home to Thomaston High School, a school with roughly up to 375 students, from grade 7 to 12. It is also home to Black Rock Elementary School, hosting Pre-K to 3rd grade, and Thomaston Center School, hosting the town's 4th, 5th, and 6th grade students.

== Landmarks ==
- Hose and Hook and Ladder Truck Building
- Railroad Museum of New England
- Thomaston Opera House
- Trinity Church

== Notable people ==
- Thomas D. Bradstreet (1841–1915), state representative, state senator, state comptroller
- Michael J. McGivney (1852–1890), Roman Catholic priest and founder of the Knights of Columbus; died in Thomaston
- Grattan O'Connell (1902–1942), early professional football player; born in Thomaston
- Thomas James Reeves (1895–1941), US Navy radioman killed during the December 7, 1941, attack on Pearl Harbor and posthumously awarded the Medal of Honor; born in Thomaston
- Seth Thomas (1785–1859), 19th-century American clockmaker and pioneer of mass production; the town is named after him
