= Aetna Hose, Hook and Ladder Company, Fire Station No. 2 =

- Aetna Hose, Hook and Ladder Company Fire Station No. 2
- U.S. National Register of Historic Places
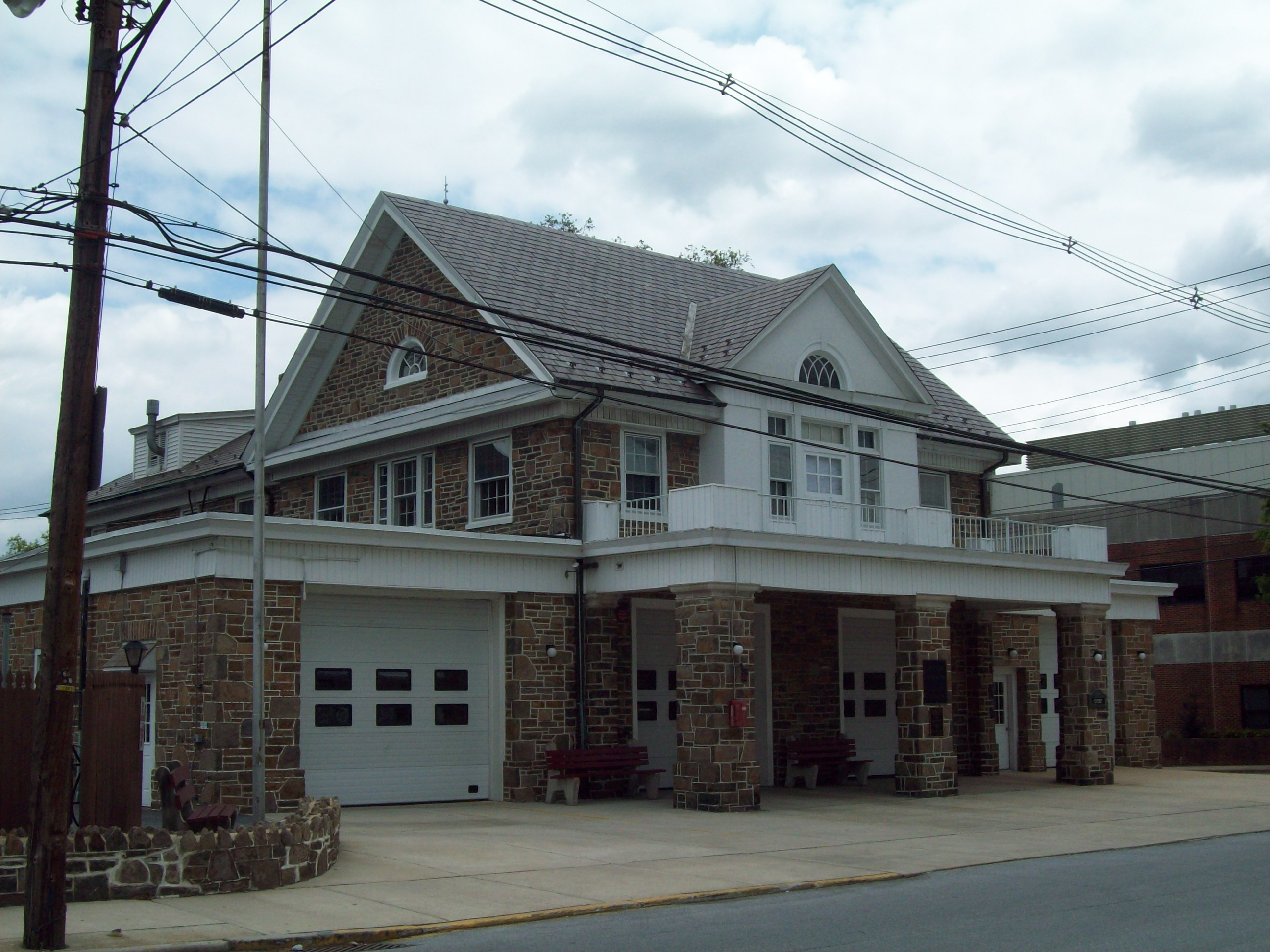
- Aetna Hose, Hook and Ladder Company Fire Station No. 2, April 2010

- Location within Delaware Location within the United States
- Location: 31 Academy St., Newark, Delaware
- Coordinates: 39.682181°N 75.749142°W
- Area: 0.4 acres (0.16 ha)
- Built: 1922
- Architects: Hope, Clarence; Willis, J.C.
- Architectural style: Classical Revival
- MPS: Newark MRA
- NRHP reference No.: 82002334
- Added to NRHP: May 7, 1982

Aetna Hose, Hook and Ladder Company, Fire Station No. 2 is a historic fire station located at Newark in New Castle County, Delaware. It was built in 1922 and is a two-story ashlar structure with secondary wings on three sides. It features a gable roof with frame cupola.

The four engine bays facing Academy Street house a tiller ladder, two modern engines, and the company's restored 1926 Seagrave engine "Old Bessie" which is used for parades and other special events.

It was listed on the National Register of Historic Places in 1982.

== See also ==
- Aetna Hose, Hook and Ladder Company Fire Station No. 1
- National Register of Historic Places listings in Newark, Delaware
