= Keystone Hook and Ladder Company =

- U.S. National Register of Historic Places
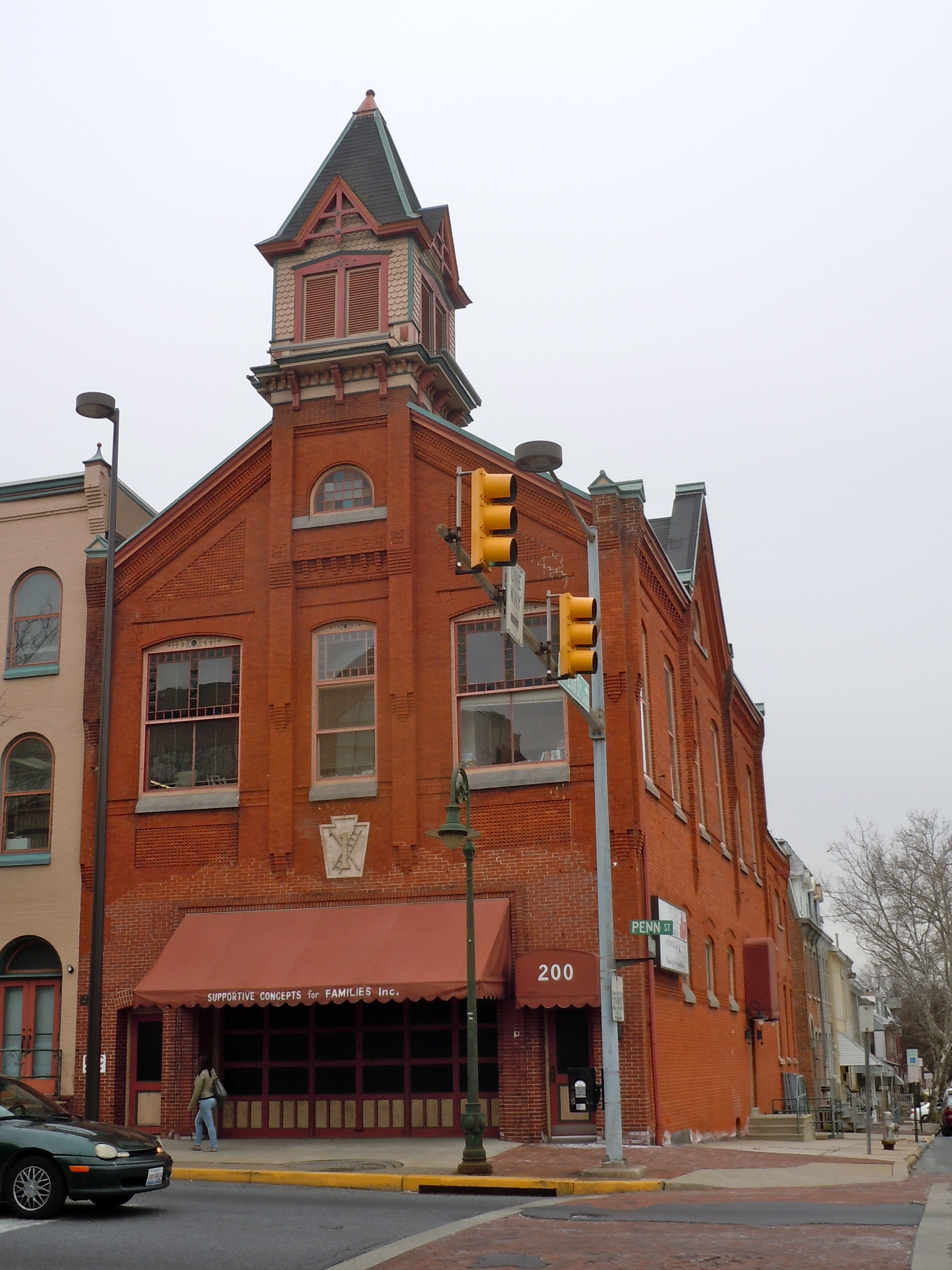
- Keystone Hook and Ladder Company, March 2011

- Location within Pennsylvania Location within the United States
- Location: Second and Penn Streets, Reading, Pennsylvania
- Coordinates: 40°20′6″N 75°56′1″W
- Area: 0.1 acres (0.040 ha)
- Built: 1886-1887
- Architect: Mull, E.K.
- Architectural style: Queen Anne
- NRHP reference No.: 85003447
- Added to NRHP: October 31, 1985

Keystone Hook and Ladder Company is a historic fire station located at Reading, Berks County, Pennsylvania. It was built in 1886–1887, and is a two-story, brick building in the Queen Anne style. A two-story annex was added in 1888 or 1890. The front facade features a wooden bell tower with a pyramidal roof.

It was listed on the National Register of Historic Places in 1985.
