= Hook and Ladder No. 1 and Hose Co. No. 2 =

- U.S. National Register of Historic Places
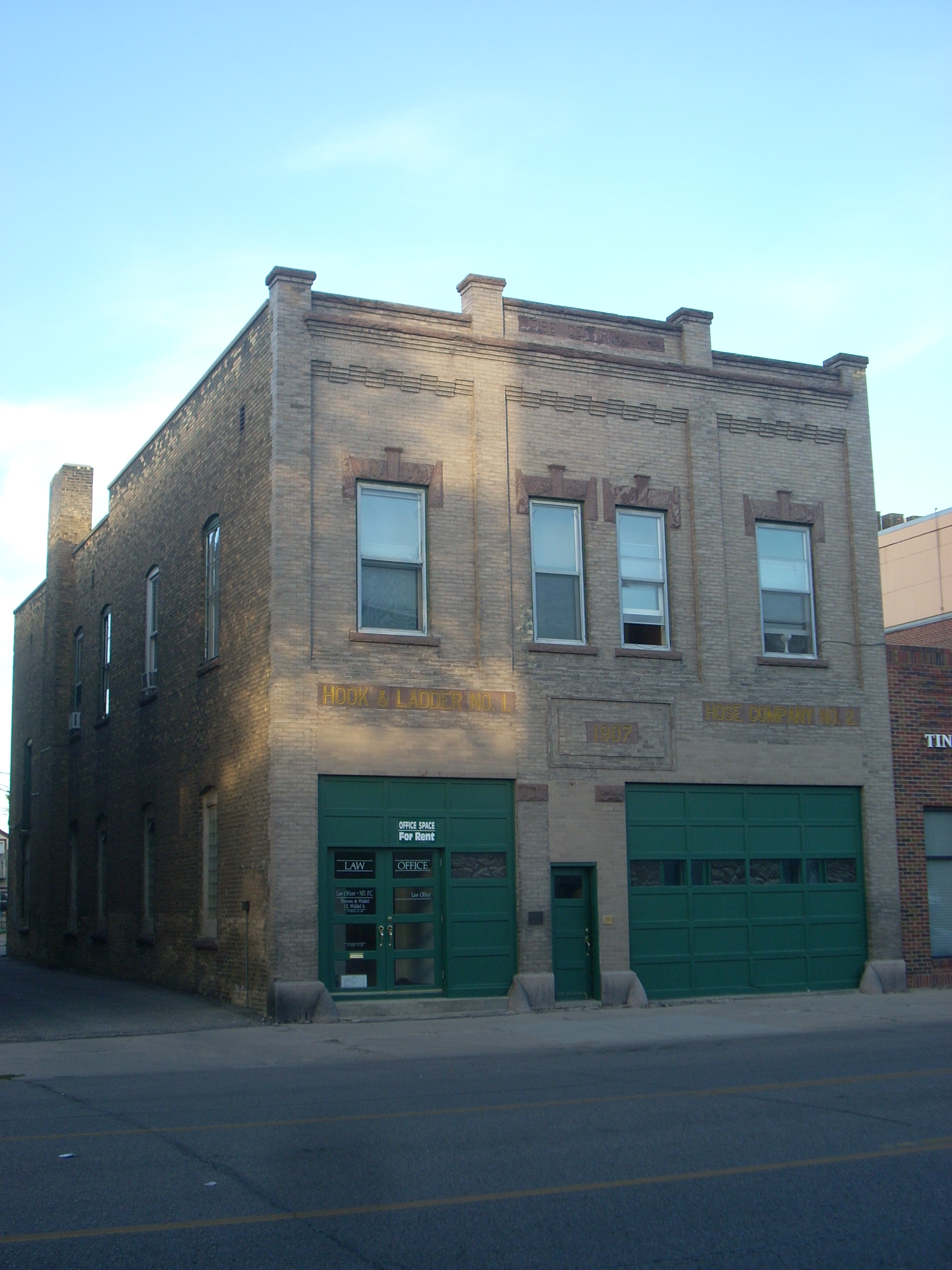
- Building in 2009

- Location within North Dakota Location within the United States
- Location: 215 S. 4th St., Grand Forks, North Dakota
- Coordinates: 47°55′21″N 97°1′40″W
- Area: less than 1 acre (0.40 ha)
- Built: 1907
- MPS: Downtown Grand Forks MRA
- NRHP reference No.: 82001328
- Added to NRHP: October 26, 1982

The Hook and Ladder No. 1 and Hose Co. No. 2 is a property in Grand Forks, North Dakota that was listed on the National Register of Historic Places in 1982. It is locally significant as one of two fire stations built by the city in 1907. The other, at time of NRHP nomination, was condemned.

It is no longer used as a fire station.

The property was covered in a 1981 study of Downtown Grand Forks historical resources.
