= Cold Spring Harbor Fire District Hook and Ladder Company Building =

- U.S. National Register of Historic Places
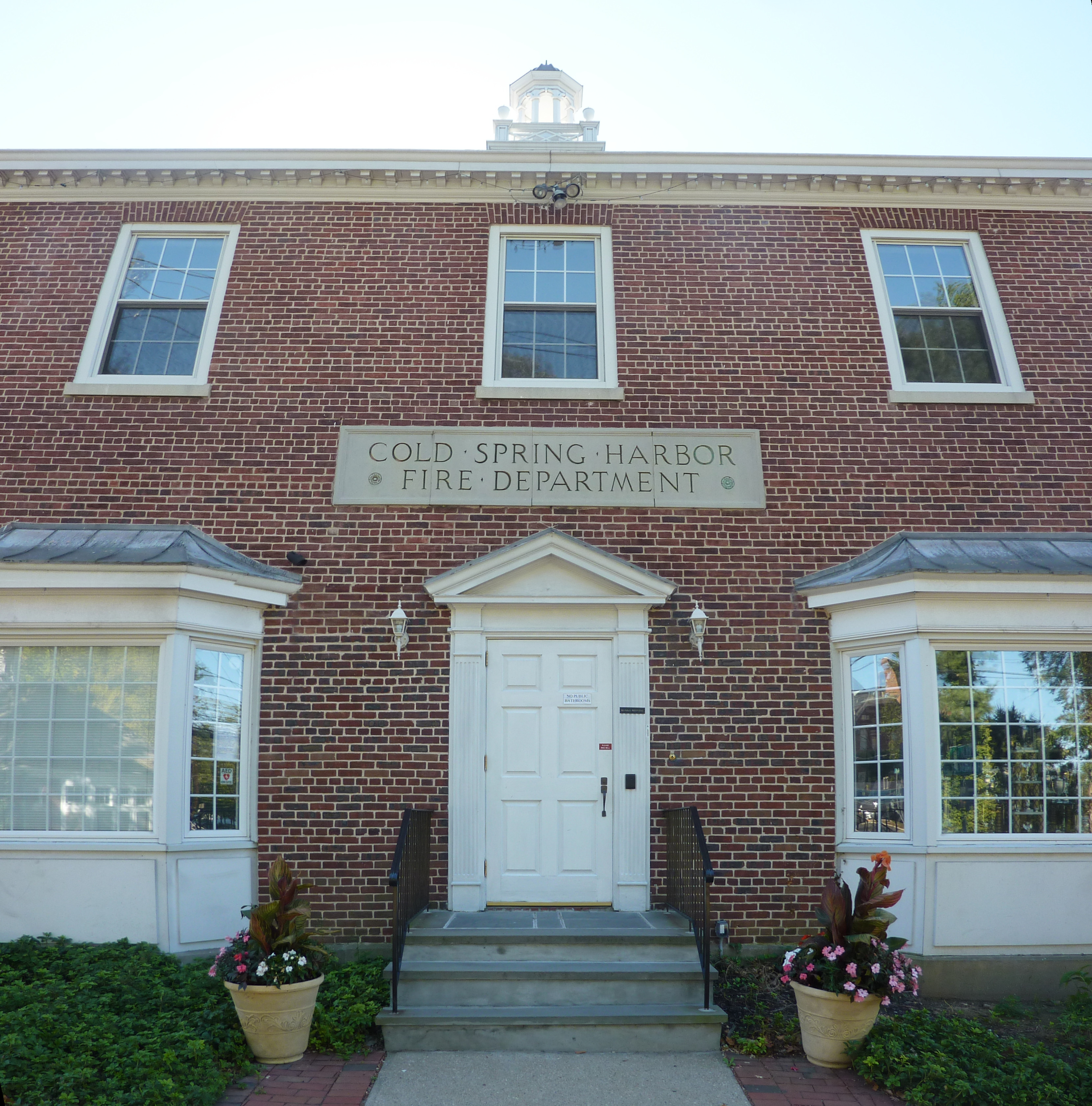
- The 1970-built fire house

- Location within New York Location within the United States
- Location: Main St. at Elm Place, Cold Spring Harbor, New York
- Coordinates: 40°52′10″N 73°27′39″W
- Area: less than one acre
- Built: 1896
- NRHP reference No.: 03001147
- Added to NRHP: November 15, 2003

Cold Spring Harbor Fire District Hook and Ladder Company Building is a historic fire station located at Cold Spring Harbor in Suffolk County, New York. It was built about 1880 as a harness shop and adapted in 1896 to house the equipment of the newly formed Cold Spring Harbor fire department. It is a one-story, wood-framed building with a gable roof. It was moved to the rear of the lot on which it is located in 1930.

It was added to the National Register of Historic Places in 2003.
