= Aetna Hose, Hook and Ladder Company Fire Station No. 1 =

- Aetna Hose, Hook and Ladder Company, Fire Station No. 1
- U.S. National Register of Historic Places
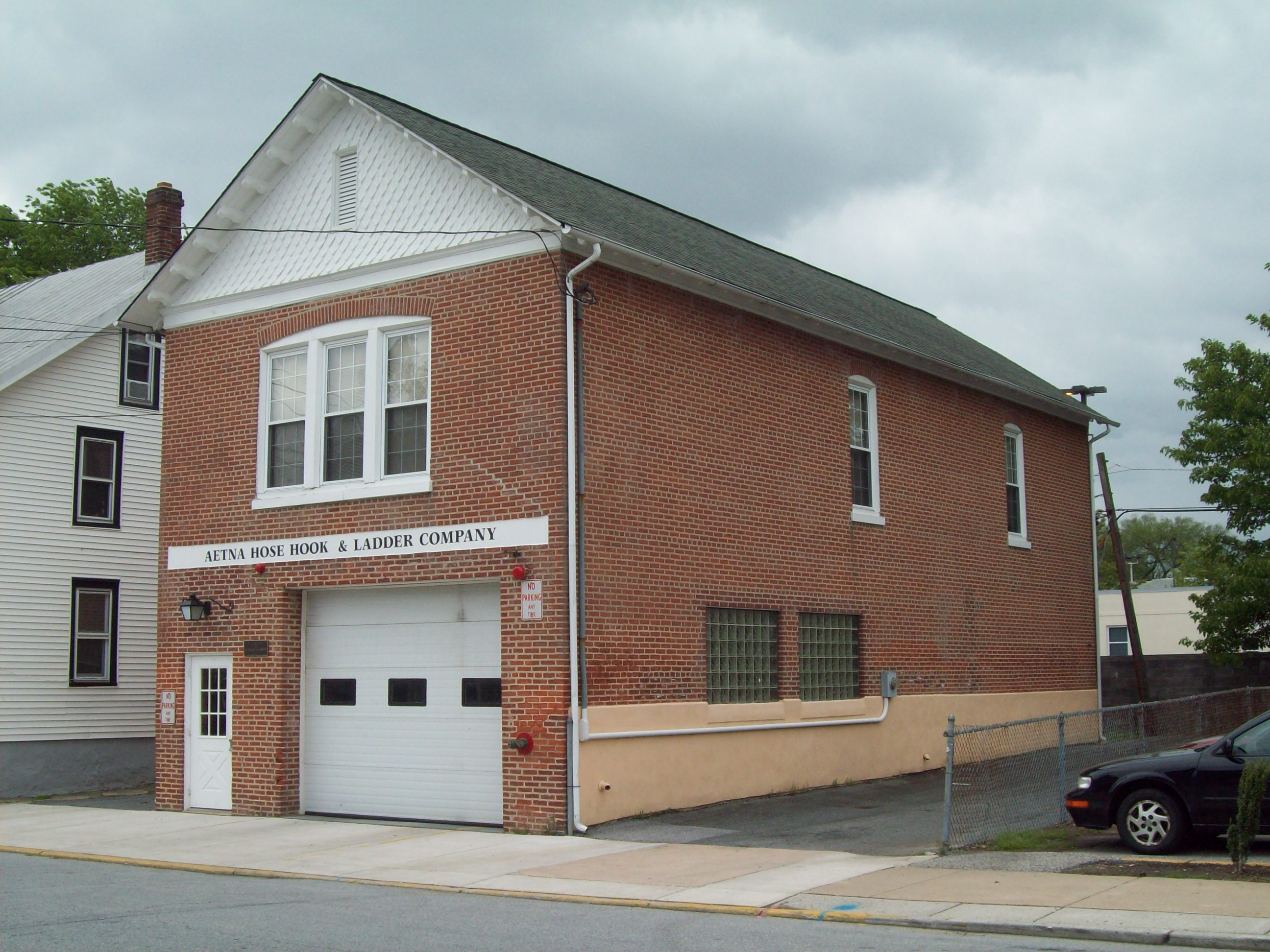
- Aetna Hose, Hook and Ladder Company, Fire Station No. 1, April 2010

- Location within Delaware Location within the United States
- Location: 26 Academy St., Newark, Delaware
- Coordinates: 39.682413°N 75.749623°W
- Area: 0.1 acres (0.040 ha)
- Built: 1890
- Architects: Miller, William D.
- MPS: Newark MRA
- NRHP reference No.: 82002335
- Added to NRHP: May 7, 1982

Aetna Hose, Hook and Ladder Company, Fire Station No. 1 is a historic fire station located at Newark in New Castle County, Delaware, USA. It was built in 1890 and is a two-story, rectangular common brick building. It has two main bays on the east gable end facade. It served as the city's sole fire fighting facility until the 1920s. The station currently houses 2 ambulances to complement the fire fighting apparatus located at the station across the street.

It was listed on the National Register of Historic Places in 1982.

== See also ==
- Aetna Hose, Hook and Ladder Company, Fire Station No. 2
- National Register of Historic Places listings in Newark, Delaware
