= Naugatuck Center Historic District =

Historic center of Naugatuck, Connecticut, United States

- U.S. National Register of Historic Places
- U.S. Historic district
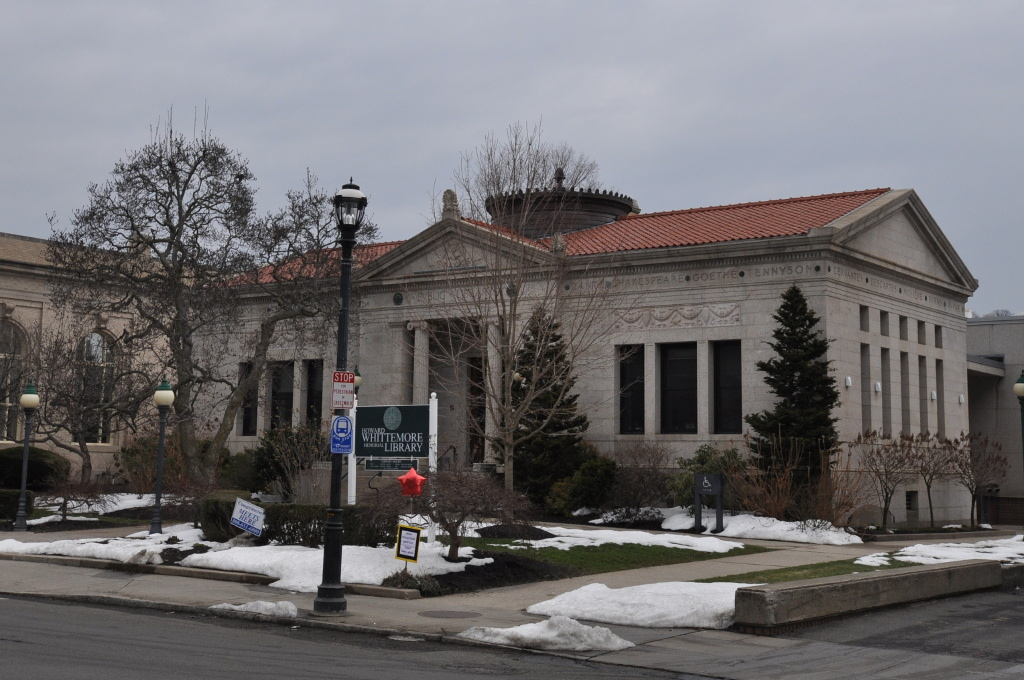
- The Whittemore Library

- Location within Connecticut Location within the United States
- Location: Roughly bounded by Fairview Avenue, Hillside Avenue, Terrace Avenue, Water Street, and Pleasant View Street, Naugatuck, Connecticut
- Coordinates: 41°29′29″N 73°3′27″W
- Area: 80 acres (32 ha)
- NRHP reference No.: 99000859
- Added to NRHP: July 30, 1999

The Naugatuck Center Historic District encompasses the historic civic and business center of Naugatuck, Connecticut. Centered around the town green, the district includes churches, schools and municipal buildings, many from the late 19th or early 20th centuries, as well as a diversity of residential architecture. The district was listed on the National Register of Historic Places in 1999.

== Description and history ==
The town of Naugatuck was settled in the 17th century, and developed primarily as an area of dispersed industrial activity, with saw and gristmills powered by the Naugatuck River and its tributaries. It was incorporated in 1844. Unlike many New England communities, its town center did not form around a church site, but developed around the green, which was donated to the town by an innkeeper in 1831. Two church congregations then moved their buildings there, and it then developed as a civic and business center. Its built infrastructure is dominated by industrial successes of the late 19th century, predominantly in the manufacture of rubber products by Charles Goodyear, and in malleable iron products manufactured by John Whittemore and Bronson Tuttle. Whittemore made many civic contributions, retaining McKim, Mead & White to design no less than eleven civic and private buildings in the town.

The historic district encompasses much of the civic and institutional core of downtown Naugatuck. It extends south from the junction of Church, Water, and Meadow Streets, all of which eventually run south, forming spines of the district. Terrace Avenue and Fairview Avenue form the western side of the district, whose southern boundary is an east–west line roughly at Pleasant View Avenue. A finger extends eastward along Cedar Street to include the town's Spanish Revival railroad station. Prominent buildings in the district include the Whittemore Library, a McKim, Mead & White design, the main post office, like the railroad station in a Spanish Revival style, and the Bronson B. Tuttle House, located at the northernmost end of the district. The Tuttle House is a fine brick Victorian mansion, and the only major industrialist's residence to survive in the city.

== See also ==
- National Register of Historic Places listings in New Haven County, Connecticut
