= Thomaston Opera House =

- U.S. National Register of Historic Places
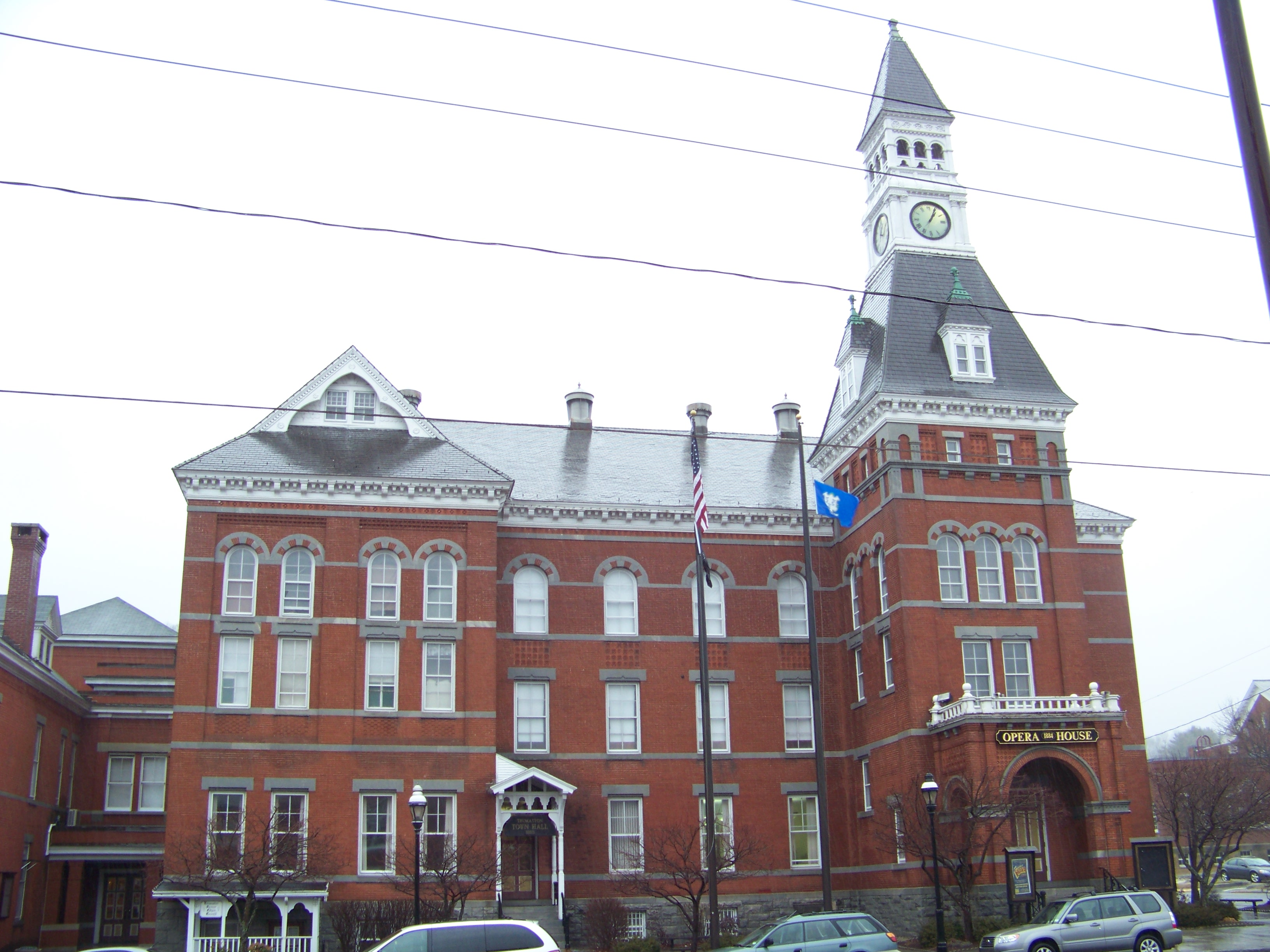

- Location within Connecticut Location within the United States
- Location: 153 Main Street, Thomaston, Connecticut
- Coordinates: 41°40′23″N 73°4′32″W
- Area: less than one acre
- Built: 1883
- NRHP reference No.: 72001319
- Added to NRHP: April 26, 1972

The Thomaston Opera House is a historic performance venue and the town hall of Thomaston, Connecticut. Located at 153 Main Street, it was built in 1883-85, and is a good local example of Romanesque architecture. The theater in the building has served as a performance and film venue since its construction. It was listed on the National Register of Historic Places in 1972. The opera house's principal tenant is now the Landmark Community Theatre.

== Description and history ==
The Thomaston Opera House is prominently sited in Thomaston's downtown, at the southwest corner of Main and Clay Streets. It is a large three-story brick building with Romanesque features and a hip roof. Its dominant feature is a multi-stage square tower, rising through five levels to a clock stage, open belfry with triple-arched openings, and crowning pyramidal roof and weathervane. The roof cornice is adorned with dentil moulding and modillion blocks. The third-floor windows are set in round-arch openings with contrasting brick and stone arches.

The building was designed by Robert Hill of Waterbury and built in 1883-85 on land donated by Aaron Thomas, the son of the town's namesake, Seth Thomas. It was used as a venue for theatrical performances and social events until the 1930s, when it was converted for a time into a movie house. It was closed down due to safety code violations in the 1960s, and underwent restoration, reopening with town offices on the first floor and the theater continuing on the upper floor. It is now used for live theatrical productions and other events.

== See also ==
- National Register of Historic Places listings in Litchfield County, Connecticut
