= Hamilton Park (Waterbury, Connecticut) =

- U.S. National Register of Historic Places
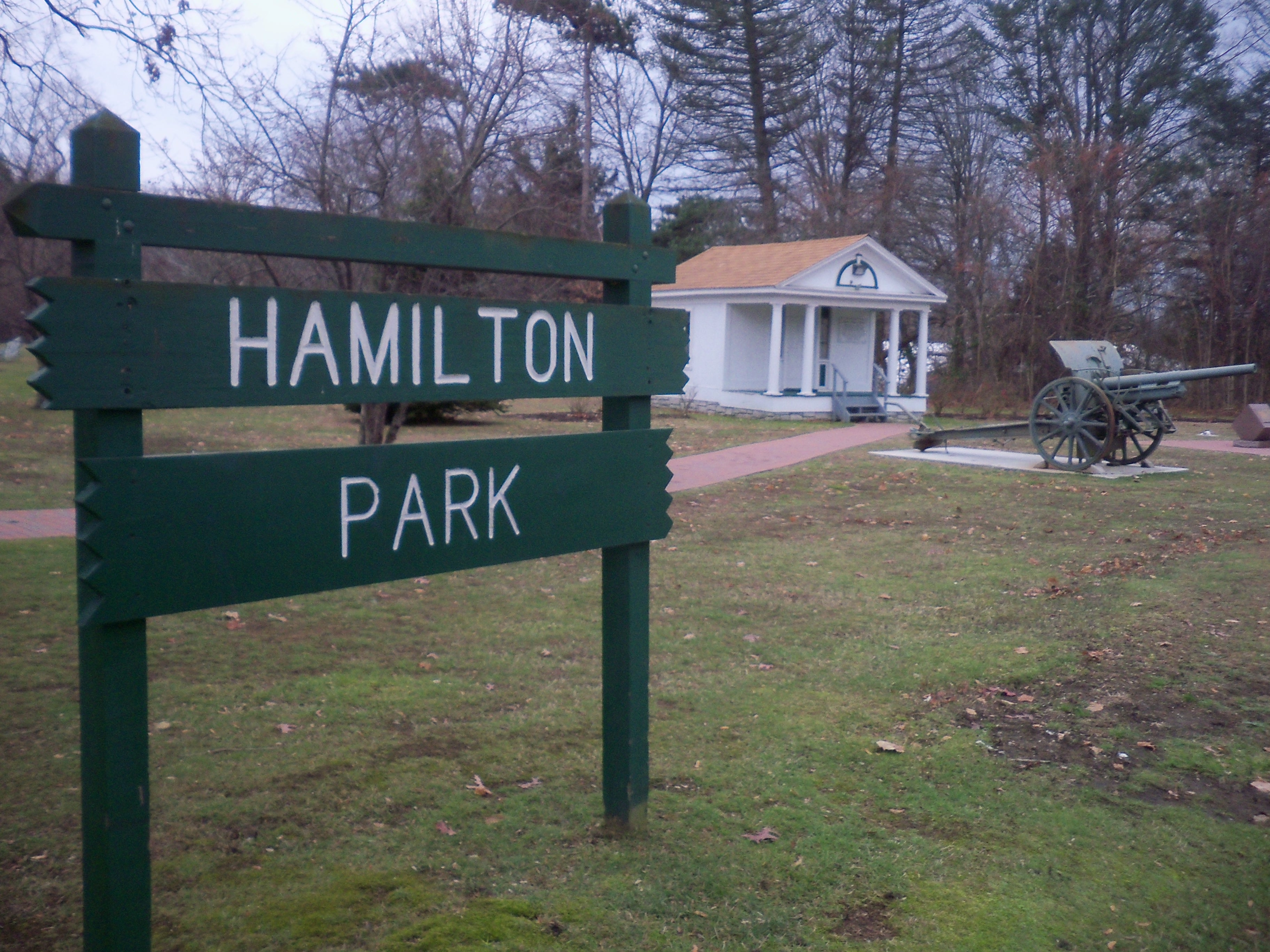
- Main entrance, with Liberty House

- Location within Connecticut Location within the United States
- Location: Roughly bounded by Silver Street, East Main Street, Idylwood Avenue, Plank Road, the Mad River and Interstate 84, Waterbury, Connecticut
- Coordinates: 41°32′26″N 73°1′4″W
- Area: 93.1 acres (37.7 ha)
- Built: 1898
- Architect: Dunkelburger, George L., et al
- Architectural style: Colonial Revival, Rustic
- NRHP reference No.: 96000846
- Added to NRHP: August 15, 1996

Hamilton Park is the oldest city park in Waterbury, Connecticut. Founded in 1898 as a gift from the locally prominent Hamilton family, it offers both passive and active recreation, with ballfields and other amenities. It is located on 93 acres (38 ha) Southeast of Downtown Waterbury, accessed via entrances on East Main Street. It was listed on the National Register of Historic Places in 1996.

== Description and history ==
Hamilton Park consists of 93 acres of rolling terrain, bounded on the north by East Main Street, the west by Silver Street Expressway and the Mad River the south by the river and Interstate 84, and the East by Idylwood Avenue, Plank Road, and a residential area. It is entered via a formal entrance at Hamilton Park Road and East Main Street, and a secondary entrance at Idylwood Avenue and East Main Street. The easternmost section of the park is a relatively unimproved wooded area which serves as a bird sanctuary. The western and southern sections are more intensively developed, with formal athletic fields and passive open fields to the south, and several structures in the northwestern parts. The structures include a building built as a dance pavilion but now housing the Seven Angels Theater, and the Liberty House, so named because it was where Liberty Bonds were sold during World War I. Near the center is a small pond, which once served as a swimming hole. At the southern and southeastern edge of the park, abutting Interstate 84, are foundational and archaeological remnants of the Waterbury Brass Mill, the site of one of the city's first brass works.

The park's origin was in the 1898 gift of 45 acres (18 ha) of land by Mrs. David Hamilton in memory of her late husband, owner of a silver factory in the city. The park's design and growth is largely the work of Robert Cairns, a city engineer, and George C. Walker, the city's first park superintendent. Early features of the park included a swimming pool and zoo. The park was expanded north of Plank Road in 1915 with a gift of land from Carolyn Pratt, also from a family that owned a local metal factory, and then in 1916 to the east of Idylwood Avenue with a land gift from Goss family; the latter gift stipulated its use as a bird sanctuary.

== See also ==
- National Register of Historic Places listings in New Haven County, Connecticut
