= Mattatuck Museum =

Coordinates: 41.5572°N 73.0431°W

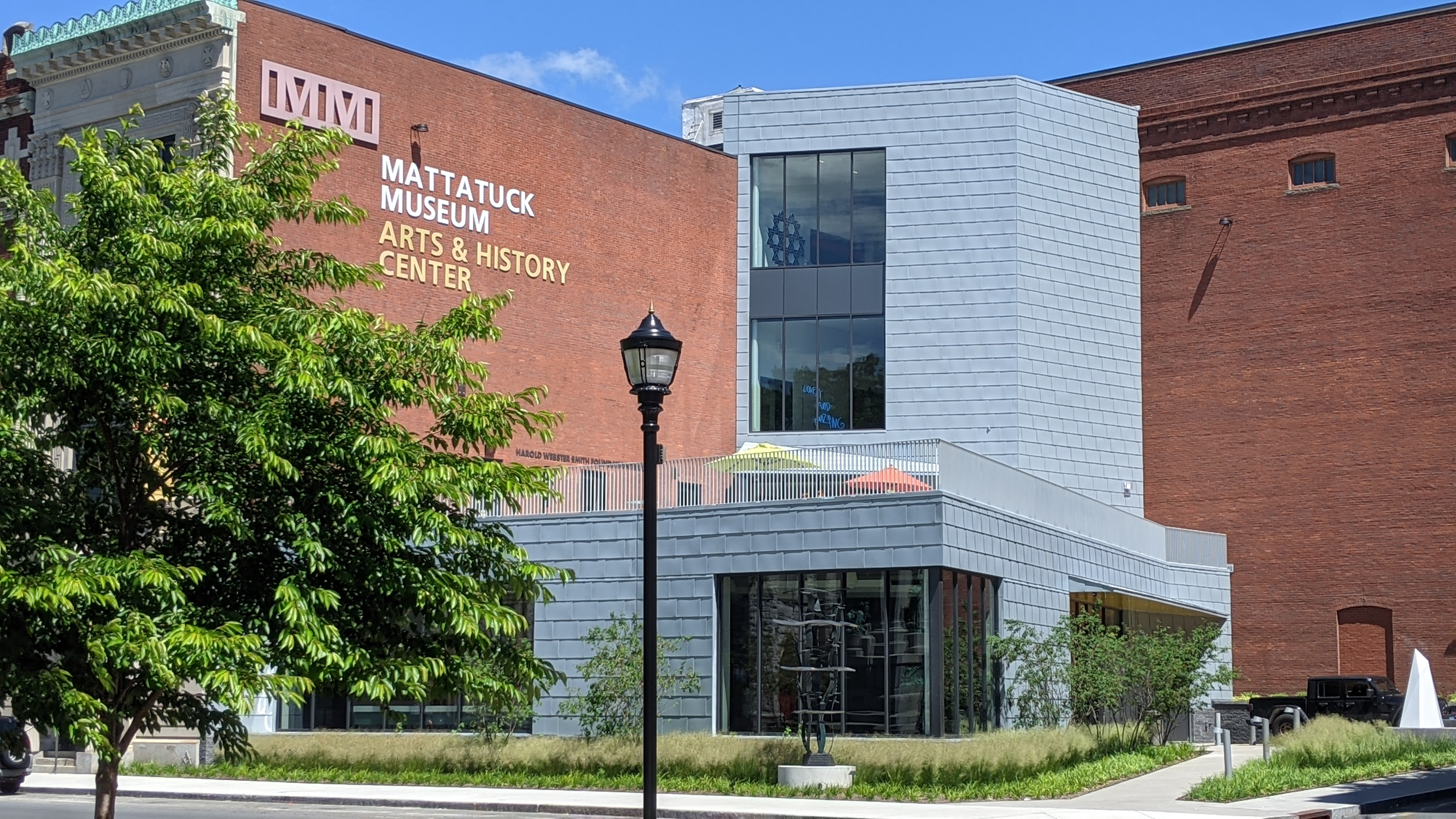
- Established: 1877 as The Mattatuck Historical Society
- Location: 144 West Main Street, Waterbury, CT 06702
- Type: Art museum, history museum
- Website: www.mattatuckmuseum.org

The Mattatuck Museum is a cultural institution based in Waterbury, Connecticut, USA. The museum's displays include the history, industries and culture of Waterbury and the Central Naugatuck Valley area, and art, including works about the state's history, people and scenery, and works of artists from Connecticut. The museum also features a collection of 15,000 buttons from around the world.

== Collection ==
The Mattatuck Museum focuses on the work of painters and sculptors who were born and/or based in Connecticut. Its collection spans the 18th, 19th and 20th centuries, and the artists represented in the museum's collection include Paolo Abbate, Abe Ajay, Alexander Calder, Frederic Church, Erastus Salisbury Field, Arshile Gorky, John Frederick Kensett, Peter Poskas, Kay Sage, Yves Tanguy and John Trumbull.

The museum also highlights the commercial and cultural achievements related to the city of Waterbury. This includes a collection of 15,000 buttons, which was donated to the museum by the now-defunct Button Museum operated by the Waterbury Button Company.

In 2008, the museum began offering self-guided tours of downtown Waterbury that highlight the city’s distinctive architectural achievements. The museum also features a regional history exhibit that uses interactive displays, oral histories and historic movie clips to trace the past and present of Waterbury and the surrounding areas in New Haven County, Connecticut.

The museum supports ongoing artistic achievement with its Connecticut Biennial, a competition that is open to artists who maintain a residence or a studio within the state. The biennial competition awards include products and gift certificates from local businesses.

== The remains of Fortune ==
In 1999, the museum received national attention for one item in its collection: a human skeleton. Later it was revealed that the skeleton was from an African enslaved man called Fortune who died in 1798. During the time of display, there was no information about the identity of the person; the skeleton was considered a teaching tool. It was believed to date from the late 18th century and was named Larry for name written on the skull. It was donated by the McGlannon family in the 1930s who had ancestral ties to the slave owner Dr. Preserved Porter. It was on display in a glass case until 1970, when it was removed from public viewing. An investigation in the late 1990s by the African-American History Project Committee identified the person. The museum created a special exhibit in honor of Fortune that detailed the lives of African-American slaves in Waterbury during the early part of the 19th century. Fortune was buried in Riverside Cemetery (Waterbury, Connecticut) on September 13, 2013.

== See also ==
- List of historical societies in Connecticut
