= Elton John (disambiguation) =

Elton John (born 1947) is an English singer, songwriter, pianist and composer.

Elton John may also refer to:

- Elton John (album), by Elton John, 1970
- Elton John (footballer) (born 1987), Trinidadian professional footballer

== See also ==
- John Elton (died 1751), British shipbuilder and seaman
- John Elton Coon (1907–1993), American politician in Louisiana
- John Prince Elton (1809–1864), American businessman
- Ernest John Elton; full name of Ernest Elton (1893–1958), British WWI flying ace
