= Calvin Holmes Carter =

American politician (1829–1887)

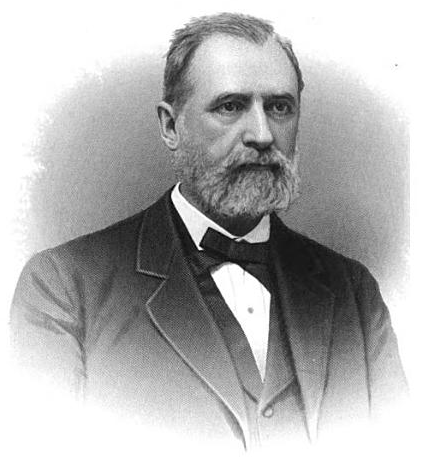
- Born: May 19, 1829; Waterbury, Connecticut, U.S.
- Died: September 18, 1887 (aged 58); Waterbury, Connecticut, U.S.
- Occupations: Lawyer, politician
- Relatives: Franklin Carter (brother)

Calvin Holmes Carter (May 19, 1829 – September 18, 1887) was an American politician. He served two terms in the Connecticut General Assembly in the 1880s, and was president of the Waterbury Brass Company.

== Early life and education ==
Carter, son of Preserve Wood Carter and Ruth (Holmes) Carter, was born in Waterbury, Connecticut, May 19, 1829. He entered Yale College in 1846, but left the class at the end of the Sophomore year, and joined the next class a year later. After graduation in 1851 he spent a year in the Yale Law School, and was then for some months in the office of the Hon. Increase Sumner, of Great Barrington, Massachusetts. He was admitted to the Massachusetts bar in 1853. His brother Franklin Carter became a professor of modern languages and president of Williams College.

== Career ==
Carter began practice in his native place in 1854. In 1861 he was appointed postmaster, and after this, although transacting some legal business, he was not actively engaged in his profession. In 1863 he resigned the postmastership, to become the manager of the Waterbury Brass Company, and was subsequently for several years president of that company. During his later years most of his time was given to the interests of the Detroit and Lake Superior Copper Company, of which he was the president. He was also much employed in the care of trust estates, for which his legal knowledge and his unswerving integrity especially qualified him. He took an active interest in public affairs, and served for two terms in the Connecticut State Legislature (1883 and 1885), besides filling various local offices of importance. He was one of the most active of the Board of Agents of the Bronson Library in Waterbury.

== Personal life ==
He married Mary Jane Darrow, who died several years before him. Of their seven children, three sons and a daughter survived him. He died, very suddenly, from apoplexy, at his home in Waterbury, September 18, 1887, in his 59th year. He was interred at Riverside Cemetery in Waterbury.
