= 6th Connecticut Infantry Regiment =

6th Connecticut Volunteer Infantry
- Active: September 12, 1861 - August 21, 1865
- Country: United States
- Allegiance: Union
- Branch: United States Army
- Type: Infantry
- Engagements: Battle of Fort Pulaski; Battle of Secessionville; Battle of Pocotaligo; Battle of Fort Wagner; Battle of Drewry's Bluff; Second Battle of Deep Bottom; Siege of Petersburg; Battle of Chaffin's Farm; Battle of Fair Oaks & Darbytown Road; Second Battle of Fort Fisher

Commanders
- Colonel: John Lyman Chatfield
- Colonel: Alfred P. Rockwell

The 6th Connecticut Infantry Regiment was an infantry regiment that served in the Union Army during the American Civil War.

== Service ==
The 6th Connecticut Infantry Regiment was organized at New Haven, Connecticut and mustered in for a three-year enlistment on September 12, 1861, under the command of Colonel John Lyman Chatfield.

The regiment was attached to Wright's 3rd Brigade, Sherman's Expeditionary Corps, to April 1862. 1st Brigade, 1st Division, Department of the South, to July 1862. District of Beaufort, South Carolina, Department of the South, to September 1862. District of Beaufort, South Carolina, X Corps, Department of the South, to March 1863. Jacksonville, Florida, to April 1863. District Hilton Head, South Carolina, X Corps, April 1863. Folly Island, South Carolina, X Corps to June 1863. 2nd Brigade, Folly Island, South Carolina, X Corps to July 1863. 2nd Brigade, 2nd Division, Morris Island, South Carolina, X Corps, July 1863. 1st Brigade, Morris Island, South Carolina, X Corps, July 1863. District of Hilton Head, South Carolina, X Corps to April 1864. 3rd Brigade, 1st Division, X Corps, Department of Virginia and North Carolina to May 1864. 2nd Brigade, 1st Division, X Corps, Department of Virginia and North Carolina, to December 1864. 2nd Brigade, 1st Division, XXIV Corps, to January 1865. 2nd Brigade, 1st Division, Terry's Provisional Corps, Department of North Carolina, to March 1865. 2nd Brigade, 1st Division, X Corps, Department of North Carolina, to April 1865. Abbott's Detached Brigade, Department of North Carolina, to July 1865.

The 6th Connecticut Infantry mustered out of service August 21, 1865.

== Detailed service ==
Left Connecticut for Washington, D.C., September 17, then moved to Annapolis, Maryland, October 5. Sherman's Expedition to Port Royal, South Carolina, October 21-November 7, 1861. Capture of Forts Walker and Beauregard, Port Royal Harbor, November 7. Reconnaissance on Hilton Head Island November 8. Expedition to Braddock's Point November 10–11. Duty at Hilton Head, South Carolina, until January 20. Expedition to Warsaw Sound January 20-February 27. Duty at Hilton Head Island until March 20. Moved to Dafuskie Island and siege operations against Fort Pulaski, Georgia, March 20-April 11. Bombardment and capture of Fort Pulaski April 10–11. Operations on James Island June 1–28. Grimball's Plantation June 10. Battle of Secessionville June 16. Evacuation of James Island and movement to Hilton Head Island June 28-July 7. Duty there until October. Expedition to Pocotaligo, South Carolina, October 21–23. Action at Frampton's Plantation, Pocotaligo, October 22. Duty at Beaufort, South Carolina, until March 1863, and at Jacksonville, Florida, until April. Moved to Hilton Head Island, South Carolina, and duty there until June. Occupation of Folly Island, South Carolina, June 3-July 10. Attack on Morris Island, South Carolina, July 10. Assault on Fort Wagner, Morris Island, July 18. Moved to Hilton Head Island, South Carolina, July 25, and duty there until April 1864. Moved to Gloucester Point April 27-May 1. Butler's operations on the south side of the James River and against Petersburg and Richmond May 4–28. Swift Creek or Arrowfield Church May 9–10. Chester Station May 10. Operations against Fort Darling May 12–16. Proctor's Creek May 13. Battle of Drewry's Bluff May 14–16. At Bermuda Hundred until August 13. Ware Bottom Church May 20. Petersburg June 9. Port Walthal June 16–17. Siege operations against Petersburg and Richmond June 16, 1864 to January 3, 1865. Ware Bottom Church June 20, 1864. Demonstration on the north side of the James River August 13–20. Battle of Strawberry Plains, Deep Bottom, August 14–18. Deep Run August 16. In the trenches before Petersburg August 25-September 27. Moved to north side of the James River September 27–28. Battle of Chaffin's Farm, New Market Heights, September 28–30. Darbytown and New Market Roads October 7. Darbytown Road October 13. Battle of Fair Oaks October 27–28. In front of Richmond October 31-November 2. Detached for duty at New York City during the Presidential election of 1864, November 2–17. Duty in the trenches before Richmond until January 3, 1865. Second expedition to Fort Fisher, North Carolina, January 3–15. Assault and capture of Fort Fisher January 15. Half Moon Battery January 19. Sugar Loaf Battery February 11. Fort Anderson February 18. Capture of Wilmington February 22. North East Ferry February 22. Duty at Wilmington, North Carolina, until June and at Goldsboro until July.

== Casualties ==
The regiment lost a total of 235 men during service; 8 officers and 99 enlisted men killed or mortally wounded, 4 officers and 124 enlisted men died of disease.

== Commanders ==
- Colonel John L. Chatfield - mortally wounded in action in the assault on Fort Wagner, July 18, 1863
- Colonel Alfred Perkins Rockwell

== See also ==
- Connecticut in the American Civil War
- List of Connecticut Civil War units
