= Augustus Sabin Chase =

American industrialist (1828–1896)

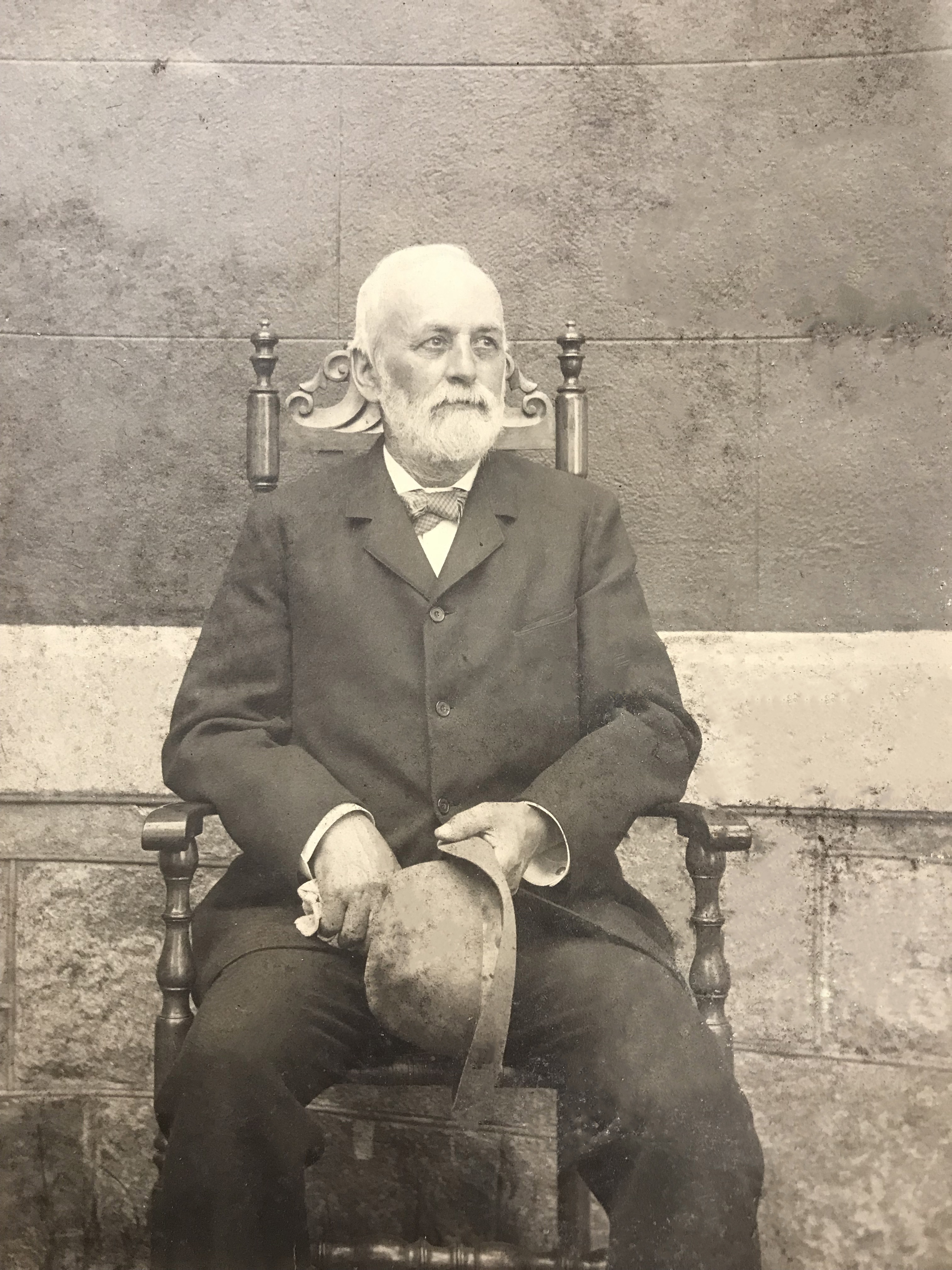
Augustus Sabin Chase

Augustus Sabin Chase (August 15, 1828—June 7, 1896) was an American industrialist of the Gilded Age.

== Biography ==
Augustus Sabin Chase was born in Pomfret, Connecticut, the only son of Capt. Seth Chase (1798-1893) and Eliza Hempstead (Dodge) Chase, who also had three daughters, Angeline, who died in infancy, Hannah Elizabeth ("Lizzie", who married Allen Aldrich and after his death married Seth Kimball) and Ellen Maria ("Maria", who never married). The family is descended on both sides from 17th-century English Colonial settlers. He spent his youth on his father's farm, now called "Jericho", located in the Jericho school district of Pomfret, in the northeast corner of Connecticut. He attended the one room Jericho school and at age sixteen he attended Woodstock Academy. At age eighteen, he briefly taught in a country school in Brooklyn, Connecticut. The following year clerked in the Danielson Manufacturing Company store in Killingly.

He settled in Waterbury, Connecticut, in 1850, to take a position in the Waterbury Savings Bank, where he rapidly became cashier (1852) and eventually president (1864), a position which he retained for his lifetime. He developed interests in many of Waterbury's companies and obtained controlling shares in Waterbury Watch Company, the Benedict & Burnham Manufacturing Company, and the Waterbury Buckle Company. He later became president of these companies. He also founded the Waterbury National Bank.

In 1876 he and a group of investors bought the assets of the bankrupt U.S. Button Company, forming the Waterbury Manufacturing Company, of which he was treasurer, then president. Waterbury Manufacturing became the core of the Chase Companies (1913) and later of Chase Brass and Copper Company (1936).

When the Waterbury American was about to fold in 1868, he was one of the organizers of the American Printing Company, to continue the newspaper's publication and was its president from 1877. A lifelong Republican, he represented Waterbury in the Connecticut State Legislature, 1865.

In the 1880s he purchased a house, "Rose Hill", on a hillside tract above Waterbury's main square. He was one of the founders of the Waterbury Club and its first president. He was a trustee of St. Margaret's School and its first treasurer.

He was one of the original members of the Second Congregational Society, also of the Waterbury Hospital corporation. he was the first treasurer of the city of Waterbury and served on the city's school and water boards and the Board of Agents of the Silas Bronson Library.

On September 7, 1854, A.S. Chase married in Waterbury Martha Clark Starkweather (1830-1906), daughter of Dr. Rodney Starkweather and Jane (Starkweather) Starkweather of Chesterfield, Massachusetts. They had six children, of whom the three Yale-educated sons succeeded him in his manufacturing and other concerns. The eldest, Henry Sabin Chase (1855-1918), graduated from Yale College in 1877 and managed the American Printing Company and was treasurer of the Waterbury Manufacturing Company and president of the combined Chase Companies. He married on April 4, 1889, Alice, daughter of Thomas Morton. Irving Hall Chase (1858-1951), (Yale 1880) was secretary of the Waterbury Clock Company. On February 28, 1889, he married Elizabeth Hosmer, daughter of the Hon. S.W. Kellogg. Frederick Starkweather Chase (1862-1947; Yale 1887) was president of the Waterbury Manufacturing Company. On February 17, 1890, he married Elsie, the daughter of the Rev. Dr. Edmund Rowland. Elsie became an exceptional fine artist, whose paintings illustrated their youngest daughter Justine's book 'A World Remembered' in 1988.

The three daughters were Helen Elizabeth, Mary Eliza (Kimball), and Alice Martha (Streeter).

A.S. Chase died in Paris in April 1896, of a chronic kidney infection, while on tour with his daughter Alice. He was interred at Riverside Cemetery, Waterbury.
