= John Lyman Chatfield =

Union Army officer

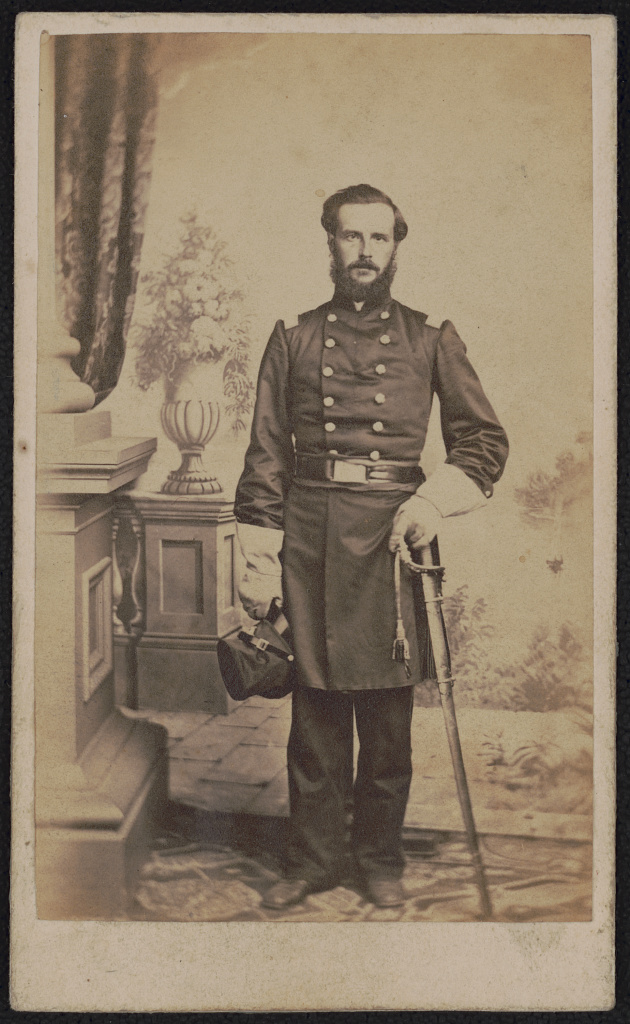
- Born: September 13, 1826; Oxford, Connecticut, US
- Died: August 9, 1863 (aged 36) Waterbury, Connecticut, US
- Allegiance: United States; Union
- Branch: United States Army: Union Army
- Rank: Colonel
- Commands: 1st Connecticut Infantry Regiment 3rd Connecticut Infantry Regiment 6th Connecticut Infantry Regiment
- Conflicts: American Civil War: First Battle of Bull Run; Battle of Port Royal; Siege of Fort Pulaski; Battle of Secessionville; Second Battle of Pocotaligo; Second Battle of Fort Wagner †

John Lyman Chatfield (1826–1863) was a Union Army colonel in the American Civil War. He was mortally wounded while assaulting Fort Wagner, South Carolina on July 18, 1863, and died on August 9, 1863.

== Early life ==
Chatfield was born September 13, 1826, at Oxford, Connecticut. He moved to Waterbury, Connecticut with his brothers in 1851. He joined the City Guard in 1854 and was made first lieutenant.

== American Civil War ==
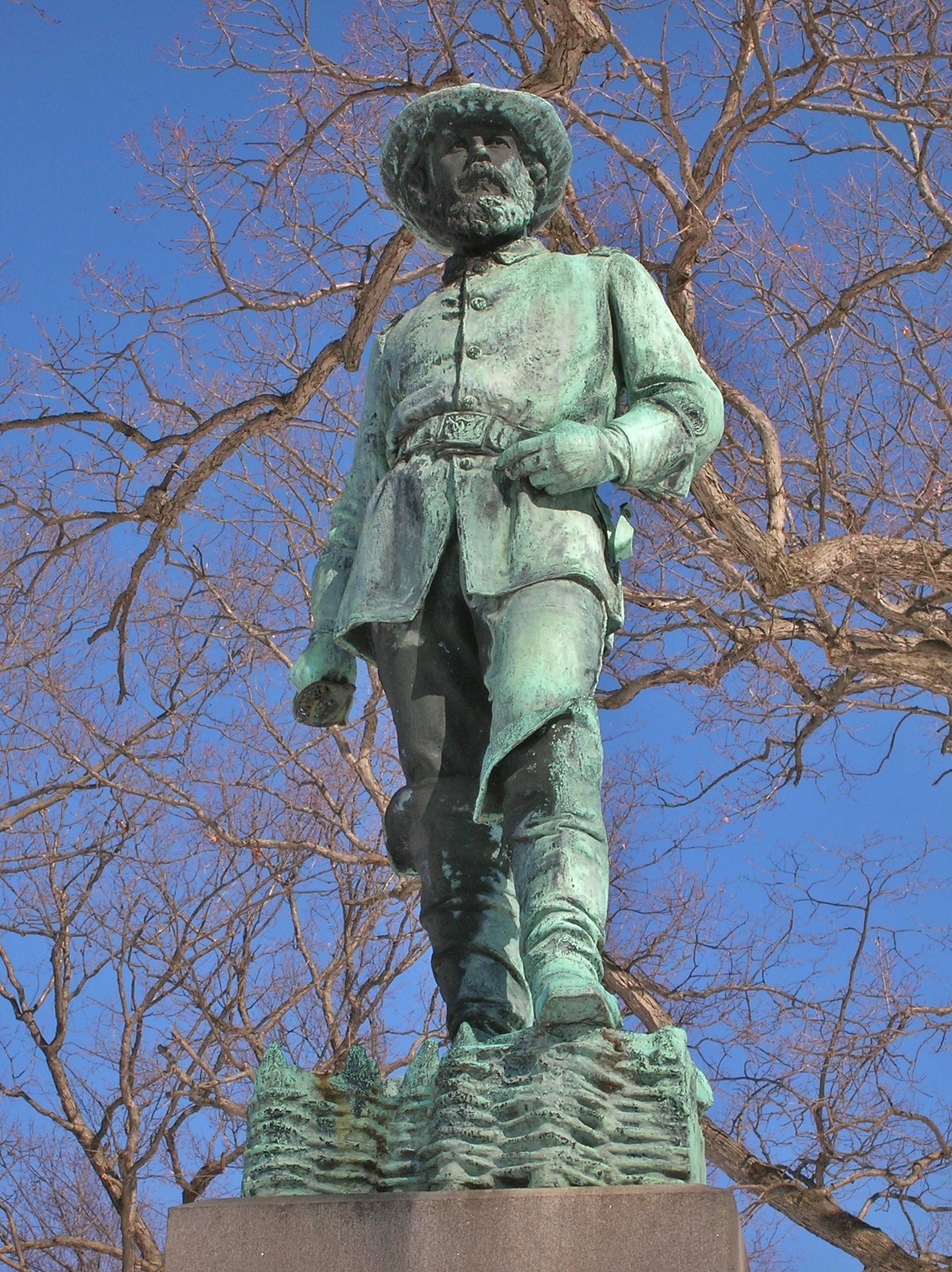
John Lyman Chatfield monument (sculpted by George Edwin Bissell, unveiled 1887), Riverside Cemetery, Waterbury, CT

When President Lincoln issued his call for 75,000 men, Chatfield and his company signed up and left for New Haven on April 20, 1861. His company was the first accepted by the Governor.

Chatfield was appointed major of the 1st Regiment Connecticut Volunteer Infantry (3 months) on April 23, 1861, and lieutenant colonel of that regiment on May 10, 1861. Chatfield was promoted to colonel of the 3rd Regiment Connecticut Volunteer Infantry (3 months) on May 31, 1861. He was mustered out of the volunteers on August 12, 1861.

On September 13, 1861, Chatfield was appointed colonel of the 6th Regiment Connecticut Volunteer Infantry. Chatfield commanded the 1st Brigade, 1st Division, Union Department of the South between April 1862 and July 1862. He commanded the District of Beaufort, South Carolina under the X Corps commander, Major General Ormsby M. Mitchel, in October 1862.

On October 21, 1862, Major General Mitchel gave command of an expedition for the purpose of destroying track and bridges of the Charleston and Savannah Railroad in Jasper County, South Carolina to Brigadier General John M. Brannan, commander of the First Brigade of the Union force. Mitchel already had contracted yellow fever, from which he was to die on October 30, 1862. Brannan gave command of the First Brigade, which was heavily engaged in the Battle of Pocotaligo on October 22, 1862, to Colonel Chatfield. Chatfield suffered a wound in his right thigh from an artillery shell at Pocotaligo.

On July 18, 1863, Brigadier General George Crockett Strong ordered an attack by Chatfield in cooperation with Haldimand S. Putnam, Quincy Adams Gillmore, Robert Gould Shaw, and Truman Seymour on Confederate Fort Wagner on Morris Island, South Carolina south of the harbor at Charleston, South Carolina. While leading his men in an attack on the Fort's front, Chatfield was mortally wounded. He was pulled out of action and returned to Connecticut.

== Death and legacy ==
Chatfield died from gangrene which developed in his wounds on August 9, 1863, at Waterbury, Connecticut. He was interred at Riverside Cemetery. The funeral was attended by General Robert Anderson, the defender of Fort Sumter and William Alfred Buckingham, Governor of Connecticut.

On September 13, 1887, a bronze statue was unveiled at Riverside Cemetery in his memory. The life-size statue of Chatfield was designed by George Edwin Bissell and was placed atop a seven-foot granite pedestal. The unveiling ceremony included members of the Sixth regiment and the First Light battery. A speech from General Stephen Wright Kellogg during the ceremony referenced Chatfield's courage and patriotism.
