= Franklin Carter =

American academic administrator

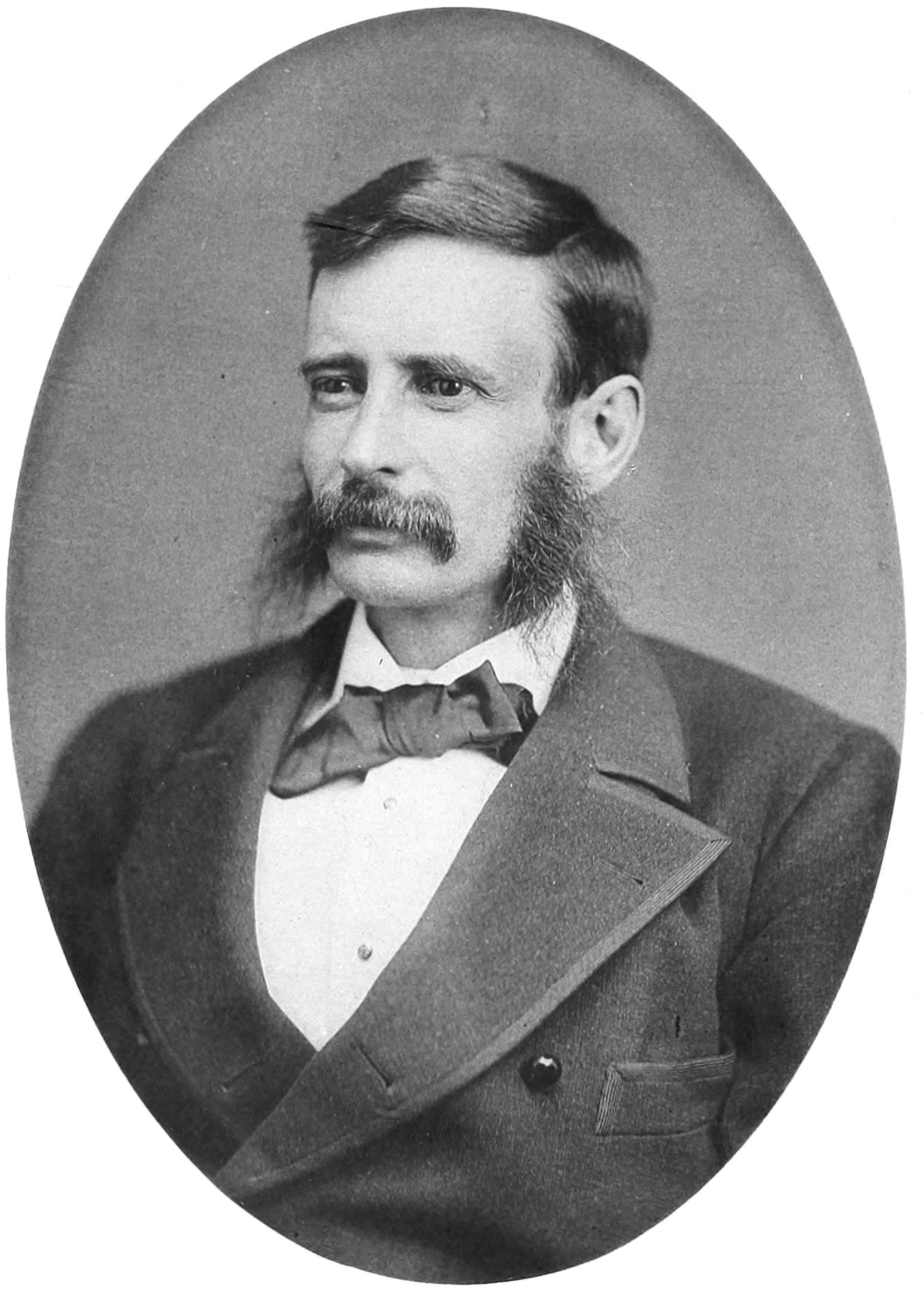

President of Williams College
- In office 1881–1901

Personal details
- Born: September 30, 1837 Waterbury, Connecticut, U.S.
- Died: November 22, 1919 (aged 82) Williamstown, Massachusetts, U.S.
- Spouse: Sarah L. Kingsbury
- Relations: Calvin Holmes Carter (brother)
- Education: Yale College; Williams College (B.A., Ph.D.)

Franklin Carter (September 30, 1837 – November 22, 1919) was an American professor of Germanic and romance languages and served as President of Williams College from 1881 to 1901.

Carter was born September 30, 1837, in Waterbury, Connecticut, the third son of Deacon Preserve Wood Carter and Ruth Holmes Carter. He attended Phillips Academy Andover, then matriculated at Yale College in 1855. He became sick and retreated to Florida, until 1860, when he entered Williams College. Graduating in 1862, he received a professorship in French and German the following year.

He married Sarah Leavenworth Kingsbury on February 24, 1863, departing for Europe before assuming his appointment at Williams. He took up teaching in 1865, becoming head of the Latin department in 1868 before becoming Professor of German at Yale College in 1873.

Franklin was the head of a language scholar organisation called the Modern Languages Association. He later became president of the Williams College in 1881, the first president of the university to also be a scholar. As president, Carter doubled the size of the faculty and completed eight buildings. He brought his friend John Haskell Hewitt to Williams, who became acting president upon Carter's retirement in 1901.

He died on November 22, 1919, in Williamstown, Massachusetts and was interred at Riverside Cemetery in Waterbury, Connecticut.

Academic offices
Preceded by Paul Chadbourne	President of Williams College; 1881–1901	Succeeded by John Haskell Hewitt
