= John Haskell Hewitt =

American classical scholar

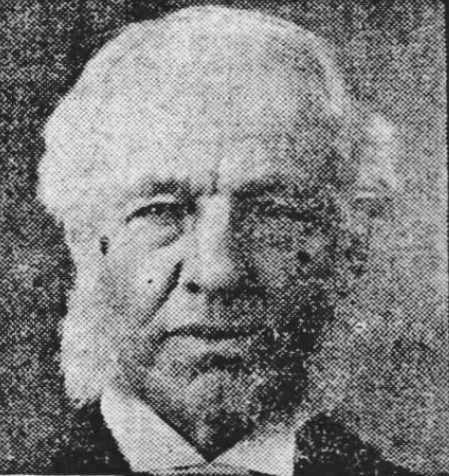
- Born: August 8, 1835; Preston, Connecticut, U.S.
- Died: October 8, 1920 (aged 85); Williamstown, Massachusetts, U.S.
- Education: Yale University
- Occupation: Academic
- Employer: Williams College
- Spouse: Mary Louisa Downing (m. 1869)
- Children: 2

John Haskell Hewitt (August 8, 1835 – October 8, 1920) was an American classical scholar and educator, notable for serving as acting president of Williams College from 1901 to 1902.

Born in Preston, Connecticut, to Charles Hewitt and Eunice (Witter), Hewitt entered Yale University in 1855, initially intending to study law. While at Yale he befriended Franklin Carter, a relationship that would prove beneficial in later years. After graduating with an A.B. in 1859, Hewitt then earned an advanced degree from the Yale Divinity School in 1863. He served as a librarian at Yale's Brothers in Unity Library until 1865, until he accepted a position teaching Latin and Greek at Olivet College. He became a full professor the same year, and earned a master's degree from Yale in 1867.

On September 8, 1869, Hewitt married Mary Louisa Downing. They had two sons, both of which would become professors themselves, and a daughter. In 1875 Hewitt moved to Lake Forest College in Illinois, due to health problems, and served as trustee and acting president there. He studied and traveled in Europe from 1881 to 1882.

In 1882, Franklin Carter, now president of Williams College in Massachusetts, contacted Hewitt and offered him a prestigious professorship in ancient languages. Hewitt accepted, serving Williams in various capacities for the rest of his life. He earned another master's degree from Williams in 1888, and an LL.D. from Union College in 1895. When Carter resigned in 1901, Hewitt was named acting president until 1902, when he was replaced by Henry Hopkins. Williams went on to publish Williams College and Foreign Missions in 1914. He subsequently received a higher professorship of Greek in 1903, and became Professor Emeritus in 1909.
