= Waterbury Brass Company =

- Waterbury Brass Mill
- U.S. National Register of Historic Places
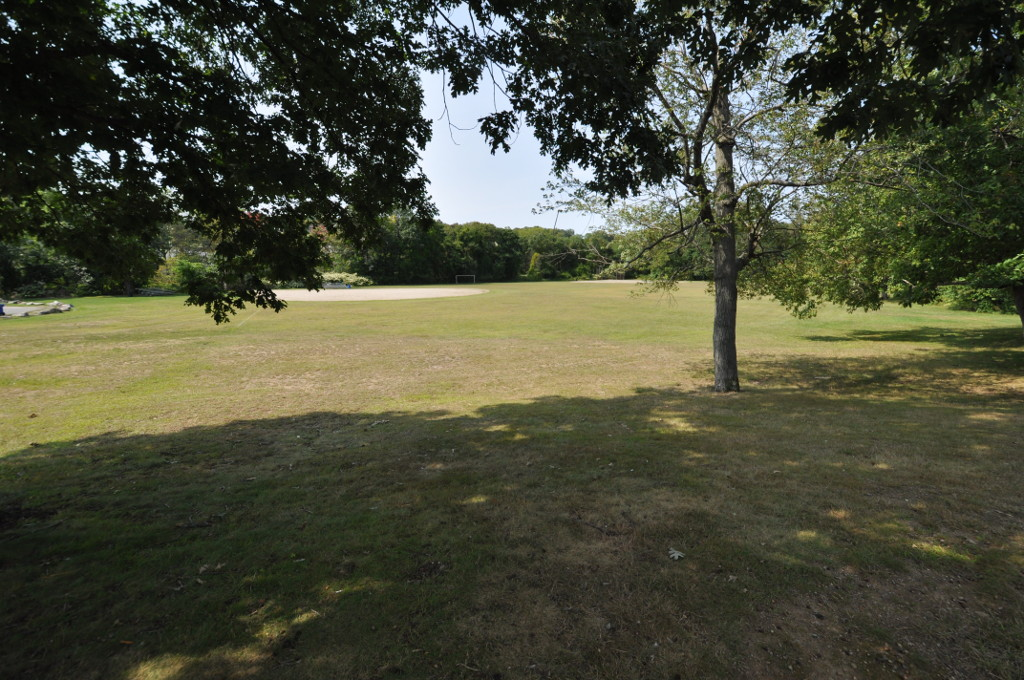
- Site of the Waterbury Brass Mill factory in Hamilton Park

- Location within Connecticut Location within the United States
- Location: Idlewood Avenue in Hamilton Park, Waterbury, Connecticut
- Coordinates: 41°32′26″N 73°01′04″W
- Area: 1 acre (0.40 ha)
- Built: 1846
- Built by: Waterbury Brass Company
- NRHP reference No.: 75001943
- Added to NRHP: September 5, 1975

The Waterbury Brass Company was an industrial company located in Waterbury, Connecticut. Founded in 1846 by Israel Holmes, it was at its founding the largest maker of rolled brass in the country. The company was folded into the American Brass Company in 1899. Archaeological remains of its manufacturing facility, located in Waterbury's Hamilton Park, were investigated in 1975 and were listed on the National Register of Historic Places.

== History ==
The Waterbury Brass Company was founded in 1846, by a group of businessmen led by Israel Holmes, a Waterbury industrialist who had previously engaged in other brass works. The company acquired a water privilege on the Mad River, and built its mill on the river's north bank. By the late 1850s the company was rolling more brass than any other brass company in the region, whose output dominated brass production in the nation. In 1852, the company acquired rights to the processes for manufacturing brass kettles, and soon became the major manufacturer of that item.

The company was merged into the American Brass Company in 1899; this company was formed by the merger of most of the major brassmakers in the Naugatuck River valley. Its plant continued to be used until 1905, when the major buildings were dismantled.

The archaeological remains of its plant are located in the southeast part of Hamilton Park. Although one much-altered building remained of the complex when the site was listed on the National Register in 1975, now only wall fragments and turbine pits survive as detectable remnants of the site.
