= Fortune (American slave) =

Slave in Waterbury, Connecticut (c. 1740s – 1798)

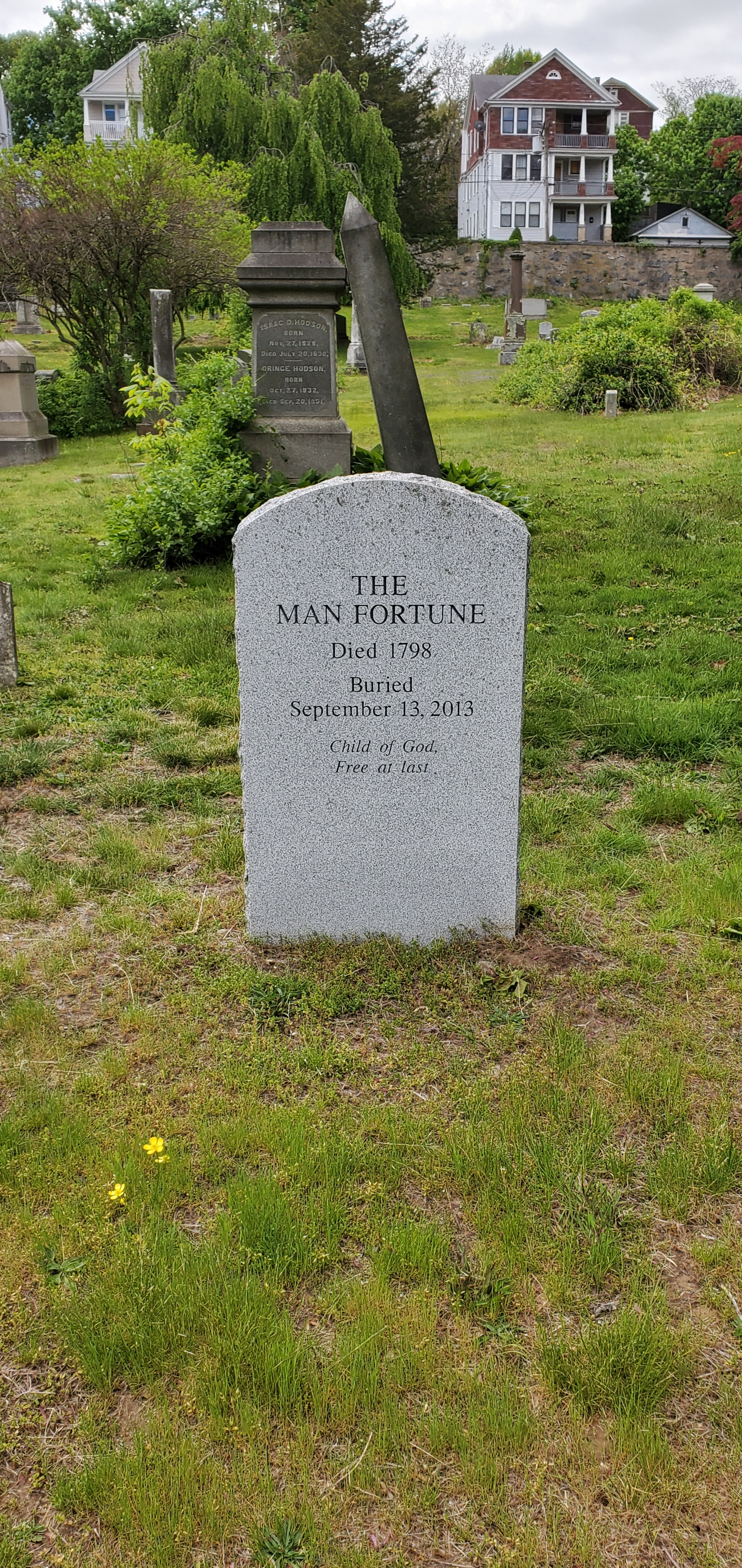
Headstone for The Man Fortune in Riverside Cemetery, Waterbury, Connecticut

Fortune (c. 1743 – 1798) was an enslaved African-American who achieved posthumous notability over the transfer of his remains from a museum storage room to a state funeral.

== Life ==
Under the laws of the 18th-century American colonial period, Fortune, his wife Dinah, and their four children, Africa, Jacob, Mira, and Roxa, were slaves of Preserved Porter, a physician in Waterbury, Connecticut. Fortune owned the house he and his family lived in, just outside the town center on the Porter property.

== Fortune's remains ==
Fortune died in 1798; a snapped vertebra suggested death by a fall, though earlier historians had reported that he drowned in the Naugatuck River. After his death, Porter dissected Fortune's body and preserved his skeleton for anatomic study. The doctor then opened a "School for Anatomy," which used Fortune's bones as the source of study. The anatomically inscribed skeleton was found in 1910 in a boarded-up closet of the Porter house.

The Porter family held Fortune's remains before donating them in 1933 to the Mattatuck Museum in Waterbury, where they were displayed through the 1970s; after that, they were put in storage.

In 1999, the museum received national attention when media coverage highlighted the discovery of Fortune's remains. Although the skeleton was initially dubbed "Larry," as that name was written on its skull, a later investigation by the Fortune Project, part of the African-American Historic Project Committee, determined the skeleton belonged to Fortune.

== Exhibit ==
The museum then created a special exhibit in honor of Fortune that detailed the lives of enslaved African-Americans in the early part of the 19th century, Fortune's Story: Larry's Legacy. Additionally, a poem by Marilyn Nelson, The Manumission Requiem, is displayed to honor Fortune. Fortune's bones were not shown in the exhibit out of respect for his life, but they were studied by scientists in an attempt to understand his life.

== State burial ==
On September 12, 2013, Fortune's remains were transferred to the Connecticut State Capitol, where they lay in state before being escorted by state police to St. John's Episcopal Church on the Green, the Waterbury parish where Fortune was baptized in 1797, and a funeral at the city's Riverside Cemetery.

== Fortune Mural Project ==
On November 2, 2024, a dedication ceremony was held at the North End Recreation Center in Waterbury, Connecticut to unveil a new mural in honor of Fortune. The mural is within walking distance of where Fortune lived, as well as within walking distance of the museum where his bones were on display. The mural depicts a reimagined image of Fortune and his family. It also depicts the legacy of Fortune's memory by celebrating influential individuals in the 50 year history of the North End Recreation Center. The ceremony can be viewed on YouTube here.

The Fortune Mural Project was an effort initiated in August 2023 by the Alex Breanne Corporation, a Connecticut-based non-profit focused on researching the formerly enslaved, then injecting them into the communities where they lived, worked or died. The work was managed by RiseUp for Arts, a Connecticut-based public arts non-profit. The artist who created the mural is Katiana Jarbath-Smith. A collective of state and local entities participated in a steering committee to drive this effort to completion. The committee included:

- John Mills – President and Founder, Alex Breanne Corporation
- Matt Conway – Executive Director, RiseUp for Arts
- Katiana Jarbath Smith – Artist and Founder, Jarbath Art
- Todd Levine, Architectural Historian, Connecticut State Historic Preservation Office
- Raechel Guest – Director, Silas Bronson Library
- Neva Vigezzi – Vestry, St. John's Episcopal Church
- Martin Begnal – President, Friends of Riverside Cemetery
- Holly Maxson – Fine Arts Supervisor, Waterbury Public Schools
- Wendy Tyson-Wood – President, Greater Waterbury NAACP
- Tammy Denease – Outreach Director, Connecticut Freedom Trail
- Maybeth Morales-Davis – Board Member, Waterbury Arts & Tourism Commission
- Sheree Marcucci – Director, Palace Theater
- Judith Mancini – Mayoral Advisor, Waterbury Mayor's Office
- Bob Burns – Director, Mattatuck Museum

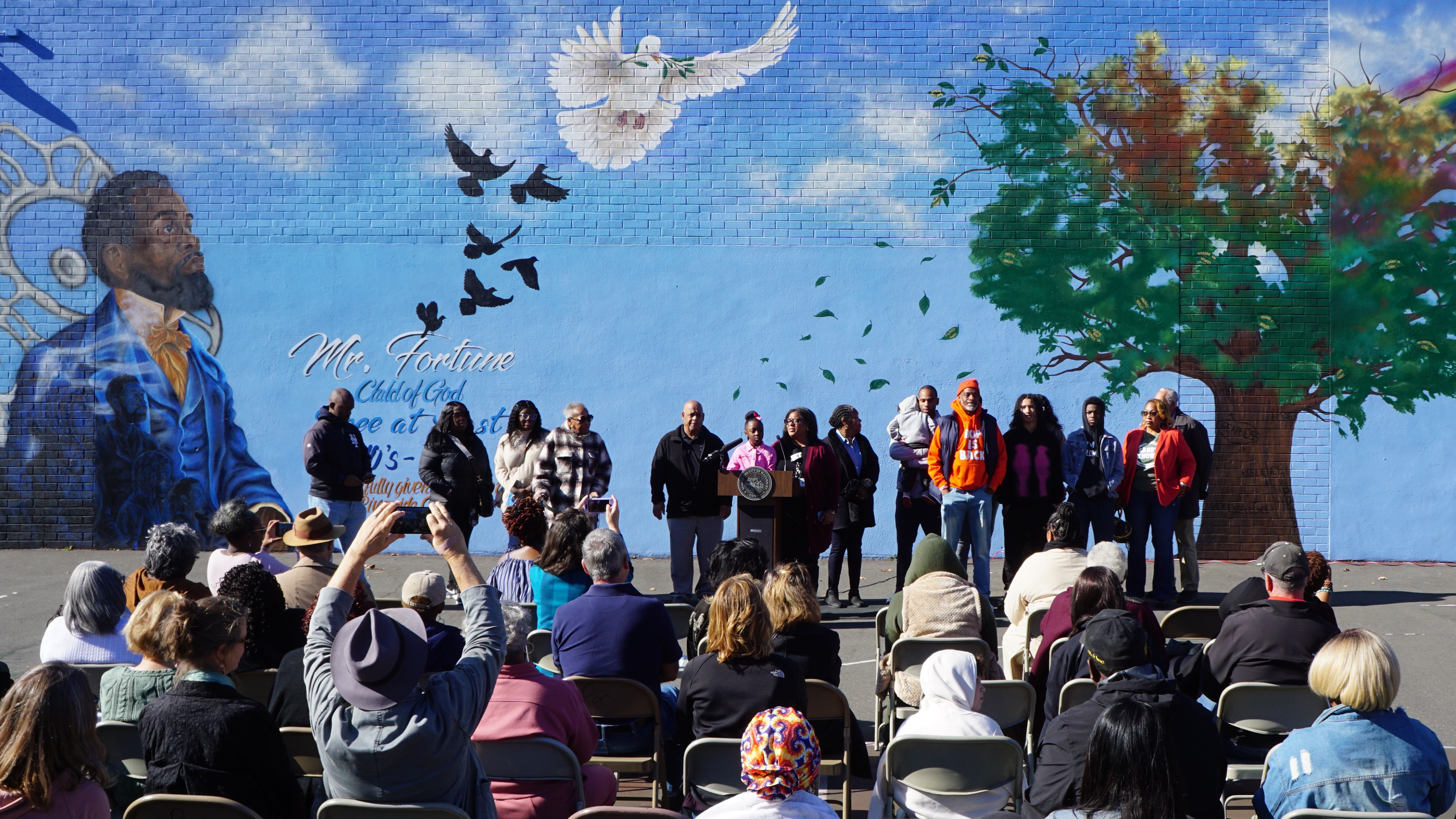
North End Recreation Center Director, Marguerite Bowen, speaks during the Fortune Mural Dedication Ceremony on November 2nd, 2024.

The Fortune Mural is intended to challenge our common definition of exceptionalism. It turns the lens towards those who may not be in our history books, yet built this country. It celebrates those who were kind-hearted, God fearing, and raised families, all while enduring racism, bias and mistreatment; doing so long enough for us all to exist today. To honor that definition of exceptionalism, the Fortune Mural also lists the names of individuals who have carried on the legacy of Fortune, embodying the same characteristics. Their names can be seen depicted on a Tree of Life in the center of the mural... individuals who have had a positive impact on the North End Recreation Center and the community at large.

2024 marked the 50th anniversary of the North End Recreation Center.
