= John Prince Elton =

American businessman (1809–1864)

John Prince Elton (April 15, 1809 – November 10, 1864) was an American businessman.

== Biography ==
He was born in Watertown, Connecticut, in 1809 to Dr. Samuel and Betsey Elton. He moved to Waterbury, Connecticut, in 1832 and was instrumental in its growth as a manufacturing city. His grandson, also named John Prince Elton, attended Trinity College in Hartford, Connecticut, where Elton Hall is named after him.

He was interred at Riverside Cemetery in Waterbury, Connecticut.
