= Riverside Cemetery (Waterbury, Connecticut) =

Historic rural cemetery

- U.S. National Register of Historic Places
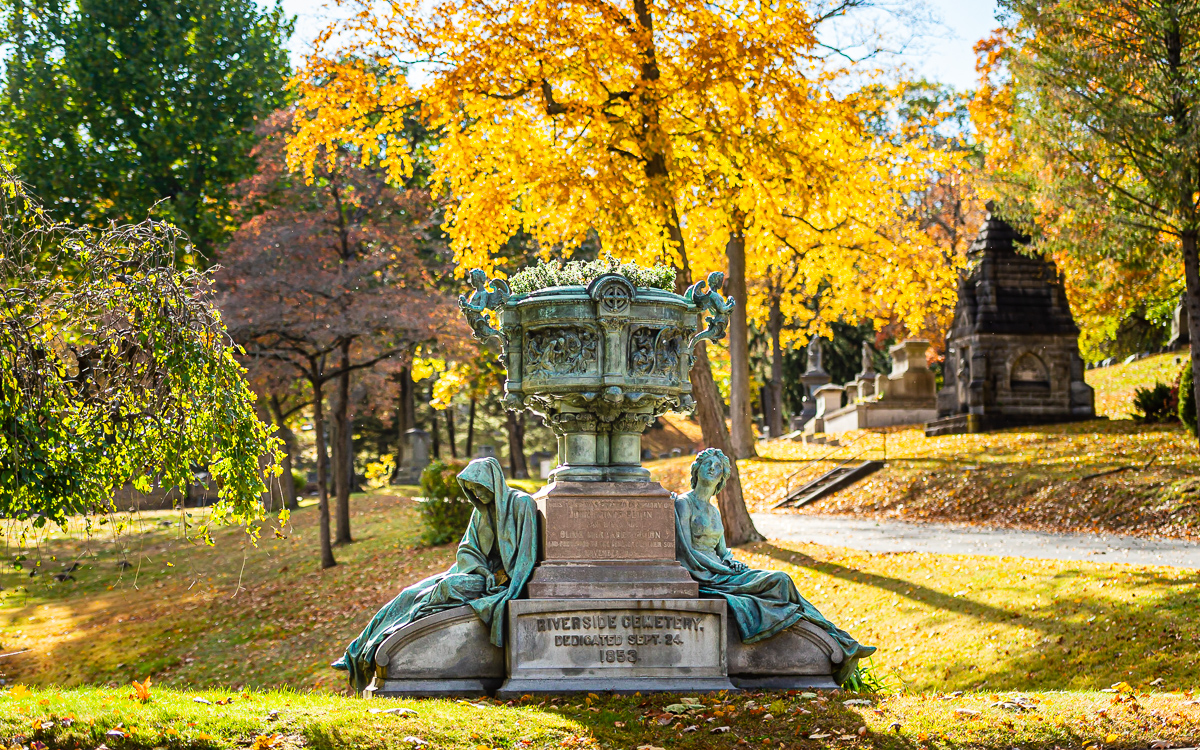
- The Elton Memorial Vase at the entrance to Riverside Cemetery

- Location within Connecticut Location within the United States
- Location: 496 Riverside Street, Waterbury, Connecticut 06708
- Coordinates: 41.548055°N 73.049043°W
- Built: 1853
- Architectural style: Gothic
- NRHP reference No.: 88001525
- Added to NRHP: September 20, 1988

Riverside Cemetery is a historic rural cemetery located at 496 Riverside Street in Waterbury, Connecticut, on the western bank of the Naugatuck River.

Dedicated on September 24, 1853, it is 36.4-acre (14.7 ha) in size and includes winding tree-lined paths, upper and lower ponds and an array of funerary monuments in the gothic, neo-classical, and romantic style. The property also includes many older burials and headstones dating back to the late 1700s which were relocated from the defunct Grand Street burial ground.

The cemetery was added to the National Register of Historic Places in 1988.

== History ==
From the late 1700s to the mid 1800s, burials in Waterbury took place at the old burial grounds now known as Library Park on Grand Street. The first suggestion for a new cemetery in Waterbury was made in 1849 by Dr. Amos S. Blake. An association was formed on March 6, 1850 and money was raised through the sale of burial lots.

The bronze statue, Wisdom, on the Benedict family monument was designed by Truman Howe Bartlett in 1871 and sculpted by Ferdinand von Miller in 1872.

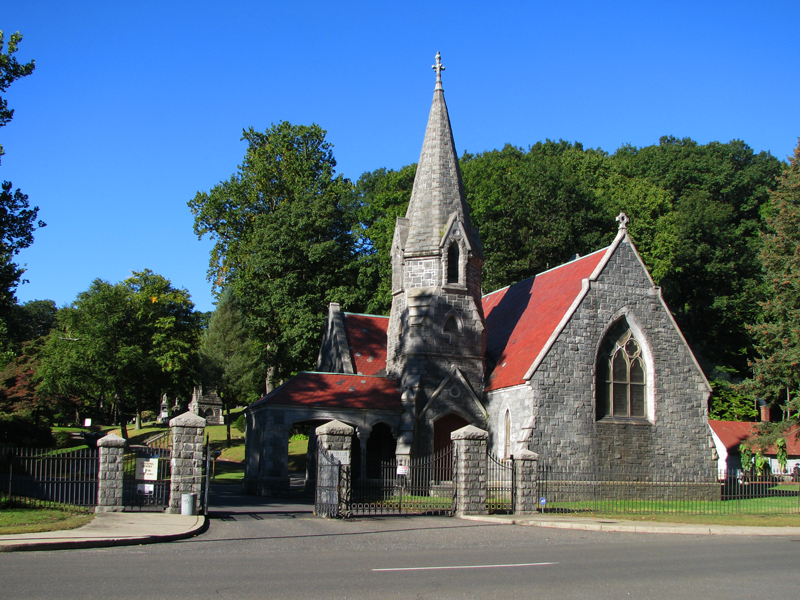
Hall Memorial Chapel designed by Robert W. Hill

The modern Gothic Hall Memorial Chapel was designed by noted Waterbury architect Robert W. Hill and completed in 1885.

The monument to Civil War Colonel John Lyman Chatfield was designed by George Edwin Bissell and was unveiled at a ceremony on September 13, 1887.

The Elton Memorial Vase sits at the entrance of the cemetery. It was designed by George Edwin Bissell and cast by Fonderia Galli in 1905. The bronze monument depicts four scenes from the Life of Christ. The first side depicts the adoration of the Wise Men; the second side, the Crucifixion; the third side, the entombment; and the fourth side, the Resurrection. Decorative figures carrying wreaths form the handles with the vase supported by cherubs. The large bronze figures on the side of the vase depict Grief and Faith.

== Notable Burials ==
- Ruth Muskrat Bronson (1897–1982), Cherokee poet, educator and Native-American rights activist
- Calvin Holmes Carter (1829–1887), politician
- Franklin Carter (1837–1919), president of Williams College
- John Lyman Chatfield (1826–1863), U.S. Civil War Union Army Colonel
- Augustus Sabin Chase (1828–1896), industrialist
- John Prince Elton (1809–1864), industrialist
- Fortune, (1743–1798), African-American slave
- Edward Wheeler Goss (1893–1972), U.S. Congressman
- Wilfred E. Griggs (1866–1918), architect
- Robert W. Hill (1828–1909), architect
- David Hoadley (1774–1839), architect
- Stephen Wright Kellogg (1822–1904), U.S. Congressman
- Green Kendrick (1798–1873), 43rd Lieutenant Governor of Connecticut
- George L. Lilley (1859–1909), U.S. Congressman, 63rd Governor of Connecticut
- William Hampton Patton (1853–1918), entomologist
- Charles A. Templeton (1871–1955), 68th Governor of Connecticut
- Allen B. Wilson (1823–1888), inventor and sewing machine manufacturer

== Gallery ==
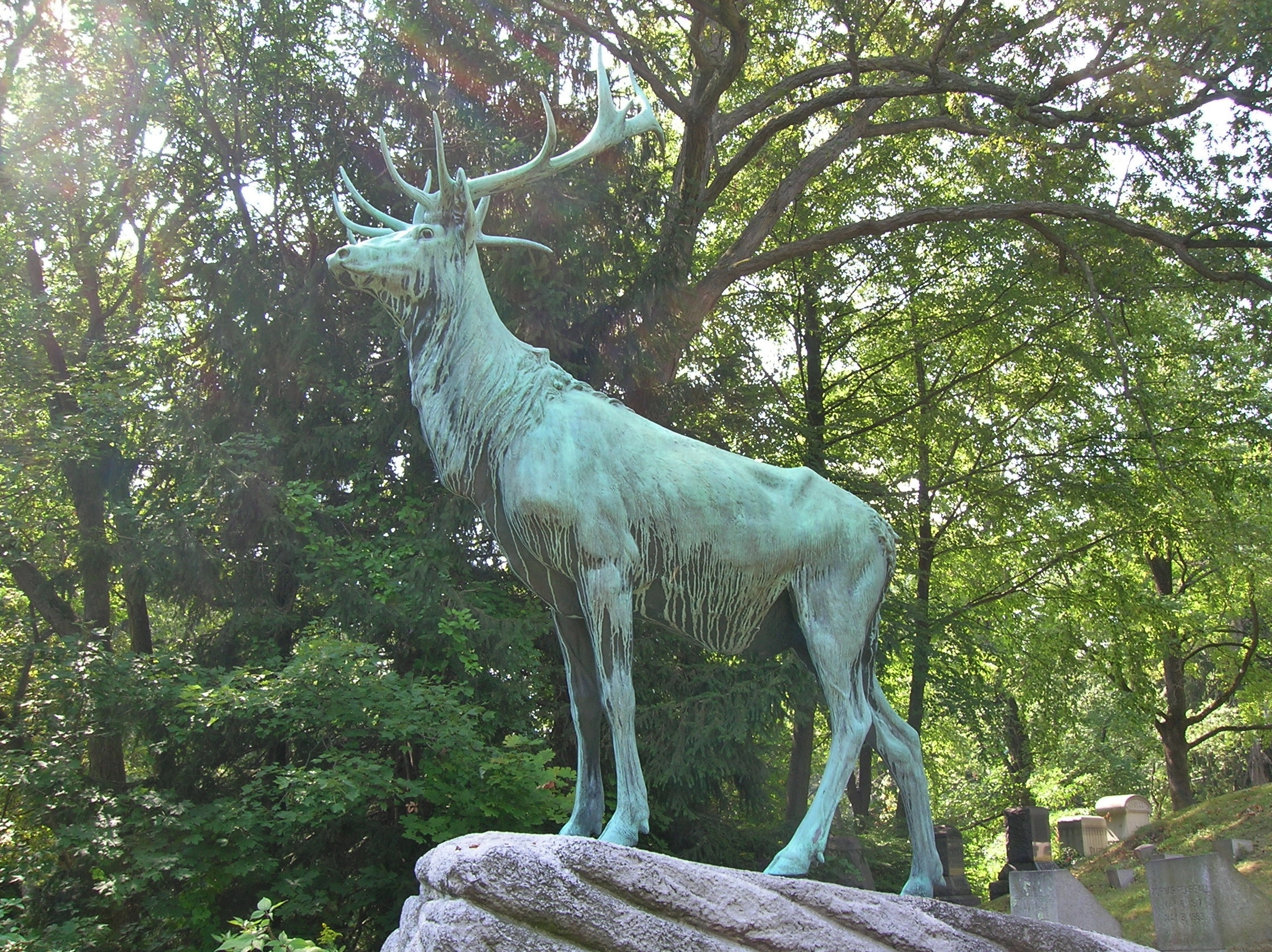
The bronze elk statue by Eli Harvey on the grave of Edward Leach

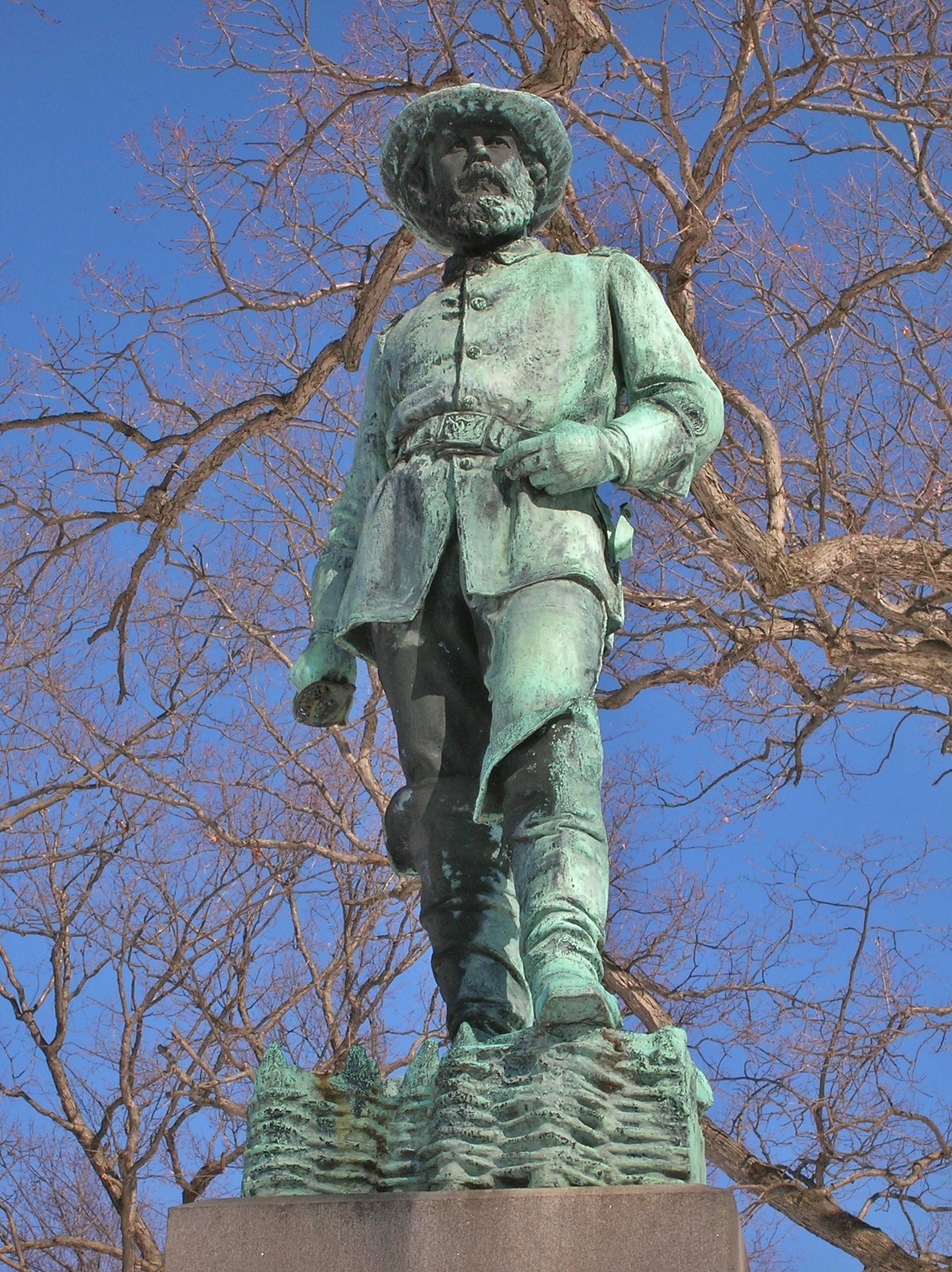
The John Lyman Chatfield Monument by George Edwin Bissell was unveiled in 1887

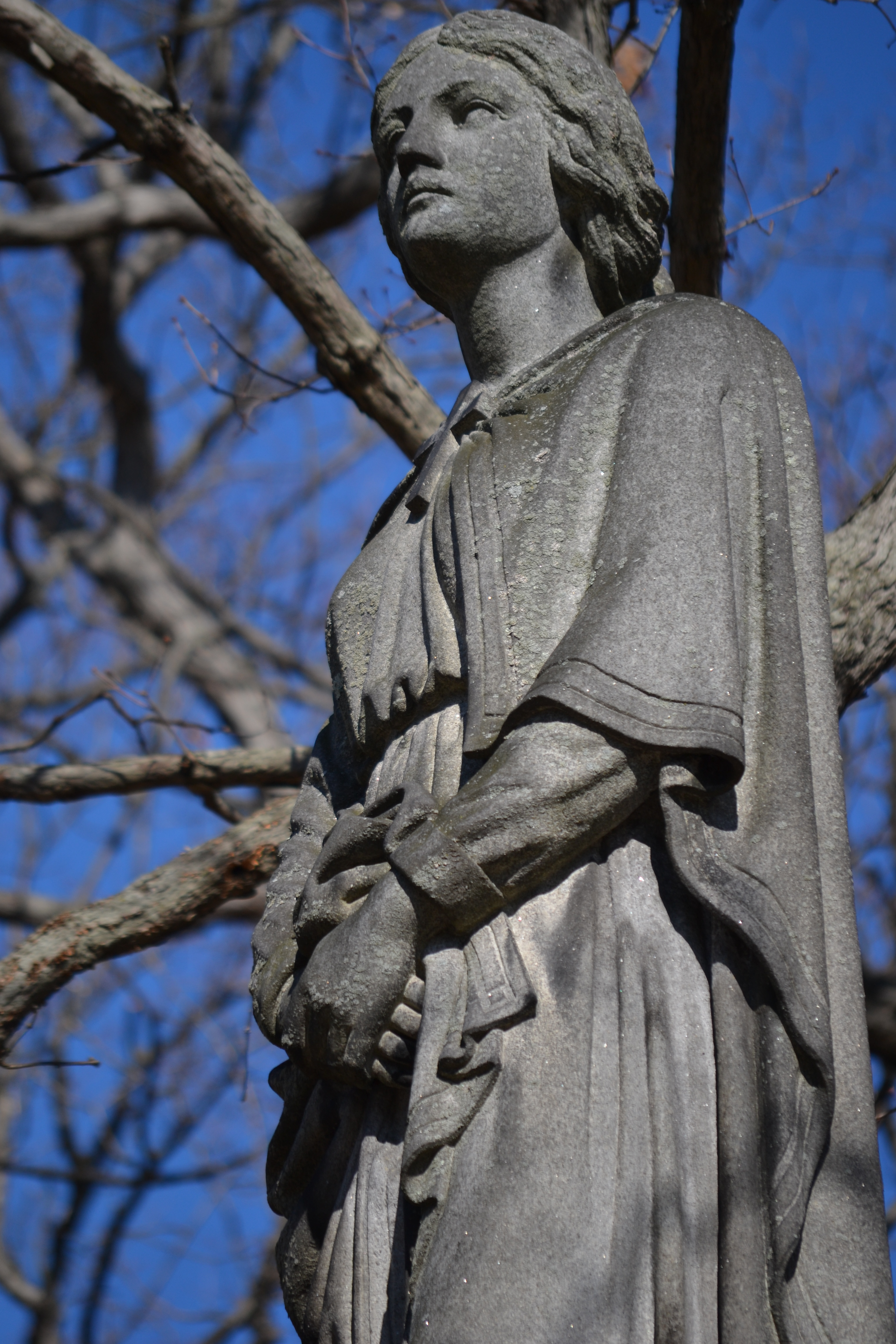
The Booth monument

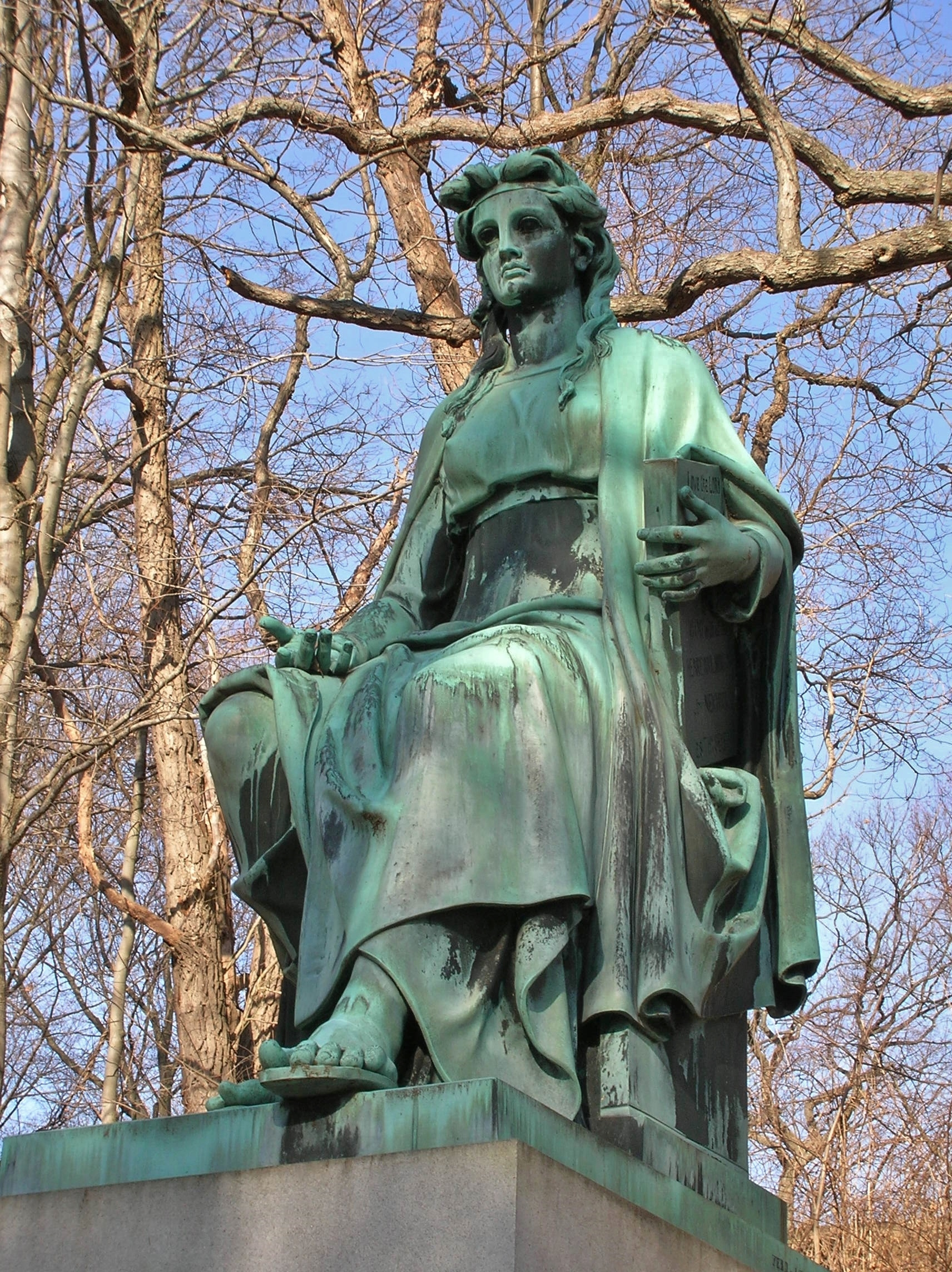
The statue, Wisdom, on the Benedict Family Monument was designed by Truman Howe Bartlett and sculpted by Ferdinand von Miller

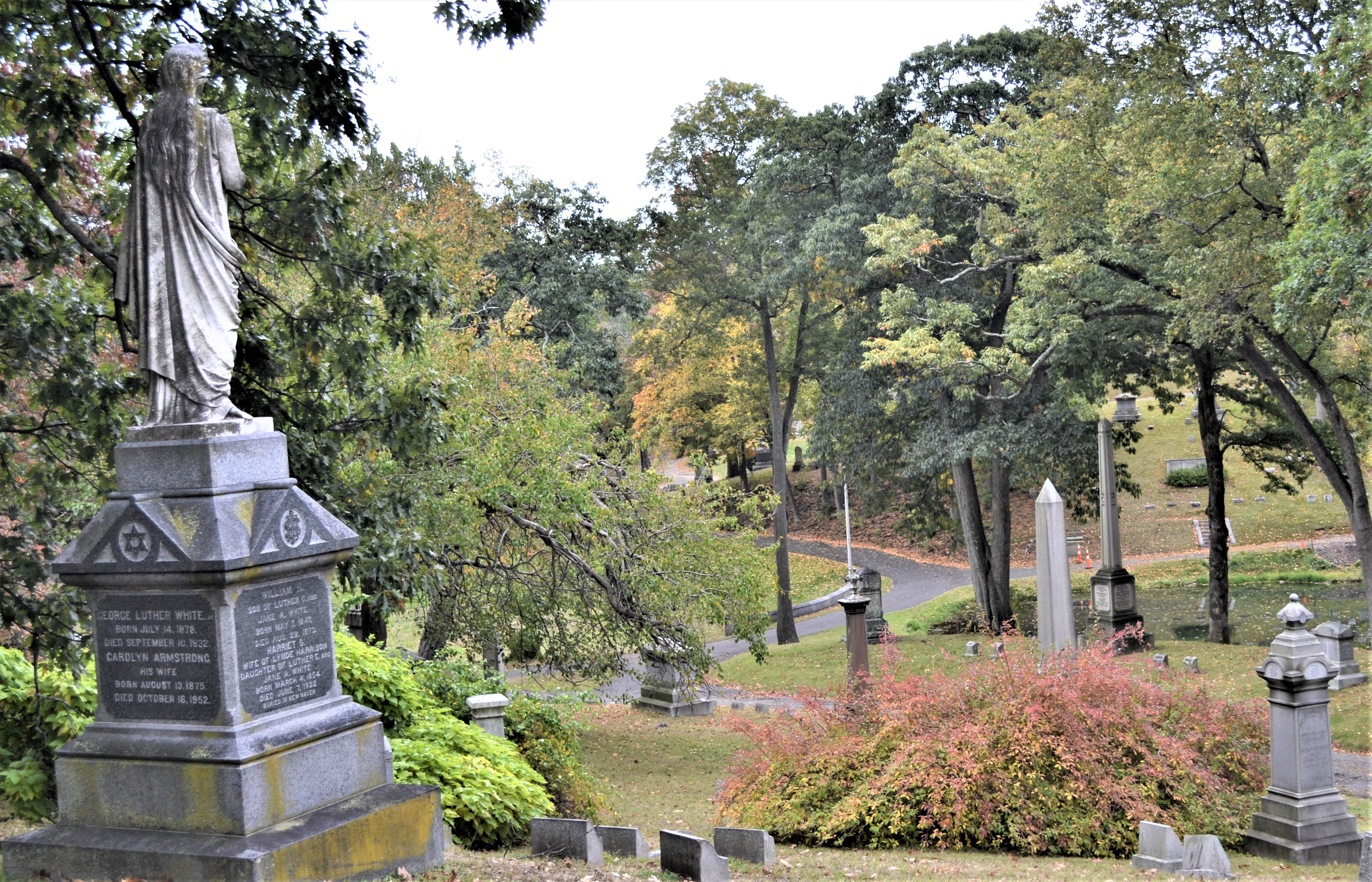
A view from the hill
