= Mad River (Connecticut) =

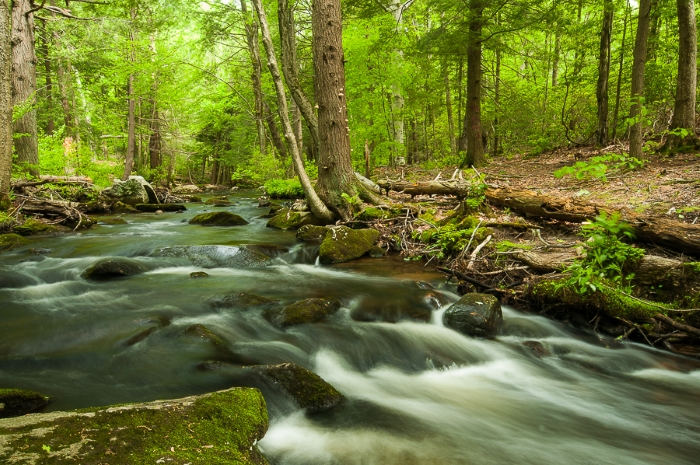
- Mad River courses through woodlands in Wolcott during late May.

Location
- Country: United States
- State: Connecticut
- Counties: New Haven County
- Municipalities: Wolcott, Waterbury

Physical characteristics
- Source: Outlet of Cedar Lake
  - location: Wolcott (though Cedar Lake extends north into Bristol)
  - coordinates: 41°38′10″N 72°58′13″W
- Mouth: Naugatuck River
  - location: Waterbury
  - coordinates: 41°32′30″N 73°02′22″W
- Length: 11 mi (18 km)
- Basin size: 20.35 mi^{2} (52.7 km^{2})
- Discharge
  - location: mouth
  - average: 56.23 cu ft/s (1.592 m^{3}/s) (estimate)

Basin features
- Tributaries
  - left: Lindsley Brook, Finch Brook
  - right: Break Hill Brook, Old Tannery Brook

The Mad River is a river that flows through northern New Haven County, Connecticut, in the United States.

== Course ==
The river rises at the outlet of Cedar Lake just south of Bristol and courses roughly 11 miles (18 km) through Wolcott and Waterbury before emptying into the Naugatuck River.

== Watershed ==
Lakes and ponds produced by impounding the Mad River behind dams offer deeper, cooler, larger habitat areas in which fish of numerous species are able to thrive. Scovill Reservoir, which occupies roughly 120 acres (0.49 km^{2}) along the river in central Wolcott, is known to support trout, largemouth bass, sunfish, yellow perch, chain pickerel and black crappie. As of 2013, the reservoir was designated a "Catfish Lake" and is stocked regularly with channel catfish. Scovill Reservoir is also known to host a significant population of bowfin, a large "primitive fish" which is common in the Southern United States but very unusual in New England. The fish was illegally introduced to the reservoir in the 1970s and has since become naturalized.

== History ==
=== Indigenous era ===
Prior to settlement by the Connecticut Colony, the broad region encompassing the Mad River was a hunting ground frequented by native Algonquian people of the Mattabesec and Tunxis tribes. The territory was known to these inhabitants as "Mattatuckoke", believed to translate to "place without trees", and it correlated roughly to what is today referred to as the Central Naugatuck Valley. These lands were purchased and settled by individuals from the Connecticut Colony during the 1670s and 1680s.

=== Colonial and industrial period ===
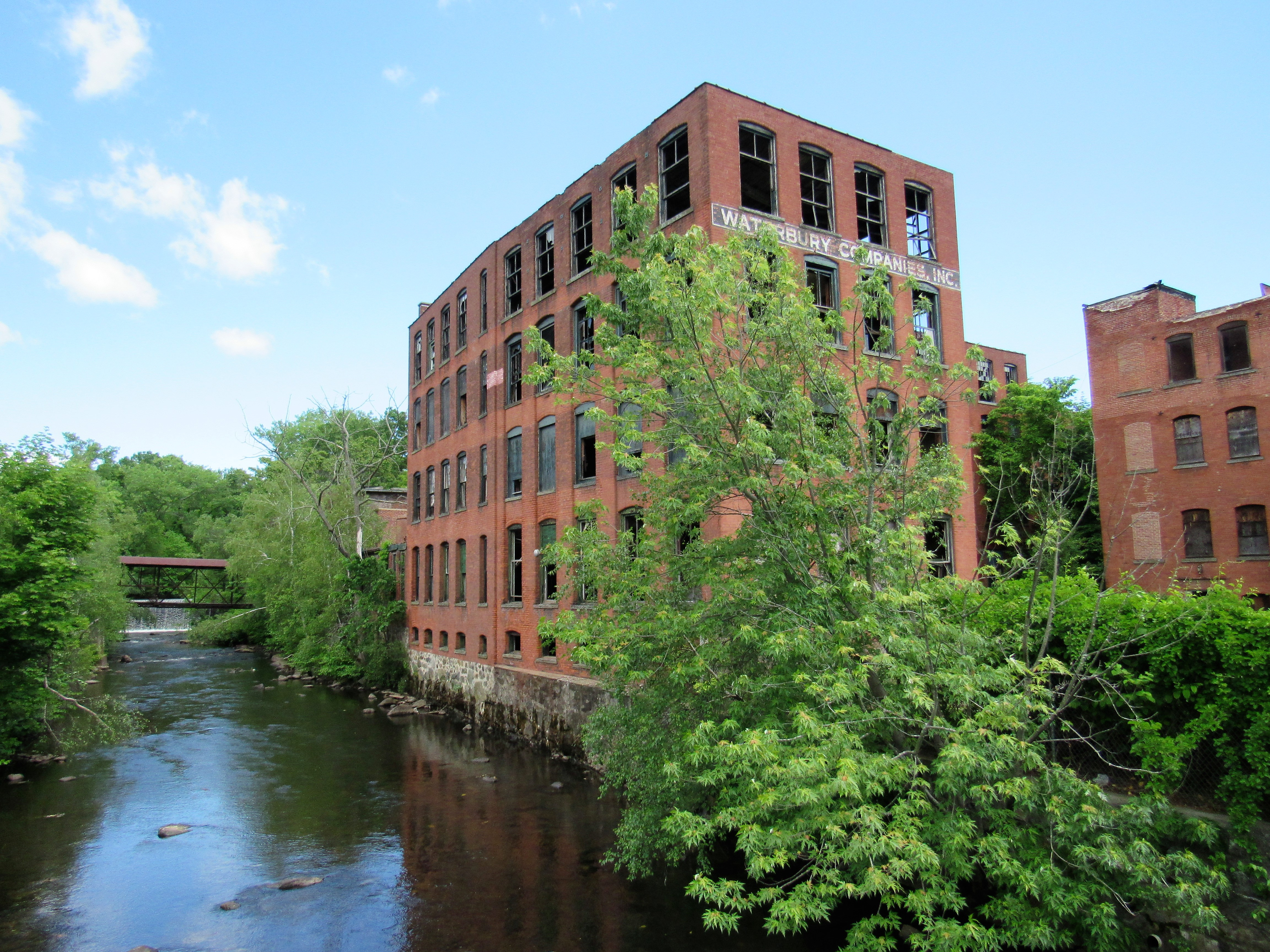
An old industrial building in Waterbury.

Prior to the industrialization of the Naugatuck Valley, local mills harnessed the waters of the Mad River to produce goods such as flour, cider and saw timber. The river's economic importance grew enormously as brass manufacturing rose to prominence in the region in the mid-1800s. Several large factories in Waterbury relied upon Mad River to power machinery, even though it's modest watershed was prone to yield insufficient water flow during dry spells. Consequently, Mad River and a few of its tributaries were impounded upstream in rural Wolcott, creating a system of reservoirs which could be used to supplement reduced water flow during seasonal droughts.

=== Pollution ===
By the late 19th-century, the lower stretches of the Mad River were known to be tremendously polluted by industrial operations. Factory waste, as well as sewage produced by growing communities, was discharged directly into the river. One observer of the Mad River in 1887 noted that water downstream of Scovill Manufacturing Company, one of the foremost brass producers in Waterbury, "showed extreme contamination; it was of a dark turbid color, with a strong odor and was covered with iridescent films of oily and greasy matters".

By 1970, passage of the federal Clean Air Act led to restrictions on the pollutants emitted from the factory smokestacks. Passage of the Clean Water Act in 1972 and subsequent environmental regulations limited the discharge of wastewater into both the Mad River and the nearby Naugatuck River. Finally, significant industrial pressure on the Mad River ceased by the 1980s when the brass and copper companies in Waterbury, which had been in decline since World War II, shuttered the last of their major factories.

== Recreation and conservation ==
Although the federal and state governments do not maintain any parkland on Mad River, some municipal parks are located along the river in Waterbury and Wolcott.

Scovill Reservoir is a recreational reservoir which offers activities including fishing, boating, swimming and hiking. Wolcott's Peterson Park is situated along Mad River, as well. The 35-mile (56 km) CFPA Blue-Blazed Mattatuck Trail begins in the park and follows the river through a woodland setting.

Further downstream in Waterbury, the 93-acre (0.38 km^{2}) Hamilton Park encompasses a length of the Mad River and offers swimming, ice skating and hiking (in addition to sports fields that don't directly incorporate the river).

== See also ==
- Naugatuck River Valley
- List of Connecticut rivers
