= List of The First 48 episodes =

The First 48 is an American documentary news magazine television series on A&E which aired from 2004 until 2024.

== Series overview ==
| Season | Episodes | Originally released | |
| Season | Episodes | First released | Last released |
|---|---|---|---|
| 1 | 13 | June 3, 2004 | November 18, 2004 |
| 2 | 13 | January 6, 2005 | August 11, 2005 |
| 3 | 12 | October 6, 2005 | March 2, 2006 |
| 4 | 19 | June 15, 2006 | December 28, 2006 |
| 5 | 24 | January 11, 2007 | September 20, 2007 |
| 6 | 18 | October 11, 2007 | April 10, 2008 |
| 7 | 18 | May 15, 2008 | December 9, 2008 |
| 8 | 24 | January 1, 2009 | September 15, 2009 |
| 9 | 24 | January 14, 2010 | August 12, 2010 |
| 10 | 23 | September 30, 2010 | April 7, 2011 |
| 11 | 20 | May 12, 2011 | January 19, 2012 |
| 12 | 23 | March 8, 2012 | October 11, 2012 |
| 13 | 17 | November 15, 2012 | June 6, 2013 |
| 14 | 16 | August 8, 2013 | December 27, 2013 |
| 15 | 23 | February 28, 2014 | November 17, 2014 |
| 16 | 14 | January 1, 2015 | May 21, 2015 |
| 17 | 30 | November 5, 2015 | September 5, 2016 |
| 18 | 22 | December 1, 2016 | August 3, 2017 |
| 19 | 28 | October 19, 2017 | October 25, 2018 |
| 20 | 17 | January 10, 2019 | May 16, 2019 |
| 21 | 54 | January 1, 2020 | August 26, 2021 |
| 22 | 23 | October 21, 2021 | September 8, 2022 |
| 23 | 17 | November 3, 2022 | August 17, 2023 |
| 24 | 10 | January 11, 2024 | April 11, 2024 |

== Episodes ==
=== Season 1 ===
| No. overall | No. in season | Title | Location | Original release date |
|---|---|---|---|---|
| 1 | 1 | "Gangs of Little Havana / Execution in Coconut Grove" | Miami, Florida | June 3, 2004 |
A wall of silence from a frightened community hampers efforts to solve a brutal murder; a mother of two is shot execution-style in her kitchen in an affluent neighborhood.
| 2 | 2 | "Overkill / Left for Dead" | Miami, Florida | June 10, 2004 |
Detectives race against time in the critical first hours of investigation to find the evidence necessary to charge two suspects in a brutal murder case; police find a man who's been shot and left for dead, but with no evidence, witnesses or even a name for their victim, the detectives have got their work cut out for them.
| 3 | 3 | "Blood in the Snow / Swope Park Killing" | Kansas City, Kansas / Kansas City, Missouri | June 17, 2004 |
An ambitious captain and two veteran detectives face their first homicide of the year and must make deals with wanted drug kingpins to find the killer of a young woman; a female homicide sergeant and her all-male team get a tip that leads their murder investigation into a dark subculture of drugs, guns and buried safes.
| 4 | 4 | "Double Shooting on Haskell / Back Alley Revenge" | Kansas City, Kansas / Kansas City, Missouri | June 24, 2004 |
Detectives investigate a shooting death and must convince a son to give up his father and investigate a murder in an area known for its drug problems.
| 5 | 5 | "Body in the Park / Ruby Street Shooting" | Philadelphia, Pennsylvania | July 1, 2004 |
Sergeant Irma Labrice and Detectives Leon Lubiejewski and Michael Gross don't have much time to find a murder suspect and they don't have much to go on either, as the victim's body was burned beyond recognition; witnesses to the murder refuse to talk to police.
| 6 | 6 | "Killing Spree" | Miami, Florida | July 29, 2004 |
Police try to convince the frightened residents of a housing project known as the "Pork and Beans" to help them track down the man who's been terrorizing the community, but after the third murder in a month, no one even calls 911.
| 7 | 7 | "On Ice / Body in the Canal" | Phoenix, Arizona | August 5, 2004 |
Employees of an ice rink arrives at work only to find the door ajar and blood all over the floor. When the police arrive the overnight employee is found beaten beyond recognition and the facility robbed. Since who ever did this seemed to have knowledge detectives turn to former employees to start the investigation. In another case a woman walking by a river in Phoenix she's what she believes in a body wrapped in plastic in the water. Detectives don't have an identity, or crime scene making this a difficult investigation.
| 8 | 8 | "Fire in the Rain / Family Feud" | Dallas, Texas / Detroit, Michigan | August 12, 2004 |
A motorist discovers a man's body alongside the highway with his genitals on fire. The investigation propels detectives on an odyssey through a rowdy world of Texas prostitutes and drugs; when a hard working Mexican migrant supporting his young family is found dead in a parking lot, detectives can't find a motive. As their investigation deepens, they must navigate a complex web of family ties and loyalties to identify the killer and catch him before he flees the country.
| 9 | 9 | "Desert Bones / Party's Over" | Phoenix, Arizona | August 19, 2004 |
Detectives Sallie Dillian and Cliff Jewell investigate a female skeleton found in the desert. Along with forensic anthropologist Laura Fulginiti, they work to determine who the mystery woman is. At first, they don't even know if she was murdered. But they use the scattered forensic and physical evidence to determine her identity and crack the case; an 18-year-old is shot in the head as a party of hundreds of high school students is breaking up. Because the teen is not expected to survive, homicide detectives Sandy Rodriguez and Tom Kulesa are called to the scene. Witnesses describe the shooter as a black male in a ski mask. In an intriguing development, there is a report of another non-fatal shooting that took place nearby, where the victim also described the shooter as a black male in a ski mask. Rodriguez and Kulesa must determine if the two events are related, who would have been after the victim and why.
| 10 | 10 | "Wrong Side of the Tracks / At Death's Door" | Miami, Florida | August 26, 2004 |
Homicide detective Mayree Morin and her team of investigators are on their way to work on a sunny morning when they are called to a brutal murder scene. A man, shot at least a dozen times assassination-style, straddles a doorway in one of the city's roughest areas. No one in the vicinity saw anything, but detectives quickly learn that an ongoing war over drug turf has recently paralyzed the neighborhood. With just hours to work with, Morin's team must move fast to land a suspect before the killer slips away; the son of a celebrated neurosurgeon is discovered near dawn, shot to death along the railroad tracks in the Overtown neighborhood. The investigation leads straight-talking veteran detective Ervens Ford and his wise-ass rookie partner Kevin Ruggiero down a shady path of halfway houses, strip clubs, and misguided wealth. The pressure is on as the detectives meticulously backtrack the victim's last steps, trying to nail down a solid lead before their trail runs cold.
| 11 | 11 | "Stripper's Revenge / Dead On Arrival" | Phoenix, Arizona | September 2, 2004 |
Hours after a jealous stripper vows revenge, her two-timing boyfriend is shot and killed. But despite a motive, the girlfriend is not the shooter and it's up to Detective Tom Kulesa to unravel the mystery; when a young father is dragged screaming from his bed in the middle of the night and gunned down in his doorway, Detective Mike Polk must separate the facts from the fiction in the witnesses' stories before the killers' trail grows cold.
| 12 | 12 | "At Close Range / Murder in Motor City" | Phoenix, Arizona / Detroit, Michigan | September 16, 2004 |
When Phoenix homicide Detective Tom Kulesa realizes a potential witness to a double murder has gone missing, he must race against time to stop another vicious killing; and in Detroit, Sergeant Jo Ann Kinney must turn to forensics to solve the murder of a man found dead in a brand new Cadillac Escalade.
| 13 | 13 | "Silent Witness / Halley Street Slayings" | Miami, Florida / Detroit, Michigan | November 18, 2004 |
When a hard-working store worker is cut down in a hail of gunfire, veteran Sergeant Pepi Granado and his team must turn to a silent witness-- the store's video surveillance system, which caught the entire murder on tape; Sergeant Jo Ann Kinney and Detective Ed Williams tackle the case of a young couple found brutally killed in their house and learn that the victims knew their killer. They must track down reluctant witnesses deep in the narcotics game before their killer has a chance to get away.

Miranda gamble

=== Season 2 (2005) ===
| No. overall | No. in season | Title | Location | Original release date |
|---|---|---|---|---|
| 14 | 1 | "A Serial Killer Calls" | Kansas City, Missouri | January 6, 2005 |
A serial killer is on the loose and Sergeant Doug Niemeier has the unenviable task of hunting him down. The question is, will he manage to find the killer before more people lose their lives?
| 15 | 2 | "Murder on the Interstate / House of Santeria" | Miami, Florida | January 13, 2005 |
Homicide Sergeant Joe Schillaci and his squad must solve a murder of an innocent college student during a hectic Memorial Day weekend; Sergeant Carlos De Los Santos and his team tackle the murder of a doctor found hogtied in his house and learn that the key to the case may lie with the voodoo-like Santeria shrines found at the crime scene.
| 16 | 3 | "Hostile Takeover / Shot in the Back" | Miami, Florida | January 20, 2005 |
Sergeant Altarr Williams goes on an adrenaline-charged hunt for a mysterious van seen leaving the scene of a brutal murder; Detective Emiliano Tamayo and his team must identify a nameless victim gunned down in Little Havana; the case takes a shocking turn when they discover the victim's background.
| 17 | 4 | "Hunt for Teeth / Coyote Blue" | Kansas City, Kansas | February 3, 2005 |
Captain John Cosgrove and his team of homicide detectives must track down a man suspected of beating his best friend to death with a cinder block before he can flee the country; Detectives Greg Lawson and Mike York are hot on the trail of their murder suspect they know only as "Teeth."
| 18 | 5 | "Downstream Drifter / Murder in Room 162" | Phoenix, Arizona / San Antonio, Texas | February 17, 2005 |
Detective Mike Polk and his team painstakingly reconstruct the final hours of a man found dead hogtied in a hotel room; Detective Tim Angell and his partners find a nameless man beaten to death floating in a creek. They must race to identify the victim and find anyone who may have known him.
| 19 | 6 | "Deadly Betrayal" | Miami, Florida | March 3, 2005 |
With Hurricane Jeanne threatening, Sergeant Joe Schillaci and Detective Olga Rome must solve the murder of the owner of a popular strip club. The club's surveillance video reveals three men ambushing the victim. Schillaci and Rome soon realize this was an inside job-- the victim was betrayed by one of his workers.
| 20 | 7 | "Roadside Burning / Blood Ties" | Dallas, Texas | March 17, 2005 |
Detectives investigate the discovery of a murder victim along the highway and the murder of a Mexican migrant worker.
| 21 | 8 | "Silence in the Grove / Show Stopper" | Miami, Florida | April 7, 2005 |
In Miami’s Coconut Grove, Sgt. Joe Schillaci and his team try to solve a near-impossible case of four men shot while sitting in their car. The shooting left an innocent passenger dead…but the three survivors refuse to name names. And when Det. Emiliano Tamayo and his rookie partner Det. Kevin Ruggerio find a local celebrity murdered in his apartment, they realize the key to the case is the victim’s cell phone missing from the scene. As they work the murder around the clock, Ruggerio learns he must make a personal sacrifice to solve the case.
| 22 | 9 | "Twisted Honor / Vultures" | Phoenix, Arizona / San Antonio, Texas | April 14, 2005 |
Detective Dave Barnes must track down desperate lovers on the lam to solve a savage shotgun murder; Detective Tom Froelick and his team find a body of a woman in a wooded area and learn that she was last seen alive with a mysterious stranger.
| 23 | 10 | "Devil's Candy" | Miami, Florida | May 12, 2005 |
Soon after discovering a bullet-ridden body in Overtown, Sergeant Joe Schillaci learns the murder may spark a bloody turf war between rival heroin dealers in the neighborhood. Schillaci realizes to prevent further bloodshed, he must infiltrate the world of heroin dealers and get them to reveal the killer's identity.
| 24 | 11 | "Fallen / Texas Burning" | Dallas, Texas / Miami, Florida | June 9, 2005 |
Detectives Randy Loboda and Phil Harding find two bodies, burned up, in the opposite side of town on the same night. Loboda's investigation leads to a motel where they find a bloody room, the possible murder scene, while Harding learns the two victims may have been killed by the same killer; Sergeant Joe Schillaci finds a man's body, a victim of an apparent suicide, but his investigation takes a twist when he discovers signs of a struggle. Schillaci soon learns the man was seen with a mysterious woman only hours before his death, but the woman has disappeared. She may be the killer or yet another victim.
| 25 | 12 | "Murder in the Driveway / Double Shooting in the Beans" | Miami, Florida | July 21, 2005 |
Detective Ervens Ford and his team learn the suspected killer of a young man shot to death in Little Haiti is a member of a notorious gang. The team must hunt him down before he flees the country; when two teenagers are brutally gunned down in the Pork-n-Beans project, Sergeant Pepi Granado and Detective Freddy Ponce learn there's a witness who saw the murders go down.
| 26 | 13 | "Deadly Attraction" | Miami, Florida | August 11, 2005 |
A man is found murdered in his bed and the killer might be working for a travelling carnival.

=== Season 3 (2005–2006) ===
| No. overall | No. in season | Title | Location | Original release date |
|---|---|---|---|---|
| 27 | 1 | "House of Blood / Last Man Standing" | Miami, Florida | October 6, 2005 |
A brutal stabbing in Little Havana has Detective Carlos Castellanos following a trail of bloody footprints the killer left as he fled the scene. It will take bloodhounds and a frantic pace to track down the killer in this whodunit; Sergeant Confessor Gonzalez has a mystery on his hands.
| 28 | 2 | "Custody of the Devil / Duct Tape Murder" | Memphis, Tennessee / Miami, Florida | October 13, 2005 |
Sergeants Tony Mullins and Doreen Shelton get caught in the rumor mill and must separate truth from lies as they struggle to identify the two men who robbed and killed a neighborhood drug dealer; when a daughter discovers her mother's body, Detectives Emiliano Tamayo and Kevin Ruggerio search for the elusive killer and learn that sometimes the harshest punishment happens outside the law.
| 29 | 3 | "Fish Out of Water / Good Samaritan" | Miami, Florida | October 20, 2005 |
Homicide detective Fernando Bosch is faced with what appears to be the murder of an innocent tourist from Ohio, but the discovery of thousands of counterfeit dollars under the victim's bed leads him to believe the phony bills may have cost him his life; when a homeless man is brutally stabbed defending a local restaurant owner, Sergeant Eunice Cooper and Detectives Ervens Ford and Emiliano Tamayo must track the hero's killer before he disappears into the underbelly of the homeless community.
| 30 | 4 | "Evil Streak / .50 Caliber" | Las Vegas, Nevada / Miami, Florida | November 3, 2005 |
Detectives Mike Wallace and Mark McNett are called out on a nightmare of a case: a beautiful young woman was assaulted and murdered in her own apartment. With nothing but the physical evidence, they've got to find out if the killer is a total stranger or someone she knows; Detectives Rolando Garcia and Orlando Silva must track down an enormous handgun that was used to gun a man down on a residential sidewalk; the .50 caliber Desert Eagle is such a rare weapon that the crime lab has never handled a case with one before.
| 31 | 5 | "Foolproof Alibi / Left Behind" | Miami, Florida / Phoenix, Arizona | December 1, 2005 |
When a young father-to-be is gunned down in broad daylight, Sergeant Eunice Cooper and Detective Ervens Ford are sure they know who did it, but when their primary suspect claims he was at home when the shooting occurred-- and has the record from his GPS ankle bracelet to prove it-- they must work against the odds to catch their killer; Detectives Steve Orona and Jeremy Rosenthal respond to a call of a foul odor coming from an apartment. When they arrive at the scene, their worst fears are realized: the body of a woman, wrapped in a blanket, is decomposing on the floor of the bathroom. The detectives are now in a race against time to try and find the killer. They chase their suspect to Mexico, hoping to find him before he disappears.
| 32 | 6 | "Fifty Dollar Murder / Murder in Liberty City" | Memphis, Tennessee / Miami, Florida | December 15, 2005 |
Police investigate a shooting and robbery at a convenience store; cops probe two crimes that are a few blocks apart to see if they are connected.
| 33 | 7 | "Torched" | Miami, Florida | December 22, 2005 |
Sergeant Mo Velazquez and Detective Freddy Ponce discover an unidentified victim in the back seat of a torched rental car. The investigation takes a bizarre turn, as detectives uncover a kidnapping and robbery plot involving a crew of drug dealers. They must find everyone involved before they all disappear.
| 34 | 8 | "Point Blank / Shoot Out" | Memphis, Tennessee / Miami, Florida | December 29, 2005 |
Detectives respond to an unusual scene, a dead man hunched over a swing set. Working with clues found on the crime scene, they piece together information and locate potential witnesses. The case takes an unexpected turn when they are able to locate and crack an uncooperative witness; Detective Fernando Bosch investigates a murder that takes him across state lines.
| 35 | 9 | "Last Exit / Out Cold" | Phoenix, Arizona / Miami, Florida | January 5, 2006 |
A man is found dead on the side of the road and detectives investigate; detectives investigate the murder of a man found dead in front of a bar.
| 36 | 10 | "Dead Man Running / Crash" | Memphis, Tennessee / Phoenix, Arizona | January 12, 2006 |
Sergeant Tony Mullins and his team are investigating the death of an unidentified man found naked on a porch. A blood trail leads detectives to a house where the occupants insist they saw nothing. Mullins must now use all of his interrogation techniques to find out what happened; Detective Jason Schechterle responds to the murder of a man shot to death outside his truck.
| 37 | 11 | "Close Ties / Last Call" | Phoenix, Arizona / Memphis, Tennessee | February 9, 2006 |
The deaths of three young people are investigated to determine if suicide or foul play was involved; a man is found dead on a lawn.
| 38 | 12 | "Pack of Lies" | Miami, Florida | March 2, 2006 |
Sergeant Altarr Williams and Detective Leo Tapanes discover a young man brutally stabbed to death in his house. The investigators soon learn that the victim may have been killed by associates in an alleged crystal meth ring. To find the killer, they must infiltrate the drug ring in order to discover the truth buried in a pack of lies.

=== Season 4 (2006) ===
| No. overall | No. in season | Title | Location | Original release date |
|---|---|---|---|---|
| 39 | 1 | "Loved to Death / Unmasked" | Miami, Florida / Memphis, Tennessee | June 15, 2006 |
Detectives probe a murder in an affluent area; Sergeant Caroline Mason and her team respond to a convenience store shooting, where surveillance cameras captured the last few moments of a man's life. Investigators must sift through the footage for clues that will point them to the killer.
| 40 | 2 | "Inner Demons / Kids with Guns" | Miami, Florida / Memphis, Tennessee | June 22, 2006 |
Detectives find a man murdered outside his own apartment. While hunting for the killer, they uncover the victim's inner life, revealing a man torn between who he is and what he believes; a tragic triple shooting leaves two young men dead and a third fighting for his life in the hospital. Detectives soon find out that the deadly shooter and his partner may be kids, too.
| 41 | 3 | "The Witness / The Trunk" | Miami, Florida / Memphis, Tennessee | July 6, 2006 |
Detectives Ricky Martinez and Fernando Bosch investigate the double homicide of a husband and wife. As they race against the clock to find the killer, they discover that their best witness in the case tragically also has the most at stake; Sergeant Ron Collins and his team must solve the mystery behind a car discovered on the edge of town.
| 42 | 4 | "Pre-Emptive Strike / Unlucky" | Memphis, Tennessee / Dallas, Texas | July 20, 2006 |
A killer barricades himself in an apartment; detectives respond when a decomposed body is found and it's learned that the victim was murdered.
| 43 | 5 | "Memphis Blues / Knife to the Heart" | Memphis, Tennessee / Miami, Florida | July 27, 2006 |
An elderly man is found stabbed to death in his home; a young man is murdered outside of a liquor store.
| 44 | 6 | "The Boogey Man / Murder on Flowering Peach" | Dallas, Texas / Memphis, Tennessee | August 17, 2006 |
A burned body found in a car leads detectives down a winding road. The victim's past is littered with danger and questionable friends; a home invasion has left one victim dead. The hunt is on for the killer. Detectives will go cross jurisdiction for find the person responsible.
| 45 | 7 | "The Run Around / Night Cap" | Memphis, Tennessee / Phoenix, Arizona | August 24, 2006 |
A man is shot in his parked car; a man is murdered and left in a bar parking lot.
| 46 | 8 | "Crossfire / School Ties" | Miami, Florida | August 31, 2006 |
A woman is shot and killed at a convenience store, but the surveillance footage indicates that a man was the intended victim and detectives try to find him to save his life; the murder of a man shot in the middle of the day is investigated.
| 47 | 9 | "Fool for Love / Dumped" | Dallas, Texas / Memphis, Tennessee | September 14, 2006 |
At a gruesome crime scene, Detective Rick Duggan finds a badly decomposed body. To solve the case, detectives delve into the victim's past leading them on a trail lined with love and deceit; a dead body mysteriously dumped in an empty field has Detective Tim Helldorfer and his team scrambling for leads.
| 48 | 10 | "The Wrong Man / Five Points Payback" | Memphis, Tennessee / Dallas, Texas | September 21, 2006 |
A drive-by shooting leads to a search for two brothers suspected of committing the crime; detectives investigate the murder of a man who was shot to death in a van.
| 49 | 11 | "Candy Lady / Best of Friends" | Memphis, Tennessee / Miami, Florida | September 28, 2006 |
Detectives search for the person who murdered a well-loved "Candy Lady"; detectives hunt for the killer of a 17-year-old.
| 50 | 12 | "Family Affair / The Hustler" | Dallas, Texas / Memphis, Tennessee | October 5, 2006 |
A young woman is found stabbed, beaten and burned on a bed. The victim's 12-year-old niece and her mother are missing. Lead Detective Dale Lundberg soon discovers that this murder is extremely personal; Sergeant Mitch Oliver is investigating the murder of a pool hustler found dead in a seedy motel room.
| 51 | 13 | "Motel Massacre / Pure Innocent" | Memphis, Tennessee / Kansas City, Missouri | October 12, 2006 |
A motel turns into a war zone when a gunfight leaves two men dead and another critically injured. Sergeant W.D. Merritt and his team spring into action to find their shooter; Homicide Detective Everett Babcock leads the investigation into the shooting death of a two-year-old baby. To Babcock's surprise, the girl’s eight-year-old sister, who witnessed the shooting, leads police on a nationwide manhunt that sends them to Mississippi.
| 52 | 14 | "Broken Alibis / A Good Woman" | Miami, Florida / Kansas City, Missouri | November 16, 2006 |
A homeless man is beaten to death; an elderly woman is stabbed to death in her kitchen.
| 53 | 15 | "Innocent Lost / Houdini" | Miami, Florida / Memphis, Tennessee | November 30, 2006 |
Two men open fire on each other outside a nine-year-old girl's home; she is caught in the crossfire and dies. With only witnesses from the community, they are forced to rely on them to lead them to the shooters; a gas station clerk falls victim to an armed robbery and is shot. Before he dies, he hits the alarms. All exits are sealed, locking the killer inside; however, when police arrive, the killer is nowhere to be found.
| 54 | 16 | "Wrong Turn / Deadly Dance" | Memphis, Tennessee / Miami, Florida | December 7, 2006 |
A local athlete and a friend are ambushed in their car in the parking lot of a jamboree. The friend survives and aids in the investigation; a tourist visiting for his son's 17th birthday is robbed and murdered. After some basic police work they have a suspect and must find him.
| 55 | 17 | "Moment of Truth / Cat and Mouse" | Dallas, Texas / Detroit, Michigan | December 14, 2006 |
A woman is shot while sitting in her car. Detective Eddie Ibarra and the homicide team focus in on two suspects swept up in a robbery investigation and the pieces of the murder mystery begin to fall into place; a young woman and her daughter are shot dead in their apartment.
| 56 | 18 | "Get that Money / Senseless" | Kansas City, Missouri / Memphis, Tennessee | December 21, 2006 |
A young man is found dead in the middle of an apartment complex. With no leads or witnesses, Detective Ed Begley is hoping the victim's cell phone can help him find the killer; a case gets personal for Sergeant Caroline Mason when a woman is killed in the neighborhood where she grew up.
| 57 | 19 | "Easy Prey / Widowmaker" | Dallas, Texas / Miami, Florida | December 28, 2006 |
Detectives are working a shooting that left a 26-year-old woman dead, when a mysterious caller gives them a one word nickname-- "Mississippi"; an elderly man is found duct-taped and beaten to death outside his house as his wife of 40 years is asleep inside. Detectives have to find out whether the murder is a simple robbery or a twisted act of retribution.

=== Season 5 (2007) ===
| No. overall | No. in season | Title | Location | Original release date |
|---|---|---|---|---|
| 58 | 1 | "Family Secrets / Clipped" | Memphis, Tennessee / Miami, Florida | January 11, 2007 |
A young couple goes missing. Fearing the worst, family members contact authorities for help, so the homicide team finds themselves in an unusual situation-- instead of investigating the loss of a life, they may be able to save one; detectives are faced with the puzzling case of a young man shot behind a barbershop.
| 59 | 2 | "Fatal Pickup / Bad Neighbor" | Detroit, Michigan / Dallas, Texas | January 18, 2007 |
A double shooting in a vacant lot leads Lieutenant John Morell and Sergeant LaNesha Jones to an unlikely suspect-- a 61-year-old man; Detective Eddie Ibarra must unravel the complex life of a victim riddled with bullets and dumped in a downtown park.
| 60 | 3 | "Up in Smoke / Shot in the Dark" | Memphis, Tennessee / Kansas City, Kansas | January 25, 2007 |
A truck fire brings Sergeant William Ashton and his team to the scene of a double murder. When the smoke clears, Ashton must track down a series of suspects in pursuit of the killer; Detective Bill Michael works the murder of a woman found dead in the street. With few leads to go on, he's wondering how to find the killer when anyone could be a suspect.
| 61 | 4 | "Blood Trail / 50G Murder" | Memphis, Tennessee / Dallas, Texas | February 1, 2007 |
A woman is brutally stabbed and left for dead in the street. When a witness comes forward with the license plate number of a van she saw driving from the scene, the homicide team must employ unique tactics to lure the suspect in; Detective Rick Duggan investigates the murder of an elderly man shot inside his dental clinic.
| 62 | 5 | "Live to Tell / Field of Lies" | Miami, Florida / Dallas, Texas | February 21, 2007 |
Detective Ricardo John catches his first case as lead investigator-- a young woman apparently raped and murdered in a vacant lot; Detectives Scott Sayers and Kenneth Penrod investigate a home invasion that left one man dead and his fiancée critically wounded. The case hangs on whether the surviving witness can identify her attackers.
| 63 | 6 | "Stray Bullet / Payback" | Dallas, Texas / Miami, Florida | March 1, 2007 |
A family man is shot dead inside his apartment. Detective Kim Sanders and Paul Ellzey believe that the shooter killed the wrong man. They must find the intended target before the killer does; rookie Detective Mario De Los Santos gets his first big case-- a triple homicide. He finds himself in the middle of a cycle of violence that threatens to spin out of control.
| 64 | 7 | "The Good Book / Nightmare" | Miami, Florida / Dallas, Texas | March 8, 2007 |
Detective Manny Castillo is investigating a brutal double homicide. The key to the case could be a surviving third victim, who is clinging to life after being shot multiple times; Detective P.E. Jones faces the ultimate whodunnit when he finds the charred remains of a body in a burning car.
| 65 | 8 | "To Die For / Highway Revenge" | Memphis, Tennessee / Detroit, Michigan | March 15, 2007 |
Sergeant Caroline Mason takes it personally when a 75-year-old man is shot dead in her old neighborhood; a man is found dead behind the wheel on Interstate 96 and Sergeant Mike Russell tracks a notorious gang to find the killer.
| 66 | 9 | "Final Investment / Writing on the Wall" | Memphis, Tennessee / Miami, Florida | April 5, 2007 |
A well-loved neighborhood investor is shot and the only eyewitness is a young girl on her way home from school. Sergeant Mitch Oliver and his team must persuade the girl's mother to let her talk to police; the murder of a homeless man appears to involve the notorious Mississippi-13 gang.
| 67 | 10 | "Silenced" | Dallas, Texas | April 12, 2007 |
Detectives Bob Ermatinger and Ken Penrod investigate the murder of an unidentified young woman found shot to death at White Rock Lake. In order to identify the victim and begin tracking down her killer, the detectives must rely on the few leads they have, from a cell phone found at the crime scene to the clothes the victim was wearing.
| 68 | 11 | "Last Dance / Deadly Deal" | Dallas, Texas / Kansas City, Missouri | April 19, 2007 |
Detective Robert Quirk is investigating a gang shooting that left two dead and four with gunshot wounds. When surveillance tapes fail to identify the shooter, detectives must rely on witnesses for information; Detective Robert Blehm is working the murder of a suburban man found dead in his pickup truck with a fist full of dollars and drugs.
| 69 | 12 | "Hard Fall" | Miami, Florida | May 24, 2007 |
A former airline executive is stabbed to death in his car. Rookie Detective Mario De Los Santos tracks two suspects and finds out that both the suspect and his victim shared promising futures-and a deadly vice.
| 70 | 13 | "Reversal of Fortune / Running Scared" | Dallas, Texas / Miami, Florida | May 31, 2007 |
Detective Rick Duggan must unravel the mystery of a body rolled up in a carpet and dumped on the side of a road; Detective Fernando Bosch takes it personally when a 66-year-old Cuban man is shot dead in the street.
| 71 | 14 | "Missing Witness / Who's Knocking" | Miami, Florida / Cincinnati, Ohio | June 21, 2007 |
A man is gunned down at close range in broad daylight. Detective Freddie Ponce and his team follow a blood trail at the scene to an apartment complex, where they believe the suspect is hiding out; Detectives Doug Lindle and Matthew Thompson investigate the murder of a man shot outside his apartment.
| 72 | 15 | "Blindsided" | Dallas, Texas | July 12, 2007 |
Detective Eddie Ibarra discovers a woman shot dead in the lobby of her workplace. When he uncovers video surveillance of the murder he is given an unusual piece of evidence-- an image of the killer. Ibarra takes on the difficult job of putting a name to the face.
| 73 | 16 | "20 Bucks / Family Friends" | Cincinnati, Ohio / Dallas, Texas | July 19, 2007 |
A teenager watching a street fight is killed by a stray bullet. With little to go on, veteran Detective Bob Randolph must piece together the truth behind who pulled the trigger; Detective Rick Duggan and his team find a victim shot and left behind a vacant house. With no leads, Duggan must turn to the victim's best friend for help.
| 74 | 17 | "Bicycle Bandits / First Shot" | Miami, Florida / Cincinnati, Ohio | July 26, 2007 |
A recent high-school graduate is gunned down and left to die in his father's arms. It's up to Sergeant Eunice Cooper and her team to track down the suspects, two teens who fled the scene on bicycles; Detective Jenny Luke is on the trail of a man who may have taken revenge on a childhood friend he thought snitched on him.
| 75 | 18 | "Last Birthday" | Cincinnati, Ohio | August 2, 2007 |
A well-loved 58-year-old man is found shot dead in a hallway, still clutching a $5 bill. Detectives Matt Thompson and Doug Lindle visit the grief-stricken wife and learn the victim was murdered a day before his birthday. Thompson and Lindle rely on the help of the community to track down the suspects last seen with the victim moments before he was murdered.
| 76 | 19 | "Floated Away / Tagged" | Dallas, Texas / Memphis, Tennessee | August 9, 2007 |
Detective Dan Lusty and his team find a man with his throat slashed floating in a creek. The mystery deepens when they dig deeper into the victim's personal life; Sergeant Kevin Lundy and his team investigate the murder of a 19-year-old man gunned down in the middle of a street. They soon find a witness whose story turns the investigation on its head.
| 77 | 20 | "Friend or Foe / Code of Silence" | Cincinnati, Ohio / Kansas City, Missouri | August 16, 2007 |
Detectives investigate the murder of a teen who was shot in the head while sleeping; detectives search for a killer who shot a man over a dice game.
| 78 | 21 | "Thrown Away / Crimson Trail" | Miami, Florida / Dallas, Texas | August 23, 2007 |
Detective Armando Aguilar may be working his last case in homicide. He must unravel the sad and mysterious death of a 14-year-old boy found decomposing in a dumpster; Detective Randy Loboda investigates the stabbing death of a Honduran immigrant found in an alley. The suspect goes on the run and Loboda needs to bring him in before he can flee the country.
| 79 | 22 | "About Face / Backyard Murder" | Miami, Florida / Detroit, Michigan | August 30, 2007 |
Detectives Manny Castillo and Carlos Castellanos work the murder of a young man brutally shot in broad daylight; on a rainy night, Sergeant Mike Martel finds a young man shot to death in a neighborhood yard. Martel finds he must rely on a friend of the victim's to help him close the case.
| 80 | 23 | "Foul Shot / Stepping Up" | Detroit, Michigan / Dallas, Texas | September 13, 2007 |
A young man with a new job is playing basketball in the neighborhood he hangs out in when he gets into a fight with some young men who hang out in a house right across the street from the court. He breaks away from the fight and runs up on a porch and in a tussle, he's shot in the head; a young man is shot outside a nightclub. The victim was apparently helping another man who was being robbed when he was shot. There are lots of witnesses, but no one will talk, as they're all afraid to cooperate for fear of retaliation.
| 81 | 24 | "Double Life" | Miami, Florida | September 20, 2007 |
Detective Ricardo John discovers a man stabbed to death behind an abandoned church. With no identification, the investigation hinges on identifying the victim through his fingerprints. When John finally gets a name for his victim, he is running out of time.

=== Season 6 (2007–2008) ===
| No. overall | No. in season | Title | Location | Original release date |
|---|---|---|---|---|
| 82 | 1 | "Shooting Spree / Lady in the Fire" | Detroit, Michigan / Memphis, Tennessee | October 11, 2007 |
Officer Anthony Wright, Jr. is investigating the death of a man found shot behind an abandoned house. Wright learns that there has been a second shooting just minutes after the homicide, and it has been caught on tape; when a woman is found dead inside a house fire, Sergeant Kevin Lundy, who spent over a year working in arson, is called to the scene.
| 83 | 2 | "Bad Call / Ricochet" | Miami, Florida / Memphis, Tennessee | October 18, 2007 |
Detective Freddy Ponce and Sergeant Louis Melancon unravel the mystery of a man found shot dead in his car. The key to the case could be the victim's cell phone stolen shortly after the murder; Sergeants Caroline Mason, Tony Mullins and J.T. Max investigate the murder of a man found shot dead in a backyard.
| 84 | 3 | "Neighborhood Sweetheart / Hail of Gunfire" | Miami, Florida / Dallas, Texas | October 25, 2007 |
A 17-year-old boy is beaten to death and his body dumped in the backseat of his car; a young man is shot to death in a parking lot.
| 85 | 4 | "Mislead / Somebody's Daddy" | Miami, Florida / Dallas, Texas | November 1, 2007 |
Detective Rolly Garcia investigates the murder of a 17-year-old boy beaten to death and dumped in the back seat of his car. To find his suspect, Garcia must first track down the victim's secret girlfriend, who may have been the last person to see the victim alive; a young man is found shot dead in the parking lot of a housing complex.
| 86 | 5 | "Motel No-Tell / Brotherly Love" | Dallas, Texas / Memphis, Tennessee | November 8, 2007 |
Detective Phil Harding investigates a brutal shooting in a motel parking lot that killed a 22-year-old and injured two of his friends. The surviving victims are the only ones who can identify the suspects. Detectives just have to convince them to talk; Sergeants Ron Collins and Kevin Lundy must track down a murder suspect who may have fled the state.
| 87 | 6 | "The Tender Trap / Bait and Switch" | Memphis, Tennessee / Miami, Florida | November 29, 2007 |
Detectives search for a missing couple; detectives investigate the murder of a young man who was shot behind a barbershop.
| 88 | 7 | "Fit of Rage / Mean Streets" | Cincinnati, Ohio / Miami, Florida | December 6, 2007 |
The body of a young woman is found in her living room, with strangulation as the cause of death. Crime scene evidence leads detectives to believe she may have known her killer; a 65-year-old man is found dead in a pool of blood. The only lead is the victim's missing car. Detectives hope to find the car with the killer inside.
| 89 | 8 | "Inked in Blood" | Memphis, Tennessee | January 10, 2008 |
Sergeant Connie Justice investigates the murder of a 32-year-old tattoo artist shot to death during a robbery. The victim's husband, who survived the robbery, only knows the suspects' nicknames. Armed with stencils of tattoos the customers received before the robbery, Justice must identify and track down the multiple suspects.
| 90 | 9 | "Double Time" | Miami, Florida | January 17, 2008 |
Detective Ervens Ford is called to a shooting in a Little Haiti café. Witnesses say it was a robbery gone bad, but just as Ford and his team close in on their suspects, the team gets assigned a second homicide investigation. The team has to race against the clock to solve both cases.
| 91 | 10 | "Dead Sleep / Tag Team" | Cincinnati, Ohio / Memphis, Tennessee | January 24, 2008 |
Homicide Detective Kurt Ballman investigates a brutal beating death in the close-knit East End neighborhood; Lieutenant Toney Armstrong and Sergeant Caroline Mason use surveillance footage to track down the killer of local teenager.
| 92 | 11 | "Unnecessary Roughness / Stolen Life" | Cincinnati, Ohio / Dallas, Texas | January 31, 2008 |
A children's Peace Bowl football tournament is interrupted by gunfire, leaving a teenager dead. With no leads, Detectives Greg Gehring and Kurt Ballman hope a witness will come forward to lead them to a suspect; Detectives Robert Quirk and P.E. Jones must find who robbed and shot a popular high school basketball coach.
| 93 | 12 | "Burden of Proof / Backfire" | Detroit, Michigan / Cincinnati, Ohio | February 7, 2008 |
A woman is found shot in her home in an apparent home invasion; a young man is found shot to death in a parking lot. The crime occurred after a botched attempted robbery of a street vendor along with his friend.
| 94 | 13 | "American Dream / Easter Sunday" | Memphis, Tennessee / Detroit, Michigan | March 6, 2008 |
A man who fled the war in Bosnia is found shot dead in his truck. A surveillance video could lead Sergeant Joe Stark and his team to their suspects; a young father striving to escape life on the street turns up dead in the back of a car on Easter Sunday. Tips from his family could lead Sergeant Constance Slappey to the killer.
| 95 | 14 | "Better Days / Wildflower" | Memphis, Tennessee / Dallas, Texas | March 13, 2008 |
Sergeant Terry Max takes on the murder case of a 78-year-old man shot outside his home. The outraged community quickly helps apprehend the two young suspects, but getting them to talk proves more difficult; Detective Bob Ermatinger investigates the difficult case of a woman found shot to death while collecting wildflowers. Each new lead just deepens the mystery.
| 96 | 15 | "Last Ride / Trailer Trap" | Dallas, Texas / Memphis, Tennessee | March 20, 2008 |
Homicide Detectives Rick Duggan and Ken Penrod investigate the shooting of young man left in the trunk of an abandoned car; Sergeants Terry Max and Caroline Mason work the murder of a man brutally murdered in a trailer park.
| 97 | 16 | "Lured In / Disaster" | Miami, Florida / Memphis, Tennessee | March 27, 2008 |
Detective Carlos Castellanos is working the homicide case of a man found dead in a motel bathroom, the victim of an apparent robbery. With little evidence to go on, Castellanos must track down the victim's missing belongings in the hopes that what the killer stole will lead to his capture; Sergeant Caroline Mason is investigating the homicide of a man shot on a quiet residential street in the middle of the afternoon. A witness comes forward who says she saw a man from the neighborhood running from the scene. Mason needs to find the suspect before he becomes a victim of retaliation.
| 98 | 17 | "Dropped Call / Derailed" | Tucson, Arizona / Memphis, Tennessee | April 3, 2008 |
In Tucson, a young man is found shot to death on the street. Detectives Bill Hanson and Mike Carroll follow two clues that could lead to a suspect – a dropped cell phone and a pawnshop slip tucked in the victim's pocket. In Memphis, Sergeant Debo Carson investigates the brutal murder of a woman whose body was found dumped on the railroad tracks. The case takes a dramatic turn when a tip comes in about a man who may know details about the murder that were never released to the media.
| 99 | 18 | "Shell Shocked / Cradle to Grave" | Memphis, Tennessee / Miami, Florida | April 10, 2008 |
Sergeants Mundy Quinn and Kevin Lundy set up a sting to catch the victim's killer; Detective Manny Castillo and Sergeant Juan Herrera are called to a brazen execution in the middle of a bustling neighborhood in Coconut Grove.

=== Season 7 (2008) ===
| No. overall | No. in season | Title | Location | Original release date |
|---|---|---|---|---|
| 100 | 1 | "Ashes and Snow" | Minneapolis, Minnesota | May 15, 2008 |
Just days before Christmas, Sergeants Rick Zimmerman and Tammy Diedrich are called to the murder of a young woman, found strangled in a partially burned car. As they fight against both the clock and a snowstorm, the team soon realizes that the killer may be closer than they think.
| 101 | 2 | "Deal Breaker / Gun Play" | Memphis, Tennessee / Tucson, Arizona | May 22, 2008 |
Sergeant Bart Ragland must find out who shot and robbed a family man; Detective Jim Hanson hunts two suspects who allegedly gunned down a local high school student as he and his friends walked home from the mall.
| 102 | 3 | "Frenzy / Hard Truth" | Miami, Florida / Cincinnati, Ohio | May 29, 2008 |
Detectives investigate the double homicide of two men; detectives search for a murderer who shot one man to death and wounded a second.
| 103 | 4 | "Last Fare" | Tucson, Arizona | July 3, 2008 |
Detectives Jennifer Whitfield and Mike Carroll are called to investigate the murder of 27-year-old cab driver and father-to-be Timothy Royce, apparently robbed and shot to death. In what appears to be a brutal and random crime with no leads, the case takes a turn when detectives get a surprise tip to the whereabouts of their suspects. Now they must hunt them down before they flee the country.
| 104 | 5 | "Last Night Out / Death Do Us Part" | Cincinnati, Ohio / Miami, Florida | July 10, 2008 |
When a young man is gunned down outside a nightclub, witnesses see a young man running from the scene. Detectives Doug Lindle and Matt Thompson hope one of their witnesses can identify the shooter and help them catch a killer on the run; a pair of one-year old twins cry helplessly in the back of a black SUV after their mother is shot to death and slumped over in the driver's seat.
| 105 | 6 | "Lester Street" | Memphis, Tennessee | July 17, 2008 |
Lieutenant Toney Armstrong and his team respond to Memphis' worst mass murder in more than 15 years, where they find four adults and two children dead. Armstrong's entire team is called to action as they scramble for leads, while due to the magnitude of the crime, the local media follows their every move.
| 106 | 7 | "Breaking the Silence / Letters of Intent" | Cincinnati, Ohio / Dallas, Texas | July 17, 2008 |
Detectives Keith Witherell and Bill Hilbert attempt to crack the code of silence surrounding the death of a 28-year-old man gunned down on Main Street; Detectives Mark Ahearn and Robert Quirk work quickly to solve the murder of an aspiring social worker who risked her life by reaching out to help a two-time convicted killer.
| 107 | 8 | "Blackout" | Dallas, Texas | July 24, 2008 |
Detectives investigate a triple shooting that left a 22-year-old man dead during a robbery.
| 108 | 9 | "Bail Out / Seeing Red" | Dallas, Texas / Cincinnati, Ohio | July 24, 2008 |
Detectives Scott Sayers and Ken Penrod are investigating a home invasion that left a young man dead. Is their suspect just a young suburban mom or a criminal mastermind? A brutal stabbing ends the life of a hard-working grandfather. After interviewing a series of family members, Detective Jenny Luke finds out that her suspect may be closer than she initially thought.
| 109 | 10 | "The Last Yard / Root of All Evil" | Memphis, Tennessee / Tucson, Arizona | July 31, 2008 |
An investigation ensues when a college football player is found shot to death near the campus inside his car. The deadly crime may have been caused by a long standing feud with a fellow student; detectives investigate a murdered couple who were found inside their own home. Their search takes them over the state line for a pair of suspects: an exotic dancer and a drug dealer who disappeared from the town the day following the homicides.
| 110 | 11 | "Moving Out / Among Thieves" | Memphis, Tennessee / Dallas, Texas | August 7, 2008 |
Sergeant Debo Carson and her team investigate the murder of a man shot dead outside of his house. The case takes a turn when a man investigators believe to be a witness becomes a suspect; a carjacking spree leaves one man dead.
| 111 | 12 | "Unwelcome Guest / Wrecked" | Memphis, Tennessee / Minneapolis, Minnesota | August 21, 2008 |
Inside an apartment, a victim lays dead from a brutal beating. With little evidence and no witnesses, the lead detective must rely on the crime scene to give them a suspect; a car accident leaves a man dead, not because of the wreck but because someone pulled a gun. As a suspect comes into sight they zero in on him and see how an accident turns to murder.
| 112 | 13 | "Collateral / Driven to Kill" | Detroit, Michigan / Dallas, Texas | August 28, 2008 |
Sergeant Gary Diaz and Officer Kelly Mullins investigate a triple shooting that left a young mother and her friend dead. The third victim, a critically injured 18-year-old girl, is the only one who can tell them what happened; a man is intentionally run down and killed by someone in a car.
| 113 | 14 | "In Cold Blood / Red Handed" | Tucson, Arizona / Cincinnati, Ohio | September 4, 2008 |
A grandfather hears a knock on his door, little does he know that a killer stands on the other side of it. The suspect flees the scene and crashes his car just down the road. Will the car be the key to identifying the killer? In a bedroom, an elderly man is found strangled to death. Is the strange man people saw knocking on doors the killer? Can detectives identify him and find him in time?
| 114 | 15 | "River's Edge" | Minneapolis, Minnesota | September 11, 2008 |
Sergeants Bruce Folkens and Chris Karakostas work against the clock to solve the murder of an unknown homeless man bludgeoned to death on the edge of the Mississippi Riverbank.
| 115 | 16 | "Snapped / Fallen Angel" | Cincinnati, Ohio / Dallas, Texas | September 18, 2008 |
Two teenage suspects are questioned when a man is found beaten to death in a stairwell. Detectives are shocked at the boys' ages and what prompted the attack; an up and coming singer is found shot to death in a car in an apparent drug deal gone bad. Could a troublesome past in Mexico play a role? Or is it just random evil?
| 116 | 17 | "Smoke / Touch of Evil" | Dallas, Texas / Minneapolis, Minnesota | September 25, 2008 |
A man is found dead in a vacant lot. With no leads, witnesses or motive, Lead Detective Rick Duggan and his team must put the pieces of the case together to find their killer; Sergeants Gerhard Wehr and Jerry Wallerich are working one of the most brutal crimes of their careers-- the double murder of a mother and her 10-year-old son brutally stabbed to death.
| 117 | 18 | "Coma / Disappeared" | Dallas, Texas | December 9, 2008 |
Two teenage boys are gunned down outside a local club, one of whom is left critically wounded while the other slips into a coma; while detectives work this case, they are pulled off to work the case of a woman missing for six days and feared to have been murdered.

=== Season 8 (2009) ===
| No. overall | No. in season | Title | Location | Original release date |
|---|---|---|---|---|
| 118 | 1 | "Gone" | Dallas, Texas | January 1, 2009 |
When Detective Dwayne Thompson checks out a missing person's apartment and finds it covered in blood, he's launched into one of the strangest cases in his career-- a case that he must solve without the victim's body. Chasing a trail of clues, Thompson and his team are always one step behind their suspect.
| 119 | 2 | "Return to Sender / Death Camp" | Dallas, Texas / Minneapolis, Minnesota | January 8, 2009 |
Detective Rick Duggan investigates the murder of a young man shot in the backseat of his friend's car. While scouring the crime scene, Duggan finds an interesting lead-- mail. He hopes this clue will lead him to the killer; Sergeants Bruce Folkens and Chris Karakostas must find the person who savagely beat a homeless man to death.
| 120 | 3 | "Crashing the Gate / 6000 Motives" | Dallas, Texas / Miami, Florida | January 15, 2009 |
An idling car has two gunned down murder victims inside; an elderly man is found stabbed to death inside his home.
| 121 | 4 | "Obstruction / Flight Risk" | Cincinnati, Ohio / Dallas, Texas | January 15, 2009 |
Detectives investigate when a man from Detroit is found dead by a gunshot; the investigation of a young mother who was murdered and left on the side of the road.
| 122 | 5 | "Blood Money / Fifteen" | Tucson, Arizona / Dallas, Texas | January 22, 2009 |
Detectives investigate the death of a man who was shot down behind an apartment complex; a birthday party ends when a teen girl is struck by a stray bullet.
| 123 | 6 | "Out of the Past / Feud" | Dallas, Texas / Cincinnati, Ohio | January 29, 2009 |
Detectives investigate the killing of a 54-year-old man who was gunned down in front of his family; a gunfight leaves a 23-year-old man dead.
| 124 | 7 | "Devil Inside / Rattlesnake" | Tucson, Arizona / Birmingham, Alabama | February 5, 2009 |
A woman's body is found lying in an underpass naked; a teenager is found shot inside his apartment complex.
| 125 | 8 | "Blame Game / Chasing Shadows" | Birmingham, Alabama / Louisville, Kentucky | February 19, 2009 |
The body of an apparent robbery victim is found near his car; the shooting of a family man is investigated by detectives.
| 126 | 9 | "Live Bait / Drama at the Classic" | Minneapolis, Minnesota / Birmingham, Alabama | March 5, 2009 |
A man meets a young lady on the bus. He gives her his number and later she calls. He and a friend go over to her apartment, but are ambushed as they enter. Were they set up or was this just a coincidence? Were the girls live bait? At an annual celebration that coincides with a football game, a man is killed. During the investigation, it's learned that the dead man's ex-girlfriend may have something to do with this killing. Is that the case?
| 127 | 10 | "Out of Sight / Missing Piece" | Minneapolis, Minnesota / Miami, Florida | March 19, 2009 |
A college student is stabbed after a night out with friends; a boy is shot in a residential backyard.
| 128 | 11 | "Shattered Dreams / Left to Die" | Louisville, Kentucky / Birmingham, Alabama | March 26, 2009 |
A Sudanese man who fled genocide in Darfur is found shot to death while at work at a clothing store. The store's video surveillance system didn't identify the suspects, so Detective Rick Arnold must hit the streets to find any leads in the case; a young man is found murdered in his home. His girlfriend was also shot multiple times and is clinging to life, but she is able to name two potential shooters. Investigators must determine whether these two suspects are indeed the killers.
| 129 | 12 | "Up in Flames / Drive-By" | Birmingham, Alabama / Minneapolis, Minnesota | April 16, 2009 |
A man is found burned in the back of a truck; a young man is shot in the back alley of his home.
| 130 | 13 | "One Heart" | Miami, Florida | April 23, 2009 |
The detectives investigating the murder of a Rastafarian must use unusual tactics when the friends start blaming each other.
| 131 | 14 | "Last Wish" | Miami, Florida | June 18, 2009 |
A man is found dead on a residential sidewalk after celebrating his 46th birthday with friends and family. Twists and turns lead detectives down a crazy path. Finally appealing to the public, they get a lead-- their suspect fled to New York City.
| 132 | 15 | "Signs of Violence / Live by the Gun" | Louisville, Kentucky / Miami, Florida | June 25, 2009 |
Detective William Brown must enter the silent world of the hearing impaired after a deaf father of three is found stabbed to death in his own doorway. As he closes in on the potential suspects, he receives shocking information which may link the suspects with another unsolved murder; Detective Frank Sanchez must seek a witness who can point him towards a suspect after a young man is shot on the sidewalk at close range during a lively street party.
| 133 | 16 | "Cold as Ice" | Louisville, Kentucky | June 25, 2009 |
A 45-year-old man is found gunned down in the snow. Detective Rick Arnold and his team track down a key witness who is forced to choose between her friendship with the suspect and her own freedom.
| 134 | 17 | "Road Hazard / Cold" | Birmingham, Alabama / Louisville, Kentucky | July 2, 2009 |
Detective Chris Anderson works to unravel the mystery of a motorcycle club president shot in the head after being run off the road; Detective Corey Cadwell races against the clock to catch the killer of a mother of seven strangled to death in her apartment.
| 135 | 18 | "In Broad Daylight / Fight Club" | Birmingham, Alabama / Minneapolis, Minnesota | July 9, 2009 |
Detective Chris Anderson and his team investigate the brutal murder of a young woman shot to death in a park in the middle of the day. Detectives must first discover the identity of the victim before they can track down their suspect and learn the disturbing motive behind her murder; Sergeants Chris Thomsen and Scott Larson investigate the murder of a young man who is beaten and shot to death outside a strip club. Using onsite surveillance and forensics, the pair rush to find their suspect before anyone else is hurt.
| 136 | 19 | "Ditched" | Birmingham, Alabama | July 23, 2009 |
When motorists discover a decomposed body on the side of the interstate, a missing-person case turns into a homicide investigation. As Lead Detective Jerry Williams searches for the friend who filed the missing-person report, he finds that in this case it's a tortuous route to the truth.
| 137 | 20 | "Caught Up" | Louisville, Kentucky | July 30, 2009 |
A parking lot is the scene for a shooting death of a 21-year old father. The detectives have video from a surveillance camera and a license plate number from a fleeing car to work with.
| 138 | 21 | "Torn / Gun Crazy" | Louisville, Kentucky / Dallas, Texas | August 13, 2009 |
Rookie Detective Kristen Downs is trying to untangle a love triangle that turned deadly; Lead Detective Scott Sayers and his team must piece together what happened inside a car that left the driver dead and a second victim critically injured.
| 139 | 22 | "Johnny Black / Stranger than Fiction" | Miami, Florida / Miami, Florida | September 3, 2009 |
A pair of homicides are investigated, including a man who was shot down in broad daylight; a man on a bicycle shoots a 27-year old.
| 140 | 23 | "Heart of Gold / Last Breath" | Louisville, Kentucky / Minneapolis, Minnesota | September 10, 2009 |
After a 33-year-old woman is stabbed to death in Louisville, Ky., police reach out to her family and witnesses to try to track down her killer; police investigate the shooting death of a college student, 19, on a residential street in Minneapolis.
| 141 | 24 | "Blind Rage / Those Closest to Us" | Birmingham, Alabama / Miami, Florida | September 17, 2009 |
Detective Marcel Walker investigates the murder of a 28-year-old man shot to death in his home. A woman mysteriously flees after calling 911 from inside the victim's home. After the detectives finally discover who the woman is, she reveals the identity of the possible shooter, whose testimony reveals a shocking twist; Sergeant Ervens Ford and Detective Fabio Sanchez race the clock to identify the suspect who stabbed to death a homeless man in the park. The case takes a dramatic twist when a tip reveals the last man seen alive with the victim was his one-legged friend. The detectives need to find out if the victim's friend is innocent or if he committed the ultimate act of betrayal.

=== Season 9 (2010) ===
| No. overall | No. in season | Title | Location | Original release date |
|---|---|---|---|---|
| 142 | 1 | "Twist of Fate" | Louisville, Kentucky | January 14, 2010 |
A community is outraged when a married couple is gunned down at home in front of their two young children. Detective Kevin Trees and the homicide team hit the streets hoping the community's strong reaction to the killing will trump the neighborhood's long-standing code of silence. Sifting through leads and witnesses, the case takes a shocking turn when the prime suspect is later found shot to death two months later.
| 143 | 2 | "Body of Evidence" | Miami, Florida | January 21, 2010 |
When dismembered body parts are found floating in Biscayne Bay, Detective Orlando Silva and his team work around the clock to solve one of the most brutal murders South Florida has ever seen.
| 144 | 3 | "Lost Highway / Out for Murda" | Harris County, Texas / Louisville, Kentucky | January 28, 2010 |
A homeless man is found stabbed to death along Interstate 45. With nothing but a body, detectives race to gather evidence to track a brutal killer; when the prime suspect in a double murder case is killed, the locals become hush-hush in a hurry. Detectives try to break their seal of silence to catch this killer.
| 145 | 4 | "10 Pounds" | Birmingham, Alabama | February 4, 2010 |
Detective Chris Anderson returns to his childhood neighborhood to investigate the murder of a man killed over ten pounds of marijuana.
| 146 | 5 | "Cut Down / 9–1–1" | Miami, Florida/ Louisville, Kentucky | February 11, 2010 |
Detective Rolando Garcia is investigating the shooting death of a local homeless man known for looking after his fellow transient friends. As the case begins to unravel and witnesses give up information, Garcia learns that the victim's commendable behavior may have instigated his death.
| 147 | 6 | "Smokescreen / The Last Goodbye" | Louisville, Kentucky / Harris County, Texas | March 4, 2010 |
Detective Corey Cadwell and his team investigate the murder of a 28-year-old father stabbed to death while working his shift in a smoke shop. Detectives cross the Kentucky state border into Tennessee in search of three potential suspects who mysteriously fled just after the murder; Sergeant Henry Palacios and Deputy Juan Viramontes investigate the murder of a 35-year-old shot to death in a local bar.
| 148 | 7 | "Straight Menace" | Harris County, Texas | March 11, 2010 |
A family is devastated when their teenaged son is shot and killed after a confrontation outside of a high school party. After interviewing the party patrons, Sergeant Wayne Kuhlman and his team learn that the victim may have been mistaken for a local gang member based on the color of an item of clothing he was wearing.
| 149 | 8 | "Alias / Duel" | Louisville, Kentucky / Harris County, Texas | March 25, 2010 |
A murder hits close to home when Detective Rick Arnold learns that the victim of his most recent homicide case is the brother of a good friend. If Arnold is to track down the suspect, he needs to discern between lies and truth-- and real names and aliases; a popular teenager is gunned down on a residential street.
| 150 | 9 | "Eye for an Eye / Dead End" | Louisville, Kentucky / Birmingham, Alabama | April 1, 2010 |
Detective Carl Payne and his team investigate the murder of a young man shot to death in the middle of the street in broad daylight; when a witness leads Payne to a suspect with one eye, he is surprised to learn what may have triggered the homicide; a teenager's body is found in the passenger seat of his car.
| 151 | 10 | "Hale Storm" | Louisville, Kentucky | April 8, 2010 |
A sleeping family awakens to a barrage of bullets from a machine gun, leaving two young boys injured and a teenager dead. With no eyewitnesses, Detective Mickey Cohn must resort to old-fashioned detective work to solve this case.
| 152 | 11 | "In Harm's Way / Jealous Rage" | Harris County, Texas / Birmingham, Alabama | April 15, 2010 |
Sergeant Craig Clopton and his team investigate the murder of man killed by a single gunshot while being robbed. With little evidence on the scene, they must rely on an eyewitness to help them identify their suspects; Detective John Tanks and his team work the murder of a mother of three shot in the back outside her car.
| 153 | 12 | "The Stranger / Prince of Darkness" | Cincinnati, Ohio / Harris County, Texas | April 22, 2010 |
Detectives Matt Thompson and Doug Lindle are investigating the double homicide of a local hairdresser and his elderly neighbor both stabbed to death and set on fire. When detectives discover that one of the victim's cars is missing, they begin following a twisted trail of clues they hope will lead to the killer; the life of a 30-year-old mother of three comes to a violent and abrupt end.
| 154 | 13 | "Mixed Up / Blind Alley" | Birmingham, Alabama / Louisville, Kentucky | May 6, 2010 |
Detective Cynthia Morrow and her team try to weave together the events of a drug deal gone bad when two brothers get more than they bargained for; Detective Kristen Downs investigates a possible gang-related shooting, but when no one is willing to talk, the team is forced to turn to forensic evidence to piece together the murder.
| 155 | 14 | "Division / Loose Ends" | Birmingham, Alabama | May 13, 2010 |
Detective Eric Torrence investigates the death of a 24-year-old father of two shot in the street; 36 hours later, Detective Cynthia Morrow is called out to the murder of a 27-year-old man found in an open field. While Torrence struggles to find anyone who will identify his suspects, Morrow runs into similar problems trying to locate the last person seen with her victim.
| 156 | 15 | "Schoolyard Revenge" | Louisville, Kentucky | May 27, 2010 |
When a 29-year-old man and his paralyzed mother are shot to death in their apartment, Detective Kyle Willett is called to the west side of town to lead the case. As the investigation unfolds, Willett and his team are shocked to learn what initiated the double homicide-- a schoolyard fight between two teenaged classmates.
| 157 | 16 | "Girl Fight / Blink of an Eye" | Birmingham, Alabama / Louisville, Kentucky | June 10, 2010 |
Detectives Mike Allison and Cynthia Morrow investigate the tragic case of a mother shot to death in her car while her three children were in the back seat. As detectives close in on the suspect, they are stunned to learn what triggered the shooting-- a fight with the victim's friend over a man; Detective William Brown is on the hunt for the men who gunned down four cousins hanging out on their grandmother's porch. Brown is faced with the challenge of identifying the suspects in a neighborhood where the fear of retaliation out-weighs the satisfaction of putting a killer behind bars.
| 158 | 17 | "John Doe / Night of the Dead" | Louisville, Kentucky / Birmingham, Alabama | July 8, 2010 |
Detectives Brenda Wescott and Collin King are hoping to solve the murder of a man whose identity is a mystery. After following all her leads to dead ends, Wescott is afraid the case will go unsolved, but then things takes an unexpected turn; Detective Jerry Williams and his team are trying to piece together what happened to two men found dead in a strange house.
| 159 | 18 | "Deadly Gamble / Inside Job" | Harris County, Texas / Miami, Florida | July 15, 2010 |
Deputy Mario Quintanilla investigates the murder of a woman shot during a robbery of her illegal game room. Acting on a tip that his suspects are from Central America, Quintanilla races to find them before they can flee the country; Detective Fabio Sanchez heads to Little Haiti to investigate the homicide of two young men shot in their living room. Sanchez must track down a friend of the victims who was with them before they were shot to find out what he knows.
| 160 | 19 | "No Escape / Trail of Evidence" | Miami, Florida / Harris County, Texas | July 22, 2010 |
Sergeant Altarr Williams and Detective Frankie Sanchez investigate the murder of Darrell Harrell, gunned down for trying to push a group of drug dealers out of Overtown. Months pass without a lead as the team tries everything they can to keep the case from going cold; detectives are investigating the murder of a man found stabbed to death in his apartment.
| 161 | 20 | "Critical Condition / Love Thy Neighbor" | Louisville, Kentucky / Harris County, Texas | July 29, 2010 |
Rookie Detective Holly Rogers is called to the scene of a convenience store robbery that left a 30-year-old employee in critical condition. With strong photographic evidence from security cameras and a trail of physical evidence to follow, Rogers and her team race against the clock to identify and apprehend the shooter; deputies investigate the murder of a man gunned down trying to protect his neighbors who were being robbed.
| 162 | 21 | "Bad Connection / Heartbreak" | Birmingham, Alabama / Louisville, Kentucky | August 5, 2010 |
Detective Jerry Williams and his team investigate the murder of a young man shot dead in an abandoned apartment. With little physical evidence, Williams must rely on witnesses to help him piece together the puzzle and find the killer; Detective Brenda Wescott investigates the unusual murder of a woman shot to death on a residential street.
| 163 | 22 | "Life Snatched" | Miami, Florida | August 5, 2010 |
Detective Anthony Reyes and his team are investigating the murder of a middle-aged mother of four shot to death in a random robbery outside a public storage facility. With no witnesses to the actual shooting, detectives must rely on surveillance footage, which could be the key to solving their case.
| 164 | 23 | "The Good Son / Jacked Up" | Harris County, Texas / Birmingham, Alabama | August 12, 2010 |
A man is found dead on a residential sidewalk after celebrating his 46th birthday with friends and family. Twists and turns lead detectives down a crazy path. Finally appealing to the public, they get a lead-- their suspect fled to New York City.
| 165 | 24 | "Silent Rage / Tainted Love" | Harris County, Texas | August 19, 2010 |
Deputy Jason Brown is called out on Easter Sunday to investigate the brutal shooting of a woman who was a school bus driver and mother of two; Sergeant Sidney Miller takes on the murder of a young father shot to death in a courtyard.

=== Season 10 (2010–2011) ===
| No. overall | No. in season | Title | Location | Original release date |
|---|---|---|---|---|
| 166 | 1 | "Carjacked / Roll of the Dice" | Harris County, Texas / Miami, Florida | September 30, 2010 |
Deputy Russell Gonzales tracks down the killer of an unidentified man found dead in a desolate field on the side of the road; detectives investigate the murder of an innocent bystander caught in a hail of gunfire.
| 167 | 2 | "Marked for Death" | Harris County, Texas | October 7, 2010 |
Deputy Abraham Alanis and his team investigate the murder of a married father of four found robbed and shot to death outside an abandoned house.
| 168 | 3 | "Winter Games" | Detroit, Michigan | October 14, 2010 |
Sergeant Matthew Gnatek and Officer Nancy Foster are investigating the murder of a soon-to-be father found shot to death in a deserted field during a snowstorm. With no witnesses and potential evidence disappearing under the blanketing snow, the Crime Scene Unit works quickly with metal detectors to uncover an item that will put Gnatek and Foster on the trail to meet three young women who each hold a piece of the homicide puzzle.
| 169 | 4 | "Off the Tracks" | Louisville, Kentucky | October 21, 2010 |
Rookie homicide detective Collin King is assigned his first case when an unidentified man is found dead near a railroad track. With no witnesses, King tries to uncover a lead from the victim's friends and family and learns that sometimes a killer may be closer than you think.
| 170 | 5 | "Underworld" | Miami, Florida | October 28, 2010 |
Detective Anthony Reyes and his team are investigating the murder of a man found brutally beaten to death below a major interstate. Reyes must navigate through false leads and dead ends until an eyewitness comes forward and ignites the case. When detectives discover that their eyewitness is leaving out one major detail in his story, the case is turned on its head.
| 171 | 6 | "One of Ours" | Miami, Florida | November 4, 2010 |
Detective Frank Sanchez responds to the murder of a retired police captain shot in broad daylight at a marina on the Miami River. When leads run dry, Miami Police launches a massive investigation, tracking suspects all the way to New Jersey.
| 172 | 7 | "Gimme Shelter / Misstep" | Birmingham, Alabama / Charlotte, North Carolina | November 11, 2010 |
Detective Mike Allison is working the murder of a man found shot to death in the basement stairwell of a house. Allison and his team quickly find an eyewitness and then the suspect. The case seems closed, when suddenly it unravels after the eyewitness disappears and Allison is forced to set his suspect free. A year passes when out of the blue, the case takes a surprising turn; Detective Bo McSwain and his team are trying to find the killers of a man shot to death behind his girlfriend's house.
| 173 | 8 | "What Lies Beneath / Back For Blood" | Louisville, Kentucky / Charlotte, North Carolina | November 18, 2010 |
When a man arrested for a domestic dispute claims his boyfriend killed someone seven months earlier and buried the body in the basement, Detectives Jon Lesher and Collin King are launched into one of the strangest cases of their career; a 55-year-old man is stabbed to death.
| 174 | 9 | "Left to Burn / Trigger Happy" | Detroit, Michigan / Charlotte, North Carolina | December 2, 2010 |
When firefighters respond to a house fire only to discover a 63-year-old woman stabbed and bound, Sergeant Kenny Gardner and Investigator Barbara Simon must investigate the brutal murder. With no witnesses, they have to rely on the local community to help them find her killer; detectives are called out to the parking lot of a restaurant where a 20-year-old father was shot to death in his car.
| 175 | 10 | "Thicker Than Water" | Harris County, Texas | December 9, 2010 |
A young man is days away from testifying as a witness in an aggravated assault case when he is suddenly gunned down near his home. As Sergeant Ron Hunter and the homicide team investigates, they learn the murder may have been part of an elaborate plan to keep the victim from getting on the stand.
| 176 | 11 | "Rules of the Game / Outgunned" | Louisville, Kentucky / Miami, Florida | December 16, 2010 |
When the Shizz, creator of a popular dance, is gunned down, Detective Brenda Westcott attempts to solve the case despite a potentially unreliable witness; after a deadly shootout on the streets of Overtown, Detective T.C. Cepero needs to figure out who fired first.
| 177 | 12 | "Insider / Paradise Lost / Bad Debt" | Charlotte, North Carolina / Miami, Florida | January 6, 2011 |
Rookie detective Norma McKee gets her first double-murder-- a young couple shot to death in their car by a backseat passenger. Inside the vehicle, detectives find what may be a vital clue, a baseball hat that might contain the suspect's DNA; seasoned Detective Emiliano Tamayo has to solve two murder cases in two days.
| 178 | 13 | "Waterworld" | Miami, Florida | January 13, 2011 |
The homicide team is investigating the murder of a man found naked, tied up and floating in Biscayne Bay. Investigators scour the shoreline in search of clues and follow a lead into the heart of a homeless encampment known as "Waterworld." The case takes an unexpected turn when the body of another man is found floating in the Bay three days later.
| 179 | 14 | "The Slip / Pure Victim" | Detroit, Michigan / Harris County, Texas | January 20, 2011 |
Sergeant Ernest Wilson and his team investigate the double-homicide of two 26-year-olds, shot execution-style in the basement. When investigators find a slip of paper at the crime scene, it initiates a manhunt that sends investigators to the other side of the country; a 79-year-old woman is shot to death while unloading groceries from her car.
| 180 | 15 | "Terribly Wrong / Settling the Score" | Charlotte, North Carolina / Miami, Florida | January 27, 2011 |
When a store clerk and father of three young children is shot to death in a robbery by a masked man, Detective David Osorio and his team interview witnesses and find that no one knows the shooter. With little to go on, Osorio must find a way to identify his suspect before he can hope to track him down; Sergeant Ervens Ford and Detective Kevin Ruggiero head to Overtown to investigate the murder of a young father of four shot to death in the street.
| 181 | 16 | "Final Call / Fatal Fury" | Charlotte, North Carolina / Louisville, Kentucky | February 3, 2011 |
Detective Brian Whitworth is assigned his first case when a woman is discovered on her bedroom floor stabbed to death. Hampered by false leads and a lack of eyewitnesses, Whitworth must rely on the physical evidence to bring the killer to justice; Detective Jon Lesher investigates the murder of a 43-year-old father gunned down in front of his house for telling a rowdy group of men next door to quiet down. The case comes to a standstill when an eyewitness steadfastly upholds the street's code of silence. Lesher must use his veteran-interview techniques to break the code and get the witness to talk.
| 182 | 17 | "Dying Declaration / One Last Score" | Louisville, Kentucky / Charlotte, North Carolina | February 10, 2011 |
Detective Kristen Downs is at a dead-end in her search for the killer of a disabled man until she discovers the victim's sons might be the key to the case; Detective Todd Burkard and his team find a man stabbed to death in his car.
| 183 | 18 | "Street Law / Standing Up" | Miami, Florida / Louisville, Kentucky | February 17, 2011 |
After a year with the gang unit, Detective Kevin Ruggiero returns to homicide to investigate a drive-by shooting that left two men dead; Detective Kristen Downs responds to the shooting of a 17-year-old boy.
| 184 | 19 | "Brother's Blood / Trapped" | Charlotte, North Carolina / Miami, Florida | March 3, 2011 |
Two men are found shot in a motel room. Detective Terry Brandon and his team catch the alleged gunmen quickly, only to discover that their investigation is actually just beginning; Detectives T.C. Cepero and Fabio Sanchez respond to an apparent suicide, but an examination of the body leads them to suspect foul play.
| 185 | 20 | "Southwick / Devil's Doorway" | Louisville, Kentucky / Birmingham, Alabama | March 17, 2011 |
When Detectives Mickey Cohn and Jon Lesher discover that their two murder victims have matching tattoos, they suspect the murders might be related. When they learn the victims' missing friend might be a third victim, they race against the clock to solve the case; Detective Eric Torrence responds to a scene where a man is gunned down in an apartment doorway.
| 186 | 21 | "Beatdown / Pistol Whipped" | Birmingham, Alabama / Miami, Florida | March 24, 2011 |
In a bloody convenience store shooting, Detective Chris Anderson needs an old surveillance system and cooperation from the victim's mother to help solve the case; when a shooting follows a brutal public attack, detectives try to determine if the murder was justified.
| 187 | 22 | "Bad Company" | Las Vegas, Nevada | March 31, 2011 |
Detective Jimmy Vaccaro and his team are called out at midnight to an empty desert highway, where a man's been shot dead in the middle of the road. From the victim's cellphone, they quickly get a lead-- just minutes before he was killed, he received a call from a friend with whom he worked at a local strip club.
| 188 | 23 | "Night Out / One Gram" | Charlotte, North Carolina / Harris County, Texas | April 7, 2011 |
When a fight at a nightclub escalates to gunfire, an innocent bystander is killed in the crossfire. Detective Terry Brandon and his team are forced to pit brother against brother to solve the murder; Deputy Dennis Wolfford responds to the shooting of a young man at an apartment complex.

=== Season 11 (2011–2012) ===
| No. overall | No. in season | Title | Location | Original release date |
|---|---|---|---|---|
| 189 | 1 | "Fear Factor / Fall Guy" | Birmingham, Alabama / Charlotte, North Carolina | May 12, 2011 |
Detectives Eric Torrence and Henry Lucas investigate the murder of a 31-year-old male found dead in a field, but with a tight-lipped community where street law is paramount, finding someone to talk is the team's biggest challenge. As the clock winds down, will the community pull through and bring the killer to justice? A man is chased down and shot to death in front of his nine-year-old son.
| 190 | 2 | "Mother And Child" | Miami, Florida | May 19, 2011 |
A young corrections officer is shot dead ten days before Christmas with her two-year-old son while sleeping in their bed. Detective Kevin Ruggiero and Sergeant Ervens Ford take the case personally-- not only do they consider the victim as "on our team," but the death of her baby boy hits them emotionally.
| 191 | 3 | "The Ring / Last Drive" | Birmingham, Alabama / Harris County, Texas | May 26, 2011 |
Lead Detective Henry Lucas is working the brutal murder of a young mother stabbed to death in her own bedroom. With no obvious motive, the investigation hits a wall until Lucas discovers the victim is missing a diamond ring; lead investigator Sergeant James Dousay and his team are hunting the killer of a man found shot to death in his car. With no witnesses, Dousay hopes the last messages on the victim's phone and the victim's family and friends can lead them to their suspect.
| 192 | 4 | "Without A Trace / Street Justice" | Harris County, Texas / Miami, Florida | June 2, 2011 |
In a remote area, a man walking in the woods discovers a startling sight-- the remains of decomposed body hidden in the foliage. In one of his most challenging cases, Deputy Dennis Wolfford must first identify the body before he can even begin unraveling the mystery of who put it there; Sergeant Fernando Bosch investigates the murder of a 24-year-old father of two gunned down while riding his bike. With no initial leads, detectives embark on an extensive canvass that proves fruitful when a witness comes forward with information that turns the case on its head-- what detectives initially thought was the motive is not; the murder is far more personal.
| 193 | 5 | "Cold And Callous" | Harris County, Texas | June 9, 2011 |
Deputy Jason Brown and the homicide unit investigate the cold-blooded murder of a 15-year-old boy who was stripped down and shot during a home invasion.
| 194 | 6 | "Snake Eyes / No Way Out" | Birmingham, Alabama / Harris County, Texas | June 16, 2011 |
An innocent man is shot to death in crossfire from a shootout that erupted at a friendly dice game; Deputy Jason Brown and the Homicide Unit investigate the murder of a 17-year-old student.
| 195 | 7 | "Brother's Bread / Into The Woods" | Louisville, Kentucky / Harris County, Texas | June 30, 2011 |
Detective Kristen Downs responds to the murder of a man shot to death while answering his door. Before he died, he told his fiance who did it, but his declaration leaves more questions than answers; neighbors find a 17-year-old girl in the woods, shot to death. The case takes a turn when the trail of clues leads Deputy James Cassidy to one of the victim's friends.
| 196 | 8 | "Stolen Lives / Family Bonds" | Miami, Florida / DeKalb County, Georgia | July 7, 2011 |
Detective Fabio Sanchez and his team investigate the murder of a man stabbed in the street. After piecing together the victims last moments, they realize they may have a vigilante on their hands; shots are fired in broad daylight on a residential street, leaving one teenage boy dead and another critically injured. Lead Detective Bruce Brueggeman is shocked to discover that the shooters mother may have been with him when he pulled the trigger. But forcing the family to give up the suspect is not going to be easy.
| 197 | 9 | "Burning Rage / Fallen Soldiers" | Birmingham, Alabama / Miami, Florida | July 14, 2011 |
Detective Warren Cotton investigates the murder of three family members, including a 12-year-old girl, stabbed to death in their home and then set on fire in an apparent cover-up; Detective Ricardo John and his team are working the shooting of a young man who has been a witness in several previous homicide investigations.
| 198 | 10 | "Last Words / Nowhere To Hide" | Birmingham, Alabama / DeKalb County, Georgia | August 18, 2011 |
A 49-year-old man is beaten and shot in the middle of a housing complex in broad daylight. In a community where no one wants to be seen as "snitching," finding someone to come forward with information will be Detective Chris Anderson's biggest challenge; Lead Detective Chris Franklin investigates the murder of an 18-year-old man gunned down in an apartment complex. The case takes a turn when Franklin learns the killer's intended target was actually the victim's friend.
| 199 | 11 | "Hit List / Hand In Hand" | Miami, Florida / DeKalb County, Georgia | August 25, 2011 |
Detective T.C. Cepero investigates the murder of a 20-year-old man gunned down in the middle of the street in broad daylight. With surveillance video of the suspect and possible witnesses they learn the victim may have been on the killer's hit list; a 20-year-old man is shot to death while walking his girlfriend home at night. Detective Matthew Ferreira and team must work quickly to solve this senseless murder that also left two others injured, including the victim's girlfriend.
| 200 | 12 | "No Return / Dangerous Game" | Harris County, Texas / Miami, Florida | September 1, 2011 |
A family man is shot down in his driveway. With no motive or witnesses, lead investigator Deputy Juan Viramontes hopes a clue found on the victim's car can lead to the killer; as a family settles in for the night, gunshots erupt in their front yard. A startled mother walks outside to discover her son shot to death. Rookie homicide Detective Frank Castillo must delve into the vices of the victim in order to track down the person responsible for this brazen act of violence.
| 201 | 13 | "Love Her Madly / Off Track" | Miami, Florida / DeKalb County, Georgia | September 8, 2011 |
The Homicide Unit responds to a scene to find the 911 caller covered in blood and a 35-year-old woman brutally stabbed to death. Before Detective Fabio Sanchez can determine if the 911 caller is a witness or a suspect, the case takes a dramatic turn when a second stabbing victim turns up at a local hospital; Detective Joe Renaud and his team are working the shooting murder of a 22-year-old man. With no witnesses, the team hopes piecing together the last hours of the victim's life can lead them to the killer.
| 202 | 14 | "Blood Alley / Bad Deal" | Birmingham, Alabama / DeKalb County, Georgia | October 13, 2011 |
In a quiet suburb, an unidentified man is found dead in an alley-- the victim of a hit and run. On the scene, detectives find a piece of the car that ran over the victim. With information obtained from the car part and a lead provided by an eyewitness, detectives are left to uncover the identity of the victim and his killer; a 24-year-old man is shot to death in his apartment during a drug deal. When a canvas provides no clues, detectives turn to the victim's cell phone to point them in the direction of the killer.
| 203 | 15 | "The Chase / One Shot" | Harris County, Texas / Birmingham, Alabama | October 20, 2011 |
Deputy Abraham Alanis is working the murder of a 69-year-old Navy veteran. When Alanis' first big break, surveillance video of the potential perpetrator, fails to show the suspect's face, investigators take a closer at the footage and notice something big-- a small detail in the video could be a huge break for the case; Detective Marcel Walker responds to the city's first murder since a deadly tornado ravaged the city. Walker needs to determine whether two people seen fleeing the crime scene moments after the shooting are witnesses to the heinous act or responsible for it.
| 204 | 16 | "Caught In The Middle" | Miami, Florida | October 27, 2011 |
Two men are found beaten and shot behind an abandoned house. As Detective T.C. Cepero digs deeper into the case, he unearths more than one reason why the men could have been killed.
| 205 | 17 | "Pointless / Set Up" | Birmingham, Alabama / DeKalb County, Georgia | December 8, 2011 |
Detective Chris Anderson investigates the gruesome murder of a woman shot to death and then set on fire in an apparent cover-up. Anderson hunts down his suspects, but it's the victim's family that reveals a final, disturbing twist in the case; Detective Joe Renaud is working the murder of a father of four, gunned down outside an apartment complex on the east side of town. Without little to go on, Renaud and his team must put the pieces of this puzzle together to track down the killer.
| 206 | 18 | "Love Kills / Justified" | Miami, Florida / Birmingham, Alabama | December 15, 2011 |
Detectives Anthony Reyes and Manny Castillo investigate a man shot dead on a residential street. The case takes a turn when they learn that the house he was found in front of is where his ex-girlfriend lives; a gunfight at a gas station leaves one man dead. Detective Cynthia Morrow discovers surveillance video that shows who killed the man, but eyewitness testimony calls into question who is to blame.
| 207 | 19 | "Ultimate Price" | Miami, Florida | January 5, 2012 |
A good Samaritan is shot dead while intervening in a robbery. Detective T.C. Cepero is forced to resort to a needle-in-a-haystack search for the getaway car and for the homeless woman who may have seen the killer.
| 208 | 20 | "Hot Lot / Blind Faith" | Birmingham, Alabama / DeKalb County, Georgia | January 19, 2012 |
Lead Detective Henry Lucas and his team are trying to solve the mystery of how a young man ended up shot to death in the back in the middle of a scrap yard. With no witnesses, Lucas hopes the victim's friends can lead him to the killer; Lead Detective Lynn Shuler and the Major Felony Unit are called to a motel where a woman has been found dead. The case takes a dark turn when the team learns that a man was in the room shortly before the woman died, but has since disappeared.

=== Season 12 (2012) ===
| No. overall | No. in season | Title | Location | Original release date |
|---|---|---|---|---|
| 209 | 1 | "Missing" | Harris County, Texas | March 8, 2012 |
Deputy Mario Quintanilla and his team are investigating the mysterious disappearance and possible murder of a 20-year-old single mother. After days of searching and only a bloody, abandoned car as evidence, Investigators needs to retrace her final steps to solve the mystery.
| 210 | 2 | "Deadly Encounter / Car Trouble" | Miami, Florida / Birmingham, Alabama | March 15, 2012 |
Detectives Kevin Ruggiero and John Rusinque work the murder of a 42-year-old hard-working janitor brutally stabbed to death in his own apartment. With no witnesses, they must rely on clues gathered at the crime seen to help then identify and track down their suspect; Detective Chris Anderson investigates the murder of a man walking home after fixing a friend's car. With no physical evidence, Anderson gets help from the neighborhood to track down the suspect.
| 211 | 3 | "Down In Overtown / Breaking Point" | Miami, Florida / Dallas, Texas | March 22, 2012 |
A young father is gunned down after a night of gambling. Detective Emiliano Tamayo has to figure out who would have killed him over $20; a young father partying with friends at a nightclub breaks up a fight and ends up murdered.
| 212 | 4 | "Tiny Dancers / Right Hand Man" | DeKalb County, Georgia / Miami, Florida | March 29, 2012 |
A keyboardist for a local church is gunned down in his home. Detective Lynn Shuler uncovers a web of lies that ultimately puts him on the path of the killers; rookie Detective Mario Gonzalez responds to a call about a man found shot dead in an abandoned car. Just as the case is about to run cold, a witness comes forward that shatters the case wide open.
| 213 | 5 | "Under One Roof / Off Target" | Dallas, Texas / Miami, Florida | April 5, 2012 |
A grandfather is robbed and murdered in his bedroom. Detective Scott Sayers has to figure out who would have bludgeoned him to death for a 26" TV; Detective Fignole Lubin investigates a drive-by in Overtown that left an innocent young woman dead. Police find a car riddled with bullets, but was its driver the shooter or another victim?
| 214 | 6 | "Bad Attitude / Collateral Damage" | Dallas, Texas / Birmingham, Alabama | April 12, 2012 |
Detective Brian Tabor investigates the brutal stabbing of a man found in a vacant apartment. Now, detectives need a woman who may have lured him to his death to come clean; a wild gunfight leaves an innocent young man dead. Detective Jody Jacobs is on the hunt for two shooters and needs to determine who fired the first shot.
| 215 | 7 | "Cold Light Of Day" | Cleveland, Ohio | April 19, 2012 |
Detectives Mike Smith and Walley Everett investigate the murder of a 23-year-old mother of three found burned in the backyard of an abandoned house. The brutality of the murder leaves a community outraged as detectives search for the killer. And just when the case is about to hit a dead end, a witness comes forward who may shatter the case wide open.
| 216 | 8 | "Far From Home / Object Of Desire" | DeKalb County, Georgia / Harris County, Texas | April 26, 2012 |
An out-of-state truck driver is found shot to death in the cab of his truck. Detectives working the case trace the victim's missing cell phone hoping it will lead them to the shooter; investigators work the case of an exotic dancer found murdered in her house. They need to find out if the killer could be someone she knew and trusted.
| 217 | 9 | "Unarmed / Bad Feelings" | Miami, Florida / Dallas, Texas | May 3, 2012 |
An unarmed man is gunned down in the parking lot of a popular bar. Detectives hope the victim's friend can identify the shooter; Detective Dan Lundberg investigates the murder of a woman found bludgeoned to death in her apartment.
| 218 | 10 | "Brutal Business" | Dallas, Texas | May 10, 2012 |
Detective Dwayne Thompson and his team investigate the brutal double murder of two friends shot to death and burned beyond recognition in the trunk of a car in an apparent cover-up. Will detectives be able to catch the killers before they strike again?
| 219 | 11 | "A Simple Plan / The Rip-Off" | Harris County, Texas / Dallas, Texas | June 7, 2012 |
A home invasion turns deadly when a woman is murdered in front of her daughter; a teenager trying to sell his gun pays the ultimate price.
| 220 | 12 | "Less Than Zero / Friends For Life" | Miami, Florida / Cleveland, Ohio | June 14, 2012 |
An unarmed man is shot in the back, but no one will give up the shooter; three best friends head home from a party, but one of them ends up dead.
| 221 | 13 | "House Of Pain / Into The Night" | Cleveland, Ohio / Harris County, Texas | June 28, 2012 |
When a friendly house party turns into a double murder, the only female homicide detective has to piece together what went wrong; a hardworking father stops off for a drink after work and ends up the victim of a robbery gone bad.
| 222 | 14 | "Night Shift / Mobbed" | Harris County, Texas / Birmingham, Alabama | June 28, 2012 |
Deputy Dennis Wolfford responds to the murder of a 20-year old convenience store clerk killed by a gunman wearing a mask; Detective Jody Jacobs investigates the homicide of a man beaten to death by numerous assailants.
| 223 | 15 | "Shattered" | Dallas, Texas | July 12, 2012 |
A well-loved man is discovered in his apartment on a bed of broken glass. With only fragments of clues, the homicide team zeroes in on a suspect, but nothing is what it seems.
| 224 | 16 | "Massacre In Little Haiti / Exposed" | Miami, Florida / Cleveland, Ohio | July 19, 2012 |
A massacre outside a corner store leaves two dead and two clinging to life. With no witnesses, detectives hope the surviving victims live to tell who pulled the trigger; a man is found strangled in his apartment. Detectives go on the hunt for one of his friends and uncover a shocking motive.
| 225 | 17 | "Deadly Ride / Wrong Place, Wrong Time" | Cleveland, Ohio / Miami, Florida | August 16, 2012 |
A man shot while driving his car sends detectives on a manhunt across four states to find his killer; a man is gunned down in broad daylight, but detectives have to rely on the tight-lipped citizens of Overtown to solve the murder.
| 226 | 18 | "Father And Son / Dangerous Attraction" | Miami, Florida / Dallas, Texas | August 30, 2012 |
A beloved father is gunned down outside his apartment, leaving his son and the homicide team wondering who would want him dead; a man is shot dead in his sleep, but when the homicide team learns the suspect could be his girlfriend, they uncover a murderous past.
| 227 | 19 | "Murder In Pleasant Grove" | Dallas, Texas | September 6, 2012 |
A dismembered body is found burned in an open field. With no leads on the victim's identity, detectives turn to the public for help in solving this baffling case.
| 228 | 20 | "Innocent Bystander / Partners In Crime" | Harris County, Texas / Dallas, Texas | September 13, 2012 |
A man is stabbed at a strip mall in the middle of the night. Sergeant Craig Clopton finds surveillance video of the murder, but it leaves him with more questions than answers; a young man is shot dead in his living room. It appears to be a burglary until Detective Brian Tabor uncovers a more treacherous motive.
| 229 | 21 | "Blood Red / Deadly Moves" | Dallas, Texas / Cleveland, Ohio | September 20, 2012 |
Two men on their way to visit family meet a hail of bullets. The case takes a surprising turn when Detective Tim Stewart discovers what they may have been shot over; a preacher is found strangled in his home. Detective Tom Armelli is on the trail of a burglar desperate enough to kill for a TV and some pocket change.
| 230 | 22 | "Blood On The Streets" | Miami, Florida | September 27, 2012 |
The homicide team investigates a triple shooting on a crowded bus that injured two and left a teenager dead. As detectives work the case, they discover that their victim was killed in an escalating street war between two gangs. Now, they must race the clock to catch his shooter before the feud claims another victim.
| 231 | 23 | "School Girls / Out Of The Shadows" | Dallas, Texas / Cleveland, Ohio | October 11, 2012 |
A fight among schoolgirls turns into a deadly home invasion; an attempted carjacking leaves an innocent man shot dead.

=== Season 13 (2012–2013) ===
| No. overall | No. in season | Title | Location | Original release date |
|---|---|---|---|---|
| 232 | 1 | "Fatal Call" | Dallas, Texas | November 15, 2012 |
When a man is found shot to death in an apartment complex, the homicide team must rely on the eyes of the community to help solve the case before the killer slips through their fingers.
| 233 | 2 | "Killer Debt / House Of Rage" | Miami, Florida / Cleveland, Ohio | November 29, 2012 |
A man is gunned down on a quiet city sidewalk. A mysterious car leads detectives on the trail of a suspect with a violent past; a young mother of five is found shot to death in her apartment. With no witnesses, detectives turn to her outraged community for help.
| 234 | 3 | "Nightmare In Greedy Grove / Good Man Down" | Dallas, Texas / Cleveland, Ohio | December 6, 2012 |
A drive-by shooting among teenage boys leaves an innocent bystander dead; a young father partying with friends at a nightclub breaks up a fight and ends up murdered.
| 235 | 4 | "The House Next Door / The Showdown" | Miami, Florida / Harris County, Texas | December 13, 2012 |
A man found stabbed to death and dumped in an empty lot turns into a standoff with the house next door; a young father gunned down in a turf war sends cops on the hunt for a killer caught on video.
| 236 | 5 | "Strapped / The Killer Next Door" | Miami, Florida / Cleveland, Ohio | December 20, 2012 |
Club night turns deadly for an unarmed teenager. Detectives need devastated friends and family to help lead them to the killer; two college students are robbed and shot while walking their dog. One of them dies, while the other lives to tell the tale.
| 237 | 6 | "Birthday Girl" | Cleveland, Ohio | March 7, 2013 |
A 14-year-old girl is killed at her birthday party when gunmen open fire on the crowd. With multiple shooters to track down, the homicide team races against the clock to identify which people at the party were the killers.
| 238 | 7 | "Deadly Obsession / The Killer You Know" | Dallas, Texas / Cleveland, Ohio | March 14, 2013 |
A young couple murdered in cold blood on their doorstep sends detectives on a manhunt across three states; homicide detectives find a man shot dead in his own backyard and learns the killer might be closer than they think.
| 239 | 8 | "Hot Ride / Debt Collector" | Harris County, Texas / Miami, Florida | March 21, 2013 |
A young father is carjacked and murdered outside his home. To find the killers, the homicide team needs to find the victim's car; a local musician is gunned down in the street and the hunt for answers leads close to home.
| 240 | 9 | "Desperate Moves" | Dallas, Texas | March 28, 2013 |
An innocent man gunned down in his car leads detectives on a manhunt for a killer on a shooting spree. As the investigation unfolds, witnesses reveal the brutality of the shooter. Detectives Tommy Raley and Michael Yeric must track down their killer before he strikes again.
| 241 | 10 | "Wild Ride" | Cleveland, Ohio | April 4, 2013 |
A father of five found stabbed over 50 times shocks friends and family. Homicide detectives follow a bizarre trail of evidence that takes the case someplace they least expected.
| 242 | 11 | "Easy Money / Ambushed" | Dallas, Texas / Cleveland, Ohio | April 11, 2013 |
A young father is shot in the back, but no one wants to talk; a brazen corner store stickup leaves an innocent clerk dead.
| 243 | 12 | "Uncommon Valor" | Dallas, Texas | April 18, 2013 |
When a good Samaritan is gunned down trying to protect his friends, detectives must unravel a tangled web of bad tips and lies in their hunt for the killer.
| 244 | 13 | "Into The Graveyard" | Miami, Florida | April 25, 2013 |
A family is shattered when two teenage brothers are gunned down in their own backyard. Two surviving friends point Detective T.C. Cepero and his team in the direction of two desperate and dangerous gunmen on the run.
| 245 | 14 | "The Girl Who Knew Too Much / The Guardian" | Dallas, Texas / Cleveland, Ohio | May 2, 2013 |
An unidentified girl is found brutally shot in a field. Detectives Scott Sayers and Esteban Montenegro discover that she may have been killed for her silence; a young father is shot in the head trying to break up a fight. Without any leads, Detectives Ignatius Sowa and Raymond Diaz must rely on an outraged community to help track down his killers.
| 246 | 15 | "The Cover Up / Bad Seed" | Cleveland, Ohio / Dallas, Texas | May 9, 2013 |
A man is shot dead in an empty courtyard. A mysterious 911 call leads Detectives Ignatius Sowa and Raymond Diaz on the hunt for an elusive killer; a 72-year-old grandmother is found beaten to death inside her home.
| 247 | 16 | "Best Laid Plans / Burned Alive" | Harris County, Texas / Cleveland, Ohio | May 30, 2013 |
A young woman set on fire clings to life as deputies race to find who left her for dead; when a teenager is shot down in the street, detectives discover his best friends may have something to do with the murder.
| 248 | 17 | "New Year's Terror / Deadly Friends" | Cleveland, Ohio / Broward County, Florida | June 6, 2013 |
A man is gunned down defending his home on New Year's Eve. With no eyewitnesses, Detective Melvin Smith must rely on DNA evidence to track down the killers; when an elderly man is found dead in his apartment, Detective John Curcio's hunt for the suspects leads to a surprising discovery.

=== Season 14 (2013) ===
| No. overall | No. in season | Title | Location | Original release date |
|---|---|---|---|---|
| 249 | 1 | "Blood Feud" | Miami, Florida | August 8, 2013 |
When two men are gunned down in a bloody turf war, Detective Jermaine Douglas must race to catch the killers before the turf war claims another life.
| 250 | 2 | "Bad Reputation / Deadly Party" | Cleveland, Ohio / Broward County, Florida | August 15, 2013 |
A young mother of three is gunned down in front of her home; a birthday party celebration turns deadly.
| 251 | 3 | "Last Stop: Paradise / Bad Blood" | Broward County, Florida / Cleveland, Ohio | September 12, 2013 |
When a migrant worker is robbed and beaten to death, Detectives Valerian Perez and Kevin Forsberg must track down a vicious predator before he strikes again; a man is shot dead in broad daylight at a car wash and Detectives Lem Griffin and Art Echols fear their case will go cold when none of the witnesses will talk.
| 252 | 4 | "When A Stranger Calls / Sweet 16" | Dallas, Texas / Cleveland, Ohio | October 3, 2013 |
An elderly woman is beaten and strangled in her home. When the victim's missing bank card starts being used detectives follow the trail hoping it will lead to her killer; a 16-year-old honors student is found shot in her own back yard and a note she left behind may be the only clue to solving the case.
| 253 | 5 | "Deadly Morning" | Cleveland, Ohio | October 10, 2013 |
A young mother walking alone to work is viscously murdered and dumped in an abandoned house. As the community reels in shock at the horrific crime, Detectives Ignatius Sowa and Ray Diaz make a surprising discovery about the killer.
| 254 | 6 | "Brother's Keeper / Fighting Words" | Cleveland, Ohio / Dallas, Texas | October 17, 2013 |
An innocent man is gunned down in a gang war and detectives race to find his killers before any more blood is shed; a father is murdered close to home and detectives need his neighbors to give them a lead.
| 255 | 7 | "A Date With Death / Paid In Blood" | Cleveland, Ohio / Dallas, Texas | October 24, 2013 |
For Detectives Kathleen Carlin and Tim Entenok, friends are the key to solving the murder of a father shot in the back; can a surprising lead help Detective Brian Tabor catch up to the killer of an elderly man stabbed to death in his home?
| 256 | 8 | "Kiss Of Death" | Rochester, New York | November 14, 2013 |
A man from a neighboring suburb is found shot to death on a city street. The Major Crimes Unit tries to piece together the last hours of the victim's life to discover what may have brought him there, and find that his wife may hold the key to solving the murder.
| 257 | 9 | "Dead End Drive / The Fixer" | Dallas, Texas / Cleveland, Ohio | November 28, 2013 |
Detective Dwayne Thompson hunts for a band of carjacking killers that are terrorizing a neighborhood; an argument among friends spins out of control when one of them makes a deadly decision.
| 258 | 10 | "Bound And Burned" | Dallas, Texas | November 28, 2013 |
When an expectant father is found bound and burned in a creek bed, Detective Scott Sayers must unravel a deadly robbery plot to identify his suspects and bring them to justice.
| 259 | 11 | "Game Over / Long Walk Home" | New Orleans, Louisiana | December 12, 2013 |
A young man is executed and detectives have nothing to go on, not even the victim's name, but the key to finding his killer may be right in front of them; while walking home from work, a beloved young woman is gunned down on the street, leaving a community devastated and detectives on a mission to find her killer.
| 260 | 12 | "For A Quick Buck / Bloody Sunday" | Cleveland, Ohio / Dallas, Texas | December 12, 2013 |
A young father is executed in his home and his family is terrorized by masked gunmen. Detectives believe the victim's friend holds the key to finding the killers, but he's nowhere to be found; an innocent teen is gunned down with an assault rifle, putting detectives on the hunt for a dangerous killer.
| 261 | 13 | "Murder Rap" | Cleveland, Ohio | December 19, 2013 |
When a bullied teen is gunned down outside a public library, detectives are shocked to discover the motive behind this senseless attack.
| 262 | 14 | "Jacked / Fallen Idol" | Dallas, Texas / Miami, Florida | December 19, 2013 |
A young father is ambushed at a gas station and Detective Steve David needs to track down the killers before the trail goes cold; a beloved local rapper is gunned down at his car wash and detectives suspect it was an inside job.
| 263 | 15 | "Calling For A Killer / Boiling Point" | Broward County, Florida / Dallas, Texas | December 26, 2013 |
A highway shooting sends detectives on the hunt for a team of killers; a case of three friends executed outside a night club takes a turn when detectives discover it was caught on video.
| 264 | 16 | "Teardrops / Almost Home" | Dallas, Texas / Cleveland, Ohio | December 26, 2013 |
A man is shot dead by a car thief and detectives race to find the stolen vehicle before the killer gets away; detectives hunt for a witness to identify the shooter of a young man robbed and killed outside a party.

=== Season 15 (2014) ===
| No. overall | No. in season | Title | Location | Original release date |
|---|---|---|---|---|
| 265 | 1 | "Heartless" | New Orleans, Louisiana | February 28, 2014 |
The brutal murder of a mother and her two children sends Detective Darrell Doucette on the hunt for a suspect the victims may have known.
| 266 | 2 | "Run And Gun / Lonesome Highway" | New Orleans, Louisiana / Dallas, Texas | March 7, 2014 |
Detective Maggie Darling is on the hunt for the killers who gunned down a recent high school graduate; Detective Steve David races to identify a woman found shot and dumped on the side of the highway before the killer's trail goes cold.
| 267 | 3 | "The Rookie / Cornered" | Cleveland, Ohio / New Orleans, Louisiana | April 10, 2014 |
When a father is robbed and shot in the street, Detective Kathy Cruz faces her first case as lead and discovers that her suspect is one of Ohio's most dangerous criminals; Detective Justin Rice struggles to find a witness when a neighborhood is scared silent in the brazen daytime shooting of an innocent man.
| 268 | 4 | "The Graveyard Shift" | Cleveland, Ohio | April 17, 2014 |
The murder of an innocent store clerk is caught on tape and when Detectives Bob Ford and Tom Armelli discover the suspects' violent history, they pull out all the stops to track down the gunmen before more blood is shed.
| 269 | 5 | "Abandoned By The Bayou" | New Orleans, Louisiana | April 24, 2014 |
When a mother of five is found bound and executed in a vacant lot, Detectives Mike McCleery and Bob Bachelder race to piece together the final hours of her life to catch her vicious killer before he strikes again.
| 270 | 6 | "Million Dollar Question" | Cleveland, Ohio | May 1, 2014 |
A man is found in a dark alley, shot multiple times and left for dead. Detectives Ray Diaz and Kathy Cruz put their lives on the line to untangle a web of lies and bring the killer to justice.
| 271 | 7 | "Trust No One / Risky Business" | Cleveland, Ohio / Dallas, Texas | May 8, 2014 |
After a beloved neighbor is murdered in his own home, Detective Art Echols is on the hunt for a killer who may be closer than he thinks; after a robbery leaves one man dead and another severely wounded, Detective Steve David needs to track down two killers before they strike again.
| 272 | 8 | "Killer Connection / Bloody Birthday" | Dallas, Texas / Cleveland, Ohio | May 29, 2014 |
A young father is shot dead outside a bar, and the killer is caught on video, but can detectives find someone to identify him? A mother of six is gunned down on her birthday, leaving her family devastated and the homicide team desperate to figure out who pulled the trigger.
| 273 | 9 | "Safe House" | Dallas, Texas | June 19, 2014 |
A man is found shot dead on his front porch and the homicide team finds almost a million dollars in his home. Detective Rick Duggan must track down two suspects with a history of violence before they strike again.
| 274 | 10 | "Deadly Secret / Behind Closed Doors" | Dallas, Texas / Cleveland, Ohio | June 26, 2014 |
When a young father is gunned down in front of his house, Detective Steve David discovers that the victim had a secret that may have led to his murder; a mother is found strangled and burned in her kitchen, but Detectives Ignatius Sowa and Ray Diaz have no witnesses and little evidence to track down her killer.
| 275 | 11 | "Cold Embrace" | Cleveland, Ohio | July 3, 2014 |
After a man is found dead in his car, the autopsy reveals he was strangled to death. Detectives Ignatius Sowa and Ray Diaz take the case and uncover a secret relationship that could lead them to their killer. But with Sowa's retirement right around the corner, can he solve the murder before the case goes cold?
| 276 | 12 | "Cold Betrayal" | Cleveland, Ohio | July 10, 2014 |
A man is gunned down at home in front of his family just a few days before Christmas. Detectives Tom Armelli and Bob Ford must delve into the dangerous business of drug dealing to hunt down the killers.
| 277 | 13 | "Graveyard Love" | New Orleans, Louisiana | July 17, 2014 |
A man is ambushed in front of his grandmother's house. Detectives Jeffrey Vappie and Tim Bender suspect a woman close to the victim may have arranged the shooting, but they need hard evidence to prove it and quickly before it's too late.
| 278 | 14 | "Crossing The Line / The Landlord" | Cleveland, Ohio / Broward County, Florida | August 7, 2014 |
When a young man is shot down in broad daylight, a victim of gang warfare, Detectives Ray Diaz and Ignatius Sowa need to track down two killers before the violence escalates; a man is shot in the head but still clinging to life as Detectives Valerian Perez and Kevin Forsberg race to get their shooter off the streets.
| 279 | 15 | "Bad Medicine" | New Orleans, Louisiana | August 14, 2014 |
Detective Ryan Vaught investigates a gruesome and horrific murder: a grandmother and her four-year-old grandson shot in her bedroom, leaving the grandmother dead and the four-year-old struggling to survive.
| 280 | 16 | "The Case That Haunts Me: A 10th Anniversary Special" | Memphis, Tennessee / Minneapolis, Minnesota / Broward County, Florida | August 21, 2014 |
This special, two hour program features several well-known First 48 detectives retelling the most haunting cases from their careers. Through interviews, dramatic recreations and real case materials, these true crime stories will bring the viewer closer than ever to the personal and professional challenges faced by some of the most veteran First 48 investigators.
| 281 | 17 | "Senior Year" | New Orleans, Louisiana | September 18, 2014 |
A promising high-school senior is shot to death and stuffed into the trunk of his car a week before Christmas.
| 282 | 18 | "Shattered Glass" | New Orleans, Louisiana | September 25, 2014 |
When a young mother is found beaten to death in her home, Detective Greg Johnson must fight to prove he has enough evidence against her killer before he walks free.
| 283 | 19 | "Broad Daylight" | New Orleans, Louisiana | October 2, 2014 |
A New Orleans detective searches for a witness in the case of a woman who was killed in broad daylight.
| 284 | 20 | "Family Ties / A Good Neighbor" | Dallas, Texas / New Orleans, Louisiana | October 9, 2014 |
When a husband is shot in his bed after an Easter party, Detective Michael Yeric suspects that the victim's wife may be hiding a dark secret; Detective Tanisha Sykes must solve the mystery of why a popular DJ is found bound and executed before his killer strikes again.
| 285 | 21 | "Murder in Treme" | New Orleans, Louisiana | October 16, 2014 |
When a woman is found slashed to death, the investigation into her murder leads Detectives Travis Chuck Ward and Rob Barrere to a house of horrors and they discover the killer may be someone they least expected.
| 286 | 22 | "Red Brick / Last Kiss" | Cleveland, Ohio / Dallas, Texas | October 23, 2014 |
When a grandmother is strangled and left to die on a vacant lot, Detectives Bob Ford and Tom Armelli need to find out if her killing is related to the others; a young father is shot to death in his girlfriend's arms, in the back of his car. Detective Leo Gonzalez must find the killer before more bloodshed occurs.
| 287 | 23 | "Dark Waters" | New Orleans, Louisiana | November 20, 2014 |
Detective Ryan Vaught takes on his most challenging case yet when a young married couple goes missing and one of them is found dead in a river.

=== Season 16 (2015) ===
| No. overall | No. in season | Title | Location | Original release date |
|---|---|---|---|---|
| 288 | 1 | "Dead Wrong" | New Orleans, Louisiana | January 1, 2015 |
A homicide detective hopes that surveillance footage can help him solve the case of a young father abducted and shot to death in the street.
| 289 | 2 | "Ringside Seat" | Tulsa, Oklahoma | January 8, 2015 |
Homicide detectives wander into a dark world of drugs and prostitution to solve an execution-style murder in a motel parking lot.
| 290 | 3 | "Lying in Wait / With This Ring" | Atlanta, Georgia | January 22, 2015 |
Two men are ambushed at gunpoint and only one survives the ordeal; a wedding ring provides a clue in the case of a mother's fatal stabbing.
| 291 | 4 | "The Passenger / Death Call" | Tulsa, Oklahoma / New Orleans, Louisiana | January 29, 2015 |
A man is gunned down behind the wheel of his car; a woman receives a warning that her son is about to be murdered.
| 292 | 5 | "Rocky Road / Something She Said" | Atlanta, Georgia / Tulsa, Oklahoma | February 5, 2015 |
A man is shot to death at an illegal after-hours establishment; a detective makes a shocking discovery while probing the double murder of two young lovers.
| 293 | 6 | "Fast Friends / The Thin Line" | Cleveland, Ohio / Tulsa, Oklahoma | February 12, 2015 |
A young father is murdered in his car and the police suspect his friend has information on the killer's identity; homicide detectives hunt for a shotgun-toting killer.
| 294 | 7 | "Stray Shot" | Tulsa, Oklahoma | February 26, 2015 |
Detectives encounter a neighborhood under siege by young thugs after a man is killed in his home by a stray gunshot.
| 295 | 8 | "Cranked" | Tulsa, Oklahoma | March 9, 2015 |
Detective Justin Ritter's investigation into the stabbing of an innocent father leads him into the dangerous world of methamphetamine addiction.
| 296 | 9 | "Neighborhood Watch / Eye in the Skye" | New Orleans, Louisiana | March 16, 2015 |
Homicide detectives investigate the case of a man who was gunned down in the street and a coldblooded killing in a convenience store.
| 297 | 10 | "Bad Love" | Tulsa, Oklahoma | April 2, 2015 |
A young woman is brutally gunned down in broad daylight. Detective Justin Ritter suspects the witnesses know more than they are saying.
| 298 | 11 | "Soldier Down / Blood Vendetta" | Atlanta, Georgia | April 9, 2015 |
A young father is gunned down in cold blood at an abandoned car wash. As Detective Dwayne Sutton starts to track down the shooter, he learns the trail may lead to the Bloods gang; when a Gulf War veteran is found shot to death in a park, Detective Michael Young has to delve deep into a dangerous underworld to find out why.
| 299 | 12 | "Night Run" | Atlanta, Georgia | April 30, 2015 |
When a young father is ambushed by a pack of brazen shooters, Detective Summer Benton uncovers the shocking reason for his murder.
| 300 | 13 | "Closing Time / Family Matters" | Atlanta, Georgia / New Orleans, Louisiana | May 14, 2015 |
The brutal murder of a foreign exchange student is caught on video; a shooting at a car wash becomes a family affair.
| 301 | 14 | "Last Run / Mean Mugging" | New Orleans, Louisiana / Atlanta, Georgia | May 21, 2015 |
A late night pizza delivery turns deadly; a young man goes out to buy cigarettes and winds up murdered.

=== Season 17 (2015–2016) ===
| No. overall | No. in season | Title | Location | Original release date |
|---|---|---|---|---|
| 302 | 1 | "House on Madrona Street" | Atlanta, Georgia | November 5, 2015 |
A young woman is found on the floor of an abandoned house, naked and strangled to death. As the investigation unfolds, further horrors are revealed and Detective Scott DeMeester must act fast before his suspect kills again.
| 303 | 2 | "Blood on Bourbon" | New Orleans, Louisiana | November 12, 2015 |
A mass shooting on innocent bystanders and tourists in the heart of the French Quarter leaves the city demanding answers. Using the shocking surveillance footage of the crime to piece together what happened, the homicide team works around the clock to bring the killers to justice.
| 304 | 3 | "Blood Lust" | Atlanta, Georgia | November 19, 2015 |
A killer terrorizes Atlanta and investigators try to track him down.
| 305 | 4 | "Secrets and Lies" | Tulsa, Oklahoma | December 3, 2015 |
A young woman is executed on a street corner and investigator Nathan Schilling discovers that her circle of friends may be hiding information about the murder. He must uncover their secret before a killer goes free.
| 306 | 5 | "Murder on Maiden Lane" | Atlanta, Georgia | December 10, 2015 |
A young father is gunned down by a brutal robbing crew and Detective Tracy Lewis discovers on her first case that she may be chasing the wrong suspect.
| 307 | 6 | "Last Shift" | Tulsa, Oklahoma | December 17, 2015 |
A vicious assault on a crowded barbershop leaves multiple people wounded and an innocent barber dead. Detective John Brown delves deep into a dangerous world of gang violence to catch a killer on the loose with an AK47 assault rifle.
| 308 | 7 | "M.I.A." | Tulsa, Oklahoma | January 7, 2016 |
A welder has vanished under very suspicious circumstances and homicide gets the case. Detective Matt Frazier and the rest of the team suspect foul play as they dive deep into the mystery surrounding the man's life.
| 309 | 8 | "Knock Knock" | Tulsa, Oklahoma | January 14, 2016 |
A man from out of town is found dead in his motel room and Detective Michael Zenoni must wade through a web of secrets and lies to uncover the truth.
| 310 | 9 | "The Third Man / Cash Money Murder" | Tulsa, Oklahoma / New Orleans, Louisiana | January 21, 2016 |
When a popular hip-hop promoter is gunned down next to his limousine, the search for the killer leads Detective Clinton Givens to more than he bargained for; a friendly night of drinking at a senior center apartment complex leaves one man dead and another wounded. Detective Mark Kennedy must find a third man who was there to uncover what happened.
| 311 | 10 | "Moonie / Dark Impulse" | New Orleans, Louisiana / Atlanta, Georgia | January 28, 2016 |
The day before Thanksgiving turns tragic when a woman is found stabbed to death and stuffed in a trash bin. Detective Bruce Brueggeman spends the holiday uncovering the victim's tragic downward spiral of addiction in search of her killer; a mother finds her 25-year-old son stabbed and bleeding to death on the floor of their home. She says the victim's friend and girlfriend were both in the apartment at the time, but neither knows the victim died from his injury-- a fact Detective Smith keeps hidden until he can unravel the truth.
| 312 | 11 | "Bloody Valentine / Storm Warning" | Tulsa, Oklahoma / Atlanta, Georgia | February 4, 2016 |
A young father is shot to death while visiting his son and Detective Justin Ritter discovers the child's mother holds the key to the case; a home invasion leaves a teenager killed and two others wounded and Detective Summer Benton learns the shooting may have been a contract killing.
| 313 | 12 | "The Case That Haunts Me" | Memphis, Tennessee / Florida | February 11, 2016 |
In 2008, an intruder savagely attacks a family in their home, leaving bloody clues that Sergeants Tony Mullins and Caroline Mason must piece together in pursuit of the killer; a severed head in the Florida everglades in 2007 challenges rookie detective Scott Champagne and his veteran partner John Berrena to unravel the mystery of the victim's identity and track down an elusive murderer.
| 314 | 13 | "The Case That Haunts Me" | Florida / Tennessee | February 18, 2016 |
Veteran homicide Lieutenant Rick Zimmerman recalls the case of a woman and two young boys who were tortured before being brutally murdered.
| 315 | 14 | "In a Lonely Place" | New Orleans, Louisiana | March 10, 2016 |
A young mother is found shot and burned in the trunk of her car when a night out on the town becomes her last.
| 316 | 15 | "Broken Home" | New Orleans, Louisiana | March 17, 2016 |
A young mother is ambushed at home and shot at close range. Detective Rob Barrere's case depends solely on the eyewitness account of a four-year-old girl and leads to another brutal death, the suicide of the suspect.
| 317 | 16 | "The Fighter / Final Ride" | New Orleans, Louisiana / Atlanta, Georgia | March 24, 2016 |
A young father is cut down by a hail of bullets, when he and his friends are ambushed in a parked car; feuding households within the same apartment complex collide, leaving a promising boxer shot dead and his brother bent on revenge.
| 318 | 17 | "The Ties That Bind" | Atlanta, Georgia | March 31, 2016 |
When a man is gunned down with an AR-15 in his home, detective Kevin Leonpacher discovers the victim's wife holds a dark secret that could tear their family apart.
| 319 | 18 | "Old Wounds" | Tulsa, Oklahoma | April 7, 2016 |
A young woman is killed in a drive by shooting while her boyfriend-- the apparent target of the shooting-- walks away unscathed. Detective Ronnie Leatherman talk to a group of teenagers and delves into a long simmering feud to find her killer.
| 320 | 19 | "Bloodline" | Tulsa, Oklahoma | April 14, 2016 |
When a former Marine is gunned down trying to recover his stolen bicycle, Detective Matt Frazier goes on the hunt for an elusive criminal family.
| 321 | 20 | "Dark Corners / Gundown" | New Orleans, Louisiana / Atlanta, Georgia | April 21, 2016 |
A transgender woman is shot four times in an apparent robbery; two men draw guns in an underground mall, but only one survives.
| 322 | 21 | "Down on Bourbon / Deadly Trap" | New Orleans, Louisiana / Tulsa, Oklahoma | May 19, 2016 |
A mass shooting on Bourbon Street has the Big Easy on edge; a man killed by a shotgun blast may have been lured into a trap.
| 323 | 22 | "House of Cards" | Tulsa, Oklahoma | May 26, 2016 |
A lethal combination of guns and meth leaves a young man dead. Five potential witnesses tell fragmented stories which Detective Justin Ritter must piece together to reveal the real killer.
| 324 | 23 | "Mother of Two" | Tulsa, Oklahoma | June 23, 2016 |
When a young mother is found naked and strangled to death in her car, Detective John Brown uncovers a dark obsession that may have turned deadly.
| 325 | 24 | "Snapshot" | Tulsa, Oklahoma | June 30, 2016 |
A young mother is found shot to death on the side of a road; a photograph taken immediately before the murder provides police with their only clue.
| 326 | 25 | "1,000 Cuts / Draw" | Tulsa, Oklahoma / Atlanta, Georgia | July 7, 2016 |
A killer viciously stabs a mother with a butcher knife; a game of dominoes leads to gunfire, claiming the life of a beloved patriarch.
| 327 | 26 | "Sudden Death / Devil at the Door" | New Orleans, Louisiana | July 14, 2016 |
A detective battles fear and distrust on the street as he works the case of a man who was executed in broad daylight; a man witnesses the murder of his teenage son.
| 328 | 27 | "The Invitation" | Tulsa, Oklahoma | July 21, 2016 |
When a young man is shot to death at a motel party, Detective Justin Ritter discovers a photo posted on Facebook may have triggered a dangerous chain of events.
| 329 | 28 | "Bad Tempered / The Bully" | Atlanta, Georgia | July 28, 2016 |
A caretaker is gunned down over a grudge; a young man loses his life when a bully goes too far.
| 330 | 29 | "Room for the Night / Down and Out" | New Orleans, Louisiana / Atlanta, Georgia | August 4, 2016 |
Detective Rob Barrere investigates when three men meet in a motel room and one of them ends up dead; Detective Ronnie Leatherman catches the case of a man stabbed 21 times when a night of drinking ignites a murderous rage.
| 331 | 30 | "Chopper" | Atlanta, Georgia | September 5, 2016 |
When a father of two is gunned down with an AK-47, rookie detective Scott Berhalter must sift through lies and alibis to get his killers off the street.

=== Season 18 (2016–2017) ===
| No. overall | No. in season | Title | Location | Original release date |
|---|---|---|---|---|
| 332 | 1 | "Deadly Premonition" | New Orleans, Louisiana | December 1, 2016 |
After a young woman has a deadly premonition, the homicide team discovers her killer may have killed before.
| 333 | 2 | "Taken for a Ride" | Atlanta, Georgia | December 8, 2016 |
A brash murder in front of an elementary school turns up a familiar name.
| 334 | 3 | "Killer Contact" | Tulsa, Oklahoma | December 15, 2016 |
When a young man is found shot to death in his van, the homicide team retraces his final hours and gets caught up in a web of lies.
| 335 | 4 | "Mr. New Orleans; No Shelter" | New Orleans, Louisiana / Minneapolis, Minnesota | December 22, 2016 |
Detectives work the murder of an infamous local criminal stabbed to death; a squabble amongst friends leaves a woman brutally murdered in a bus station.
| 336 | 5 | "Bad Romance; Out of Control" | Minneapolis, Minnesota / Tulsa, Oklahoma | December 29, 2016 |
When a young Somali girl is executed in bed, Sergeants Charlie Adams and Chris Thomsen uncover a secret relationship that may have turned deadly; a beloved son is shot to death when a house party spins out of control and Detective Ronnie Leatherman hits roadblocks in his search for a desperate and dangerous killer.
| 337 | 6 | "Murder on the Bluff" | Atlanta, Georgia | January 5, 2017 |
When a turf war leaves an elderly woman dead, the homicide team turns up the heat to prevent more bloodshed.
| 338 | 7 | "A Fighting Chance" | Tulsa, Oklahoma | January 12, 2017 |
When an argument at a local bar ends with a young social activist shot sixteen times, Detective Ronnie Leatherman searches for answers in a divided community.
| 339 | 8 | "Deadly Favor / Just Kids" | New Orleans, Louisiana / Atlanta, Georgia | January 19, 2017 |
An elderly man is shot dead outside his home; police work to identify the young man and woman caught on a store camera committing a murder in broad daylight.
| 340 | 9 | "Deadly Lies / Stay Down" | Tulsa, Oklahoma / Atlanta, Georgia | January 26, 2017 |
A police detective cuts through conflicting stories in the case of a man who was shot and run over by a car; a gunman opens fire outside a nightclub, killing one man and leaving another clinging to life.
| 341 | 10 | "The Other Wife" | Kansas City, Kansas | February 2, 2017 |
When a man is gunned down protecting his wife, detectives hope his ex-wife can reveal who may have wanted him killed.
| 342 | 11 | "Love Hate / A Soldier's Life" | Tulsa, Oklahoma / Atlanta, Georgia | February 27, 2017 |
A woman goes on the run after the murder of her boyfriend; an Army veteran is gunned down after helping a homeless man.
| 343 | 12 | "A Man's Game" | Atlanta, Georgia | March 2, 2017 |
A young man is shot and left to die in the bushes; a police detective's main clue in the case is a mysterious white town car.
| 344 | 13 | "Fatal Mistake" | Tulsa, Oklahoma | March 9, 2017 |
A night out leaves an innocent man dead; detectives follow up on solid leads that go nowhere, then discover a motive they never expected.
| 345 | 14 | "Bullets Have No Names" | Atlanta, Georgia | May 25, 2017 |
When a retired pre-school teacher is slain by a stray bullet, Atlanta detectives need a witness to break the code of silence.
| 346 | 15 | "Fatal Showdown / Deadly Text" | Tulsa, Oklahoma / New Orleans, Louisiana | June 1, 2017 |
A man is gunned down in broad daylight; an Army veteran is shot eight times in his own home after a text message lands in the hands of a killer.
| 347 | 16 | "Deadly Rap" | Atlanta, Georgia | June 8, 2017 |
Detectives uncover a vengeful motive while investigating a shootout in a rap studio that left two men dead.
| 348 | 17 | "Officer Down" | New Orleans, Louisiana | June 29, 2017 |
After one of their own is executed in cold blood, homicide detectives learn their suspect may have killed before.
| 349 | 18 | "Dangerous Business" | Minneapolis, Minnesota | July 6, 2017 |
A suburban teen is killed in a robbery gone bad, prompting a police detective to determine which of the victim’s friends may have double-crossed him.
| 350 | 19 | "Deadly Dispute / Heart to Heart" | Tulsa, Oklahoma / Atlanta, Georgia | July 13, 2017 |
A running street battle results in the death of a young father; a man is shot in the back when he defends his mother’s honor.
| 351 | 20 | "In the Line of Fire / Over the Edge" | New Orleans, Louisiana | July 20, 2017 |
A police detective must determine if the person who gunned down a teenager is a friend or a foe; the employees of an executed businessman may prove a motive for the crime.
| 352 | 21 | "House of Horrors / Final Sacrifice" | Tulsa, Oklahoma / Atlanta, Georgia | July 27, 2017 |
Detectives race to find the perpetrator of a vicious hammer attack that leaves two young men clinging to life; a selfless act performed by a man leads to his murder.
| 353 | 22 | "A Murder in Mobile" | Mobile, Alabama | August 3, 2017 |
Police detectives uncover a petty motive after a shooter guns down a homeless man on a sidewalk.

=== Season 19 (2017–2018) ===
| No. overall | No. in season | Title | Location | Original release date |
|---|---|---|---|---|
| 354 | 1 | "Honor Code" | Atlanta, Georgia | October 19, 2017 |
A decorated veteran and grandfather gets ambushed when he checks on a residential property.
| 355 | 2 | "Runner Runner" | Mobile, Alabama | October 26, 2017 |
A quick-money scam ends in a double murder; a rookie homicide detective takes the case personally.
| 356 | 3 | "Monster" | Tulsa, Oklahoma | November 30, 2017 |
A police detective tracks down a sadistic killer who murdered the brother of a man who stole his truck.
| 357 | 4 | "Dangerous Company" | Tulsa, Oklahoma | December 7, 2017 |
Police detectives track down a vicious killer who bound, robbed and murdered their 66-year-old landlord.
| 358 | 5 | "Endless Love; Out of Time" | Tulsa, Oklahoma / Kansas City, Kansas | December 14, 2017 |
A woman is beaten and stabbed to death in her home in an act of vengeance; a man is unable to get out of a dangerous business.
| 359 | 6 | "Trap House" | Tulsa, Oklahoma | December 21, 2017 |
When a man is murdered just before Christmas, his family helps detectives search for his killers.
| 360 | 7 | "Devil in Me; Trail of Blood" | Tulsa, Oklahoma/ Atlanta, Georgia | January 1, 2018 |
A man is shot and killed when a stranger sees an opportunity too good to pass up; an escalating argument ends with one man dead and the other in danger.
| 361 | 8 | "Cruel Summer" | New Orleans, Louisiana | January 4, 2018 |
Gunmen open fire on a porch, shooting four children and three adults; a police detective turns to the community for help in solving the case.
| 362 | 9 | "Rearview Killer; Point Blank" | Atlanta, Georgia / Tulsa, Oklahoma | January 11, 2018 |
A parking lot drug deal turns into a shootout that claims the lives of two Atlanta men; an execution outside a motel escalates into a double murder when the killer spots a witness to the crime.
| 363 | 10 | "Score to Settle; In Her Arms" | Atlanta, Georgia / Tulsa, Oklahoma | January 18, 2018 |
Detective John Brown races the clock when an innocent grandma is gunned down. Could teenagers be behind her tragic death?
| 364 | 11 | "The Girl Next Door" | Atlanta, Georgia | March 29, 2018 |
When a young man is shot from 235 feet away, Detective Darrin Smith discovers an escalating feud that threatens to tear apart a neighborhood.
| 365 | 12 | "Fallen Hero;The Last Deal" | Mobile, Alabama / Tulsa, Oklahoma | April 5, 2018 |
When a 90-year-old war hero is shot in the back, detectives discover his former neighbor may hold the key to what went down; a young man's future is cut short when a plan to make a quick buck goes horribly wrong.
| 366 | 13 | "Inside the Tape Special #4" | Minneapolis, Minnesota / Tulsa, Oklahoma | April 12, 2018 |
A late-night shooting leaves one man dead and another alive to help detectives identify the killer; a late-night party turns into a bloodbath; detectives must decide if a duo responsible for a carjacking spree also murdered a single father.
| 367 | 14 | "Inside the Tape Special #5" | New Orleans, Louisiana / Kansas City, Kansas | April 19, 2018 |
A man is robbed and shot multiple times on his payday; an eyewitness to a crime points out a potential suspect; a local prostitute may have information when a man is found shot dead in his car; a feud between neighbors gets out of control.
| 368 | 15 | "Inside the Tape Special #6" | Minneapolis, Minnesota | April 26, 2018 |
Surveillance cameras at a convenience store capture more than just a shooting; detectives need the help of the Somali community to help solve the murder of one of their own; a 19-year-old woman discovers an intruder in her home.
| 369 | 16 | "Inside the Tape Special #7" | New Orleans, Louisiana / Tulsa, Oklahoma / Mobile, Alabama | May 22, 2018 |
Detectives have doubts when a star witness identifies her boyfriend's killers; a detective tries to get a friend of two murdered men to change his ways; a man is randomly shot in front of his sister's house; a homeless man is brutally murdered.
| 370 | 17 | "Stolen Innocence" | Tulsa, Oklahoma | August 23, 2018 |
When a young mother and her friend are murdered in front of her children, detectives hope a suspicious vehicle will lead them to the killer.
| 371 | 18 | "Deadly Secrets;True Lies" | Tulsa, Oklahoma / Minneapolis, Minnesota | August 23, 2018 |
Detectives investigate the double murder of two family men, urging a witness to come clean; a young woman is found dead in a dumpster after she discovers the fate of her fiancé.
| 372 | 19 | "Bad Lick; Red Dawn" | Tulsa, Oklahoma / Atlanta, Georgia | August 30, 2018 |
After a generous man is murdered, Detective Egbert suspects he may have been a victim of his own kindness; a man is shot while driving down the street; Sgt. Walker questions youths who tried to break into the victim's house.
| 373 | 20 | "Last Hope; Truth and Consequences" | Atlanta, Georgia/ Tulsa, Oklahoma | August 30, 2018 |
A teenager's life is cut short over a neighborhood beef; a young woman goes missing, and her family fears she was murdered.
| 374 | 21 | "Standing Ground" | Tulsa, Oklahoma | September 6, 2018 |
A high school football player is gunned down when his friends make a dangerous decision; detectives must separate witnesses from suspects to find out who fired the fatal bullet.
| 375 | 22 | "End of The Road" | Tulsa, Oklahoma | September 13, 2018 |
An unsolved case comes to life when new evidence sheds light on a dead man's friend.
| 376 | 23 | "Lost Boys" | Tulsa, Oklahoma | September 13, 2018 |
An innocent grandmother is gunned down steps from her front door; Detective John Brown discovers that her killers may be 14-year-old boys.
| 377 | 24 | "Predator" | Harris County, Texas | October 4, 2018 |
A woman is found bound by the side of the road; as Sgt. James Dousay works the case, he discovers that he may be looking for a serial killer.
| 378 | 25 | "For A Friend;The Last Gamble" | Atlanta, Georgia/ Tulsa, Oklahoma | October 11, 2018 |
A teenager is killed when he steps in front of a gunman to save his friend; a man is shot dead and left in a church parking lot when he tries to sell a stolen car.
| 379 | 26 | "Knock at The Door; Brave One" | Tulsa, Oklahoma/ Mobile, Alabama | October 18, 2018 |
A man is murdered in front of his fiancée when death comes knocking at their door; a beloved man is gunned down while protecting his friends from a shooter's rage.
| 380 | 27 | "Unspeakable Part 1" | Tulsa, Oklahoma | October 25, 2018 |
A man gunned down inside an apartment sets off a chain of events unlike anything Homicide has ever seen.
| 381 | 28 | "Unspeakable Part 2" | Tulsa, Oklahoma | October 25, 2018 |
As Detective Jason White continues to investigate Courtney Palmer's disappearance, the missing persons case turns into a detective's worst nightmare.

=== Season 20 (2019) ===
| No. overall | No. in season | Title | Location | Original release date |
|---|---|---|---|---|
| 382 | 1 | "Spree Killer" | Tulsa, Oklahoma | January 10, 2019 |
When a potential spree killer targets the most vulnerable, Detective Max Ryden must stop the murderer before he kills again.
| 383 | 2 | "The Grudge" | Mobile, Alabama | January 17, 2019 |
A man who turned his life around is gunned down in cold blood. Detectives need to know if his troubled past came back to haunt him.
| 384 | 3 | "A Bad Run-In; Inferno" | Tulsa, Oklahoma / Atlanta, Georgia | January 24, 2019 |
A barrage of gunfire kills a man while he is sitting in his car with his two-year-old daughter in the back seat; an elderly man is burned alive in a building fire suspected to be arson.
| 385 | 4 | "Last Rap" | Tulsa, Oklahoma | January 31, 2019 |
When a young man is found executed in the street and a second victim is shot nearby, detectives scramble to track down the dangerous gunman before he kills again.
| 386 | 5 | "Flashing Colors" | Gwinnett County, Georgia | February 7, 2019 |
A teenager is gunned down outside a nightclub when he winds up at the center of a gang feud.
| 387 | 6 | "Buried Secrets" | Mobile, Alabama | February 14, 2019 |
A 68-year-old woman goes missing after checking into a casino where she had lost millions.
| 388 | 7 | "The Visitor" | Atlanta, Georgia | February 21, 2019 |
After his mother reports him missing, an Atlanta man is found dead, naked and shot twice in his bedroom.
| 389 | 8 | "Rise Up; Somebody's Friend" | Atlanta, Georgia | February 21, 2019 |
A woman is found dead in a garbage can and a young man is ambushed by neighborhood bullies.
| 390 | 9 | "Family First" | Tulsa, Oklahoma | February 28, 2019 |
When a young man disappears, detectives must break through a family's code of silence to find him.
| 391 | 10 | "After Hours; The Cutting Edge" | Atlanta, Georgia/ Gwinnett County, Georgia | February 28, 2019 |
A stranger guns down a new father in a parking lot; a man is stabbed more than 20 times when someone he trusts turns against him.
| 392 | 11 | "The Deadliest Sin; Bloodlines" | Mobile, Alabama / Tulsa, Oklahoma | March 7, 2019 |
The murder of a 19-year-old becomes personal when the team learns that the victim is Detective Jermaine Rogers' cousin; a 31-year-old mother is gunned down in front of her home by an unlikely suspect.
| 393 | 12 | "A Killer Fight; Do the Right Thing" | Mobile, Alabama / Tulsa, Oklahoma | March 7, 2019 |
A street fight escalates to a shooting that leaves a man dead in his front yard; a drive-by shooting stemming from a gang feud claims the life of a 16-year-old girl, while her boyfriend clings to life.
| 394 | 13 | "The Brotherhood; Lit Up" | Mobile, Alabama / Tulsa, Oklahoma | April 11, 2019 |
A young man is murdered at his girlfriend's house when drive-by shooters unload several dozen rounds at the home; a Jeep is found crashed along the highway with a man sitting inside, shot dead.
| 395 | 14 | "Young Guns" | Tulsa, Oklahoma | April 18, 2019 |
When an innocent bystander protecting a young woman is gunned down, detectives scramble to learn who fired the fatal shots before anyone else gets hurt.
| 396 | 15 | "Tracked" | Gwinnett County, Georgia | April 25, 2019 |
When a father of three is executed on his front porch, Homicide discovers that those closest to him are hiding a dark secret.
| 397 | 16 | "Random Acts; Blunt Force" | Tulsa, Oklahoma / Mobile, Alabama | May 9, 2019 |
A random shooter reveals startling new information on a cold case; a 70-year-old Vietnam vet is found beaten to death in his home, where detectives discover cryptic threatening letters.
| 398 | 17 | "Crossroads" | Tulsa, Oklahoma | May 16, 2019 |
Detectives suspect a random roadside encounter when they find an unidentified cyclist gunned down in the middle of an intersection outside the airport.

=== Season 21 (2020–2021) ===
| No. overall | No. in season | Title | Location | Original release date |
|---|---|---|---|---|
| 399 | 1 | "Chain of Death" | Tulsa, Oklahoma | January 1, 2020 |
A young mother and her best friend are gunned down in broad daylight, setting off a chain of events that Homicide never could have imagined.
| 400 | 2 | "Taken" | Atlanta, Georgia | January 2, 2020 |
When a young man and his pregnant fiancée are executed after a failed ransom attempt, Homicide will stop at nothing to identify the elusive suspect.
| 401 | 3 | "Down a Dark Hallway" | Tulsa, Oklahoma | January 2, 2020 |
Detectives struggle to find a lead when a beloved grandfather is gunned down in his home.
| 402 | 4 | "Tricked; Rogue Gun" | Mobile, Alabama / Gwinnett County, Georgia | January 9, 2020 |
A 21-year-old woman is shot dead in her hotel room by a mysterious visitor; when a 42-year-old music producer is found riddled with bullets in his apartment, clues point toward a madman on a shooting spree.
| 403 | 5 | "Dead Stop; Uninvited" | Atlanta, Georgia / Tulsa, Oklahoma | January 16, 2020 |
When a young father is found dead in his home by his girlfriend, detectives track down the killer and find things are not as they appear; a teenager is fatally shot, sending police on a desperate search for the motive.
| 404 | 6 | "The Invader" | Tulsa, Oklahoma | January 23, 2020 |
A father of three is gunned down in front of his family during a deadly crime spree; detectives race to track down his killer before anyone else gets hurt.
| 405 | 7 | "Bridge of Lies" | Tulsa, Oklahoma | January 30, 2020 |
A homeless man is beaten and stabbed to death, leading detectives to witnesses that live under the bridge where he was discovered.
| 406 | 8 | "Devil’s Trail" | Tulsa, Oklahoma | February 6, 2020 |
Detectives have little to go on when they find the naked body of an unknown homeless woman who was raped, strangled to death and thrown into a dumpster.
| 407 | 9 | "The Breakup; No Good Deed" | Mobile, Alabama / Atlanta, Georgia | February 13, 2020 |
A young woman is found dead behind an abandoned building and detectives need her boyfriend to help solve the case; a young father's murder case sends detectives to the Pocono Mountains in search of his killers.
| 408 | 10 | "Jealous Heart; The Jump" | Mobile, Alabama / Atlanta, Georgia | February 20, 2020 |
A beloved mother of four is killed when she can't escape her past; a detective on his first crime scene must find out why two young friends were gunned down in broad daylight.
| 409 | 11 | "Fateful Date" | Tulsa, Oklahoma | February 20, 2020 |
When a shy mechanic is found shot dead outside a notorious apartment complex far from home, Detective Max Ryden needs to discover what brought him there.
| 410 | 12 | "Triggered" | Tulsa, Oklahoma | February 27, 2020 |
Detective Ronnie Leatherman returns to investigate the death of a man who crashed his car in a shopping center.
| 411 | 13 | "Brothers Down" | Tulsa, Oklahoma | March 5, 2020 |
Two brothers are shot down after checking on their night cleaning crew; detectives struggle to find a motive before the killer strikes again.
| 412 | 14 | "Carnage in the Streets" | Mobile, Alabama | March 12, 2020 |
Two young men are gunned down within the space of 12 hours, and clues point to a feud between rival cliques.
| 413 | 15 | "Late Night Ambush; Fire & Fury" | Tulsa, Oklahoma / Mobile, Alabama | March 19, 2020 |
A father is gunned down in a parking lot by a killer lying in wait; an elderly man dies from a suspicious fire in his apartment.
| 414 | 16 | "Life Interrupted; Lucifer" | Atlanta, Georgia / Tulsa, Oklahoma | March 26, 2020 |
A young man comes home for lunch and winds up murdered when he catches a brazen thief in the act; an ongoing feud between two gang members leads to a fateful encounter.
| 415 | 17 | "Jackpot" | Tulsa, Oklahoma | April 2, 2020 |
When a man is found shot dead in his driveway, an abandoned truck leads Homicide to several potential suspects, but not everything is as it seems.
| 416 | 18 | "Cruel Intentions" | Mobile, Alabama | April 9, 2020 |
Detectives investigate the murder of a young mother of two and unravel the deadly plot that took her life.
| 417 | 19 | "Gangland" | Atlanta, Georgia | April 16, 2020 |
A young man is gunned down at a troubled apartment complex that comes under federal investigation after a rap video goes viral.
| 418 | 20 | "Deadly Triangle" | Gwinnett County, Georgia | April 21, 2020 |
A man is gunned down in the early morning on his front lawn, the engine of his truck still running behind him; Detective James Lawson unravels a tangled web of jealousy and betrayal in order to find his killer.
| 419 | 21 | "The Standoff" | Tulsa, Oklahoma | April 23, 2020 |
Homicide responds when a father of three is gunned down at his job by suspects who end up in a standoff with police.
| 420 | 22 | "Snatched" | Tulsa, Oklahoma | April 28, 2020 |
When a homeless man is killed after getting run over in a parking lot, detectives work to track down the elusive driver.
| 421 | 23 | "Child's Play; Bad Intentions" | Tulsa, Oklahoma / Mobile, Alabama | April 30, 2020 |
A teenager is shot dead and detectives must uncover the truth among his roommates' stories; a young man's murder sets off a retaliatory shooting.
| 422 | 24 | "Among Friends" | Mobile, Alabama | July 16, 2020 |
A young man is shot dead in front of his mother's house; detectives look to his friends and family to find his killer.
| 423 | 25 | "Shooting Blind; Brothers in Arms" | Tulsa, Oklahoma / Mobile, Alabama | July 23, 2020 |
In Tulsa, Oklahoma., detectives question whether a young woman's death was a tragic mistake or murder; in Mobile, Alabama., the murder of a young father tests the bond between brothers.
| 424 | 26 | "Night of Lies" | Mobile, Alabama | July 30, 2020 |
In Mobile, Alabama, the search for justice in the shooting death of a young men in a crowded parking lot has unfortunate consequences.
| 425 | 27 | "Point of No Return" | Mobile, Alabama | August 6, 2020 |
When two friends are found executed in a car on a dark dead-end street, the investigators leads detectives to an unlikely suspect.
| 426 | 28 | "Old Flame; Bad Behavior" | Tulsa, Oklahoma / Gwinnett County, Georgia | August 13, 2020 |
When a late-night shootout leaves a young man dead in Tulsa, Okla., the investigation leads to a woman from his past; when a Marine veteran is shot, detectives must determine if it is self-defense or not.
| 427 | 29 | "Escape Plan; Path of Terror" | Gwinnett County, Georgia / Tulsa, Oklahoma | August 20, 2020 |
A mother is stabbed to death and detectives search for her missing son, who might be the only witness; Tulsa detectives look for a link between the murders of pregnant woman and a young man at the same complex.
| 428 | 30 | "Skipping School; Gamer" | Atlanta, Georgia / Tulsa, Oklahoma | August 27, 2020 |
In Atlanta, a 23-year-old man is shot dead in front of his friends after a bad deal; when a 15-year-old high school student is found on the stairs of an apartment filled with kids, witnesses need to tell the truth.
| 429 | 31 | "Cover Story" | Tulsa, Oklahoma | November 5, 2020 |
A man in Tulsa calls 911 claiming his girlfriend shot and killed herself, but detectives discover evidence suggesting foul play.
| 430 | 32 | "Death In Desire" | New Orleans, Louisiana | November 12, 2020 |
In New Orleans, detectives make a gruesome discovery inside a car that was set on fire; Det. Ryan Vaught hopes the last person who spoke to the victim can lead him to the killer.
| 431 | 33 | "Tell No Tales; Unfair Fight" | Tulsa, Oklahoma / New Orleans, Louisiana | November 19, 2020 |
In Tulsa, Oklahoma, a father of two is gunned down when an attempt to stand up for his cousin backfires; when an unidentified woman found shot and burned resembles a suspect in a recent home invasion, New Orleans detectives suspect a connection.
| 432 | 34 | "Truly Lost" | Gwinnett County, Georgia | January 7, 2021 |
When two young men are shot and killed in a car, Gwinnett County Homicide turns to the survivors to learn the truth about what led to the shooting.
| 433 | 35 | "The Code" | Tulsa, Oklahoma | January 14, 2021 |
Tulsa detectives investigate the Neighborhood Crips to solve the murder of a young man trying to leave the gang.
| 434 | 36 | "What About Me; Last Round" | Tulsa, Oklahoma / Mobile, Alabama | January 21, 2021 |
In Tulsa, a mother of five is killed after a roadside argument spins out of control; in Mobile, a security guard tries to keep the peace and ends up brutally murdered.
| 435 | 37 | "Death in the Family; Love Lost" | Tulsa, Oklahoma / Mobile, Alabama | February 4, 2021 |
In Tulsa, a woman is found dumped in a hospital parking lot after someone she trusts crosses the line; Then, in Mobile, a jealous rage leaves a father of nine dead and threatens to tear his family apart.
| 436 | 38 | "Easy Mark" | Tulsa, Oklahoma | February 11, 2021 |
In Tulsa, when detectives investigate the murder of a man with a troubled past, they uncover a sinister plot.
| 437 | 39 | "For Love and Honor; The Dark Side of Love" | Tulsa, Oklahoma | February 18, 2021 |
In Tulsa, Okla., a young man stands up for his girlfriend and pays the ultimate price; a man is gunned down in front of his girlfriend after someone from her past goes over the edge.
| 438 | 40 | "Inside the Tape Special #9" | Kansas City, Kansas / Atlanta, Georgia | February 25, 2021 |
In KCK, when a dead body is discovered on a bridge, catching the killer depends on finding the crime scene. In Atlanta, surveillance footage shows a man carrying a box moments before he is shot.
| 439 | 41 | "Vengeance; Paid in Full" | Tulsa, Oklahoma / Mobile, Alabama | March 11, 2021 |
In Tulsa, a quadruple shooting leaves two people dead as a vigilante seeks payback for his house being targeted in a drive-by shooting; in Mobile, a man is shot in front of his fiance as a dispute over money takes a deadly turn.
| 440 | 42 | "Close to Home" | Tulsa, Oklahoma | March 18, 2021 |
In Tulsa, Okla., a father of three is gunned down after an argument, and the instincts of veteran detective Jason White are put to the test.
| 441 | 43 | "The Devil You Know" | Mobile, Alabama | March 25, 2021 |
Mobile Homicide track a killer who shot a man in his home; but they learn not everything is what it seems.
| 442 | 44 | "Thick as Thieves" | Mobile, Alabama | April 1, 2021 |
In Mobile, Detective Jermaine Rogers hunts for multiple perpetrators of a home invasion that left two dead.
| 443 | 45 | "End Game" | Mobile, Alabama | April 8, 2021 |
In Mobile, a professor of economics is found shot dead outside his bedroom door when he doesn't show up for class.
| 444 | 46 | "Bad Cinderella" | Tulsa, Oklahoma | April 15, 2021 |
A father of four is gunned down while defending his girlfriend during a brutal home invasion.
| 445 | 47 | "The Abnormals" | Mobile, Alabama | April 22, 2021 |
In Mobile, the homicide team takes on a missing persons case when new evidence points to foul play.
| 446 | 48 | "Spellbound" | Atlanta, Georgia | May 6, 2021 |
In Atlanta, Detective Darrin Smith investigates the murder of a college student.
| 447 | 49 | "School’s Out" | Mobile, Alabama | May 13, 2021 |
A young man is killed walking home.
| 448 | 50 | "Crossfire Hurricane" | Tulsa, Oklahoma | May 20, 2021 |
After two people are gunned down in a crowded park, detectives must rely on the public to reveal what sparked the deadly shootout.
| 449 | 51 | "Road Rage" | Mobile, Alabama | May 27, 2021 |
When a father of three is gunned down after confronting a hit-and-run driver, Mobile detectives struggle to find clues that will lead them to his killer.
| 450 | 52 | "Bleeding Heart" | Tulsa, Oklahoma | August 15, 2021 |
In Tulsa, a homeless woman and her boyfriend are taken in by a friend; when he ends up dead, they have to choose between saving themselves and doing the right thing.
| 451 | 53 | "Unforgotten: Crystal" | Tulsa, Oklahoma | August 19, 2021 |
Tulsa Homicide tackles its most difficult unsolved case, spanning multiple suspects and several years.
| 452 | 54 | "Out of the Darkness" | Tulsa, Oklahoma | August 26, 2021 |
Tulsa Homicide investigates two cases linked by domestic violence.

=== Season 22 (2021–2022) ===
| No. overall | No. in season | Title | Location | Original release date |
|---|---|---|---|---|
| 453 | 1 | "Masked in Mobile" | Mobile, Alabama | October 21, 2021 |
The cold-blooded shooting of a man outside his apartment is caught on video, but detectives must work through the night to identify his masked attacker.
| 454 | 2 | "Along Came a Killer" | Gwinnett County, Georgia | October 21, 2021 |
When three people are gunned down in a quiet neighborhood, Gwinnett County police struggle to find a connection between the victims.
| 455 | 3 | "A Beautiful Life" | Tulsa, Oklahoma | October 28, 2021 |
A young Tulsa father is shot several times in his driveway after putting his 1-year-old daughter to bed; Detective Jason White hopes a pill bottle found on the scene will help lead to the killer.
| 456 | 4 | "Unforgotten: Darrin" | Tulsa, Oklahoma | November 4, 2021 |
A teenager is found murdered and dumped in a field in Tulsa, Oklahoma; when the leads run dry, detectives need help to get justice for the victim's family.
| 457 | 5 | "Old Habits" | Tulsa, Oklahoma | November 11, 2021 |
Old habits die hard when a young father gets out of prison and is drawn back into his old life; after he's shot dead, Tulsa, Oklahoma, homicide must sort through a web of lies to find out who killed him.
| 458 | 6 | "Through Death's Door" | Gwinnett County, Georgia | November 18, 2021 |
Gwinnett County detectives chase down a bullet-ridden Toyota Camry to find who may have killed a beloved young man.
| 459 | 7 | "Unforgotten: Ray & Blu" | Mobile, Alabama | December 2, 2021 |
In Mobile, when two beloved men from the Mobile Terrace neighborhood are gunned down, detectives need the community's help to get justice for their families.
| 460 | 8 | "The Break" | Mobile, Alabama | December 9, 2021 |
In a crowded Mobile bar, surveillance video captures the shocking murder of a man after a game of pool.
| 461 | 9 | "The Dark Trail" | Tulsa, Oklahoma | December 16, 2021 |
In Tulsa, a homeless man is ambushed by two men on a dark trail, and his wife may hold the key to finding the killers.
| 462 | 10 | "Friends and Enemies" | Tulsa, Oklahoma | January 6, 2022 |
In Tulsa, three people are executed in their ransacked home, and the woman who found them may hold the key to finding the killer.
| 463 | 11 | "Final Celebration" | Mobile, Alabama | January 13, 2022 |
In Mobile, a father of four is gunned down in a strip club when a chance encounter turns deadly.
| 464 | 12 | "One Good Deed" | Tulsa, Oklahoma | January 20, 2022 |
When a hard-working construction worker is brutally murdered on payday, Tulsa detectives chase an unlikely suspect: the victim's best friend.
| 465 | 13 | "Chat Trap" | Gwinnnett County, Georgia | January 27, 2022 |
When a 15-year-old boy is murdered after getting in over his head, detectives hope a Snapchat message can lead them to his killer.
| 466 | 14 | "Killed by Command" | Tulsa, Oklahoma | March 10, 2022 |
When a love triangle turns deadly, a killer enlists an unusual murder weapon.
| 467 | 15 | "Friends With Guns; All in the Family" | Tulsa, Oklahoma / Mobile, Alabama | March 17, 2022 |
In Tulsa, a friendly gathering takes a fatal turn when three people are shot and a teenager is killed; in Mobile, a plan to settle a dispute backfires when a man is gunned down at a family member's house.
| 468 | 16 | "Green-Eyed Monster" | Gwinnett County, Georgia | May 19, 2022 |
In Gwinnett County, two brothers are murdered in their sleep; detectives suspect they were betrayed by someone they knew.
| 469 | 17 | "Freestyling" | Tulsa, Oklahoma | July 7, 2022 |
When a man is found shot and dumped in the road, detectives learn how his struggle to overcome obstacles left him headed for a collision with someone on the edge.
| 470 | 18 | "Lips are Sealed" | Tulsa, Oklahoma | August 11, 2022 |
When a young father goes out partying and ends up murdered at a club, everyone knows what happened…but no one is talking.
| 471 | 19 | "Street Life" | Mobile, Alabama | August 18, 2022 |
A fateful choice tragically ends the life of an up-and-coming rapper.
| 472 | 20 | "Walk in the Park" | Gwinnett County, Georgia | August 20, 2022 |
When a man is gunned down while walking his dogs in a quiet park, surveillance video leads detectives to an unlikely suspect.
| 473 | 21 | "A Day Like This" | Mobile, Alabama | August 25, 2022 |
In Mobile, one teenager is killed, and another's life is forever changed when a single decision turns fatal.
| 474 | 22 | "Raw Deal" | Gwinnett County, Georgia | September 1, 2022 |
When hip hop artist Chucky Trill is gunned down on a highway after leaving a nightclub, Gwinnett County Homicide must retrace his steps to find the killer.
| 475 | 23 | "Backslide" | Tulsa, Oklahoma | September 8, 2022 |
When a father of two is shot dead while driving, detectives must retrace his steps to figure out who killed him.

=== Season 23 (2022–2023) ===
| No. overall | No. in season | Title | Location | Original release date |
|---|---|---|---|---|
| 476 | 1 | "Unforgotten: Mothers and Sons" | Mobile, Alabama | November 3, 2022 |
Two murders occurring within hours of each other at the same apartment complex leave Mobile Homicide scrambling to find the culprits.
| 477 | 2 | "Money Move" | Gwinnett County, Georgia | November 10, 2022 |
Five young lives are ruined when a plan to score some easy money goes horribly wrong.
| 478 | 3 | "Deadly Bluff" | Tulsa, Oklahoma | November 17, 2022 |
In Tulsa, one man is killed, and another is injured when a dispute over stolen marijuana plants turns deadly.
| 479 | 4 | "Tripped Out" | Mobile, Alabama | December 1, 2022 |
When a teenager is found shot and dumped in the street, detectives struggle to figure out who he is and where he was killed.
| 480 | 5 | "House Party" | Gwinnett County, Georgia | December 8, 2022 |
In Gwinnett County, a young man is caught in the crossfire when his twenty-first birthday spins out of control.
| 481 | 6 | "Deadly Pickup" | Gwinnett County, Georgia | January 12, 2023 |
When a man is found shot to death in the back of his truck, detectives hope a dating app is the key to finding his killer.
| 482 | 7 | "Into Thin Air; Love And Lies" | Atlanta, Georgia / Tulsa, Oklahoma | January 19, 2023 |
In Atlanta, a young man is missing and presumed dead after a mysterious turn of events. In Tulsa, a mother-to-be shields a potential killer.
| 483 | 8 | "Murder Strikes at Midnight" | Tulsa, Oklahoma | March 9, 2023 |
Tulsa detectives head to Texas to chase down two suspects after they kill a young father of two.
| 484 | 9 | "Out of Options; The Reunion" | Tulsa, Oklahoma / Gwinnett County, Georgia | March 16, 2023 |
In Tulsa, Okla., Detective White needs a former student to tell the truth about a shooting at an apartment complex. In Gwinnett, Ga., a man is shot in front of his friend as a robbery takes a deadly turn.
| 485 | 10 | "The Woman in the Dark" | Gwinnett County, Georgia | March 23, 2023 |
Two detectives, a veteran and a rookie, untangle a web of lies as they work to solve a young woman’s mysterious death.
| 486 | 11 | "Dark Places" | Mobile, Alabama | March 30, 2023 |
In Mobile, Ala., when a homeless woman is found executed in an alley and a father of five is shot dead in a desolate area, detectives rely on clues from one case to help solve the other.
| 487 | 12 | "Bad Influence/Vicious Circle" | Atlanta, Georgia | April 27, 2023 |
In Atlanta, a young man is killed in an apartment when a scheme to make easy money goes wrong; a beloved mother is murdered in a drive-by shooting leading St. Louis detectives to a neighborhood turf war.
| 488 | 13 | "Back Street" | Tusla, Oklahoma | June 8, 2023 |
When a man is shot on the side of the road, clues lead Detective Jason White to an ongoing crime spree, in his 100th case for Tulsa Homicide.
| 489 | 14 | "Sliders" | Gwinnett County, Georgia | June 15, 2023 |
In Gwinnett County, a beloved special education teacher is gunned down in broad daylight when the suspects' plan to score some easy money spins out of control.
| 490 | 15 | "One Wrong Move" | Mobile, Alabama | June 22, 2023 |
Desperate to stop the senseless shootings in her community, Detective "KeeKee" Taylor must find out why the latest teen victim was wearing a ski mask when he was killed.
| 491 | 16 | "Killer of a Kind Heart/Dead Man's Hand" | Mobile, AL | June 29, 2023 |
A man living at an extended-stay hotel is shot dead in his room after a night of gambling with friends turns into more than anyone bargained for. In Mobile, a young woman helps a friend in need and pays the ultimate price.
| 492 | 17 | "Inside the Tape Special #10" | New Orleans, Louisiana / St. Louis, Missouri / Atlanta, Georgia / Tulsa, Oklahoma | August 17, 2023 |
In New Orleans, a 17-year-old high school student is shot over a gaming controller on his way to school. In St. Louis, a woman is murdered in broad daylight, and the main suspect is found nude walking down the street. In Atlanta, when surveillance footage shows a man carrying a box moments before he is shot, Detective Tracy Casey must determine if the box’s contents hold the key to determining a motive. In Tulsa, detectives must decide if a duo responsible for an all-night car-jacking spree ended with the gruesome murder of a single father.

=== Season 24 (2024) ===
| No. overall | No. in season | Title | Location | Original release date |
|---|---|---|---|---|
| 501 | 1 | "Killer Rage & A Killer at the Door" | Tulsa, Oklahoma | January 4, 2024 |
Tulsa police discover a woman fatally beaten during a welfare check, while a son witnesses his father's murder while renovating a house.
| 502 | 2 | "Meet Up for Murder" | TBA | January 11, 2024 |
When a man is lured into a deadly trap, detectives must turn the tables on the suspects, before they strike again.
| 503 | 3 | "No Way Home" | Gwinnett County, Georgia | January 18, 2024 |
When a young soccer player is shot dead and dumped on a Gwinnett County street, Corporal Ryan Jorstad hopes retracing the man's steps will lead him to the killer.
| 504 | 4 | "Think Twice" | Mobile, Alabama | January 25, 2024 |
In Mobile, a father of four is found dead inside a car after a mysterious crash, and detectives discover that his death was no accident.
| 505 | 5 | "On Camera & No Road Home" | Mobile AL & Gwinette County, GA | February 1, 2024 |
In Mobile, a brazen gunman shoots another man in front of gas station security cameras, and in Gwinnett County, detectives race to identify a woman shot on the side of the road and track down her killer.
| 506 | 6 | "Shot Caller" | Tulsa, Oklahoma | February 8, 2024 |
When a robbery ends in bloodshed, Detective Jeff Gatwood discovers the reach of a Tulsa gang extends beyond prison walls.
| 507 | 7 | "Inside The Tape Special #13" | Various | February 15, 2024 |
Detectives across Tulsa, New Orleans, and Mobile unravel heinous crimes, aiming to deliver justice for ravaged families and victims.
| 508 | 8 | "Inside The Tape Special #14" | TBA | February 22, 2024 |
In Tulsa, a late night party turns into a blood bath, but a Facebook video may help Detective John Brown dispute a suspect's claims that he wasn't there; in New Orleans, a man is robbed and shot multiple times on his payday.
| 509 | 9 | "Death at the Door" | TBA | April 4, 2024 |
After an argument in his home, a man answers a knock at his front door and is suddenly shot and killed.
| 510 | 10 | "Can't Let Go" | Gwinett County, Georgia | April 11, 2024 |
When a young businesswoman is shot dead at a car dealership, Gwinnett County detectives need to know if her associate holds the key to finding her killer.
