= Jinx (chimpanzee) =

Congolese-born American chimpanzee and ice skater

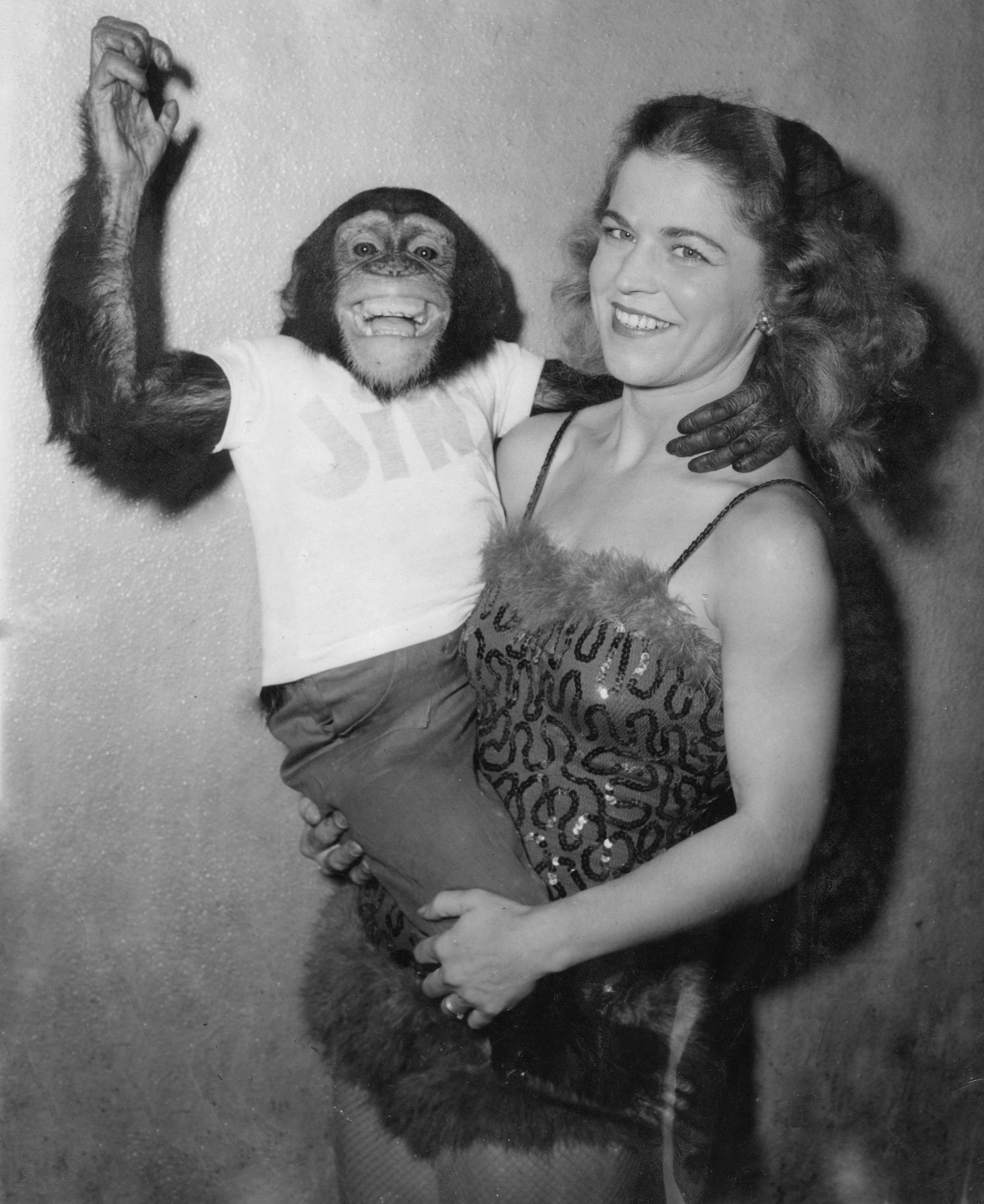
- Jinx and Darlene in 1959
- Species: chimpanzee
- Born: 1953; Léopoldville, Congo
- Died: 19??
- Known for: ice skating duo "Darlene and Jinx"
- Owner: Darlene Sellek

Jinx (born 1953-19??) was a chimpanzee who performed as part of the ice skating duo "Darlene and Jinx" with Darlene Sellek, his owner and trainer.

== Early life ==
Jinx, a member of the Pan troglodytes species, was born in late 1953 near Léopoldville, the capital of Belgian Congo. Jinx was purchased for $600 (f.o.b. Africa) from a Miami pet shop when he was 2 months old. “We had no idea of going into show business. We just wanted a pet,” claimed Darlene Sellek in an interview during one of the act's Ice Capades appearances in 1957.

== Performing career ==
Jinx and Darlene first appeared as an act at “The Homecoming” in Dekalb, Illinois, in August 1954, when Jinx was 10 months old. Jinx showed off his ability to walk a tightrope upside down and blindfolded. 4 months later, the act – billed as “Darlene and Jinx” – performed at the Chase Hotel in St. Louis, where the pair began a significant relationship with the major American circus impresario and director Al Dobritch.

In late January, Darlene started to train Jinx to ice skate, with the help of Baptist Schreiber, who is better known for his training of elephants. A few other show-business chimpanzees in the world were known to roller skate, but Jinx was the first to skate on ice. He first appeared on ice skates in the “Hollywood Ice Review” at Chicago Stadium in February, 1955, with the World and Olympic Ice Skating Champion Gundi Busch.

The relationship with Al Dobritch provided a number of bookings at various Shriner Circuses around the USA over the next few years, the first of which was the Zuhrah Shriner Circus in Minneapolis, at the end of February, 1955. The spring of 1955 found Darlene and Jinx in New Orleans at Pontchartrain Beach, working alongside Runyon and Edwards, and “Daddy Longlegs”, the man with the longest legs in the world.

By June, 1955, Al Dobritch had negotiated a television contract for the act; Darlene and Jinx had signed a 3-year contract with the Super Circus television show, produced in Chicago for station WBKB, “Chicago’s Family Station”. While with Super Circus, Jinx worked with the children's television pioneer Claude Kirchner and the ever popular Mary Hartline. Darlene and Jinx were forced to leave the show after only 5 months when the production moved from Chicago to New York in November, 1955.

Jinx visited New York for the first time in late 1955 when Darlene appeared on the What’s My Line? television game show (Game 2, Season 7, Episode 282), hosted by John Daly. During that visit, Jinx was inducted into the American Airlines “Sky Cradle Club” for the flight from New York to Chicago in November, 1955.

In November, 1955, Jinx began regular appearances with Ned Locke on the Captain Hartz and His Pets television show produced in Chicago for television station WMAQ, sponsored by the Hartz Mountain Corporation pet care company. (Jinx first appeared with Ned Locke as his WMAQ radio disc jockey assistant – the world's first chimpanzee radio personality.)

From the end on 1955 through mid-1956, Darlene and Jinx appeared at a number of Shriners Circuses across the US, including

- the Rizpah Shrine Circus in Madisonville, Kentucky,
- the Al Chymia Shrine Circus in Memphis, Tennessee
- the Arabia Temple Shrine Circus in Houston, Texas,
- the Shrine Circus in Topeka, Kansas, and
- the Hamid Morton Shrine Circus at Hunt Armory in Bloomsbury, Pennsylvania.

In July, 1956, Darlene and Jinx appeared at Belmont Park, Montreal in Quebec. This was followed in August at the Canadian National Exhibition (CNE) where they appeared with the television cowboy star Gene Autry, and then in September at the 4th annual Sudbury Rotary Exhibition in Sudbury, Ontario.

New Year, 1957, found Darlene and Jinx at Jack Valentine's Supper Club Restaurant in Ft. Lauderdale for a 3-month engagement with Jack Valentine's Ice Show. Here he performed with the great figure skater Jack Paul, who is quoted saying “Jinx outdoes me in figure work”.

In March 1957, the duo appeared on the Jackie Gleason Show “Cavalcade of Circuses”. In April, Darlene and Jinx made their first appearance in the Ice Capades at Chicago Stadium. In July, they appeared in Las Vegas at The Sands Cirque Room and Hotel El Cortez “Rhythm On Ice Revue”.

Back in Chicago in January, 1958, Darlene and Jinx filled in for “The Three Adaros” at the American Electroplaters Society 46th Educational Session and Banquet and performed an act called “Hi Jinx” in the Merriel Abbott Ice Revue at Chicago Hilton.

Darlene and Jinx appeared on America's most popular television variety program of the era, The Ed Sullivan Show “John Harris’s Ice Capades Of 1958”, broadcast on CBS television from Madison Square Garden in New York City on Sunday, 7 September 1958.

== Retirement ==
As Jinx aged, he began to become less controllable. At a Christmas Show in New York in 1960, he exhibited greater aggression toward his young audience.

Jinx's 1966 appearance in “Jamboree On Ice” at Indian Rocks Beach Palm Garden Restaurant, St. Petersburg, Florida, marked the end of his performing career. He retired in 1967 to the St. Louis Zoo.

== Co-stars ==
- Gene Autry
- Professor Backwards
- Gundi Busch
- Leo Carrillo
- Jill Corey
- John Daly
- Al Dobritch
- Lola Dobritch
- Jack Entratter
- Georgia Gibbs
- Great Wallendas
- Mary Hartline
- Peter Lind Hayes
- Mary Healy
- Miss Ohio Joan Hyldoft
- Dennis James
- Emmett Kelly
- Claude Kirchner
- Ned Locke
- Miller & Woodcock Elephants
- Garry Moore
- Jane Morgan
- Hugh O'Brian
- Joe Pasternak
- Johnnie Ray
- Duncan Renaldo
- Bob Reynolds
- Sharon Kay Ritchie
- Adrian Swan
- Sophie Tucker

== Performances ==
Date	Location	Venue	Event
12 Aug 1954	Dekalb, IL		The Homecoming
26 Dec 1954	St Louis	Chase Hotel	
01 Feb 1955	Chicago	Chicago Stadium	Hollywood Ice Revue
28 Feb 1955	Minneapolis	Minneapolis Auditorium	Zuhrah Shrine Circus
01 Apr 1955	New Orleans	Pontchartrain Beach	
02 Jul 1955	Chicago		Super Circus TV Show
31 Jul 1955	Chicago		Super Circus TV Show
01 Oct 1955	Madisonville, KY	Municipal Baseball Park	Rizpah Temple Shrine Circus
30 Oct 1955			Garry Moore Show "Zoo Parade"
11 Nov 1955	Houston	Sam Houston Coliseum	Arabia Temple Shrine Circus
21 Nov 1955	Chicago	Chicago Heart Assn	Hilton Hotel
13 Dec 1955	Madisonville, KY	Municipal Park	Rizpah Shrine Circus
12 Feb 1956	Memphis		Al Chymia Shrine Circus
01 Mar 1956	Kansas City	Municipal Auditorium	Police Circus
02 Mar 1956	Topeka, KS		Shrine Circus
16 Mar 1956	Wichita, KS		Shrine Circus
17 Apr 1956	Bloomsbury, PA	Hunt Armory	Hamid Morton Shrine Circus
07 Jul 1956	Montreal	Belmont Park	
18 Jul 1956	Minneapolis	Golden Strand	Aqua Follies
18 Aug 1956	Toronto	CNE	
12 Sep 1956	Toronto	CNE	
14 Sep 1956	Sudbury, Ontario		4th annual Sudbury Rotary Exhibition
12 Jan 1957	Ft. Lauderdale	Jack Valentine's Supper Club Restaurant	Valentine's Ice Show
08 Mar 1957	Ft. Lauderdale	Jack Valentine's Supper Club Restaurant	Valentine's Ice Show
30 Mar 1957	Buffalo, NY	Buffalo Shrine Circus	Cavalcade Of Circuses
13 Apr 1957	Chicago	Chicago Stadium	Ice Capades
13 Jul 1957	Las Vegas	The Sands Cirque Room	
20 Jul 1957	Las Vegas	Hotel El Cortez	Rhythm On Ice Revue
02 Dec 1957		Municipal Auditorium	
04 Jan 1958	Chicago	Conrad Hilton Hotel	Merriel Abbott Ice Revue
25 Jan 1958	Chicago	Conrad Hilton Hotel	American Electroplaters Society 46th Educational Session and Banquet
07 Oct 1958	New York	Madison Square Garden	Ed Sullivan Show
11 May 1959	Philadelphia	Willow Grove Park	
24 Aug 1959	Toronto	CNE	
25 Jul 1960	Hagerstown MD	Hagerstown Fair	Ice Skating Extravaganza
18 Dec 1960	New York	Manhattan Savings	Christmas Show
12 Jan 1966	St. Petersburg	Indian Rocks	Jamboree On Ice
