= Festival of Life =

Festival of life may refer to:

- A celebration/festival of life, a funeral event focusing on one's accomplishments in life
- The 1968 Democratic National Convention protest activity, a historical event
