= Hillsboro High School (Illinois) =

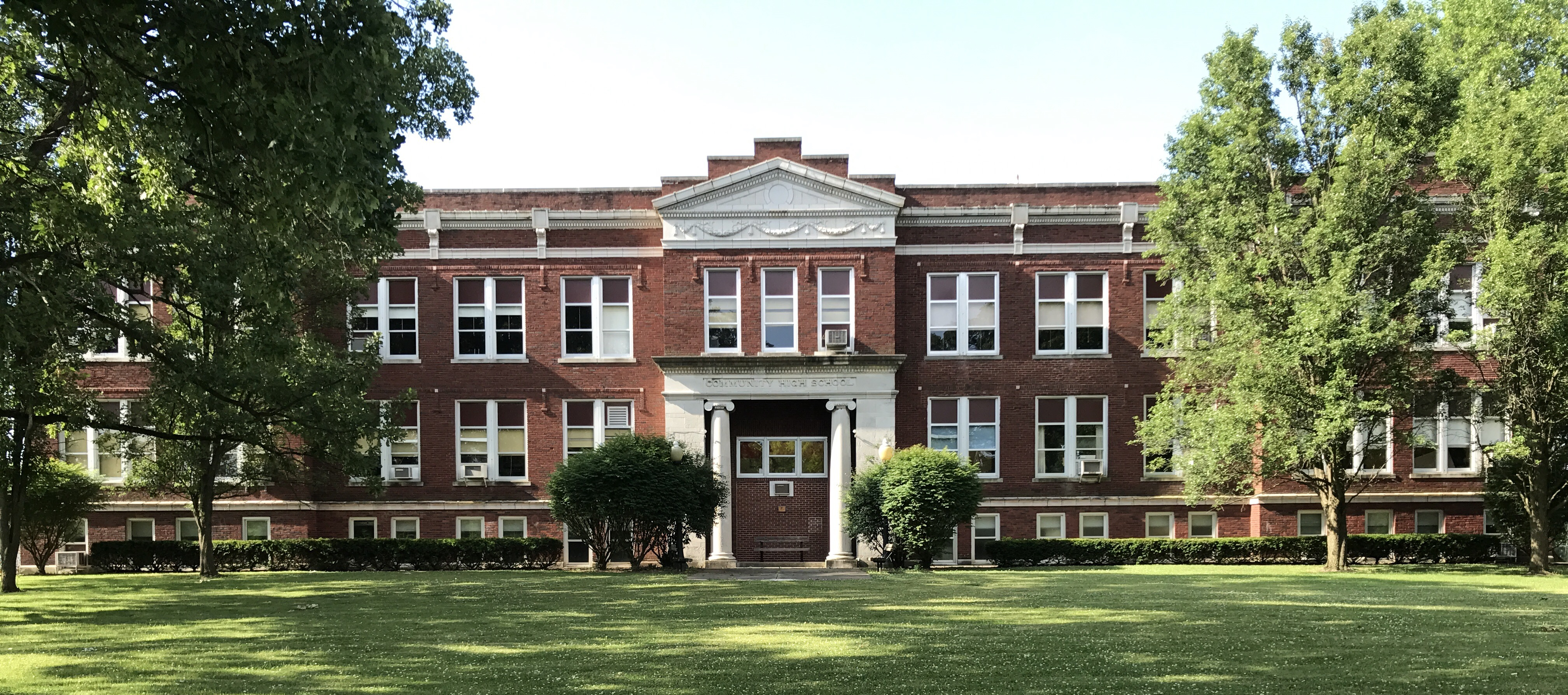
- The front of the main building.

Location
- 522 E. Tremont St. Hillsboro, Illinois 62049; United States; 39.151511°N 89.487205°W

Information
- School type: public secondary
- Opened: 1921 (replaced municipal high school)
- Status: open
- School district: Hillsboro CUSD
- Superintendent: David Powell
- Principal: Patti Heyen
- Teaching staff: 35.67 (FTE)
- Grades: 9–12
- Gender: coed
- Enrollment: 436 (2023-2024)
- Student to teacher ratio: 12.22
- Campus: small city in rural area
- Colours: Orange & Black
- Athletics conference: South Central
- Nickname: Hiltoppers
- Website: Hillsboro High School website

Hillsboro High School (HHS) is a coed public high school located in Hillsboro, Illinois, the county seat of Montgomery County, Illinois, in the United States. HHS is part of the Hillsboro Community Unit School District 3.

== History ==
In 1920, it was determined that the existing city high school on Fairground Ave. was no longer acceptable. After reorganizing the school's district, the decision was made to build a new school. The contract for the building designed by architect J. W. Kennedy was awarded on June 22, 1920 at a cost of about $250,000. The construction of the "new" Hillsboro High School was begun in 1920, and the school opened in the fall of 1921.

Sitting atop a hill located at 522 East Tremont Street, the north-facing red brick building is surrounded by trees. Through the years, into at least the mid-1960s, the campus was often named as the most beautiful in Illinois.

In 1938, the gymnasium, sited to the south of the main building was commissioned with financing for the project coming in part from Works Progress Administration (WPA) funds.

The agriculture building was added in the 1950s to the east of the gym, and the library/cafeteria building opened in 1962 just southeast of the main building.

In 2024, construction began on a new building, intended to be the new highschool. At the time of this being written, the new building has not been finished, though it has been predicted that the building will be finished until summer of 2026.

== Academics ==
In 2010, Hillsboro High school had an average ACT score of 19.6 with a graduation rate of 95.4% (which is higher than the state average of 87.8%). Since 2010, the school has failed to meet federal education standards set by No Child Left Behind even though in some years the school exceeds some statewide figures. The average class size is 19.6, which is smaller than the Illinois state average of 21.2.

College prep

Hillsboro High has Advanced Placement programs in Calculus, Chemistry, English Literature/ Composition, and History . On the PSAE examination of 11th graders, Hillsboro scored in the 52nd percentile of Illinois schools with 49.1% of the students passing. This translates to a 26.4% college readiness score.

== Interscholastic athletics & activities ==
Hillsboro High School sponsors teams known as the Hiltoppers that compete as members of the Illinois High School Association and the South Central Conference. The team colors are orange and black and the school mascot is the Hiltopper (a mountaineer with a pick and coil of rope ).

Boys sports

- Baseball
- Basketball (Freshman, JV & Varsity)
- Football (Freshman, JV & Varsity)
- Golf
- Soccer
- Tennis
- Track & Field
- Wrestling

Girls sports

- Basketball (Freshman, JV & Varsity)
- Cheerleading
- Golf
- Soccer
- Softball
- Tennis
- Track & Field
- Volleyball (Freshman, JV & Varsity)

== Notable alumni ==
- William Bader
- Brian Graden, television executive, MTV, VH1
- Mary Hartline, model and television personality, Super Circus
- Matt Hughes, two-time state champion wrestler; retired mixed martial artist, former Ultimate Fighting Championship Welterweight Champion, UFC Hall of Fame member
- Ralph Isselhardt, NFL player
- Harold Osborn, gold medal winner in the 1924 Summer Olympics in both the decathlon and high jump
- Frank M. Ramey, U.S. Representative from Illinois
- Mary Beth Zimmerman, professional golfer, 4-time winner on LPGA Tour between 1986 and 1995
