= Gaza war protests at the 2024 Democratic National Convention =

- Part of the 2024 United States presidential election and Gaza war protests
- Location: Chicago, Illinois
- Caused by: Gaza war; continuation of Israel–United States military relations during the Biden administration; nomination of Kamala Harris for president

During the 2024 Democratic National Convention (held August 19–22, 2024 in Chicago), Gaza war protests were staged by the "March on the DNC" coalition as well as other organizations. Related demonstrations were also staged at the convention by a number of delegates (including those aligned with the Uncommitted National Movement).

The protests were largely non-violent. The protest events attracted significantly fewer participants than organizers had predicted.

== Background ==
Police and protesters on the first day of the Democratic National Convention

In the months leading up of the convention, sizable Gaza war protests had included significant criticism of Biden administration's handling of relations with Israel amid the Gaza war were widely expected to be organized in Chicago during the convention. Numerous writers opined that the convention's handling of protests would carry high-stakes for the images of both Chicago and the Democratic party. Writers pointed to the poor handling by the Chicago Police Department of protests at the 1968 Democratic National Convention in the city as a cautionary tale for consequences both the city and party could face if protests were handled in an overly-aggressive or poorly-managed manner. Due to the convention being only the second to be held in Chicago since 1968, many stories were published into the lead-up to the convention raising the specter of 1968, and speculatively questioning whether the scenes seen at that convention would be repeated in 2024. However, the 2024 convention several major differences from 1968 that made this highly unlikely. One was that Chicago's mayor and police leadership in 2024 were less inclined to be highly-aggressive towards protesters than Richard J. Daley and his police leadership had been in 1968. Additionally, the Democratic delegates were overwhelmingly united behind a nominee heading into the 2024 convention (who had been formally nominated prior to the start of the convention), unlike the 1968 convention which was an open convention with deep divisions among delegates.

Chicago is home to the largest Palestinian ethnic enclave in the United States, sometimes referred to as "Little Palestine," and Chicago is the largest US city to pass a cease-fire resolution about the Gaza war. One anonymous protester described the choice to bring the convention there as a "slap in the face." In an interview with Mother Jones published prior to the convention, the Mayor of Chicago Brandon Johnson described Israel's actions in the Gaza Strip as genocidal.

In advance of the convention, a coalition called "March on the DNC 2024" was formed to organize large protests in Chicago during convention. Much of the protest activity at the convention was organized by this coalition, which touted itself as having 200 member groups. Causes represented at its protests included reproductive freedom, racial justice, and LGBTQ rights. However, its protests were heavily focused on the protesting against the US relationship with Israel and the Gaza war; and on calling for an arms embargo to be imposed on Israel, as well as a ceasefire to the war.

== Protest on eve of convention ==
The first of seven permitted protests for the convention took place on the eve of the convention. Hundreds marched along Michigan Avenue to Grant Park.

== August 19 ==
On the first day of the convention, March On the DNC held a rally in Union Park before proceeding to march. The Poor People's Army rallied in Humboldt Park. The crowd was largely peaceful and was observed to be "significantly smaller than predicted". Organizers planned for over 30 thousand people, but it appeared "only a few thousand showed up at Union Park". Organizers claimed a turnout of 15,000 but according to the BBC, the actual turnout appeared to be lower. Reuters estimated the turnout to be "several thousand". A security gate was toppled. Later, some protestors who returned to Union Park began setting up a tent encampment, but were peacefully dispersed by police.

Protesters' chants included phrases such as "From the river to the sea, Palestine will be free", "End the occupation now!" and "The whole world is watching!": a symbolic nod to the anti-Vietnam War protests that occurred when the Democratic National Convention was held in Chicago in 1968.

The Poor People's Army held a protest that attracted 100 demonstrators, beginning with an afternoon rally at Humboldt Park before marching to the security perimeter around the United Center (the main venue of the convention). Among the participants was Jill Stein, who was running a third party campaign for president as the nominee of the Green Party. At the perimeter, the protesters then attempted to gain access to the convention's secure zone, insisting that they were attempting to deliver a warrant against the Democratic Party for citizens arrest for "crimes against humanity". Several of its protesters knocked over fencing and momentarily breached the hard security zone perimeter, resulting in several arrests. In response to the breach, an additional layer of fencing was added over the night that followed. Several other Gaza War protesters were separately arrested on the first day of the convention during their attempt to stage an unpermitted demonstration outside of the Israeli Consulate in Chicago.

On the convention floor at the United Center, during Joe Biden's speech, a number of delegates from Connecticut, Michigan and Florida unfurled a banner that said "STOP ARMING ISRAEL" and were escorted out of the building. The Council on American–Islamic Relations condemned DNC audience members who assaulted a Muslim woman and other delegates that were holding a banner that read "stop arming Israel". Thirteen protesters were arrested on the first day. During his speech, Joe Biden voiced partial agreement with the protesters by acknowledging that bloodshed in the war indeed warranted concern. Biden remarked that the demonstrators "out on the street have a point".

== August 20 ==
A group called "Behind Enemy Lines" planned a protest at the Israeli Consulate in Chicago. Flyers for the event said "Make it great like '68! Shut down the DNC for Gaza." Police blocked the group from marching minutes into the protest and arrested dozens of protesters dressed in black bloc who attempted to break through the line. More arrests occurred at the end of the night. Some protesters claimed they were arrested as they were trying to leave but Police Superintendent Larry Snelling denied that they had used the federally prohibited kettling tactic. An organizer for CODEPINK unfurled a banner on the convention floor that said "Free Free Palestine."

During the ceremonial roll call of delegates on the convention floor to decide the Democratic party nominee for president, dozens of delegates voted "Present" as a protest vote. Some of these delegates publicly expressed they voted this way to express frustration with the Biden-Harris administration's handling of the war in Gaza. The delegates who voted "Present" had their votes voiced out loud by the state delegations during the roll call. Although notably, the Kentucky Democratic Party was the only state delegation that did not announce their ‘present’ votes in the roll call.

Protesters standing near the Fiserv Forum ahead of the rally there

A group of protesters demonstrated outside of the Fiserv Forum in Milwaukee, where Kamala Harris and Tim Walz held a rally on the second evening of the convention. During Harris' remarks inside the arena, protesters unfurled banner and attempted to interrupt her remarks by shouting.

== August 21 ==
A breakfast for delegates at a nearby hotel was disrupted when unknown individuals put maggots in food. Organizers from CODEPINK disrupted a luncheon for women senators at a nearby restaurant. A pro-Israel protest occurred at Union Park while a thousand pro-Palestinian protesters marched past it.

When the Uncommitted National Movement was informed that the DNC wouldn't allow a Palestinian speaker, Uncommitted delegates staged a sit-in outside the convention. The activists again called for an arms embargo on Israel, and emphasized the suffering of children in Gaza. A Michigan delegate said his strategy was to initially work within the Democratic hierarchy from the inside, and that it was frustrating the Harris campaign had denied their requests. The group was joined inside the security perimeter by healthcare workers, members of the Chicago Teachers Union, Muslim Women for Harris, and US Representatives Summer Lee, Ilhan Omar and Cori Bush. Alexandria Ocasio-Cortez joined via FaceTime. Among the names submitted as potential speakers were Illinois state Rep. Abdelnasser Rashid and Georgia state Rep. Ruwa Romman.

== August 22 ==
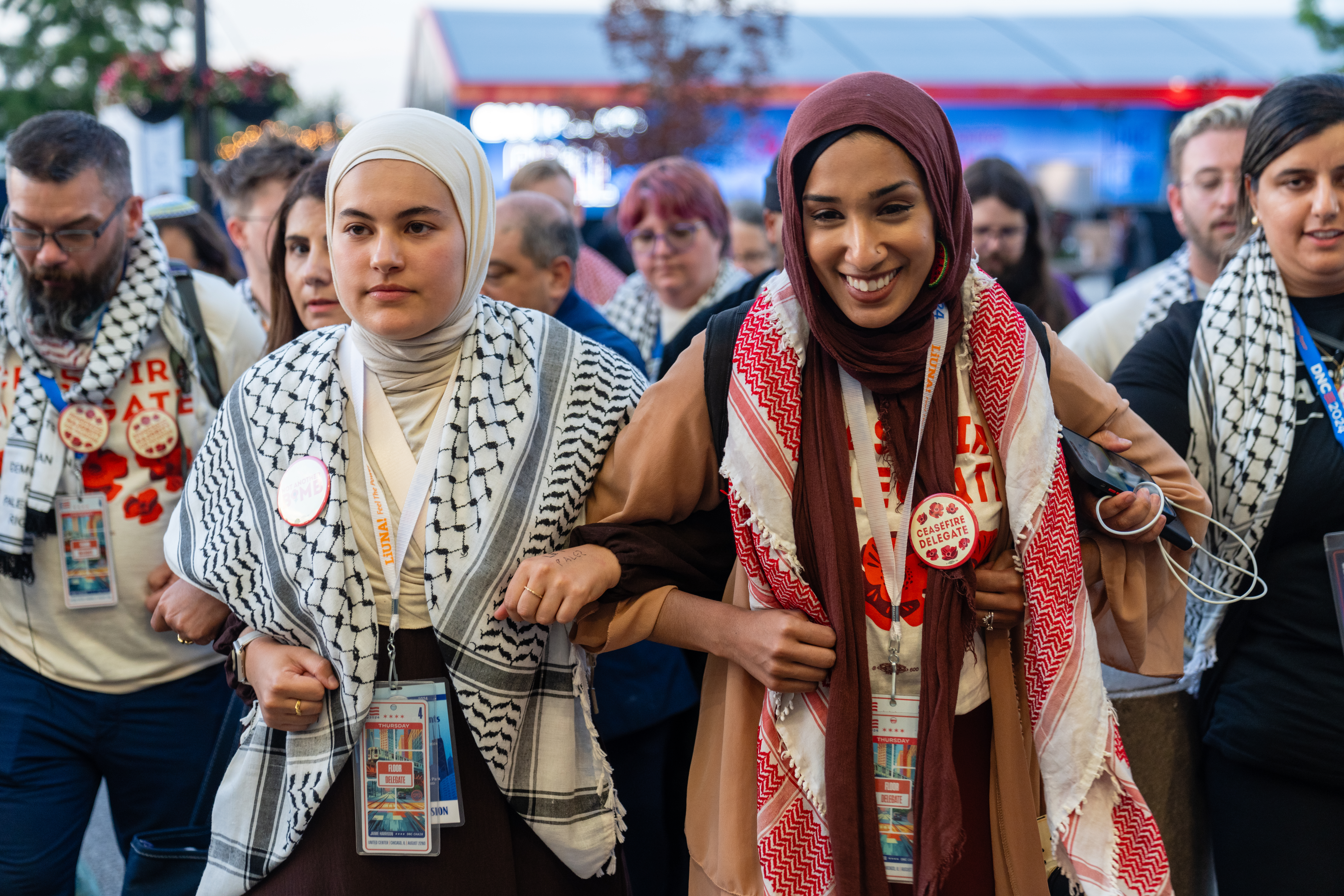
Uncommitted delegates locking arms during their protest

About 40 Uncommitted delegate staged a sit-in on the final evening of the convention, spending the night on the sidewalk outside the United Center and remained there in the morning. The protesting delegates objected to the party not meeting their demand for a speaker representing their cause to be given a speaking slot on the evening program, particularly taking issue with the lack of a Palestinian-centered speech in light of the parents of Hersh Goldberg-Polin (an American-Israeli hostage taken by Hamas) being given a speaking slot. As a result, Muslim Women for Harris-Walz announced it would disband and Uncommitted delegates were seen through Union Center locked arm in arm, wearing Keffiyehs and chanting "Ceasefire now." More protesters blocked roads as attendees left the convention for the night. Some chanted “We’re young, we’re strong, we’ll rally all night long.” Footage emerged of some delegates covering their ears while being confronted by protesters.

== Size and character of protests ==
The number of protesters that participated in protests at the conventions ultimately fell far short of pre-convention expectations. March on the DNC 2024 had announced an expectation of 20,000 participants at their protest on the conventions opening day. The actual protest turnout was significantly smaller, with city officials estimating that the participating crowd was roughly 3,500. An Associated Press story published shortly after the conclusion of the convention commented, "as far as Chicago’s storied protests go, the numbers outside the Democratic National Convention were unremarkable."

Protests at the convention, including the Gaza War related protests, were by large peaceful. However, on the convention's first day a number of protesters were arrested. Some were arrested for tearing down a portion of the security fencing near the United Center. Others were arrested after an unsanctioned demonstration was held outside of the Israeli Consulate in Chicago.

== See also ==
- Schedule of the 2024 Democratic National Convention
- 2004 Republican National Convention protest activity —anti-war protests at a presidential convention
- 2000 Democratic National Convention protest activity
