= Music of the Spheres Society =

Classical music non-profit organization

- Origin: New York City, New York, U.S.
- Genres: Classical
- Years active: 2001–present
- Members: Stephanie Chase; Ann Ellsworth; Hsin-Yun Huang; Jon Manasse
- Website: www.musicofthespheres.org

Inspired by the Neoplatonic academies of 16th and 17th-century Italy, which combined discourse with musical presentations, the Music of the Spheres Society was founded in 2001 by its artistic director and violinist, Stephanie Chase, and hornist Ann Ellsworth. Its first concert took place in New York City on November 1, 2001, the proceeds of which were donated to families of firefighters from two nearby stations who were killed at the World Trade Center disaster.

The mission of the society is to promote classical music through innovative chamber music concerts and pre-concert lectures which illuminate music’s historical, philosophical and scientific foundations, in order to give greater context for music to the average audience member.

The Music of the Spheres Society features a core group of artists - Stephanie Chase (violin), Hsin-Yun Huang (viola), and Jon Manasse (clarinet) - plus guest artists that include soloists, chamber musicians, and principal members of the Metropolitan Opera Orchestra. Its concerts feature works composed for one to nine performers, dating from the 16th to 21st centuries. Many of the Society's artists specialize in historically informed performance practices or contemporary music.

Of a performance by the Society of Messiaen's Quartet for the End of Time, a New York Times critic wrote: "These musicians brought the music vividly to life in every particular. They should be playing it everywhere. They should go on the road with it tomorrow."

Concert programs presented by the Society explore the contexts of music and include chamber music master-pieces, lesser-known works, and world or US premieres. Contemporary music performed by the Society has included world premieres and works by Edward Applebaum, John Harbison, Lou Harrison, and Jose Evangelista. Works by less-known composers - such as Juan Arriaga, Johan Kvandal, Leoš Janáček, Jan Dussek, Zdenek Fibich, and Bohuslav Martinu - are programmed alongside composers such as Brahms, Schubert, Mozart, Ravel, Beethoven, and Prokofiev.

Since 2001 the Society has presented a series of chamber music concerts in New York City - at venues that include Weill Recital Hall at Carnegie Hall, Merkin Concert Hall, the Society for Ethical Culture - and has been presented by concert organizations that include The Metropolitan Museum of Art, Dallas Chamber Music and Troy (NY) Friends of Music. The Society presents concerts on both original and modern style instruments.

Lectures presented by the Society focus primarily on a philosophical, scientific, or historic aspect of music and reveal some of the historic contexts of composed music. Guest lecturers have included music historians, an organologist, a Freudian analyst, music therapists, and ethnomusicologists.

“Music of the Spheres” is a term applied to an idea put forth by the Greek scholar Pythagoras (6th century BCE) and his followers, among them Plato and Kepler, that the proportional ratios used to describe musical intervals also refer to those of the physical universe, including the orbiting motion of planets. Pythagoras recognized the innate connection between musical sound, or its “pitch,” and the physical characteristics of an object producing that sound. He is credited with discovering the physical laws of musical sound through his observations that the ratio of mass - as in a vibrating string length sounding an interval - of a fifth is 2:3, that of an octave is 1:2, and that of the fourth is 3:4. Thus, he proved that there is a correlation between the vibrations of sound and the physical world, such as that of numbers and proportion. (See Music and mathematics.)

Incorporated in February 2002, the Music of the Spheres Society is a non-profit, 501 c(3) organization.
