= Ralph Isselhardt =

American football player (1910–1972)

- Isselhardt in 1936

No. 15
- Position: Guard

Personal information
- Born: January 13, 1910; Hillsboro, Illinois, U.S.
- Died: October 24, 1972 (aged 62); Grand Rapids, Michigan, U.S.
- Listed height: 6 ft 1 in (1.85 m)
- Listed weight: 205 lb (93 kg)

Career information
- High school: Marion (Marion, Indiana)
- College: Franklin (IN)

Career history
- Detroit Lions (1936); Cleveland Rams (1937)

Career NFL statistics
- Games played: 9
- Starts: 0
- Stats at Pro Football Reference

Ralph L. "Izzy" Isselhardt (January 13, 1910 – October 24, 1972) was an American professional football player who played in the National Football League (NFL) for the Detroit Lions and Cleveland Rams. He played college football at Franklin College and was inducted into that school's Hall of Fame in 1975.

== Early life ==
He first enrolled at Hillsboro High School in Hillsboro, Illinois before transferring to Marion High School in Marion, Indiana.

== College career ==
Isselhardt played for the Franklin Grizzlies. He was a co-captain of the team during his 1935 senior season.

He graduated with a degree from Franklin College in June 1936.

== Professional career ==
Isselhardt signed a contract to play with the Lions for the 1936 season early in March of that year. Training camp was expected to open during the first half of August.

Known as "Izzy" to his teammates, Isselhardt played in one game for the Detroit Lions in 1936, before being assigned to a minor league farm club for additional experience.

Isselhardt signed with the Cleveland Rams for the 1937 season and saw action in eight games for the team.

== Death and legacy ==
Isselhardt died October 24, 1972, at Grand Rapids, Michigan.

He was inducted into the Franklin College Athletic Hall of Fame in 1975.
