= Songs of Innocence and Experience (Allen Ginsberg album) =

Studio album by Allen Ginsberg
- Released: 1970
- Recorded: June – July, December 1969
- Studio: Apostolic (New York)
- Genres: Folk; folk rock; jazz
- Length: 38:45
- Labels: MGM; Verve Forecast
- Producers: Barry Miles; Peter Orlovsky

Allen Ginsberg chronology
| Ginsberg's Thing (1969) | Songs of Innocence and Experience (1970) | America Today! (The World's Greatest Poets Vol. I) (1971) |

Songs of Innocence and Experience is an album by American beat poet and writer Allen Ginsberg, recorded in 1969. For the recording, Ginsberg sang pieces from 18th-century English poet William Blake's illustrated poetry collection of the same name and set them to a folk-based instrumental idiom, featuring simple melodies and accompaniment performed with a host of jazz musicians. Among the album's contributors were trumpeter Don Cherry, arranger/pianist Bob Dorough, multi-instrumentalist Jon Sholle, drummer Elvin Jones, and Peter Orlovsky – Ginsberg's life-partner and fellow poet – who contributed vocals and helped produce the recording with British underground writer Barry Miles.

The album is one of the most famous attempts at setting lyrics from Blake's Songs collection to music. Ginsberg, having studied the rhyme and meter of the poems, believed they were originally intended to be sung and that a Blakean musical performance could roughly be replicated. The themes explored in Blake's poems – childhood and abuse, organized religion, institutionalization, and poverty – connected with Ginsberg spiritually. He was inspired to undertake the project by a religious vision of Blake from decades earlier and his witnessing the 1968 Democratic National Convention protest activity, as well as rock music of the era's counterculture, citing its qualities of poetry and consciousness.

The album was first released in 1970 on LP by MGM Records and Verve Forecast Records, selling poorly but receiving critical acclaim. It soon went out of print, while a follow-up release of more Blake recordings, planned with Fantasy Records, never materialized. In 2017, Omnivore Recordings released The Complete Songs of Innocence and Experience, a double CD featuring the original album and previously unreleased Blakean recordings by Ginsberg from 1971.

== Background ==
Now like a mighty wind they raise to heaven the voice of song.

— William Blake in "Holy Thursday" (Songs of Innocence, 1789)

In 1948, Ginsberg experienced what he described as a religious vision of 18th-century English poet William Blake appearing in his East Harlem apartment and reciting poetry to him. He was profoundly moved by this experience and inspired to set Blake's poetry to music. According to art historian Stephen F. Eisenman, "all at once, Ginsberg later said, he apprehended the unity of things material and spiritual, religious and carnal. Looking out the window, he saw 'into the depths of the universe' and understood that 'this was the moment that I was born for.'" Ginsberg's interest in Blake resurfaced in the late 1960s when he began to research Western Gnosticism for philosophical reasons.

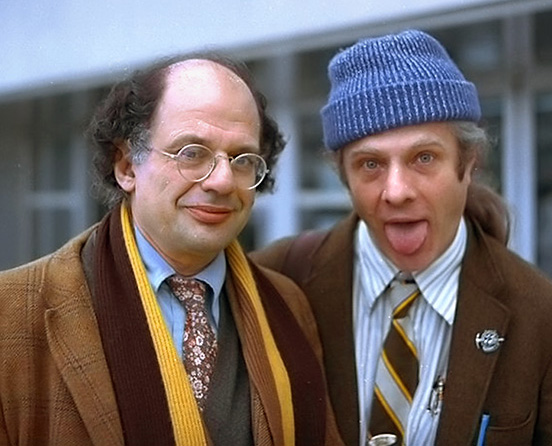
Allen Ginsberg (left) in 1978 with poet and life-partner Peter Orlovsky, who contributed to the album

Ginsberg came to believe that Blake's poems were originally composed for the purpose of being sung and that, by studying their rhyme and meter, such a performance could be roughly reproduced. He planned to record musical adaptations of poems from Blake's illustrated Songs of Innocence and of Experience collection, which thematized the importance and sanctity of childhood, featuring critiques of systemic child abuse ("The Chimney Sweeper"), organized religion ("The Garden of Love"), and "the institutionalized culture of benevolence that perpetuated poverty" ("Holy Thursday"). The poetry collection, Ginsberg said, "seemed the nearest thing to holy mantra or holy prayer poetry that I could find in my own consciousness".

Ginsberg was also inspired by the rock music of 1960s counterculture, citing acts like the Beatles, the Rolling Stones, Bob Dylan, the Byrds, Grateful Dead, Jefferson Airplane, the Fugs, the Band, and Donovan. As Ginsberg recalled, "all the lovely youthful bands that have been wakening the conscience of the world, really, were approaching high poetry and cosmic consciousness in their content, so I was interested in seeing if Blake's highest poetry could be vocalised, tuned, and sung in the context of the Beatles' 'I Am the Walrus' or 'Day in the Life of' [sic] or in the context of 'Sad-eyed Lady of the Lowland' [sic] or 'John Wesley Harding' by Dylan." Ginsberg added that he wanted to present Blake in a way that would interest Dylan, who had disliked the poet. Ginsberg's witness of the 1968 Democratic National Convention protests and riot in Chicago provided an impetus to record the album.

== Writing and recording ==
After leaving Chicago, Ginsberg went to upstate New York, where he had bought a farm as a retreat with money earned from his poetry readings. There, he experimented setting Blake's poems to music on a pump organ. He told Publishers Weekly in June 1969 that he was learning to notate music while working on the Blake settings. That same month, he began recording the album at Apostolic Recording Studio in New York City's Lower Manhattan. British underground writer and businessman Barry Miles was enlisted to produce the recording, and Ginsberg helped set him up at the legendary Hotel Chelsea, paying for and negotiating a favorable rent from its manager Stanley Bard, who knew and respected the poet. By this time, Ginsberg had composed some of the music he would use as settings for Blake's poems.

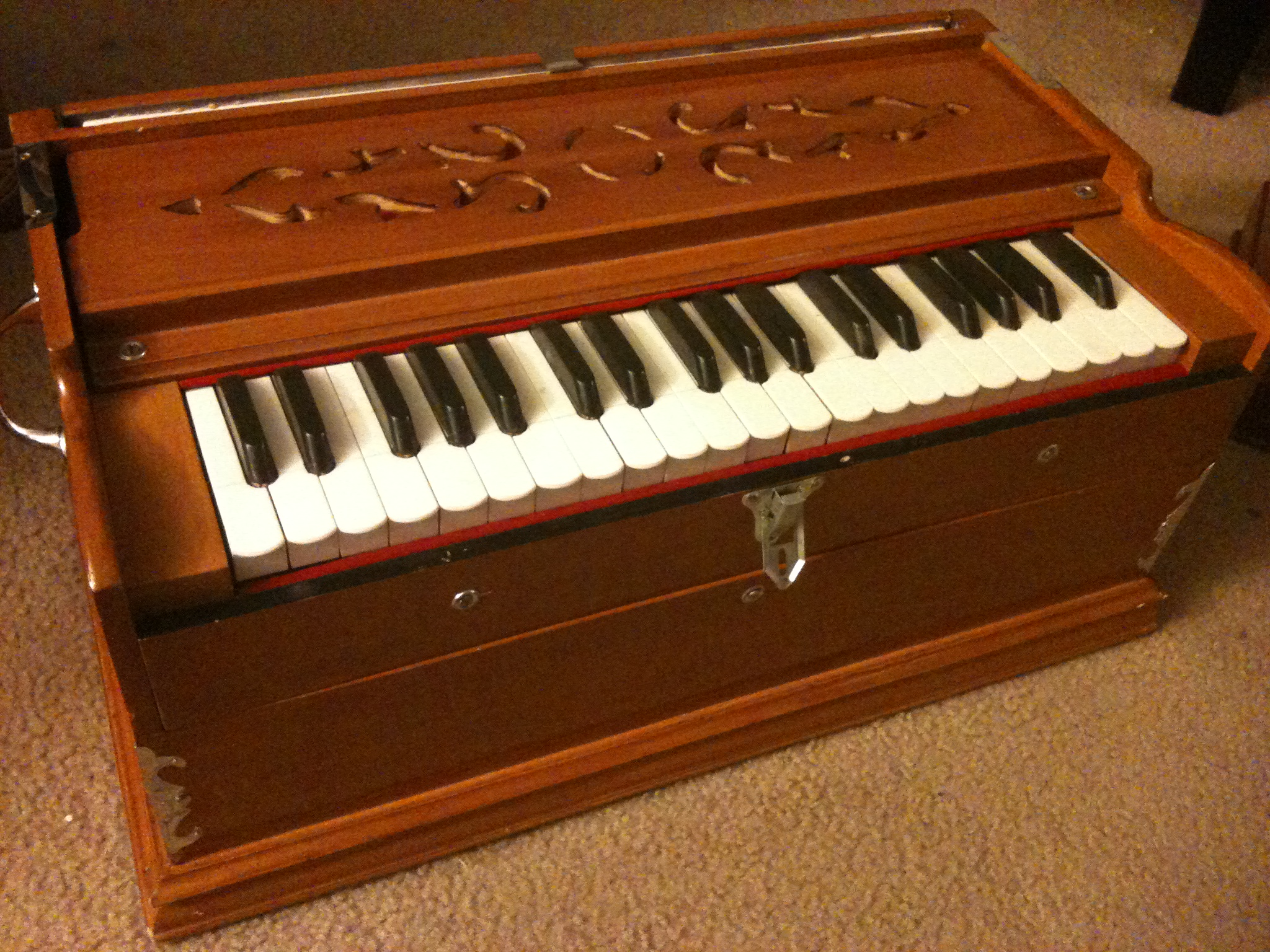
A harmonium similar to Ginsberg's

In studio, Ginsberg sang and played harmonium, piano, and finger cymbals for Songs of Innocence and Experience. The harmonium, played before by Ginsberg at numerous poetry readings, was borrowed from his life-partner and fellow poet Peter Orlovsky, who had received the instrument as a souvenir from Benares during the pair's visit to India in the early 1960s. Orlovsky also contributed vocals to the recording and assisted Miles with its production.

Ginsberg was accompanied by a host of jazz musicians during the recording sessions, including trumpeter Don Cherry, bassist Herman Wright, guitarist Jon Sholle, French horn player Julius Watkins, and arranger/vocalist/pianist Bob Dorough. Drummer Elvin Jones was enlisted to play on the album's final track, "The Grey Monk". Ginsberg also invited bassist Charles Mingus to perform on the album, but Mingus declined. According to Miles, the recording also featured saxophonist Archie Shepp, although he is not named in the album credits.

The album's recording produced 19 tracks, nine of which were recorded during the sessions held from June to July 1969. According to several scholarly sources, Songs of Innocence and Experience was completed later that year in December.

== Musical style ==
...simple lyrics have great authority when employed to construct dreamlike or nightmarish images...

— Ginsberg on Blake's poetry

According to English scholar Jonathan Roberts, the resulting music sets Blake's poems to a folk music idiom. The songs on the album average under two minutes in length. Ginsberg's melodies and the accompanying instrumentation are noted for their simplicity, with Peter Frank from Fanfare describing the accompaniment as "mantra-like".

Vocally, Ginsberg demonstrates a lithe, high-toned delivery and the dramatic character of what Ink 19 magazine's James Mann calls "a poet's voice". His New York accent is also said by Mann to make the stanzas "breathe". Lester Bangs compares the poet's vocal style on the album to that of a mu'azzin – a mosque appointee who recites the call to prayer – but one who is Anglo-American. In the opinion of Relix magazine's Jeff Tamarkin, Ginsberg's "intonations and somewhat droning delivery" of Blake's words possess a grasp on their "inherent rhythms and melodies", pitted against contemporary "folk-rock/jazz-based forms".

== Release and reception ==
Songs of Innocence and Experience was released as an LP record in 1970 by MGM Records and Verve Forecast Records. The record was credited as being "by William Blake, tuned by Allen Ginsberg", while its production was credited to "Miles Associates". Despite selling poorly, it was one of the most famous musical adaptations of Blake's Songs collection.

Reviewing in April 1970 for The Village Voice, music critic Robert Christgau gave the record an "A" and hailed it as "a collaboration of genius". He credited Ginsberg for singing in the manner of Blake's writing – "crude, human, touching, and superb" – and enhancing the source material with his musicians, a feat Christgau found seemingly impossible. In Rolling Stone, Bangs applauded Ginsberg's vocals and found the record effortless and unpretentious, "like a labor of love, a salute from a young visionary to an ancient sage, executed with delicacy and charm". John G. Simon from The Harvard Crimson said the music demonstrates a range of styles and is not the most accessible but still unforgettable, offering listeners a way to remember the words to Blake's poetry as they would know the lyrics to popular music songs. In The New Yorker, Ellen Willis said of the album, "It's a beautiful record, which makes me happy every time I hear it – but then most of what Ginsberg does has that effect on me. He should be persuaded to record a collection of mantras next."

== Legacy ==
Retrospective professional reviews
Review scores
| Source | Rating |
|---|---|
| AllMusic (2017 CD) | 4/5 stars |
| Christgau's Record Guide (1970 LP) | A− |
| Tom Hull – on the Web | B+ |

Ginsberg later considered buying the rights to the album back from MGM – through a deal he and Miles had arranged with Fantasy Records – so that he could record the remainder of Blake's Songs collection and release the recordings as a double album. Fantasy offered them a five-album deal with an advance and paid studio time to master the recordings, more than hundred of which Miles had already edited for a series of spoken-word and mantra records. According to Miles, the mastering was to be finished by June 1971, when Ginsberg was planning to leave for Australia. However, Ginsberg complicated the matter by having more tapes mailed to him from the various colleges where his poetry recitals had been recorded. In August, Ginsberg sent the master tapes to Fantasy, along with a letter saying he wants to rerecord and remix some of the songs and that he has recorded 16 albums of poems. The letter also noted his desire to postpone contract negotiations until he finishes traveling with poet Gary Snyder to the Sierras and to India. The albums were never released.

At the time, Ginsberg also considered making an album of Blake settings with David Axelrod, a Los Angeles-based producer and composer best known for his successful tenure at Capitol Records. Axelrod had released his own instrumental interpretations of Blake's Songs collection on two albums – Song of Innocence (1968) and Songs of Experience (1969) – which fused sounds from pop, jazz, rock, and theater music. Ginsberg and Axelrod discussed ideas for a project on several occasions, including an album of both Blake and Ginsberg poems, but it never materialized either due to other pursuits and priorities.

The original Songs of Innocence and Experience eventually went out of print and remained so until the release of The Complete Songs of Innocence and Experience by Omnivore Recordings on June 23, 2017. A double-CD reissue, the Omnivore set featured a second disc of previously unreleased recordings of Blake settings and other spiritually-themed performances, recorded by Ginsberg in San Francisco between July and August 1971. Reviewing the reissue for AllMusic, Thom Jurek said, "As much of a treasure as this document is, it's disc two that holds the greatest revelations. ... As a whole, they are an inspiring, provocative, and life-affirming chapter in his legacy." In 2019, Gavin Edwards included the original album in a piece for Rolling Stone covering 10 "weird" albums the magazine praised in the 1970s but "you've never heard", writing that Ginsberg's adaptation "was more literary than musical, but listening to him, one couldn't help but get caught up in the rush of words and images."

== Track listing ==
All compositions are credited to Allen Ginsberg and William Blake; production is credited to Barry Miles and Peter Orlovsky.

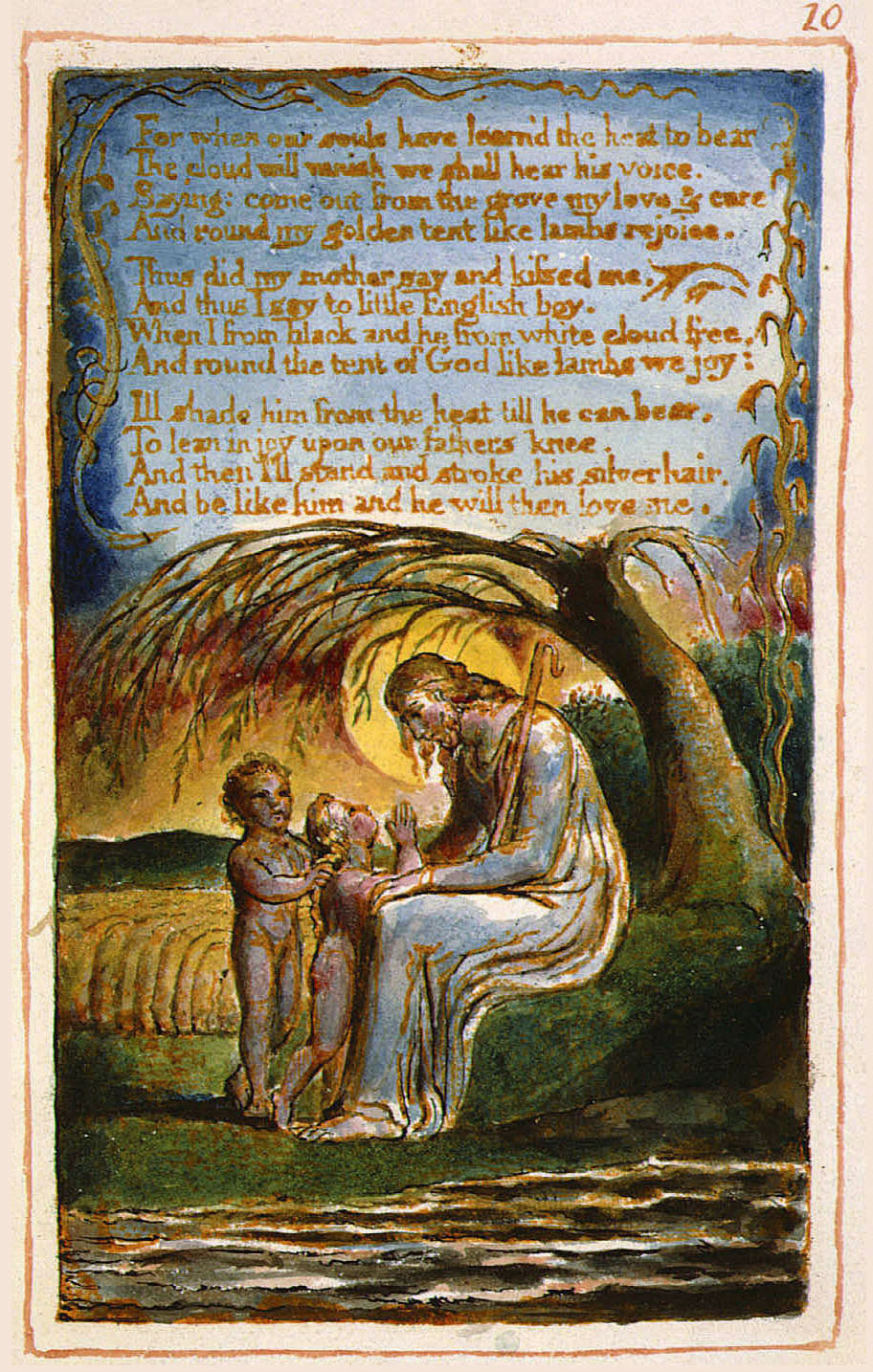
Copy AA of William Blake's hand-painted print of "The Little Black Boy" – printed and painted in 1826, and currently held by the Fitzwilliam Museum in Cambridge. This image also features on the album cover.

LP: Side one

1. (a) "Introduction" / (b) "The Shepherd" – 2:11
2. "The Echoing Green" – 1:27
3. "The Lamb" – 1:15
4. "The Little Black Boy" – 3:05
5. "The Blossom" – 1:27
6. "The Chimney Sweepers" – 2:24
7. "The Little Boy Lost" – 1:09
8. (a) "The Little Boy Found" / (b) "Laughing Song" – 1:31
9. "Holy Thursday" – 1:18
10. "Night" – 4:01

LP: Side two

1. "Introduction" – 2:09
2. "Nurses Song" – 2:10
3. "The Sick Rose" – 1:41
4. "Ah! Sun-Flower" – 1:18
5. "The Garden of Love" – 1:08
6. "London" – 2:01
7. "The Human Abstract" – 2:35
8. "To Tirzah" – 1:47
9. "The Grey Monk" – 4:13

=== The Complete Songs of Innocence and Experience ===
The 2017 two-CD reissue by Omnivore combines the LP sides as tracks 1–19 on one CD and adds the following:

CD one: Bonus tracks

20. "The Grey Monk" (alternate take) – 3:20
21. "Brothels of Paris" – 3:47

CD two: Blake Songs

1. "A Cradle Song" – 5:04
2. "The Divine Image" – 2:49
3. "Spring" – 4:21
4. "Nurse's Song" – 6:02
5. "Infant Joy" – 2:22
6. "A Dream" – 3:11
7. "On Another Sorrow" – 3:51
8. "Holy Thursday" – 4:32
9. "The Fly" – 0:52
10. "The School Boy" – 3:55
11. "The Voice of the Ancient Bard" – 1:16

CD two: Mantras

12. "Padmasambhava Mantra" – 12:03
13. "Om Namah Shivaye" – 4:55
14. "Roghupati Raghava" – 6:09

== Personnel ==
Credits for the 2017 CD, taken from AllMusic:

- Michael Aldrich – choir/chorus
- Greg Allen – design, reissue art direction
- Dave Baker – engineering
- Gordon Ball – photography
- Audrey Bilger – project assistance
- William Blake – composition, illustrations
- Cyril Caster – arrangement, choir/chorus, French horn, guitar, trumpet
- Don Cherry – bass, choir/chorus, finger cymbals, gourd, harpsichord, sleigh bells, trumpet, wood flute
- Lee Crabtree – arrangement
- Dutch Cramblitt – project assistance
- Elsa Dorfman – project assistance
- Bob Dorough – arrangement, choir/chorus, harpsichord, organ, piano, project assistance
- Allen Ginsberg – arrangement, choir/chorus, composition, finger cymbals, harmonium, piano, Tibetan trumpet, tuning, vocals
- Elaine Gongora – art direction
- Michael Graves – mastering, restoration
- Peter Hale – associate production
- Matt Hoffman – choir/chorus
- Peter Hornbeck – viola, violin
- Elvin Jones – drums
- John Kilgore – project assistance
- Steve Knutson – project assistance
- Tim Lawrence – project assistance
- Tom Lee – project assistance
- Sid Maurer – art direction
- Fred McDarrah – photography
- Michael McInnerney – cover photo
- Jon Meyer – flute, project assistance
- Barry Miles – photography, production
- Tim Noakes – project assistance
- Bill O'Hanlon – project assistance
- Peter Orlovsky – production, vocals
- Kari Pearson – editorial supervision
- Brad Rosenberger – project assistance
- Arthur Russell – cello
- Jerry Schmidt – photography
- Alan Senauke – mandolin, project assistance
- Jon Sholle – arrangement, autoharp, bass, drums, electric bass, guitar
- Dorothy Stefanski – editorial supervision
- Pat Thomas – compilation production, liner notes
- John Townley – project assistance
- Julius Watkins – French horn
- Herman Wright – bass
- Peter Wright – project assistance
- Janet Zeitz – choir/chorus, flute

== See also ==
- William Blake in popular culture
