= Claude Kirchner =

American entertainer and announcer (1916–1993)

- Born: Klaus von Hindenburg Kirchner; February 11, 1916; Rostock, Germany
- Died: March 8, 1993 (aged 77); Hawthorne, New York, U.S.
- Occupations: Entertainer; announcer
- Years active: 1933–1986
- Known for: Ladies Be Seated; Housewive's Holiday; Super Circus; Magic Midway; Terrytoon Circus / Merrytoon Circus; Scrub Club; Super Adventure Theater
- Spouses: Ruth Ross (divorced): Marilyn Friedel Klein
- Children: 2

Claude Kirchner (February 11, 1916 – March 8, 1993), was an American television announcer and personality whose 50-year career in radio and television included hosting popular children's programs in Chicago and New York City from 1949 until 1970. The best known of these were Super Circus, Terrytoon Circus / Merrytoon Circus and Super Adventure Theater.

== Early years ==
Klaus von Hindenburg Kirchner was born during the middle of World War I in Rostock, a Baltic Sea port city of the German Empire. In 1925, at the age of 9, he moved with his family to the United States, settling in the Chicago suburb of Riverside, Illinois where he was a student at Riverside Brookfield High School. He grew to be 6 ft 6 in (198 cm), and, in 1933, at age 17, found employment at the Century of Progress Chicago World's Fair as a barker, which included an assignment at one of the fair's most famous exhibits, starring fan dancer Sally Rand. After finishing school, Kirchner traveled to Europe as a member of a freighter's crew and visited in Munich with his cousin, German actress Gefion Helmke.

Planning to become a physician, he attended University of Chicago and then Southern Methodist University in Dallas, where he found work as a barker at another world's fair, the city's 1936 Texas Centennial Exposition and, after it ended, decided on a career change, becoming an announcer at Dallas' and Texas' oldest radio station WRR-AM. He subsequently returned to Illinois, announcing at Rockford's WROK, then worked for WTMJ in Milwaukee and eventually moved to Chicago's WGN.

In 1943 he enlisted in the U.S. Coast Guard, serving in the South West Pacific theatre of World War II and rising through the ranks from seaman second class to lieutenant.

== Children's TV host ==
Leaving military service in 1946, Kirchner was hired as a DJ and announcer at Chicago's AM station WIND. He subsequently transferred to NBC as the announcer and participant on the network's daytime talk program The Bob & Kay Show, served as the announcer on the radio and television game show, Ladies Be Seated, which was carried on American Broadcasting Company until July 1950 and, with his wife, Ruth Ross, hosted another ABC daytime show Housewive's Holiday.

He gained national fame, however, as a result of his central role as the ringmaster and announcer on the popular hour-long Sunday afternoon children's program Super Circus, originating from WBKB-TV and seen on ABC from 1949 until 1956. The show's renown was greatly enhanced by his co-host, baton-twirling drum majorette-bandleader Mary Hartline. They were both featured on the cover of the August 21, 1953 issue of TV Guide Magazine. In June 1955, ice-skating Jinx the chimpanzee was added as a regular participant. On December 18, a month after Super Circus moved from Chicago to New York City, Kirchner left the show and started a new ringmaster career at the city's TV station WOR-TV Channel 9.

The new show — Terrytoon Circus — premiered on October 22, 1956, and was seen Monday through Friday at 7 pm. Most of the daily episodes opened with Kirchner's hand puppet, Clownie, breaking through a paper hoop and announcing the host as either "CK", "Skinny Bones" or "High Pockets". Circus music would be heard, followed by Kirchner walking out, wearing a circus ringmaster's uniform and intoning, "Ladies and gentlemen and children of ohhhhhhhhhhhhh...all ages... welcome to Terrytoon Circus." He would perform brief cross-talking routines with Clownie and introduce Terrytoons as well as other cartoons.

From May to September 1957 on channel 9, while continuing to host Terrytoon Circus, Kirchner hosted an afternoon children's series, The Scrub Club, which presented him as the leader of a children's clubhouse. Starting in September 1959, Kirchner was seen seven days a week since, in addition to continuing with Terrytoon Circus, he took on the hosting duties of a Saturday and Sunday movie series, Super Adventure Theater, which showcased theatrical films from the 1930s, 1940s and 1950s that were considered to be appropriate for viewing by children and adolescents. In 1962, Terrytoon Circus was advised that it no longer had permission to use the copyrighted name "Terrytoon" and, as of April 30, it was introduced under the new name "Merrytoon Circus".

Also, for five and-a-half months in 1962–63, from September 22 until March 6, Kirchner took on still additional duties as a nationally seen Saturday morning personality when NBC hired him in his familiar and continuing guise as a ringmaster for the 11:30–noon children's circus series Marx Magic Midway.

Six months after the cancelation of Marx Magic Midway, on September 20, 1963, Merrytoon Circus also came to an end. Super Adventure Theater continued on weekends for another four years until it too was canceled in 1967. A year later, on August 26, 1968, Channel 9 premiered a daily afternoon revival of The Scrub Club, but it lasted only three-and-a-half months, closing on December 13. Six weeks later, Kirchner was given his final children's show assignment, once again as the ringmaster as well as the announcer and co-host, of channel 9's Bozo the World's Most Famous Clown show. His first appearance was on February 3, 1969, with the assignment ending a year later, on January 30, 1970.

== Later years and death ==
The closing item in the April 3, 1974 column by The New York Times advertising writer Philip H. Dougherty mentioned that Kirchner was "very happy with the living he's making" doing commercial voice-overs. Six years later, the lead item published in the February 11, 1980, Kirchner's 64th birthday, column by The New York Times food writer Craig Claiborne, informed that he "recently received a note from an old acquaintance, Claude Kirchner" who wrote that "My mother grew up in Russia" and "we always celebrated Russian Easter with traditional foods and customs."

During the nearly forty years that Kirchner spent in the New York City media market after leaving Chicago media in late 1955, he lived in Greenwich, Connecticut. On March 8, 1993, four weeks past his 77th birthday, he died from lymphoma at a hospice in Hawthorne, New York. He was divorced from his first wife, Ruth Ross, and was survived by his second wife, Marilyn Friedel Klein, son Tim and daughter Lynn who has contributed memory pieces about her father.

== Sources ==
- Virgintino, Michael R. Freedomland U.S.A.: The Definitive History (Theme Park Press, 2019)
