= Svingin' with Svend =

Live album by David Grisman, Svend Asmussen
- Released: 1987
- Recorded: November 5–9, 1986 at Fat Tuesday's, New York City
- Genre: Jazz
- Length: 37:46
- Label: Zebra
- Producer: David Grisman, Craig Miller

David Grisman chronology
Acousticity (1984)	Svingin' with Svend (1987)	Home Is Where the Heart Is (1988)

Svend Asmussen chronology

Professional ratings
Review scores
Source	Rating
Allmusic	4.5/5 stars

Svingin' with Svend is an album by American musician David Grisman and Danish musician Svend Asmussen, released in 1987. It is attributed to the David Grisman Quintet featuring Svend Asmussen.

All songs were recorded live with the exception of "Lap-Nils Polska" and "Jitterbug Waltz", which were recorded at Bay View Studios in Richmond, California in 1987. "It Don't Mean a Thing" and "Spirit Feel" were not included on the initial LP release.

In an interview with Mandozine, Grisman stated: "That album comprised both live and studio cuts. The live material was recorded at a week-long engagement at Fat Tuesdays, a jazz club in NYC that Stan Getz's son Steve managed. Les Paul used to play there every Monday night. One night during the engagement Toots came by and Svend invited him to sit in. I believe we played Milt Jackson's "Spirit Feel" which is included on the CD version (not the LP). It was very exciting to be a part of that meeting of two very kindred spirits and long-time friends."

== Track listing ==
1. "Svingin' with Svend" (David Grisman) – 4:02
2. "Nadja" (Svend Asmussen) – 6:24
3. "Lap-Nils' Polska" (Traditional, arr. Asmussen) – 8:24
4. "It Don't Mean a Thing" – 6:35
5. "Swing Mineur" (Django Reinhardt, Stéphane Grappelli) – 6:38
6. "Jitterbug Waltz" (Fats Waller) – 6:20
7. "The Spirit-Feel" (Milt Jackson) – 9:29
8. "Nuages" (Reinhardt) – 6:02

== Personnel ==
- David Grisman – mandolin
- Svend Asmussen – violin
- Dimitri Vandellos – guitar
- James Kerwin – double bass
- George Marsh – drums, percussion, kalimba

Production notes:

- David Grisman – producer, mixing
- Craig Miller – producer, engineer
- Bob Shumaker – engineer
- Paul Stubbelbine – engineer
- Tom Anderson – engineer
- Greg Fulginiti – mastering
- Rhonda Voo – cover illustration
- Thomas Boss – photography

== Chart positions ==
Chart (1988)	Position
Billboard Jazz Albums	10
