= Sara Davis Buechner =

American concert pianist and educator

Sara Davis Buechner (born 1959) is an American concert pianist and educator currently based in Newark, New Jersey.

== Early life and education ==
Buechner was born in Baltimore, Maryland in 1959. She studied music with Veronika Wolf Cohen, Reynaldo Reyes, and Mieczyslaw Münz, before graduating high school at Friends School of Baltimore in 1976. She attended the Juilliard School as a pupil of Czech pianist Rudolf Firkusny and later worked with both Byron Janis and Paul Badura-Skoda.

== Career ==
In her twenties, Buechner won major prizes at the Queen Elisabeth of Belgium International Piano Competition (1983), the Leeds International Piano Competition (1984), the Tchaikovsky International Piano Competition (bronze medal 1986), and the Gina Bachauer International Piano Competition (1984, gold medal). Her 1984 debut at the 92nd Street Y in New York City received a glowing review in The New York Times, and she has had an active performance career since that time.

Buechner holds the German Diez Memorial Piano Chair of the Greenwich House Music School in New York City. She has been a professor of piano at Temple University since 2016, and previously served on the faculties of the University of British Columbia, the Manhattan School of Music and New York University. She was also an honorary Professor of the University of Shanghai from 2013 to 2016. She has edited books and music scores for Dover Publications, where she was chief music editor from 2009 to 2012.

Buechner has performed with numerous major orchestras throughout North and South America, Asia, and Europe, with an active repertoire of more than 100 concerti, and has given master classes on four continents.

Buechner is a Yamaha Artist, and has made many recordings for the Disklavier player system.

== Personal life ==
A transgender woman, Buechner has given talks and written candidly about her journey of transition and her role as an advocate and role model within the LGBTQ community. In a 2013 New York Times article, Buechner openly shared her deeply personal experience of transitioning from male to female and reflected on the challenges and transformations that shaped both her identity and her musical career.

== Discography ==
- Mujeres Españolas – Piano Works of Joaquin Turina (1992)
- The American Flute (1993) (with flutist Robert Stallman)
- Henry Martin: Preludes and Fugues (1990–92) (1994)
- Mozart: Piano Sonatas (1995)
- The Paradine Case – Hollywood Piano Concertos (1995)
- Bach-Busoni "Goldberg" Variations (1997)
- Miklos Rozsa: Complete Works for Solo Piano (1999)
- Stephen Foster: Complete Piano Works (2002)
- Rudolf Friml: Piano Music (2003)
- Bygone Days – Music for Violin and Piano by Rudolf Friml (2006) (with violinist Stephanie Chase)
- George Gershwin – Original Works and Transcriptions for Solo Piano (2005)
- Nineteen Rags of Joseph Lamb
- Variations and Other Works of Brahms and Dvorak
- Works of Busoni and Stravinsky
- Gershwin: Second Rhapsody/Addinsell: "Warsaw" Concerto
- Tchaikovsky: Piano Concerto No. 1, op. 23
