= Jon Sholle =

American musical artist (1948–2018)

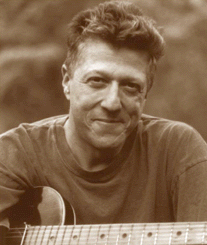

Background information
- Born: Jonathan T Sholle; March 13, 1948
- Origin: New York City, New York, USA
- Died: May 17, 2018 (aged 70)
- Genres: Rock, bluegrass, country, roots music, blues
- Occupations: Musician, producer
- Instruments: Guitar, banjo, electric guitar, mandolin, mandola, double bass, electric bass, lap steel, resonator guitar, dobro
- Years active: 1964 – 2018
- Label: Rounder
- Formerly of: David Grisman Quintet

Jon Sholle (March 13, 1948 – May 17, 2018) was an American guitarist, multi-instrumentalist, and musician who played bluegrass, rock, country, roots music, and folk music.

== As musician ==
Sholle was born in 1948 in New York City. While he started playing professionally as early as high school, over his 40+ year career, Sholle worked with such musicians as Vassar Clements, David Grisman, Peter Rowan, Tony Rice, Larry Campbell, Keith Carradine, Allen Ginsberg, Bela Fleck, and Bette Midler. In 1969, Sholle played a number of string instruments for beat poet Allen Ginsberg's 1970 LP Songs of Innocence and Experience, a musical adaptation of William Blake's poetry collection of the same name.

From 1984 to 1986, he was a member of the David Grisman Quintet and was featured on their album Acousticity, which made No. 6 on Billboard's Jazz chart. Sholle also released two solo albums with Rounder Records, Catfish for Supper and Out of the Frying Pan. He was featured on Andy Statman's 2011 release on the Shefa label, "Old Brooklyn", playing Guitar (Acoustic), Guitar (Electric), Guitar (Steel), and Lap Steel Guitar.

== As producer ==
Working with film director Ethan Wiley, Sholle produced Wiley's instrumental CD "Take a Stand" and composed and performed two instrumental songs for the soundtrack to the 2001 horror movie Jason X and Don Knowlton's 2000 short "Bad Assassin". He also contributed music to the "Elf-Man" soundtrack, also directed by Wiley. He compiled and wrote the liner notes for the 1996 Rounder Records compilation Rounder Bluegrass Guitar, as well as self-producing the two albums he released through Rounder.

== On stage and film ==
Sholle appeared in the 1979 film The Rose as a member of Midler's band, as well appearing on-screen and playing on the soundtrack for the Peter Bogdanovitch-directed Audrey Hepburn movie They All Laughed, and playing dobro on the soundtrack for Disney's The Rookie, starring Dennis Quaid. He has also appeared in several Broadway shows, including The Best Little Whorehouse in Texas and Big River.

== Awards and honors ==
Sholle won both the 1967 and 1968 "World Champion Guitar" at the Union Grove Fiddler's convention in North Carolina.
