= Ladies Be Seated =

American radio game show

- Genre: Game show
- Running time: 30 minutes
- Country of origin: United States
- Language: English
- Home station: WJZ
- Syndicates: Blue Network; ABC
- TV adaptations: Ladies Be Seated
- Hosted by: Ed East; Polly East; Johnny Olson; Penny Olson; Tom Moore
- Announcer: Claude Kirchner; Ed Roberts
- Directed by: Billy Redford; Charles Acree
- Produced by: Billy Redford; Phil Patton; Tom Hargis
- Original release: June 4, 1943 – July 21, 1950
- Sponsored by: Aunt Jemima pancake flour Muffets breakfast cereal Toni home permanents

Ladies Be Seated is an American old-time radio game show. It was broadcast on the Blue Network from June 4, 1943, to June 23, 1944, and on ABC from June 26, 1944, to July 21, 1950. At its peak in popularity, it was carried on 198 stations. Two versions were televised: one in 1945 and the other in 1949.

== Personnel ==
Ed East and his wife, Polly, were the original hosts. They were joined by singers Lee Sullivan and Murray Grabhorn.

When the Easts left the program, Johnny Olson and his wife, Penny, became the hosts on June 27, 1944. He wore "a glittering minstrel costume" in his new role. Penny Olson was both co-host and associate producer, responsible for developing stunts, selecting participants, and obtaining prizes for the show — she was known on the program as "Million Dollar Penny". Billy Redford portrayed Professor Schnaaps, and Bob Mauer was the announcer. Al Greiner directed the music. Directors included Redford and Charles Acree. Producers included Redford and Phil Patton.

On September 15, 1947, Tom Moore replaced the Olsons as host of the program. His co-workers included announcers Claude Kirchner and Ed Roberts, producer Tom Hargis, organist Porter Heaps, and director Patton.

== Format ==
Originating from WJZ in New York City, Ladies Be Seated began as a spoof of radio programs that provided household hints for women. It initially featured "blindfold husband-and-wife gags, spaghetti-eating contests, and other forms of audio slapstick". The version hosted by the Olsons included identifying songs, recognizing good deeds, and interviews with children.

== Popularity ==
In addition to the radio audience, approximately 600 people were present for each broadcast in the program's studios. During one month of broadcasts from Chicago, the program received more than 33,000 requests for tickets, some from people as far as 900 miles (1,400 km) away. Many who attended were on honeymoons, on vacations, or at conventions. Thousands more attended personal appearances when the show went on the road to cities across the United States. During the Illinois State Fair in August 1947, "the millionth lady was seated".

== Sponsors ==
On June 18, 1945, Ladies Be Seated began to be sponsored by Aunt Jemima Pancake Flour and Muffets breakfast cereal. By December 1947, Toni home permanents had become a sponsor.

== Television ==
Two versions of Ladies Be Seated were televised. Olson was host of the first version, which was broadcast on WRGB in Schenectady, New York. The February 27, 1945, broadcast was the Blue Network's first venture into television. Moore and Phil Patton were hosts of the second version, which was on ABC from April 22, 1949, until June 17, 1949.
