= 1968 Democratic National Convention protests =

Anti-Vietnam War protests and resulting Chicago police reaction

- Part of the 1968 U.S. presidential election, the protests of 1968, opposition to the Vietnam War and political violence in the United States during the Cold War
- Chicago police drag an anti-Vietnam war protester across Michigan Avenue on August 28, 1968, during the Democratic National Convention as the crowd chants "The whole world is watching".
- Date: August 23–29, 1968
- Location: Chicago, Illinois
- Caused by: Opposition to United States involvement in the Vietnam War, racism in the United States, poverty

Parties
Protesters: Youth International Party; National Mobilization Committee to End the War in Vietnam; Students for a Democratic Society; Women Strike for Peace; Southern Christian Leadership Conference	Democratic Party; Federal and state security forces: Chicago Police Department; US Army National Guard; Illinois National Guard; Federal Bureau of Investigation; United States Secret Service

Lead figures
Abbie Hoffman; Jerry Rubin; Rennie Davis; Tom Hayden; David Dellinger	Richard J. Daley

Number
7,000–10,000	23,000

Casualties
- Deaths: 1 civilian killed
- Injuries: 500+ protesters 100+ other civilians 152 police officers

A series of protests against the United States' involvement in the Vietnam War took place prior to and during the 1968 Democratic National Convention in Chicago, Illinois. The protests lasted approximately seven days, from August 23 to August 29, 1968, and drew an estimated 7,000 to 10,000 anti-war protesters in total.

In the weeks after the 1967 March on the Pentagon, many left-wing counterculture and anti-Vietnam War groups, as well as supporters of anti-war Democratic presidential candidate Eugene McCarthy, began planning demonstrations in response to the Democratic National Convention and the impending presidential nomination of Democratic nominee, Vice President Hubert Humphrey. Chicago authorities attempted to prevent the protests from occurring but were unsuccessful, and the city promised "law and order" to suppress the protesters.

Despite the small size of the protests, many demonstrators, reporters, and bystanders were met with unprecedented levels of police brutality and violence by the Chicago Police Department, particularly in Grant Park and Michigan Avenue during the convention. The actions by Chicago police, the Illinois National Guard, and other law enforcement agencies were later described by the National Commission on the Causes and Prevention of Violence as a "police riot".

During the evening of August 28, 1968, with the police riot occurring on Michigan Avenue in front of the Democratic Party's convention headquarters and the Conrad Hilton hotel, television networks broadcast live as the anti-war protesters began the now-iconic chant: "The whole world is watching".

== Planning ==
=== National Mobilization Committee to End the War in Vietnam ===
Following the March on the Pentagon in October 1967 which drew 100,000 protesters, David Dellinger's National Mobilization Committee to End the War in Vietnam (often referred to as "MOBE") proposed a massive anti-war demonstration to coincide with the 1968 Democratic National Convention. In early 1968, the National Mobilization Committee opened a Chicago office directed by Rennie Davis and Tom Hayden, who were leading political organizers at the time and former leaders of Students for a Democratic Society.

MOBE was an umbrella organization that included groups who were opposed to American participation in the Vietnam War. MOBE was run by a small executive board that set up a general framework for mass demonstrations, sent out invitations to the over 500 groups on its mailing lists, and coordinated activities between the groups.

MOBE recognized and supported all tactics from marching to civil disobedience. MOBE's main aim was to get the largest turnouts at its functions. David Dellinger, MOBE chairman, believed that "the tendency to intensify militancy without organizing wide political support [was] self-defeating. But so [was] the tendency to draw way from militancy into milder and more conventional forms of protest."

For Chicago, MOBE originally planned for two large-scale marches and an end-of-convention rally at Soldier Field. The goal was originally a massive show of force outside the International Amphitheatre. MOBE also planned to have workshops and movement centers distributed in 10 parks throughout the city, many in predominantly black areas, to allow demonstrators and participating groups to follow their particular focuses.

=== Youth International Party ===
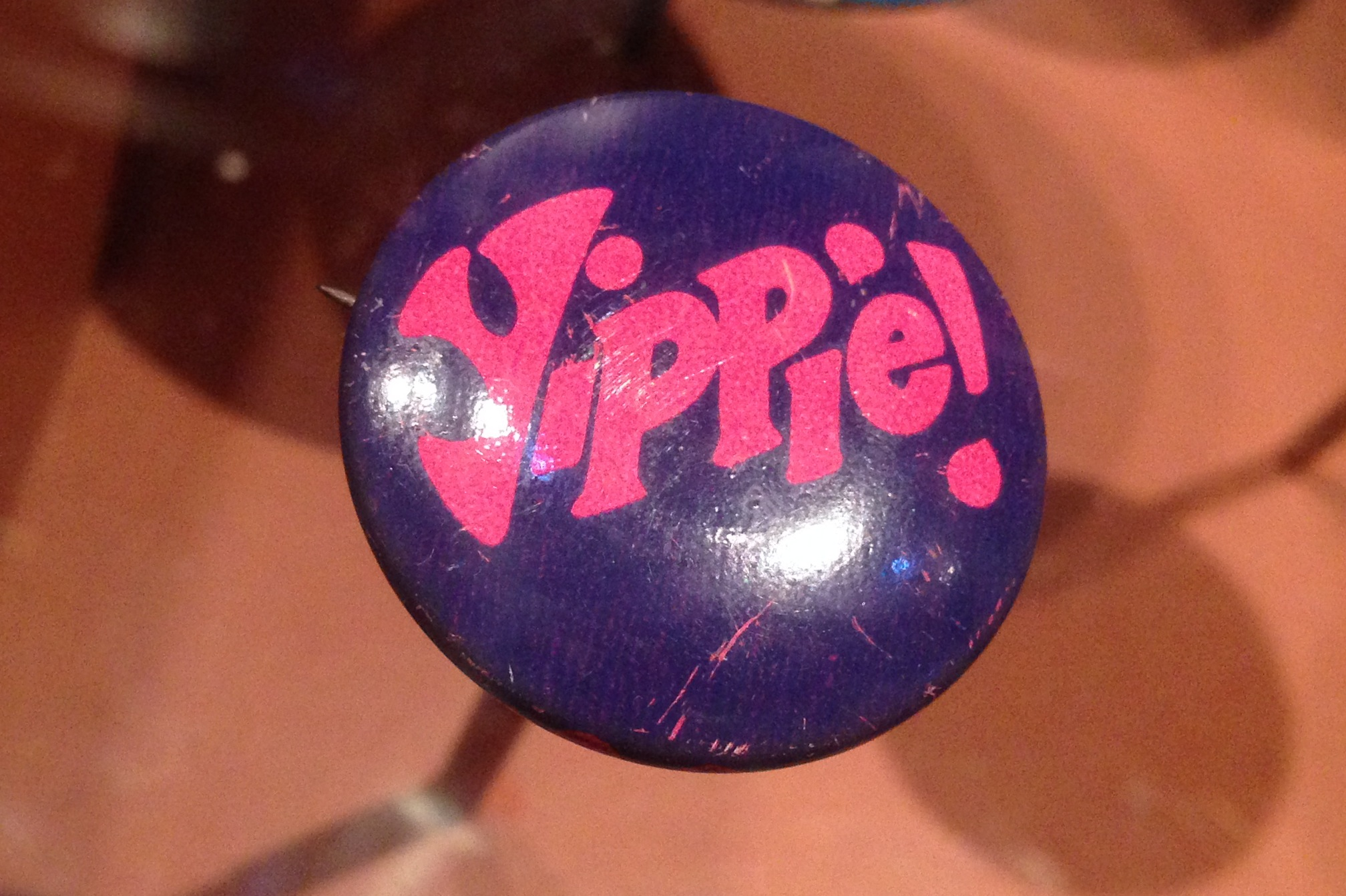
Yippie! button on display at the Chicago History Museum

The Youth International Party was one of the major groups in the organization of the protests. Abbie Hoffman, Jerry Rubin, and a few friends engaged in conversation at Hoffman's apartment on New Year's Eve, 1967. They discussed the events of the year, such as the Summer of Love and the Pentagon demonstration. The idea of having a free music festival in Chicago was suggested to defuse political tension. Over the next week, the Youth International Party took shape. Its members, known as "Yippies" politicized hippie ideology and used street theater and other tactics to critique the culture of the United States and induce change.

In preparation for the Chicago convention, the Yippies held the "Yip-In", and the "Yip-Out" at Grand Central Station in New York City. Both events were planned simply as Human Be-In, with live music. The event was used to promote peace, love and harmony, and as a trial run for Chicago. The black banner of an anarchist group was hung on the wall, bearing the words, "Up Against the Wall Mother Fucker" in red. Police stood by watching the crowds. As the "Yip-In" progressed, relations between the police and Yippies became strained. Two people climbed a large clock and removed the hands; the police responded by clearing the station. They formed a skirmish line, ordered the people to disperse, and then started forcing their way through the crowd.

The "Yip-Out" was similar in purpose but held in Central Park. To obtain the permits and aid from New York City officials necessary for the event, Yippies performed a sit-in at the mayor's office until the Mayor would negotiate on permits. In the end, an agreement was made on staging, electricity, police presence, bathrooms, and other necessities for running a music festival. Police milled in the crowd giving considerable leeway to the proceedings which led to a peaceable day.

The Yippies took a radical approach to the Democratic National Convention. They wrote articles, published fliers, made speeches and held rallies and demonstrations, to announce that they were coming to Chicago. Threats were made that nails would be thrown from overpasses to block roads; cars would be used to block intersections, main streets, police stations and National Guard armories; LSD would be dumped in the city's water supply and the convention would be stormed. However, none of these threats came to fruition. Nonetheless, city officials in Chicago prepared for all possible threats. A vilification campaign led by Chicago authorities worked in favor of the Yippies' plan.

One of the Yippies' main tactics was to use street theatre to create an experience that drew the attention of mainstream America. Yippie activities were used to put across the message that the average American didn't have control over the political process. They tried to show this by purposefully participating in non-traditional activities that would not conceivably affect the decision-making process in the convention hall, unlike a "straight" protest with picket lines, marches, and rallies which could conceivably convince delegates of mass support for a program. On a Wednesday night, networks moved their coverage away from the Amphitheater where the delegates were voting on the nomination, to a "pitched battle" in front of the Conrad Hilton hotel.

== Prelude ==
=== Official responses ===
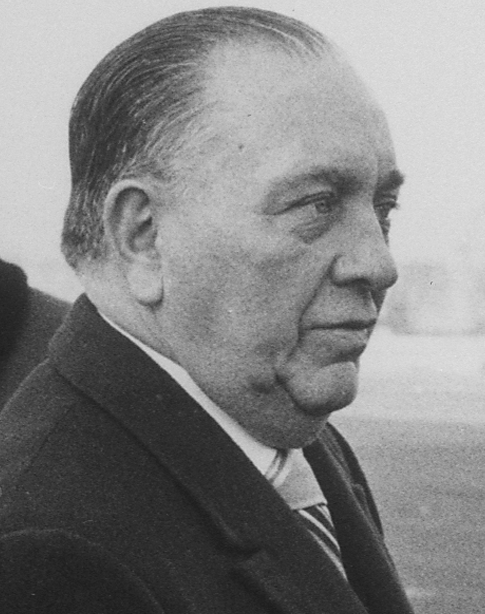
Mayor Richard J. Daley

In the buildup to the convention and amid tensions following the 1968 Chicago riots, Mayor Richard J. Daley repeatedly denounced the various anti–Vietnam War protest groups mobilizing for demonstrations and declared, “Law and order will be maintained.

Chicago's security forces prepared for the protests during the convention. Besides the standard gun and billy club, Chicago Police Department officers had mace and riot helmets. For the convention, the CPD borrowed a new portable communications system from the military, thus increasing communication between field officers and command posts. All summer long, police officers had received refresher training on crowd control and riot techniques. During the convention itself, Police Academy instructors were with the reserve forces, giving last-minute reminders.

Mayor Daley, citing intelligence reports of potential violence, put the 12,000 members of the Chicago Police Department on twelve-hour shifts, while the U.S. Army placed 6,000 troops in position to protect the city during the convention and nearly 6,000 members of the National Guard were sent to the city, with an additional 5,000 National Guard on alert, bolstered by up to 1,000 FBI and military intelligence officers, and 1,000 Secret Service agents.

To satisfy manpower requirements, the City put the force on 12-hour shifts, instead of the normal 8-hour shifts. This gave police commanders approximately 50% more field officers to deal with disturbances. Two-thirds of the officers would continue with the normal police duties with the remaining third available for special assignment. In the Amphitheatre, the City concentrated 500 officers filling various roles. In Lincoln Park, the number of officers patrolling during the daytime was doubled, but the majority of the officers assigned to the Lincoln Park area were held in reserve, ready to respond to any disturbance.

In suspected trouble areas, police patrols were heavy. Further away from the center patrols were less frequent. This allowed the police to shift easily and quickly to control a problem without leaving an area unguarded. While maintaining a public image of total enforcement of all city, state, and federal laws, the Narcotics division was quietly reassigned to regular fieldwork, curtailing anti-drug operations during the DNC.

Police officials and Mayor Daley had worked with the National Guard to create a plan to use the Guard effectively. It would be called up at the beginning of the convention, but held in reserve at strategically placed armories or collection points such as Soldier Field. With the Guard in place at their armories, the CPD could request and receive assistance quickly.

=== Permits ===
Both MOBE and Yippie needed permits from the city to hold their respective events. The city had several reasons for denying permits to MOBE and Yippie and thus stalled issuing permits. The city was worried about a black rebellion, independent of the white protesters, during the convention. To avoid trouble, the City used its influence with black community organizations such as The Woodlawn Organization, the Black Consortium, and Operation Breadbasket to try to keep their constituents calm and peaceful. Some of the militant black leaders were encouraged to leave town during the convention to avoid being implicated in any violence.

The city also believed that having large numbers of white protesters marching through the black ghettos with a heavy police or National Guard escort would inflame the ghettos and set off rioting. Therefore, the City categorically denied any permit that included parks in or march routes through black areas.

Another argument the City used to deny permits was that the permits asked the city to set aside local and state ordinances. A city ordinance closed the city parks at 11 p.m., although this was not strictly enforced. In a letter to Yippie, Deputy Mayor David Stahl gave eight rules for Yippie to follow, including submitting detailed plans and requirements, following all city, state, and federal ordinances, and toning down the rhetoric. The Yippies refused, so the City felt justified in denying Yippie their permits.

In a last-ditch effort, MOBE filed a lawsuit in federal court seeking it to force Chicago to issue permits for a rally in Soldier Field or Grant Park. Judge Lynch, Daley's former law partner, heard the case, and summarily dismissed the request, citing that the city could deny permits on the basis of protecting "public comfort, convenience, and welfare".

== Protests ==
=== August 22: Shooting of Dean Johnson ===
Although Chicago authorities and the media had anticipated 100,000 anti-war protesters to converge on Chicago during the week of the 1968 Democratic National Convention, an estimated 9,000 to 10,000 protesters arrived in the city on August 22–23 to participate in the demonstrations. As the demonstrators arrived in the city, 23,000 police and National Guardsmen assembled in response.

The week's violence began with the shooting and killing of Dean Johnson by Chicago police officers. Dean Johnson, age 17, and another boy were stopped on the sidewalk by the officers for a curfew violation early on the morning of Thursday, August 22. When Johnson drew and fired a pistol at police (the gun misfired), police officers returned fire, hitting Johnson three times. The Yippies and SDS hastily organized a memorial service for Johnson, but as one observer noted, due to poor planning "it turned out that no one had made any plans to actually do anything. We just milled around and began to fill up the intersection. Two squad cars pulled up and the cops got out and told us to keep moving ... but they were pretty gentle about it".

=== August 23: Planned protests ===
On Friday, August 23, Jerry Rubin and 50 Yippies attempted to formally nominate the Yippie candidate for president, Pigasus, a 150-pound pig that they had transported to the Civic Center plaza in an old station wagon. By the time Rubin arrived with Pigasus, 200 spectators had gathered on the Civic Center plaza. Police officers were waiting, and after the pig was released, Rubin, folk singer Phil Ochs, and five other Yippies were arrested. The remaining Yippies proceeded to the police headquarters at 11th and State streets to protest the arrests.

=== August 24: Marches ===
A speaker with a megaphone addresses a crowd of protesters in Grant Park

At 6 a.m. on Saturday, August 24, continuous surveillance began in Lincoln Park. On previous nights, the police had cleared Lincoln Park at 11 p.m. and maintained a significant presence during the day. Women Strike for Peace attempted to hold a women-only picket at the Hilton Hotel, the main delegate hotel. Despite plans for buses from around the country to bring hundreds of picketers, only 60 or so women showed up.

At 10:30 p.m., the Yippies had built a bonfire near the southern area of Lincoln Park, and armed police soon confronted them. As protesters generally agreed not to attempt to stay in Lincoln Park after the curfew but to take the protest to the streets, poet Allen Ginsberg led 250 protesters out of the park at 11 p.m. and towards North Avenue. While 75 policemen and 4 police cars barred any reentrance to Lincoln Park, SDS leaders organized several hundred protesters to march through the streets chanting things such as "Peace Now". When the crowd stopped at Wells and North Avenue, blocking the intersection, a police contingent arrived and cleared the crowd. Eleven people were arrested on charges of disorderly conduct, and several police vehicles were stoned before the crowd dispersed into the normal Saturday nightlife.

=== August 25: Protests and music ===
Anti-war demonstrators in Lincoln Park, Chicago on August 25. The band MC5 can be seen playing

On Sunday, MOBE had scheduled a 'Meet the Delegates' march and picket. At 2 p.m. there were between 200 and 300 picketers marching across the street from the Conrad Hilton, and another 500 marching south through the Loop chanting, "Hey, Hey LBJ, how many kids did you kill today". After the police arrival, those who were picketing moved into nearby Grant Park to avoid a mass arrest situation. Once the marchers had reached Grant Park, there was a brief rally where Davis and Hayden claimed the day a success and then went to Lincoln Park where the Festival of Life music festival was beginning.

At 4 p.m., the Festival started with proto-punk band MC5, the only band who showed up for the festival. The police did not allow a flatbed truck to be brought in as a stage, fearing Yippies would use it to incite the crowd. When the concession stand owner insisted that Yippie stop using his electrical outlets to run the amplification equipment, confusion ensued. While Rubin and other Yippies tried to make frantic deals to get the sound back on, Hoffman used the confusion to try to bring in the flatbed truck. A deal was struck allowing the truck to be parked nearby, but not in, the park. The crowd gathered around and on the truck did not realize an agreement had been reached and thought the truck was being sent away. The crowd surged around the truck, pinning in the police officers.

Hoffman declared that the police had stopped the music festival, and proceeded to conduct a workshop on dispersal tactics to avoid arrest by police. As the next police shift came on duty, they were informed of the tense situation in the park. Due to the number, frequency, diverseness, and exposure of the threats made by the protesters, the police were concerned about facing protesters armed with unknown weapons and unknown intentions.

At 9 p.m., police formed a skirmish line around the park bathrooms. This drew a crowd of spectators who heckled the police. The crowd rapidly grew until the police charged into the crowd swinging their batons, scattering the crowd. At 11 p.m., the police pushed the protesters out of the park. Most protesters left the park and congregated nearby, taunting the police.

Initially, when the police reached the edge of the park, they maintained their skirmish line. However, when a squad was ordered to 'clear' Clark Street to keep traffic flowing, the police lost control. A running battle began. Yippie Jerry Rubin told a friend, "This is fantastic and it's only Sunday night. They might declare martial law in this town." Protesters, journalists, photographers, and bystanders were clubbed and beaten by the police. Order was not restored in Old Town until early Monday morning.

=== August 26: Grant Park ===
Protesters climb the General John Logan Memorial in Grant Park as demonstrations occur in the area.

On Monday, August 26, demonstrators climbed on the General John Logan Memorial statue, leading to violent skirmishes with police in Grant Park. Police hauled a young man down and arrested him, breaking his arm in the process. Protestors chanted “kill the pigs” as the skirmishes with police unfolded.

=== August 28: The Battle for Michigan Avenue ===
In the early morning hours of August 28, 5,000 protesters had congregated in front of the Conrad Hilton hotel, which served as the convention headquarters, and across the street in Grant Park. At 2:15 a.m., Mayor Daley ordered 800 national guardsmen of the 33rd military police battalion to confront them. The national guardsmen had been billeted at Soldier Field and in the armory building awaiting these very instructions. Donning battle gear, the guardsmen proceeded to Michigan Avenue and positioned themselves between the Conrad Hilton hotel and the protesters in Grant Park.

While this stand-off occurred at Grant Park, 200 Chicago policemen used tear gas and dump trucks as improvised tanks to disperse protesters at Lincoln Park. Among these protesters were 50 members of the Black Panthers. By this time, protesters were joined on 28 August by the Poor People's Campaign, now led by the Southern Christian Leadership Conference's Ralph Abernathy. This group had a permit and was split off from other demonstrators before being allowed to proceed to the amphitheater.

When protesters at Grant Park eventually attempted to cross Michigan Avenue and storm the Conrad Hilton hotel, a 17-minute melee ensued, later known as "The Battle of Michigan Avenue." Reporters broadcast footage of the melee on television, along with footage from the floor of the convention. Reporters estimated the crowd at 9,000 anti-war demonstrators, while police estimated 7,000 persons. The police violence extended to encompass protesters, bystanders, reporters and photographers, while tear gas reached Hubert Humphrey in his hotel suite. Police pushed protesters through plate-glass windows, then pursued them inside and beat them as they sprawled on the broken glass. 100 protesters and 119 police officers were treated for injuries, and 600 protesters were arrested. Television cameras recorded the police brutality while demonstrators chanted "The whole world is watching".

At the convention, several Democratic delegates made statements against Mayor Daley and the CPD, such as Senator Abraham Ribicoff who, speaking from the podium, denounced the use of "Gestapo tactics on the streets of Chicago" in his speech nominating George McGovern. The hard line taken by the city was also seen on the convention floor itself. In 1968, Terry Southern described the convention hall as "exactly like approaching a military installation; barbed-wire, checkpoints, the whole bit". Inside the convention, journalists such as Mike Wallace and Dan Rather were roughed up by security; both these events were broadcast live on television. Humphrey won the presidential nomination that night.

=== August 29: Ain't Marchin' Any More ===
Paul Cowan of The Village Voice reports that after a speech by Eugene McCarthy in Grant Park that afternoon, a march was joined by delegates and McCarthy supporters but was stopped at 18th Street and Michigan Avenue by the National Guard. Arrests were followed by tear gas and mace, while marchers chanted "The whole world is watching" and retreated to Grant Park. In the park, demonstrators sang God Bless America, This Land Is Your Land, and The Star-Spangled Banner, and waved "V" symbols above their heads, asking soldiers to join in. They never did. Phil Ochs sang "I Ain't Marchin' Any More", and demonstrators chanted "join us" softly. Five hours later, police officers raided a party organized by McCarthy workers in the Hilton hotel, and beat them viciously. According to the McCarthy workers, all telephones on their floor had been disconnected a half hour before, and they had no way to call for help.

== Aftermath ==
=== Investigations ===
The city of Chicago, the U.S. Department of Justice, the House Committee on Un-American Activities, and the presidentially appointed National Commission on the Causes and Prevention of Violence all responded with investigations of the violence. Within days, the Daley administration issued the first report, blaming the violence on "outside agitators", described as "revolutionaries" who came to Chicago "for the avowed purpose of a hostile confrontation with law enforcement". The Department of Justice report, however, found no grounds for prosecution of demonstrators, and Attorney General Ramsey Clark asked the U.S. attorney in Chicago to investigate possible civil rights violations by Chicago police.

In Mayor Daley's report, a list of 152 officers wounded in Wednesday's melee was presented. Their wounds ranged from an officer's split fingernail to an officer's infra-orbital fracture of the left eye. Although the precise number of injured protesters is unknown, Dr. Quentin Young of the Medical Committee for Human Rights (MCHR) stated that most of the approximately 500 people treated in the streets suffered from minor injuries and the effects of tear gas. During the entirety of convention week, 101 civilians were treated for undisclosed injuries, by area hospitals, 45 of those on Wednesday night.

On September 4, 1968, Milton Eisenhower, chair of the National Commission on the Causes and Prevention of Violence, announced that the commission would investigate the violence at the Chicago convention and report its findings to President Lyndon Johnson. A Chicago lawyer, Daniel Walker, headed the team of over 200 members, who interviewed more than 1,400 witnesses and studied FBI reports and film of the confrontations. The report was released on December 1, 1968, characterized the convention violence as a "police riot" and recommended prosecution of police who used indiscriminate violence; the report made clear that the vast majority of police had behaved responsibly, but also said that a failure to prosecute would further damage public confidence in law enforcement. The commission's Walker Report, named after its chair Daniel Walker, acknowledged that demonstrators had provoked the police and responded with violence of their own, but found that the "vast majority of the demonstrators were intent on expressing by peaceful means their dissent".

=== Public response ===
The American national news media, whose correspondents had been among the victims of police brutality at the convention, were at the forefront of criticism of the Chicago police. According to journalist Barbara Ehrenreich: "In a rare moment of collective courage, the editors of all the nation's major newspapers telegrammed a strong protest to Mayor Daley." National NBC newscaster Chet Huntley announced to the nation on the evening news that "'the news profession in this city is now under assault by the Chicago police'."

To the surprise of the news media, and many of the people who had witnessed the Chicago "police riot", the general public did not take their side. "Polls taken immediately after the convention showed that the majority of Americans – 56 percent – sympathized with the police, not with the bloodied demonstrators or the press." A poll taken for The New York Times "showed an 'overwhelming' majority respondents supported the police in Chicago." CBS reported that 10 times as many people had written to them disapproving of their coverage of the events as had written in approval. Daley himself received "scores of letters", praising him and especially attacking the press and demonstrators.

One aftereffect of this "backlash" was soul-searching by the "media class" who "spent the next few years" in "almost reverent" examination of the white working class/middle class, mostly non-coastal strata of population dubbed "the silent majority" (by soon-to-be-president Richard Nixon) and "Middle America".

=== Chicago 7 trial ===
On March 20, 1969, several months after the convention (and after a new more conservative president, Richard Nixon was in office), a federal grand jury announced the indictments of eight demonstrators—Rennie Davis, David Dellinger, John Froines, Tom Hayden, Abbie Hoffman, Jerry Rubin, and Lee Weiner (plus Bobby Seale who was tried separately)—and eight police officers. The jury delivered a verdict on February 18, 1970.

The trial "illuminated the deepening schisms in a country torn apart by the Vietnam War, tectonic cultural shifts and attempts by the Nixon Administration to quash peaceful antiwar dissent and protest". The trial, the defendants, and their attorneys gained much publicity and were depicted during and after the trial in a variety of art forms, including film, music, and theater. Indignity, theater and hijinks during the event included presiding Judge Julius Hoffman ordering Bobby Seale to be bound, gagged, and chained to a chair, for refusing to obey the Judge's contempt citations. Abbie Hoffman standing up and blowing the jury a kiss after his name was mentioned, and later wrestling with a deputy marshal who was trying to remove a Viet Cong flag Hoffman had brought into the courtroom; Abbie Hoffman and Rubin wearing judicial robes to court, and removing them on the judge's orders to reveal blue policeman's uniforms underneath, then throwing the robes on the ground and stepping on them.

Over 100 witnesses were called by the defense, including singers Phil Ochs, Judy Collins, Arlo Guthrie, and Country Joe McDonald; comedian Dick Gregory; writers Norman Mailer and Allen Ginsberg; and activists Timothy Leary and Jesse Jackson.

All of the defendants were charged with and acquitted of conspiracy; Davis, Dellinger, Hayden, Hoffman, and Rubin were charged with and convicted of crossing state lines with intent to incite a riot; Froines and Weiner were charged with teaching demonstrators how to construct incendiary devices and acquitted of those charges. While the jury deliberated on the verdict for the remaining defendants, Judge Hoffman convicted all the defendants—and their attorneys William Kunstler and Leonard Weinglass—on a total of 159 counts of criminal contempt, and sentenced them to jail sentences ranging from less than three months to more than four years.

On May 11, 1972, the panel dismissed some contempt charges against the lawyers, and reversed all of the other contempt convictions for retrial with a different judge. On November 21, 1972, all of the criminal convictions were reversed by a United States Court of Appeals for the Seventh Circuit panel.

Seven police officers were charged with assault and one police officer was charged with perjury, all were acquitted or had their case dismissed.

== Gallery ==
Chicago Police outside the Conrad Hilton.

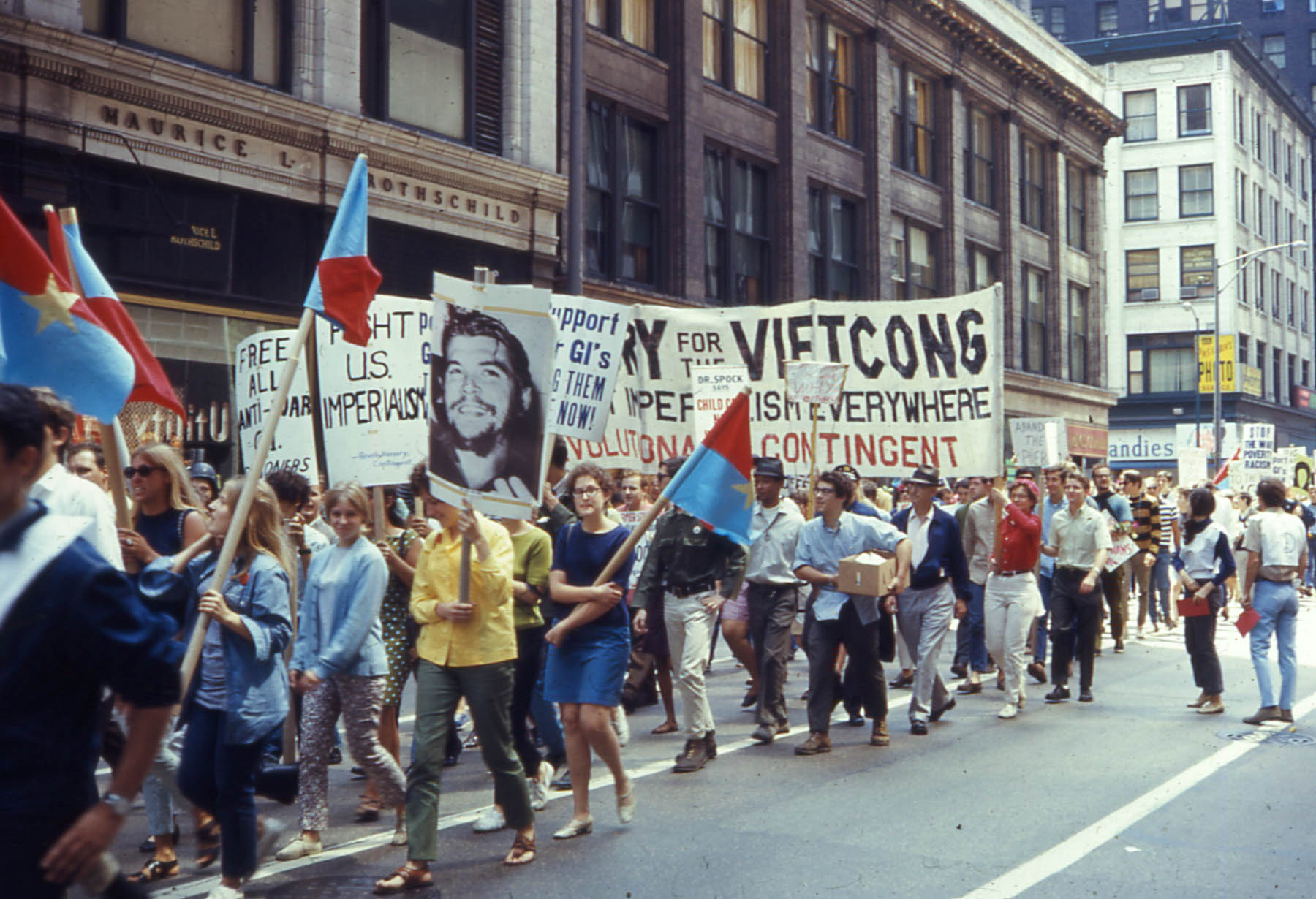
This demonstration took place on August 10, 1968, as Chicago was preparing to host the Democratic National Convention.

Illinois National Guard troops in downtown Chicago by the Central Station.

Illinois National guard troops off of Michigan Avenue.

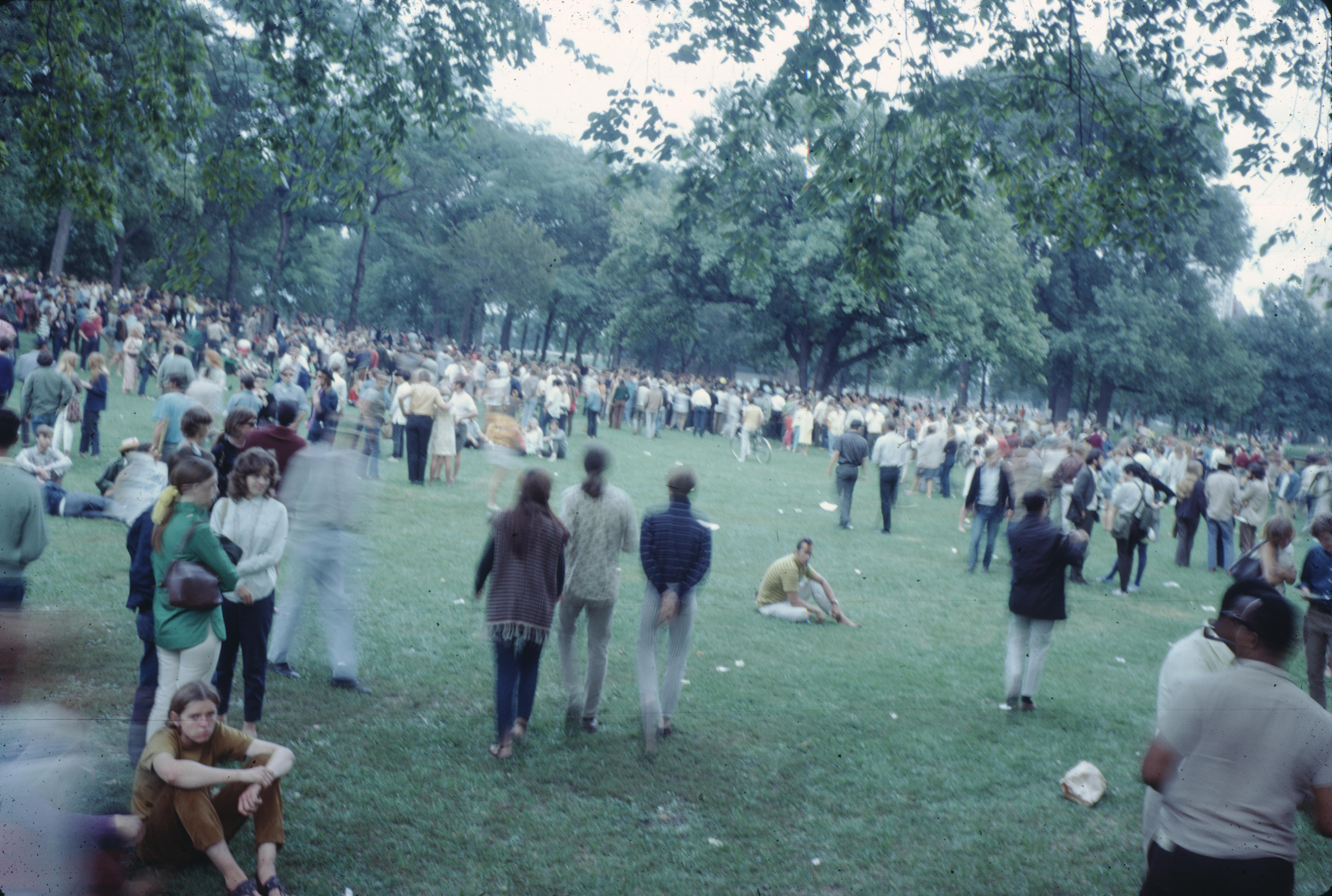
People in Lincoln Park during the convention.

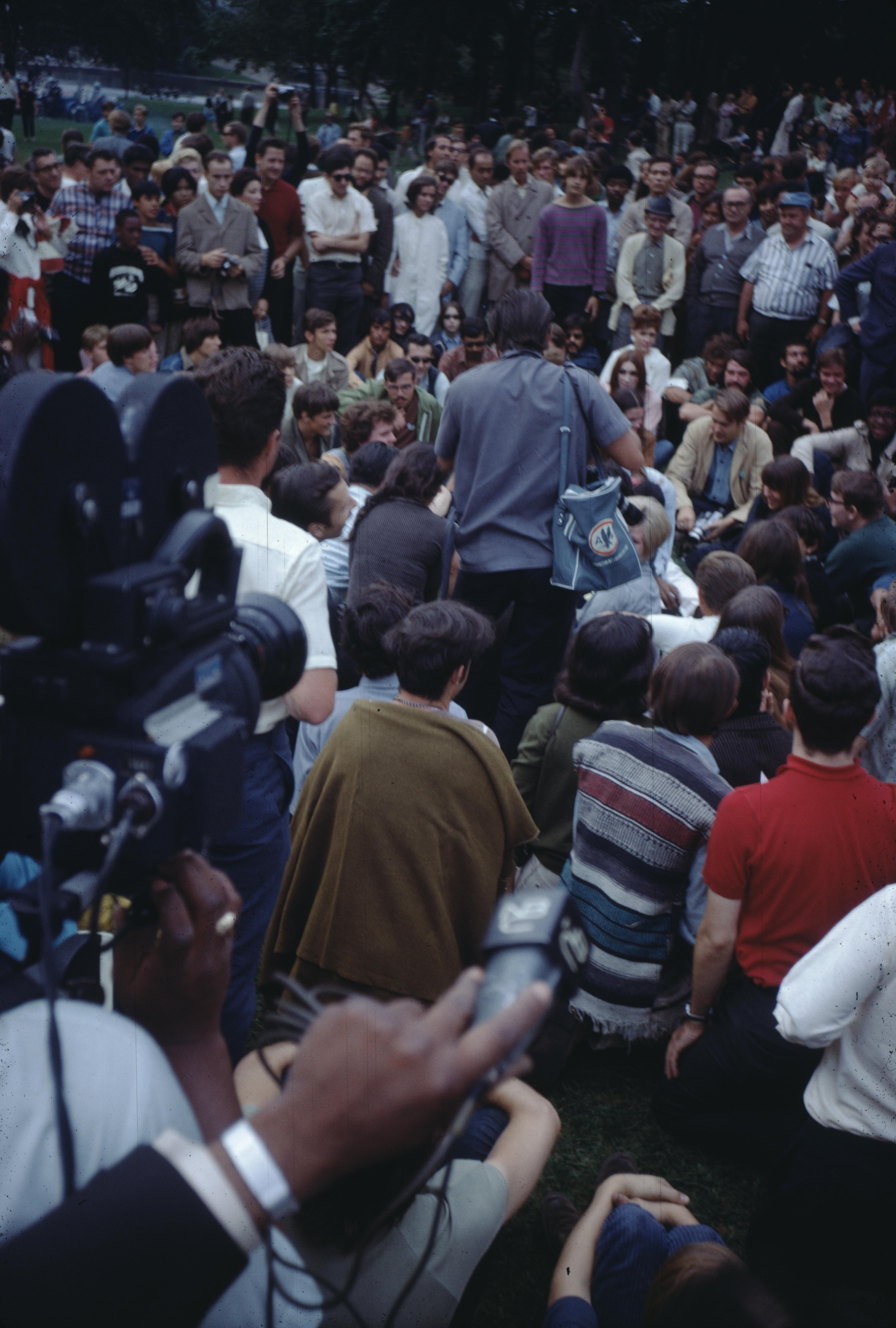
People in Lincoln Park during the convention, being recorded by NBC.

== See also ==
- Medium Cool, a 1969 fictional movie using real footage of the Chicago Convention demonstrations as backdrop
- Protests of 1968
- List of incidents of civil unrest in the United States
- Songs of Innocence and Experience, a 1970 album recorded by Allen Ginsberg, inspired in part by his witness of the protest
- 2023 Democratic National Committee protests
- 2024 Democratic National Convention § Protests and demonstrations, protests that also occurred in Chicago at the 2024 Democratic National Convention regarding the United States's support for Israel amid the Gaza war.
