= Stephanie Chase =

American violinist (born c. 1957)

- Born: Stephanie Ann Chase c. 1957 (age 68–69); Evanston, Illinois, U.S.
- Genre: Classical
- Occupations: Concert violinist, educator
- Instrument: Violin
- Years active: 1973–present
- Labels: Koch International Classics; Cala; Harmonia Mundi
- Website: www.stephaniechase.com

Stephanie Ann Chase (born c. 1957) is an American classical violinist.

== Life and career ==
Chase was born in Evanston, Illinois. She is the daughter of two musicians, the noted arranger and composer Bruce Chase and violinist Fannie (Paschell) Chase. She gave her first public performance when only two years old and was recognized as a child prodigy. She studied first with her mother and then embarked on studies with Sally Thomas, then an assistant to Ivan Galamian at The Juilliard School. While still in her teens she moved to Belgium to study privately with Arthur Grumiaux, who is noted as "holding her in regard for her energy and the way in which she put into practice what he taught...(and) she remained one of his preferred pupils." Following her return to the United States, Chase attended the Marlboro Festival in Vermont in the early 1980s, where she was coached in chamber music by musicians that included Rudolf Serkin, Rudolf Firkusny, Felix Galimir, Samuel Rhodes, and David Soyer.

Chase's playing is characterized by "virtuosity galore," with "great intensity and a huge tone, the epitome of the modern violinist," and she is "renowned for her impeccable intonation." As soloist, she has performed in twenty-five countries with over one hundred and seventy orchestras that include the New York Philharmonic, the London Symphony Orchestra, the Chicago Symphony, the Hong Kong Philharmonic, the San Francisco Symphony, the American Classical Orchestra, and the Atlanta Symphony, among many others. Her active repertoire features over 50 concertos and she has soloed in collaboration with conductors that include Zubin Mehta, Leonard Slatkin, Herbert Blomstedt, Frans Brüggen, Marin Alsop, Roy Goodman, Hugh Wolff and Stanislaw Skrowaczewski.

In recent seasons, Chase has performed concerts throughout the United States and in Mexico, including recitals at New York's 92nd Street Y, New York University, Bargemusic, Williams College, Dickinson College, and WGBH radio, as soloist with orchestras that include the Long Beach Symphony, Boulder Chamber Orchestra, Eastern Connecticut Symphony, the Monterrey and Yucatán (Mexico) Symphony Orchestras, Stanford Philharmonia, San Jose Chamber Orchestra, and the Seattle Collaborative Orchestra, and in chamber music concerts presented by the Music of the Spheres Society, New York University, Music in Context, and the Bronx Arts Ensemble.

In December 2009, her "sensational" performances of Elgar's Violin Concerto with the Louisville Orchestra was selected as a "Classical Act of the Decade." In October 2011, her New York recital with pianist Sara Davis Buechner was chosen by WQXR as one of "20 Concerts to Hear This Fall" and by Musical America as a "Critic's Choice." That same month she gave the apparent North American concert premiere of the "Sonata in A Major for violin solo, MS 83" by Niccolo Paganini at a recital at New York University. In the fall of 2012 she performed all ten of Beethoven's Violin Sonatas in consecutive nights with pianist Sara Davis Buechner, her frequent recital partner, at New York's Yamaha Piano Salon.

Her discography, for Koch Records (E-1 Entertainment), Cala Records, harmonia mundi, and others encompasses major concerti, chamber works, collections of salon pieces by diverse composers, and includes several world premieres.

Chase is also a specialist in period instrument practice and actively performs on both types of violins. Of her 2009 performance with the American Classical Orchestra, the New York Times noted that "the fine violinist Stephanie Chase was an elegant soloist in Beethoven's Romance in F for violin and orchestra." She is a regular guest artist on Houston's Music in Context series, most recently (Fall, 2014) for all-Schumann and all-Beethoven concerts performed on original instruments.

Chase attained world prominence as a top medalist of the International Tchaikovsky Competition in 1982, an achievement that is especially remarkable in view of the extremely poor relations that existed between the United States and the Soviet Union at the time plus the fact that violin jury chairman Leonid Kogan had two of his own students, Viktoria Mullova and Sergei Stadler, competing.

In 1986, Chase was a featured soloist with the Hong Kong Philharmonic on its debut concert tour of the People's Republic of China, with Kenneth Schermerhorn conducting. The following year, she was awarded the prestigious Avery Fisher Career Grant.

Her recording of Beethoven's Violin Concerto and Romances, with the Hanover Band, was the first ever on period instruments and features her own cadenzas. It has been selected as “one of the twenty most outstanding performances in the work's recorded history” and honored with the highest possible ratings by BBC Music Magazine in a review by scholar H. C. Robbins Landon. Chase's experience in period instrument playing led her to join a New York Times music critic in faulting cellist Yo-Yo Ma for a performance on "Baroque" cello in which his cello and bow evidently were not historically accurate.

In 2001, she co-founded the Music of the Spheres Society, which is devoted to exploring the links between music, philosophy, and the sciences. Chase is a former member of the Boston Chamber Music Society (1982–1997) and has recorded several works with the ensemble. She is a frequent guest of music festivals worldwide, including Caramoor, Kuhmo (Finland), the Cape Cod Chamber Music Festival, the Martha's Vineyard Chamber Music Festival, the Mt. Desert Festival of Chamber Music, Music at Bear Valley (CA), the Seattle Chamber Music Festival, Sommerfest (sponsored by the Minnesota Orchestra), Nuits de Bourgogne and Music from Marlboro. In July 2010 she replaced an artist on one day's notice for three concerts at the Bravo! Vail Festival that included the Colorado premiere of Joan Tower's Piano Quartet.

Following the attacks on the World Trade Center in New York City, Chase was among the musicians who were invited to cross through National Guard security and perform for the rescue and recovery workers in St. Paul's Chapel, which was used as a relief center.

Between 2007 and 2011, Chase programmed and hosted several events at the Philoctetes Center as part of its "Music and Imagination" series.

Music arrangements by Stephanie Chase have been performed by Itzhak Perlman and The Perlman Music Program and performed and recorded by The American String Project. In January 2015 she premiered her arrangements - for solo violin and string orchestra - of works by Pablo de Sarasate, with the San Jose Chamber Orchestra, which led to an immediate re-engagement.

Articles by Stephanie Chase have been published in journals that include Strings Magazine and The Strad.

From 2002 to 2019 Chase was an assistant professor of violin and chamber music at the Steinhardt School at New York University. Formerly a member of the faculties of the Boston Conservatory, the Massachusetts Institute of Technology (adjunct) and a visiting artist at Vassar College, she has given master classes throughout the United States and in Mexico, including the San Francisco Conservatory, Rice University, Southern Methodist University, the Institute for Strings, Oberlin College, and the University of Texas (Austin). She is a frequent judge for concerto competitions at The Juilliard School and other institutions that include the Concert Artists Guild, the Concorso Andrea Postacchini in Italy, and the Cooper Competition in Oberlin, Ohio.

Chase plays on a violin made in 1742 by Pietro Guarneri, the ex-Paschell, which she pairs with a bow made by Dominique Peccatte. Her Classical violin, which is outfitted with gut strings, a Baroque-model bridge and no chinrest, is by an unknown German maker and dates from circa 1790. With this violin she employs a transitional-style bow.

== Personal ==
Stephanie Chase is married to the musical instrument expert Stewart Pollens and is an aunt to the actors Becki Newton and Matt Newton.

== Discography ==
Vítězslava Kaprálová - Music for violin and piano (2008) (with pianist Virginia Eskin)
Ravel: Five O'Clock Foxtrot - Tzigane (re-released 2008) (with The Philharmonia)
Bygone Days - Music for Violin and Piano by Rudolf Friml (2006) (with pianist Sara Davis Buechner)
Live from Benaroya Hall - Music by Sarasate, arr. by Stephanie Chase, with The American String Project (2006)
Music for Horn - Brahms Horn Trio, with Lowell Greer and Steven Lubin (2001) (on period instruments)
Mozart: Violin Concerti (1994) (on period instruments)
Beethoven: Violin Concerto and Romances (1993) (on period instruments)
Boccherini: Sei Sonata a Tre - (1994) (with Max Barros, fortepiano, and Christine Gummere, cello, on period instruments)
Schoenberg: Verklaerte Nacht - (1991) (with members of the Boston Chamber Music Society)

== Awards ==
She won the Chicago Symphony Orchestra's Youth Competition at age nine.
First prize, G. B. Dealey Competition
Top prizewinner, International Tchaikovsky Competition
Avery Fisher Career Grant
