= Bruce Chase =

American composer (1912–2001)

- Born: Robert Bruce Chase; March 22, 1912; Muscatine, Iowa, U.S.
- Died: June 29, 2001 (aged 89); Branford, Connecticut, U.S.
- Occupations: Composer, music arranger, pianist
- Years active: 1939–1992
- Spouse: Fannie Paschell (m. 1952; died 2000)
- Children: 4; including Stephanie
- Relatives: Matt Newton (grandson); Becki Newton (granddaughter)

Robert Bruce Chase (March 22, 1912 – June 29, 2001) was an American composer and music arranger.

== Biography ==
=== Early life and education ===
Robert Bruce Chase was born on March 22, 1912, in Muscatine, Iowa. His parents were locally prominent musicians; his father a violinist and his mother a piano teacher, and he began to play violin at a young age. By his early teens he was performing concerts locally. After his graduation from high school, Chase found that concert work for violinists was scarce and he began to play with dance bands, mostly as a pianist. He gradually began to make music arrangements for the dance bands – which needed music arranged to suit their instrumentation – and proved not only adept but also able to create them quickly.

=== Career ===
In 1939 Chase created an arrangement of "I Got Rhythm" (from the Gershwin musical Girl Crazy) for a Pops concert played by the Kansas Philharmonic (now the Kansas City Symphony) while he was a member of the violin section. The arrangement was enormously successful and he took it as an example of his work to NBC Radio in Chicago, where he was initially hired as a part-time violinist and music arranger. Within a short time, he was employed full-time as a staff musician, arranger and conductor. Among the popular shows for which he worked were The Red Skelton Show, Fibber McGee and Molly, and The Carnation Contented Hour. For two years during World War II Chase was stationed in the Great Lakes Naval Training Station where he was chief arranger, writing music arrangements and conducting.

At the conclusion of his service, Chase worked for ABC (formerly the "Blue" or radio division of NBC), where he found success as the staff arranger and conductor of the award-winning children's television show Super Circus (1949-1955). Subsequently, he worked for other ABC children's shows that included The Land of Ziggy Zoggo. From 1965 until it went off the air in 1968, Chase was the staff arranger and conductor for the nationally broadcast radio show Don McNeill's Breakfast Club.

Unfortunately, live television shows were then declining - taping in advance had become the norm - and having an inhouse band or orchestra was close to obsolete. Facing a shift in his career, Chase relocated with his family to Connecticut and turned to making educational music albums, first published by Chappell Music, for use in primary and secondary schools. These included original music as well as arrangements of other tunes, and many are still available through the Hal Leonard catalog.

Recognizing a need for a more reliable income, Chase resumed playing the violin and in 1972 auditioned for the second violin section of the Milwaukee Symphony Orchestra, which additionally recognized his talents for music arrangements and hired him. He remained as a member of the orchestra until he was well into his seventies, and frequently conducted the orchestra in its performances of his arrangements on its Pops concerts. In 1999 - several years after Chase had retired and moved back to Connecticut - the Milwaukee Symphony played his "St. Louis Samba" on a historic concert in Cuba, as an encore that brought down the house. Chase then became ill with cancer in his colon and died June 29, 2001, st Hospice in Branford Connecticut.

Chase was active making symphonic music arrangements until about 1992.

=== Marriage and children ===
From 1952, Bruce was married to violinist and teacher Fannie (Paschell) Chase (1919–2000) and the father of four daughters with her, including violinist Stephanie Chase. He had two additional children from a previous marriage; among his grandchildren are the actors Becki Newton – best known for her role on Ugly Betty – and Matt Newton.

=== Death and afterward ===
Bruce Chase died of colon cancer on June 29, 2001, at a hospice in Branford, Connecticut.

Chase was a direct descendant of Aquila Chase, a Massachusetts Bay colonist and cofounder of Newbury, Massachusetts. Among his relatives were Salmon Portland Chase, the Secretary of the Treasury under Abraham Lincoln and, later, Chief Justice of the Supreme Court, and for whom Chase Bank is named.

== Sources ==
- "Violinist Arranges Laughter at Symphony:" The Milwaukee Sentinel, April 11, 1984
