= Acousticity (David Grisman album) =

Studio album by David Grisman
- Released: 1984
- Studio: Indigo Ranch Studios (Malibu, California)
- Genre: Americana, newgrass, jazz
- Length: 36:16
- Label: MCA
- Producer: David Grisman

David Grisman chronology
| Mandolin Abstractions (1983) | Acousticity (1984) | Svingin' with Svend (1987) |

Professional ratings
Review scores
| Source | Rating |
|---|---|
| Allmusic | 2/5 stars |

Acousticity is an album by American musician David Grisman, released in 1984.

== Track listing ==
All compositions by David Grisman unless otherwise noted.

1. "Acousticity" – 4:11
2. "Dancin'" (Grisman, Jim Buchanan) – 4:22
3. "Brazilian Breeze" – 4:29
4. "Blue Sky Bop" (Rob Wasserman) – 4:49
5. "Dawgalypso (The Island Song)" – 3:45
6. "Tango for Django" – 3:04
7. "Ricochet" (Grisman, R. Somers) – 2:18
8. "Newmonia" – 6:24
9. "Pamela" – 2:54

== Personnel ==
- David Grisman – mandolin, mandola
- Hal Blaine – drums, percussion
- Jim Buchanan – violin, whistle
- Rob Wasserman – bass
- Jon Sholle – guitar
- Bob Doll – trumpet
- Ron Taormina – saxophone
- Pee Wee Ellis – saxophone
- Richard Greene – violin
- Joy Lyle – violin
- Sid Sharp – violin
- Jesse Ehrlich – cello

Production notes:

- David Grisman – producer
- Greg Fulginiti – mastering

== Chart positions ==
| Year | Chart | Position |
|---|---|---|
| 1986 | Billboard Jazz Albums | 6 |
