= Mary Hartline =

American actress (1927–2020)

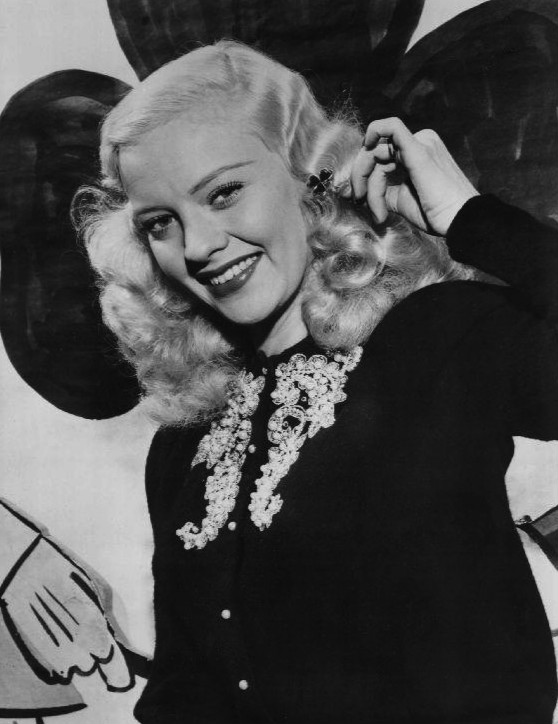
Mary Hartline in 1952.

Mary Pauline Hartline (October 29, 1927 – August 12, 2020) was an American model and actress who became one of television's early stars.

== Early life ==
Hartline was born in Hillsboro, Illinois, the second child and second daughter of Paul and Dorothy Crowder Hartline. Her father was involved in local politics, becoming chairman of the Montgomery County Democratic Party and, after Franklin D. Roosevelt was elected president, the Hillsboro postmaster. Hartline graduated from Hillsboro High School, where she was elected the "Queen of Love and Beauty" (then the equivalent of the prom queen).

Harold Stokes was a Montgomery County native who had gained success as a band leader and radio personality. During a period that he was out of broadcasting, he was living near Hillsboro and was persuaded to produce a local amateur show fund-raiser. Hartline was a dancer in the show.

== Career ==
Upon graduating from high school, with the encouragement of Stokes, Hartline moved to Chicago with the intent to become a model. In 1945, she was cast in ABC radio's Teen Town (later known as Junior Junction). The program made its debut on 2 January 1946 and featured Hartline leading a 16-member Sweetheart Band, which was composed of eight boys and eight girls. The cast of this show, produced by Harold Stokes, included Dick York as the mayor of a town inhabited only by teenagers. While appearing on this show, Hartline was stricken with a severe case of polio, but quickly recovered. In 1947, the twenty-one-year-old Hartline married the forty-two-year-old Stokes.

In 1949, the ABC television network picked up the local show Super Circus, which was also produced by Stokes. Hartline moved to Super Circus, where her looks and figure made her a national star and a sex symbol for thousands of boys, young and old. The show, starring former Chicago World's Fair barker, Big Band announcer, and radio host Claude Kirchner, featured Hartline as the band leader, the circus clowns Cliffy, Scampy, and Nicky, as well as Mike Wallace playing the circus barker peddling Peter Pan Peanut Butter.

Super Circus was a hit, put on the cover of TV Guide, and was produced in Chicago through 1955. The network then moved it to New York City, replaced Kirchner with Jerry Colonna and Hartline with Sandy Wirth, and produced what was to be the show's final season. Hartline, however, made the best of her years on the show, marketing her own line of dolls, clothes, boots, et cetera—three dozen different Mary Hartline products. In 1951, she also hosted a short-lived Mary Hartline Show on ABC TV that failed to find a sponsor.

Following the network's decision to move Super Circus to New York City, Hartline returned to local Chicago TV in 1957 with Princess Mary's Magic Castle, which aired for a year and a half. Thereafter, Hartline retired from show business. She was enshrined in Chicago's Museum of Broadcast Communications in 2012.

== Personal life ==
Hartline married four times and had no children:

- Harold Barclay Stokes, married 15 June 1947, separated 16 January 1950, divorced 3 February 1951.
- George Hugh Barnard, a Chicago attorney, married 27 December 1951, divorced 15 July 1960.
- George Alfred Carlson, president of Chicago's Central Contractors Service Inc. and Central Rent-a-Crane Company, married Arlington, Virginia, 18 November 1960, died 28 April 1963.
- Woolworth Donahue, an heir to the F. W. Woolworth Company fortune and a cousin of Barbara Hutton; they married in Calverton, New York, on 26 December 1964, and he died in 1972. The Donahues were yachting enthusiasts and fixtures of the "old money" set in Palm Beach, Florida, and Southampton, New York, where Hartline remained for many years.

In her final years, she returned to residing in her home town of Hillsboro, Illinois.

== Death ==
Hartline died on August 12, 2020, at her home in Hillsboro, Illinois at the age of 92. Her death was confirmed by the Hough & Sons Funeral Home.
