= The whole world is watching =

Phrase at the 1968 Democratic National Convention

- Chicago police drag an anti-Vietnam war protester across Michigan Avenue on August 28, 1968, during the Democratic National Convention as the crowd chants "The whole world is watching".
- Context: Opposition to United States involvement in the Vietnam War; 1968 Democratic National Convention protests
- Meaning: Police brutality being televised across the world

"The whole world is watching" was a phrase chanted by anti-Vietnam War demonstrators as they were beaten and arrested by police outside the Conrad Hilton Hotel in Chicago during the 1968 Democratic National Convention.

The event occurred and was broadcast nationally from taped footage on the night of Wednesday, August 28, the third day of the convention. Demonstrators took up the chant as police were beating and pulling many of them into police vans, "each with a superfluous whack of a nightstick," after the demonstrators, being barricaded in the park by the police, began to come into Michigan Avenue in front of the hotel.

The prescient and apparently spontaneous chant quickly became famous. The following year, it served as the title of a television movie about student activism.

== Origin ==
The origin of the phrase is unclear. The phrase was used in the late 1950s regarding international coverage of U.S. Civil Rights events, such as the Little Rock integration crisis. The 1963 Bob Dylan song "When the Ship Comes In" contains the lyric "And the ship's wise men / Will remind you once again / That the whole wide world is watchin'." Peter, Paul and Mary, who performed for the demonstrators during the convention, covered Dylan's song on their 1965 album A Song Will Rise.

Don Rose, who was press secretary for the Chicago office of the National Mobilization Committee to End the War in Vietnam, the primary organizer of the Chicago actions, has said in several interviews that he coined the phrase prior to a press conference on Monday, August 26, at which Mobe organizer Rennie Davis spoke. Davis asked Rose what they could say about the violence of the Chicago police the night before in Lincoln Park and Rose said, "tell them the whole world is watching and they'll never get away with it again."

== Current usage ==
Today, the phrase is regularly used in protests and mainstream left movements. It is the title of a 1980 book about mass media and the New Left by former student activist Todd Gitlin. Conservative commentators such as Victor Davis Hanson have also used the phrase to argue for such causes as U.S. condemnation of Islamic violence. During the 2011 Wisconsin protests, protesters in Madison, Wisconsin, chanted the phrase often in reference to the large national media presence and worldwide positive response. Protesters also chanted the phrase while being arrested and removed from the Capitol the morning of the first vote on the law they were protesting. Occupy Wall Street protesters chanted the phrase on October 1, 2011, when NYPD barricaded and arrested citizens who were blocking the roadway on the Brooklyn Bridge in one of the largest mass-arrests of otherwise nonviolent demonstrators in US history. "The Whole World Is Watching" was on a banner purposely blocking the view of ropes being tied to the statue of Silent Sam in 2018, minutes before the statue was pulled down.

U.S. President Barack Obama used the phrase during demonstrations in Tehran over the outcome of Iranian elections in 2009.

During the trial of Derek Chauvin (who was facing charges for the murder of George Floyd), Benjamin Crump, the attorney representing Floyd's family, said to reporters on March 29, 2021 "What we want to know is, will we see justice? […] The whole world is watching."

Gaza war protesters outside the 2024 Democratic National Convention, also in Chicago, used the phrase.
