= Hilton Chicago =

Hilton-branded hotel in Chicago

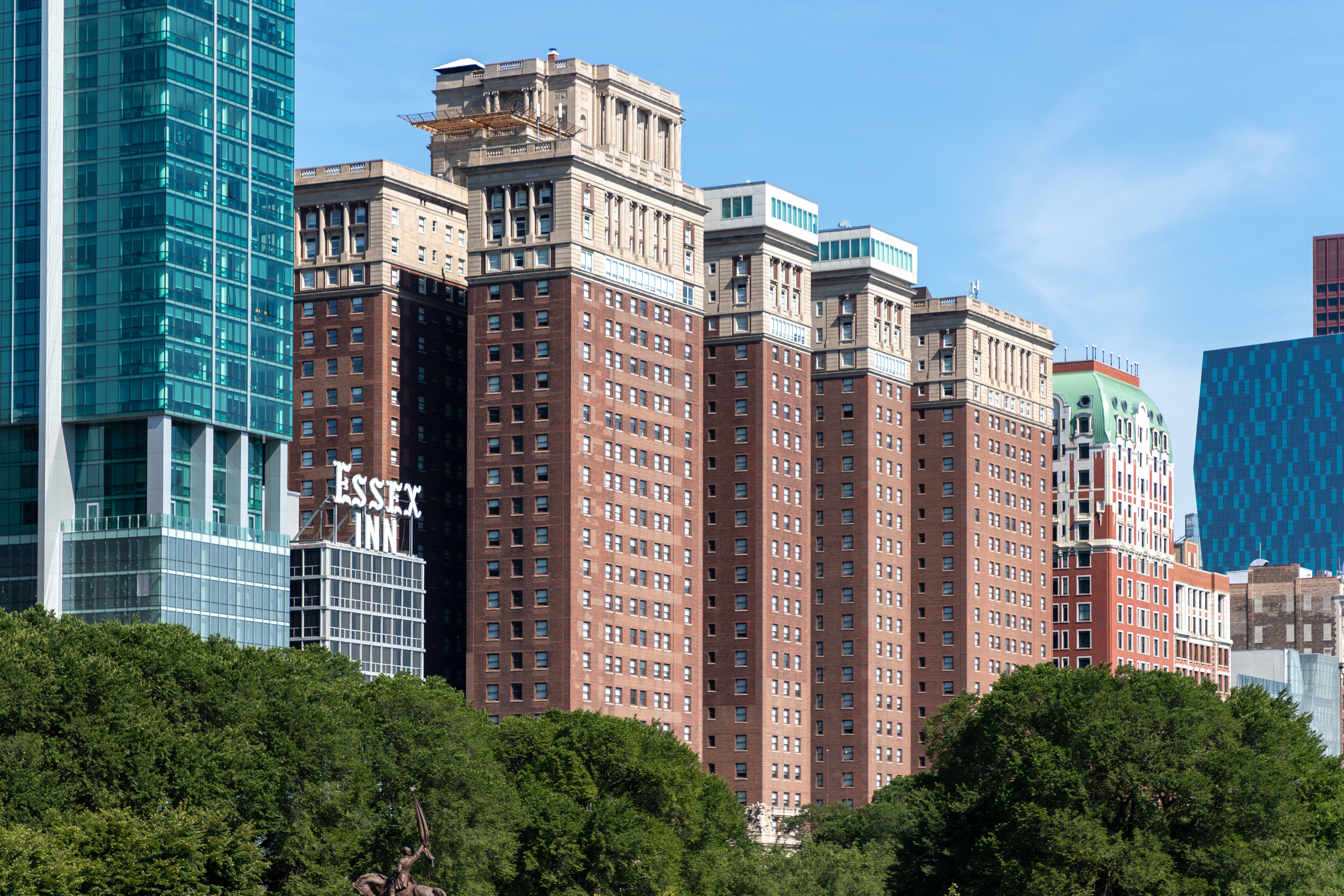
- Hilton Chicago in 2020

- Location within Illinois
- Former names: Stevens Hotel (1927–1951); Conrad Hilton (1951–1985); Chicago Hilton and Towers (1985–1998)

General information
- Architectural style: Beaux-Arts architecture
- Location: 720 S. Michigan Avenue; Chicago, IL, United States
- Coordinates: 41.8724°N 87.6243°W
- Opening: May 2, 1927
- Owner: Hilton Hotels Corporation

Technical details
- Floor count: 30
- Floor area: 2,054,590 square feet (190,878 m^{2})

Design and construction
- Architect: Holabird & Roche

Other information
- Number of rooms: 1,544
- Number of suites: 90
- Number of restaurants: 3
- Parking: 510-car capacity parking garage

Website
- hilton.com/hilton-chicago

Hilton Chicago (previously known as Chicago Hilton and Towers from 1985 to 1998) is a centrally located luxury hotel in Chicago, Illinois, United States. The hotel is a Chicago landmark that overlooks Grant Park, Lake Michigan, and the Museum Campus. It is the third-largest hotel in Chicago by number of guest rooms; however, it has the largest total meeting and event space of any hotel in the city. From its opening in 1927 through 2008, every sitting president of the United States had been housed in the hotel before leaving office.

== History ==
=== The Stevens Hotel ===
The hotel, designed in the Beaux-Arts architecture style, opened on May 2, 1927, as the Stevens Hotel, across Balbo Street from the older Blackstone Hotel. At the time, the Stevens was the largest hotel in the world. The hotel was developed by James W. Stevens, his son Ernest, and their family who ran the Illinois Life Insurance Company and owned the Hotel La Salle; James and Ernest Stevens are the grandfather and father, respectively, of Supreme Court Justice John Paul Stevens. The Stevens featured 3,000 guest rooms, cost approximately $30 million to construct (more than ten times the cost of Yankee Stadium only a few years earlier), and boasted of a virtual "City Within a City". The Stevens housed its own bowling alley, barber shop, rooftop miniature golf course (the "High-Ho Club"), movie theater, ice cream shop, and drug store. The first registered guest was then-vice president of the United States Charles G. Dawes.

The Great Depression ruined the Stevens family, and the State of Illinois charged the hotel's owners with financial corruption. They were convicted of embezzlement, but the conviction was reversed unanimously on appeal. Like four out of five American hotels during the Great Depression, the Stevens Hotel went bankrupt. The government took the hotel into receivership, and by the late 1930s, it was valued at only $7 million.

In 1942, the United States Army purchased the Stevens Hotel for $6 million for use as barracks and classrooms for the United States Army Air Force during World War II. The Stevens housed over 10,000 air cadets during this time, who utilized the Grand Ballroom as their mess hall. In January 1944, the United States Department of War closed a deal to sell the property for $4.91 million to a bricklayer turned private businessman named Stephen Healy.

On December 7, 1944, delegates from 54 nations gathered in the Grand Ballroom of the Stevens Hotel to conclude and sign the Convention on International Civil Aviation, also known more popularly as the "Chicago Convention", the defining international agreement which has since permitted the global civil aviation system to develop peacefully and in a manner benefiting all peoples and nations of the world.

=== The Conrad Hilton ===
As World War II drew to a close, Conrad Hilton purchased the hotel from Healy in February 1945. The board of directors changed the name of the hotel, naming it after Conrad Hilton himself on November 19, 1951. Hilton continued to use his Hollywood connections to entice film stars, politicians, and royalty to the hotel.

Among improvements made to the hotel was the installation of a large ice stage in the Boulevard Room Supper Club which began featuring elaborate ice shows in 1948. In January 1958, Darlene and Jinx the skating chimpanzee performed. The Hilton Center was added to the building in 1962, featuring a three-level structure containing expanded exhibit space, the Continental Ballroom and the International Ballroom.

In April 1951, crowds gathered in the Great Hall to hear a speech by general Douglas MacArthur defending his conduct of the war in Korea, calling for a new American policy toward the conflict to replace the current "political vacuum".

Chicago Police outside the Conrad Hilton during the 1968 Democratic National Convention.

During the 1968 Democratic National Convention, the streets outside the Conrad Hilton Hotel were the scene of a police riot as antiwar demonstrators, being beaten and arrested, began to chant "The whole world is watching". Some protesters escaped into the hotel, along with tear gas and "stink bombs", and the hotel suffered minor damage as a result of the violence as a couple of street level windows gave way under the weight of dozens of protesters being pushed up against them by the police.

=== Chicago Hilton and Towers ===
The Conrad Hilton Hotel was aging and in the 1970s, its demolition was considered. However, in 1984, the hotel closed for over a year for what was then the most expensive hotel renovation ever undertaken, at $185 million. The hotel's 3,000 guest rooms were rebuilt into 1,544 larger and more elegant rooms; 600 were converted to double-sized rooms with two adjoining bathrooms. The renovated hotel helped to sustain a revival period in Chicago's South Loop neighborhood. The newly renamed Chicago Hilton and Towers reopened on October 1, 1985.

=== Hilton Chicago ===
In 1998, under a new initiative by Hilton Hotels Corporation, the Hilton name was placed first in branding, and the Chicago Hilton and Towers became simply "Hilton Chicago".

Under general manager John G. Wells, the hotel continues its track record of having hosted every U.S. president since it opened in 1927.

In 2012 the hotel started a $150 million renovation, including new dining outlets 720 South Bar & Grill, SNAX and Kitty O'Sheas.

The Hilton Chicago was inducted into Historic Hotels of America, the official program of the National Trust for Historic Preservation, in 2015.

In March 2020, the hotel closed due to the COVID-19 pandemic. It reopened again 15 months later in June 2021.

== The Conrad Hilton Suite ==
The Hilton Chicago is home to Chicago's largest and most expensive hotel room, which formerly served as the Tower Ballroom. The Conrad Hilton Suite is a 5,000-square-foot (460 m^{2}) suite that encompasses two floors, T3 and T4. The suite costs more than $7,000 per night. Refurbished in 2013, the suite includes 16-foot lake view windows, a baby grand piano, a billiard table, three balconies, three bedrooms on the lower level - each with multiple flat screen televisions, and a helipad. It has hosted famous guests such as Tony Blair, Jay Blunk, Frank Sinatra, John Travolta and Hu Jintao.

== Appearances in popular culture ==
The Hilton Chicago has been featured in many prominent movies and TV shows including:

- Empire (TV series) (2015–2020)
- Little Fockers (2010)
- The Express: The Ernie Davis Story (2008)
- Road to Perdition (2002)
- Unconditional Love (2002)
- Love and Action in Chicago (1999)
- U.S. Marshals (1998)
- My Best Friend's Wedding (1997)
- Primal Fear (1996)
- E.R. (TV series) (1994–2009)
- The Fugitive (1993)
- Home Alone 2: Lost in New York (1992)
- The Package (1989)

The Hilton Chicago is home to the Normandie Lounge, a promenade that was created from panels and furniture from the famed French Line ocean liner, SS Normandie.

In Bernard Malamud's 1952 novel The Natural, Harriet Bird shoots Roy Hobbs in a room at the Stevens Hotel.

== See also ==
- List of Historic Hotels of America

== Works cited ==
- Allegrini, Robert V. (November 9, 2005). Chicago's Grand Hotels. Arcadia Publishing. ISBN 978-1439616598.
