= Super Circus =

US television program

- Directed by: Ed Skotch
- Presented by: Mary Hartline; Claude Kirchner
- Music by: Bruce Chase

Production
- Producer: Phil Patton

Original release
- Network: ABC
- Release: 1949 – 1956

A 1954 episode of the show

Super Circus is an American television program that aired live on Sunday afternoons from 5 to 6pm Eastern Time from 1949 to 1956 on ABC. The show was produced in Chicago by WENR-TV, continuing through its call letter change to WBKB (today's WLS-TV) through 1955, and its production moved to New York City and WABC-TV for its final season. The award-winning show featured circus and clown acts performing in front of a studio audience. Mary Hartline and Claude Kirchner were the hosts (Jerry Colonna succeeded Kirchner as "Ringmaster" in the final New York season), and Bruce Chase conducted the band. Phil Patton was the producer, and Ed Skotch was the director. Sponsors for the show included Kellogg's, Mars, Canada Dry Ginger Ale, and Sweetheart Soap.

== History ==
Hartline, known for her short skirts, white boots and long blonde hair, became one of television's first sex symbols, spawning merchandise such as dolls, clothes, and boots --- three dozen different Mary Hartline products.

For at least the 1951 and 1952 seasons, each day Kirchner selected one child from the audience to stick his hand into a jar full of coins, attempting to pull out and keep as much money as possible. There were no dollar coins in the jar, but Kirchner always announced when he spotted a "fifty-cent piece" among the coins retrieved and the audience was prompted to cheer.

In 1951, the program received a Micahel Award as the best children's show on television. Also that year, the Lion's Club of Illinois named it the best children's TV program, and the Chicago Federated Advertising Club rated it as one of the four best shows on TV.

== Episode status ==
A small number of episodes survive in film archives and private collections, and are in the public domain. Six episodes were released to DVD on October 28, 2008, by Alpha Video, and several have been posted to both the Internet Archive and YouTube.

== See also ==
- Captain Video and His Video Rangers
- Howdy Doody
- Ding Dong School
- The Magic Clown
