= Chase (surname) =

Family name

- Gender: male or female
- Language: Old French

Origin
- Origin: Old French word Chacier meaning "to catch / seize"
- Meaning: Hunter or Huntsman
- Region of origin: England

Other names
- Nicknames: Chasey, Chaser
- Derived: Chasseur

Chase is a surname in the English language, especially popular in the United States

== Notable people with the surname "Chase" include ==
=== A ===
- Adam Chase (writer), American writer
- Adelaide Cole Chase (1868–1944), American painter
- Adele Stimmel Chase (1917–2000), American artist
- Adiescar Chase, English musician
- Alison Becker Chase (born 1946), American dance instructor
- Allan Chase (born 1956), American musician
- Allan Chase (writer) (1913–1993), American writer and independent scholar
- Amanda Chase (born 1969), American politician
- Amos Chase (1718–1818), American archdeacon
- Anna McClarmonde Chase (1809–1874), American spy
- Andy Chase, American musician
- Annazette Chase (born 1943), American actress
- Anrie Chase (born 2004), Japanese footballer
- Anthony Chase, American professor
- Archibald Alderman Chase (1884–1917), English military officer
- Arlen F. Chase (born 1953), American archaeologist
- Arthur Chase (disambiguation), multiple people
- Athol Kennedy Chase (1936–2020), Australian anthropologist
- Augustus Sabin Chase (1828–1896), American industrialist

=== B ===
- Bailey Chase (born 1972), American actor
- Barrie Chase, American actress
- Beatrice Chase (1874–1955), British writer
- Ben Chase (1923–1998), American football player
- Bertha Crouch Chase (1874–1975), American tennis player and golfer
- Bill Chase (1934–1974), American trumpet player
- Bob Chase (1926–2016), American sportscaster
- Bobbie Chase, American editor
- Brian Chase (born 1978), American musician
- Brian Chase (basketball) (born 1981), American basketball player
- Bruce Chase (1912–2001), American composer

=== C ===
- Carl T. Chase (1902–1987), American physicist
- Carlton Chase (1794–1870), American bishop
- Cheryl Chase (disambiguation), multiple people
- Chevy Chase (born 1943), American comedian and actor
- Carroll Chase (1878–1960), American philatelist
- Charles Chase (disambiguation), multiple people
- Chaz Chase (1901–1983), Russian-American entertainer
- Chris Chase (1924–2013), American model
- Claire Chase (born 1978), American musician
- Claudia Chase, American politician
- Clifford Chase, American novelist
- Clifton "Jiggs" Chase (born 1940), American musician
- Colin Chase (1886–1937), American actor
- Colin Robert Chase (1935–1984), American academic
- Cynthia Chase (born 1943), American politician
- C. Thurston Chase (1819–1870), American academic administrator

=== D ===
- Dana B. Chase (1848–1897), American photographer
- Daveigh Chase (1990–2026), American actress
- David Chase (born 1945), American television writer
- Debbie Chase (born 1966), New Zealand field hockey player
- Debra Martin Chase (born 1956), American television producer
- De Lanson Alson Newton Chase (1875–1953), American politician
- Diane Chase, Canadian musician
- Diane Zaino Chase (born 1953), American anthropologist
- Doris Totten Chase (1923–2008), American painter
- Drummond Percy Chase (1820–1902), English academic administrator
- Duane Chase (born 1950), American software engineer
- Dudley Chase (1771–1846), American politician

=== E ===
- Earl "Flat" Chase (1910–1954), Canadian baseball player
- Edith Chase (1924–2017), American activist
- Edna Woolman Chase (1877–1957), American editor
- Edsel Chase (born 1968), Barbadian sprinter
- Edward Leigh Chase (1884–1965), American painter
- Eleanor Barrow Chase (1918–2002), American social worker
- Emory A. Chase (1854–1921), American judge
- Enoch Chase (1809–1892), American physician
- Eric Chase (1931–1989), Guyanese cricketer

=== F ===
- Fanny DuBois Chase (1828–1902), American social reformer and author
- Flo Chase, Australian singer-songwriter
- Francis Chase, American politician
- Frank Swift Chase (1886–1959), American painter
- Frederic Chase (1853–1925), British academic and bishop

=== G ===
- Gail M. Chase, American accountant
- George Chase (disambiguation), multiple people
- Gilbert Chase (1906–1992), American historian

=== H ===
- Hal Chase (1883–1947), American baseball player
- Haldon Chase (1923–2006), American archaeologist
- Harrie B. Chase (1889–1969), American lawyer and judge
- Harry Chase (disambiguation), multiple people
- Harold W. Chase (1922–1982), American military officer and educator
- Hayley Chase (born 1991), American actress
- Heather Chase, American politician
- Helen C. Chase, American statistician
- Henry Chase (disambiguation), multiple people
- Hiram Chase (1861–1928), American lawyer
- Homer Chase (1917–1985), American activist
- Horace Chase (1810–1886), American politician
- Howard Chase (disambiguation), multiple people

=== I ===
- Ilka Chase (1905–1978), American actress
- Ira Joy Chase (1834–1895), American politician

=== J ===
- Jack Chase (disambiguation), multiple people
- Jackson B. Chase (1890–1974), American politician
- Ja'Marr Chase (born 2000), American football player
- James Chase (disambiguation), multiple people
- Jeff Chase (born 1968), American actor
- Jehu V. Chase (1869–1937), American naval officer
- Jessica Chase (born 1978), Canadian swimmer
- Jessie Kalmbach Chase (1879–1970), American painter
- J. Mitchell Chase (1891–1945), American politician
- John Chase (disambiguation), multiple people
- Jonathan Chase (disambiguation), multiple people
- Joseph Cummings Chase (1878–1965), American artist
- J. Richard Chase (1930–2010), American academic administrator
- J. Smeaton Chase (1864–1923), English-American author
- Julie Chase (born 1956), Canadian luger

=== K ===
- Kate Chase (1840–1899), American socialite
- Kathleen Chase, American politician
- Kelly Chase (born 1967), Canadian ice hockey player
- Ken Chase (disambiguation), multiple people
- Kendall Chase (born 1994), American rower
- Kevin Chase (born 1976), Canadian singer-songwriter

=== L ===
- Leah Chase (1923–2019), American chef
- Levi R. Chase (1917–1994), American pilot
- Lillian Chase (1894–1987), Canadian physician
- Lincoln Chase (1926–1980), American songwriter
- Liz Chase (1950–2018), Zimbabwean field hockey player
- Loretta Chase (born 1949), American writer
- Lorraine Chase (born 1951), English actress
- Louisa Chase (1951–2016), American painter
- Louise L. Chase (1840–1906), American social reformer
- Lucia Chase (1897–1986), American dancer
- Lucien Bonaparte Chase (1817–1864), American politician

=== M ===
- Mabel Augusta Chase (1865–1939), American physicist
- Mack C. Chase (1931–2023), American businessman
- Malcolm Chase (1957–2020), American historian
- Maralyn Chase (born 1942), American politician
- Marc Chase (born 1960), American radio executive
- March F. Chase (1876–1935), American chemical engineer
- Margaret Chase (1905–1997), American humanitarian
- Margo Chase (1958–2017), American graphic designer
- Marian Emma Chase (1844–1905), British painter
- Mark Wayne Chase (born 1951), British botanist
- Martha Chase (1927–2003), American biologist
- Martha Jenks Chase (1851–1925), American doll maker
- Martin Chase (born 1974), American football player
- Mary Chase (disambiguation), multiple people
- Melissa Chase, American cryptographer
- Merrill Chase (1905–2004), American immunologist
- Mike Chase (1952–2025), American stock car racing driver
- Mildred Portney Chase (1921–1991), American pianist
- Muriel Chase (1880–1936), Australian journalist

=== N ===
- Nash Chase, New Zealand singer
- Nicholas Frances Chase (born 1966), American composer
- Norton Chase (1861–1922), American politician

=== O ===
- Oscar Chase, American academic
- Owen Chase (1797–1869), American sailor

=== P ===
- Parker Chase (born 2001), American racing driver
- Paul Chase (disambiguation), multiple people
- Pauline Chase (1885–1962), American actress
- Pearl Chase (1888–1979), American civic leader
- Peter Chase (born 1993), Irish cricketer
- Phyllis Chase (1897–1977), English illustrator
- Pliny Chase (1820–1886), American mathematician

=== R ===
- Ralph Chase (1902–1989), American football player
- Rangi Chase (born 1986), New Zealand rugby league footballer
- Rangi Chase (rugby league, born 1918) (1918–1998), New Zealand rugby league footballer
- Ray Chase (disambiguation), multiple people
- Reuben Chase (1754–1824), American naval officer
- Rhoda Chase (1914–1978), American singer
- Rhoda Campbell Chase (died 1959), American artist and children's book illustrator
- Richard Chase (disambiguation), multiple people
- Rick Chase (1957–2002), American disc jockey
- Robert Chase (disambiguation), multiple people
- Robin Chase, American entrepreneur
- Roderick Chase (1967–2025), Barbadian cyclist
- Roger Chase (born 1953), British violist
- Roger D. Chase, American politician
- Roland E. Chase (1867–1948), American politician
- Ronald Chase (born 1934), American photographer
- Roston Chase (born 1992), Barbadian cricketer

=== S ===
- Salmon P. Chase (1808–1873), American judge
- Samuel Chase (disambiguation), multiple people
- Sara Chase, American actress
- Sarah Chase (1837–??), American activist
- Seth Chase, American politician
- Simeon B. Chase (1828–1909), American politician
- Simon Chase, British-American sound engineer
- Solon Chase (1823–1909), American farmer and politician
- Stephan Chase (1954–2019), British actor
- Stephanie Chase (born 1957), American violinist
- Stephen Chase (disambiguation), multiple people
- Steve Chase, American activist
- Stuart Chase (1888–1985), American economist
- Sylvia Chase (1938–2019), American broadcast journalist

=== T ===
- Thomas Chase (??–1449), Irish politician
- Thomas Chase (educator) (1827–1892), American educator
- Thornton Chase (1847–1912), American religious figure
- Tom Chase (born 1965), American pornographic actor
- Truddi Chase (1935–2010), American author

=== V ===
- Vera Chase (born 1970), Czech translator
- Vivian Chase (1902–1935), American criminal

=== W ===
- Warren Chase (1813–1891), American politician
- Wendy Chase, American politician
- W. Howard Chase (1910–2003), American businessman
- Will Chase (born 1970), American actor
- William Chase (disambiguation), multiple people
- Winifred B. Chase (1877–1949), American botanist

=== Z ===
- Zacheus Chase (1837–1900), American politician
- Zanna Chase, Australian oceanographer

== Fictional characters ==
- Adrian Chase, a character in DC Comics publications
- Cordelia Chase, a character on the television series Buffy the Vampire Slayer
- Danny Chase, a character in DC Comics publications
- Johnny Chase, a character on the television series Entourage
- Vincent Chase, a character on the television series Entourage
- Robert Chase (House), a character on the television series House
- Sojourn (Overwatch), also known as Vivian Chase, a character in the video game Overwatch

== See also ==
- Chase (given name)
- Chase (disambiguation)
- General Chase (disambiguation)
- Governor Chase (disambiguation)
- Justice Chase (disambiguation)
- Senator Chase (disambiguation)
