= Michael Reynolds =

Mick, Mike or Michael Reynolds may refer to:

== Actors ==
- Mike Reynolds (actor) (1929–2022), American voice actor and writer
- Michael Reynolds, British actor in one episode of BBC's David Copperfield (1966) and The First Churchills (1969)
- Michael J. Reynolds (1939–2018), Canadian actor

== Footballers ==
- Mick Reynolds (born 1935), Irish footballer, Gaelic midfielder for Featherstone Rovers
- Michael Reynolds (footballer) (born 1963), Australian rules forward
- Mike Reynolds (soccer) (1963–1991), Canadian defender

== Politicians ==
- Mike Reynolds (Australian politician) (born 1946), Australian Labor member of parliament, Queensland Legislative Assembly speaker
- Mike Reynolds (Kentucky politician), member of the Kentucky Senate
- Mike Reynolds (Oklahoma politician), member of the 49th Oklahoma Legislature
- Michael Reynolds, American Right to Life candidate in the 1998 New York gubernatorial election

== Writers ==
- Michael S. Reynolds (1937–2000), American biographer of Ernest Hemingway
- Michael E. Reynolds (born 1945), American architect, founder of Earthship Biotecture
- Michael D. Reynolds (1954–2019), American astronomer and academic

== Others ==
- Michael Reynolds (United Irishmen) (c.1771–1798), United Irish Kildare rebel leader
- Michael Reynolds, pseudonym used by the American composer George S. Chase (1909-1972)
- Mike Reynolds (conservationist) (1931–2007), British ad man who started World Parrot Trust
- Michael Joseph Reynolds (1945–1975), Irish police officer murdered by IRA member
- Michael Curtis Reynolds (born 1958), American convicted of plotting domestic terrorism
- Mike Reynolds, New Zealand business executive, former CEO of telecommunications provider 2degrees
- Michael T. Reynolds, American acting director of National Park Service in 2017–18
- Michael Reynolds, lead singer of 2002–06 American country music group Pinmonkey
- Michael Reynolds, a character in the 2001 Japanese videogame Illbleed
