= Rhoda (disambiguation) =

Rhoda is a television comedy that aired on CBS from 1974 to 1978.

Rhoda can also refer to:

People:

- Rhoda (name), a female given name
- Rhoda (biblical figure), a person who appears briefly in the Acts of the Apostles
- Franklin Rhoda (1854–1929), American writer, surveyor and Presbyterian minister
- Hilary Rhoda (born 1987), American model

Places:

- Rhoda, Kentucky, an unincorporated community
- Lake Rhoda, Colorado
- Rhoda Island, in the Nile River in Cairo, Egypt
- 907 Rhoda, an asteroid

Other uses:

- Cyclone Rhoda (1971), a 1971 cyclone in the Indian Ocean
- Rhoda (horse) (1813–after 1836), a British Thoroughbred racehorse and broodmare
