= General Chase (disambiguation) =

General Chase is a signal in the Royal Navy’s lexicon of fleet orders. General Chase may also refer to:

- George Francis Chase (1848–1925), U.S. Army Inspector General
- Harold W. Chase (1922–1982), U.S. Marine Corps Reserve major general
- John Chase (general) (1856–1918), Colorado National Guard adjudant general
- Levi R. Chase (1917–1994), U.S. Air Force major general
- William C. Chase (1895–1986), U.S. Army major general
- William Henry Chase (1798–1870), Florida Militia major general

== See also ==
- David Hendrik Chassé (1765–1849), United Kingdom of the Netherlands lieutenant general
