= Rhoda (name) =

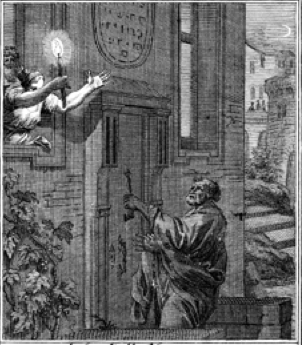
- Peter Returns by Johann Christoph Weigel, 1695. Rhoda is in the upper left of the woodcut.
- Gender: Female

Origin
- Word/name: Greek and Latin
- Meaning: Rose or "from Rhodes"

Rhoda is a feminine given name, originating in both Greek and Latin. Its primary meaning is "rose", from the Greek "rhodon", but it can also mean "from Rhodes", from the Greek Rhodos, signifying the Greek island originally named for its roses. A woman named Rhoda is mentioned once in the Bible in Acts. Rhoda has been used as a feminine form of Roderick in the Scottish Highlands. The Greek form of the name is Rhode or Rhodé, pronounced RO-dee. Numerous phonetic spelling variants are in use in the Anglosphere, including Rhodee, Rhodey, and Rhodie.

== People ==
=== Actresses ===
- Rhoda Gemignani (born 1940), American actress
- Rhoda Griffis (born 1965), American actress
- Rhoda Jordan (born 1979), African-American actress
- Rhoda Roberts (1959–2026), Australian actress and arts executive
- Rhoda Torres (born 1978), Venezuelan actress
- Rhoda Williams (1930–2006), American actress

=== Politicians ===
- Rhoda Moy Crawford (born 1989), Jamaican politician
- Rhoda Fraser (1918–1970), Scottish communist and peace campaigner
- Rhoda Grant (born 1963), Scottish Labour Member of the Scottish Parliament
- Rhoda Fox Graves (1877–1950), American suffragist, woman's rights activist, and pioneering female Republican politician
- Rhoda S. Jacobs (born 1937), American member of the New York State Assembly
- Rhoda Perry (born 1943), member of the Rhode Island Senate

=== Singers and musicians ===
- Rhoda Chase (1914–1978), American blues singer
- Rhoda Dakar (born 1958), British singer and musician, lead singer of the Bodysnatchers
- Rhoda Hutchinson, a member of the Hutchinson Family Singers, a group popular in the 1840s
- Rhoda Scott (born 1938), African-American hard bop and soul jazz organist

=== Writers ===
- Rhoda Broughton (1840–1920), Welsh novelist
- Rhoda Lerman (1936–2015), American author
- Rhoda Shipman (born 1968), American comic book writer
- Rhoda Truax (1901–2000), American author

=== Other occupations ===
- Rhoda Abbott (1873–1946), only female passenger to go down with the Titanic and survive
- Rhoda Anstey (1865–1936), British tax resister, suffragist and physical education teacher
- Rhoda Billings (1937–2025), American lawyer and justice of the North Carolina Supreme Court
- Rhoda Campbell Chase (1881–1959), American artist and children's book illustrator
- Rhoda Haas Goldman (1924–1996), American philanthropist and heiress
- Rhoda Lavinia Goodell (1839–1880), the first woman licensed to practice law in Wisconsin
- Rhoda Pitchlynn Howell (1814–1911), Choctaw rancher and community leader
- Rhoda Levine (1932 or 1933–2026), American opera director and choreographer
- Rhoda Bubendey Métraux (1914–2003), anthropologist
- Rhoda Holmes Nicholls (1854–1930), British-born American painter
- Rhoda Pritzker (1914–2007), British-American philanthropist
- Rhoda Richards (1784–1879), wife of Mormon leader Joseph Smith and, after his death, Brigham Young
- Rhoda Sutherland (1907–1989), British academic
- Rhoda Wise (1888–1948), American alleged stigmatist

== Fictional characters ==
- Rhoda Dendron, on the animated television series Darkwing Duck
- Rhoda Morgenstern, title character of the television show Rhoda
- Rhoda Penmark, in William March's novel The Bad Seed

== See also ==
- Rhonda
