= Harold Chase =

Harold Chase may refer to:

- Hal Chase (Harold Homer Chase, 1883–1947), Major League Baseball player
- Harold H. Chase (1912–1976), American politician
- Harold W. Chase (1922–1982), American political scientist, general, and Defense Department official
