= Vaginal syringe =

Historical medical device

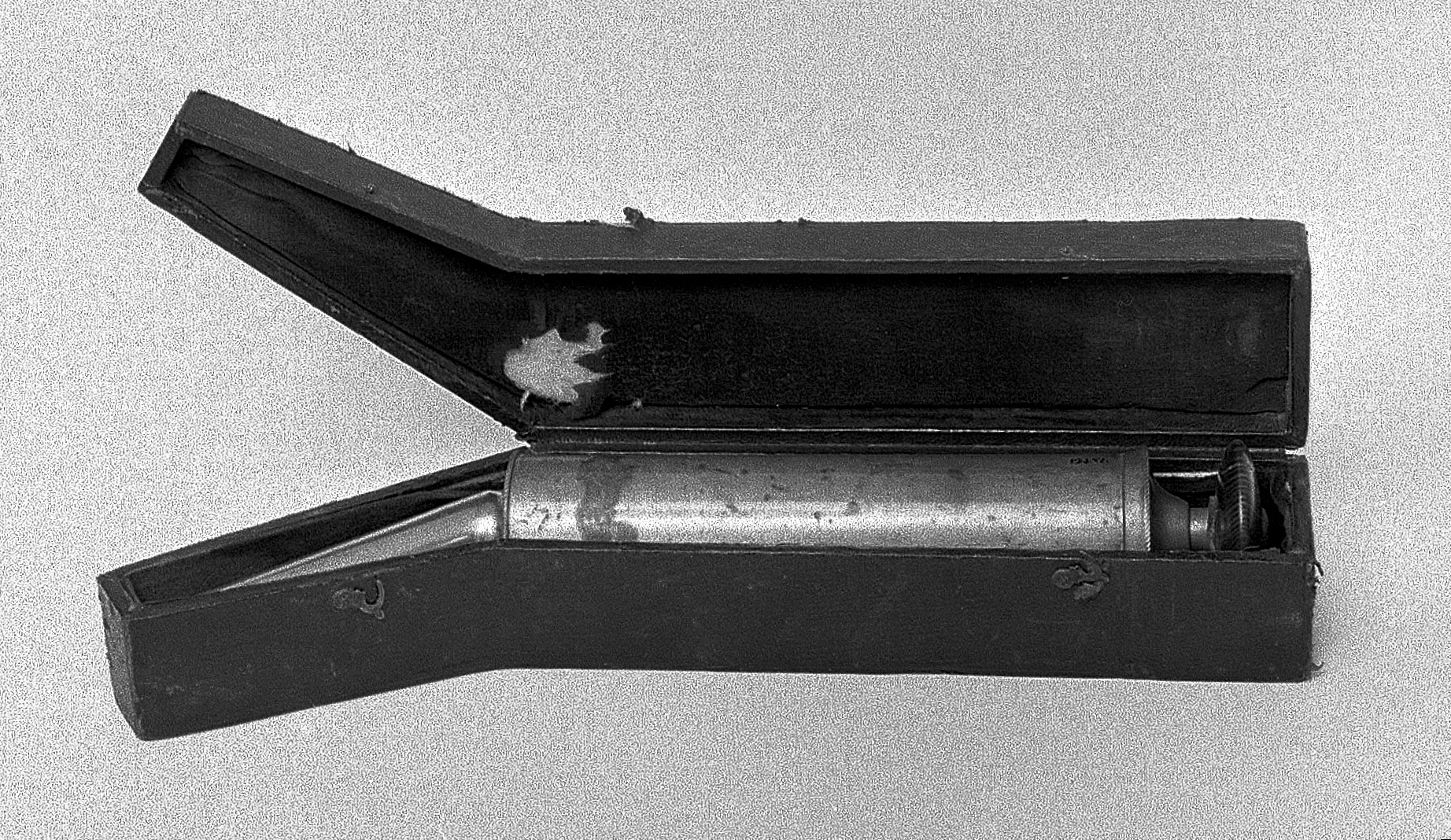
Pewter vaginal syringe in case, 19th century.

A vaginal syringe was an object used in the 19th century in the Western world for douching, treating diseases and for birth control. Vaginal syringes were fairly common at the time, but were not openly discussed because of taboos about discussing feminine hygiene. Vaginal syringes were most often made of metal, glass or, later, Bakelite.

== History ==
Vaginal syringes were marketed under various names, such as the ones made by the E. Edwards and Company of New York called "Lady's Friend" or the "Diamond Syringe No. 10." It was important for manufacturers to be vague in advertising because they could be arrested on obscenity charges, like Ezra Heywood was for advertising a vaginal syringe in his newspaper in 1882. His involvement in the issue led his wife, Angela Heywood to speak openly about birth control and feminine hygiene as a woman's "natural right." Others, like Sarah Chase, were arrested for selling vaginal syringes as a method of birth control. Vaginal syringes have been recorded in paintings by the 17th century artist, Jan Steen. Women have created and patented vaginal syringes for use as birth control as early as the 1879 model developed by Ann Palmer.

== Treating disease and douching ==
Vaginal syringes were used to treat maladies such as leucorrhea or disease of the "pelvic viscera" by injecting water or water and chemicals into the vagina. Vaginal syringes were also used to treat menstrual cramps.

The vaginal syringe was also used to promote the Victorian notion that douching was an appropriate method of feminine hygiene. By the 1930s, "many reputable gynecologists" were reporting that "habitual use of a vaginal syringe" was unhealthy.

== Birth control ==
The vaginal syringe as a method of birth control was available to women in the early nineteenth century. In the 1860s, Henry Dyer Grindle, advocated using vaginal syringes for the application of spermicide into the vagina after sexual intercourse. Women used different types of spermicides with the vaginal syringes including alum, chloride of zinc, baking soda, vinegar, borax, white oak bark, carbolic acid and other chemical combinations. Some chemicals which could be used as a douche were "capable of inducing an abortion."

== See also ==
- Birth control
- Syringes
