= George Chase =

George Chase may refer to:

- George W. Chase (died 1867), U.S. Representative from New York
- George H. Chase (1843–1918), U.S. politician from Arizona
- George Colby Chase (1844–1919), American academic
- George Henry Chase (1874–1952), American archeologist
- George Chase (bishop) (1886–1971), master of Selwyn College, Cambridge
- George S. Chase (1909–1972), American composer for film and library music
- George Francis Chase (1848–1925), U.S. Army officer
