= Paul Chase =

Paul Chase may refer to:

- Paul Chase (educator), dean of the University of Wisconsin
- Paul A. Chase (1895–1963), Associate Justice of the Vermont Supreme Court
- Paul Ashley Chase (1878–1946), founding executive of Warner Brothers Pictures
