= Laura Emeline Eames Chase =

American dentist and writer (1856–1917)

Laura Emeline Eames Chase (1856–1917), one of the few women dentists in St. Louis, Missouri in the 1890s, was the first female member of the American Dental Association.

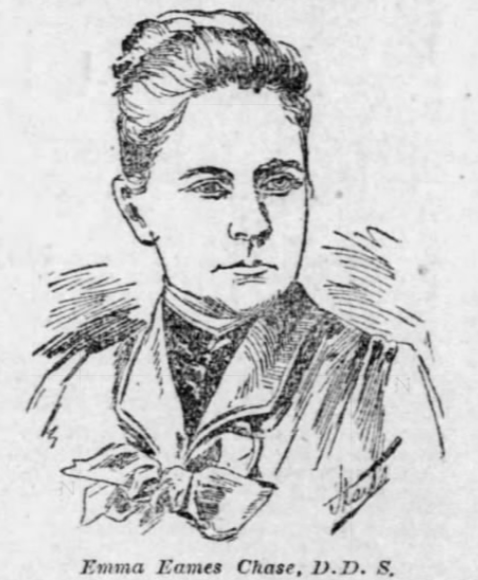
Emma Eames Chase, DDS

== Birth and early life ==
Laura Emeline Eames was born on February 12, 1856, and died October 12, 1917. She also used the name Emma Eames Chase.

The Eames family were living near Lebanon, Tennessee, when counted on the 1860 Census; they remained there until 1862. She married the artist Henry Seymour Chase Jr. on January 23, 1877, in St. Louis. She and her husband were living with her parents in St Louis, Missouri when counted on the 1880 census. Her daughter, Rhoda Campbell Chase, became an artist and illustrator. Emma and Harry's son, Irwin Chase, was the designer of the a small boat known as a "sea wasp" or "Chaser"; at least 300 of them were sold to the British for hunting enemy submarines in World War I.

== Dental practice ==
Chase is reported to be the first woman accepted as a full member of the American Dental Association and wrongly as the only woman dentist in St. Louis, Missouri in the 1890s. There were actually other female dentists practicing in St. Louis at the time the article was written.

An 1896 interview in the St. Louis Dispatch provides background information on Chase and her dental practice. She stated her father had been a dentist. She graduated from Iowa State University dental school in 1889 and used the distinction D.D.S. The same article provided information on the appearance of the Chase household that also included the doctor's practice: "the walls were covered with the work of Mrs. Chase's late husband."

== Other organizations ==
Chase was a member of the Daughters of the American Revolution.
