= Stephen Chase =

Stephen Chase may refer to:

- Stephen Chase (American football) (1874–1968), college football coach
- Stephen Chase (politician), American politician from Maine
- Stephen Chase (actor) (1902–1982), American film and television actor

== See also ==
- Steve Chase, American social justice activist
- Stephan Chase (1945–2019), British actor
- Steve Case (born 1958), American businessman
