= Harry Chase =

Harry Chase may refer to:

- Harry Chase (artist) (1853–1889), American painter
- Harry B. Chase (born 1947), Canadian politician in the Alberta legislature
- Harrie B. Chase (1889–1969), judge of the United States Court of Appeals for the Second Circuit
- Harry Woodburn Chase (1883–1955), American university president
- Harry Alonzo Chase (1883–1935), photographer of Lawrence of Arabia

== See also ==
- Henry Chase (disambiguation)
