= Mary Chase =

Mary Chase may refer to:

- Mary Agnes Chase (1869–1963), American botanist
- Mary Catherine Chase (1835–?), American Catholic nun and writer
- Mary Nettie Chase (1863--1959), American educator, suffragist and peace activist
- Mary Chase Peckham (1839–1893), American author and reformer
- Mary Chase (playwright) (1906–1981), American author of fourteen plays, including Harvey
- Mary Ellen Chase (1887–1973), American educator, scholar, and regional author

== See also ==
- Chase (surname)
- Mary Chase Perry Stratton (1867–1961), American ceramic artist
