= Judge Chase =

Judge Chase may refer to:

- Harrie B. Chase (1889–1969), judge of the United States Court of Appeals for the Second Circuit
- Jackson B. Chase (1890–1974), judge of the fourth judicial district court of Nebraska
- Ray P. Chase (1880–1948), municipal judge of Anoka, Minnesota
- Thomas Chase (died 1449), 15th-century judge who served as Lord Chancellor of Ireland

== See also ==
- Adrian Chase, fictional judge in DC Comics media
- Justice Chase (disambiguation)
