= James Chase =

James Chase may refer to:

- James Mitchell Chase (1891–1945), member of the U.S. House of Representatives from Pennsylvania
- James Chase (apothecary) (1636–1717), Apothecary to the Crown and a member of parliament for Great Marlow
- James Everett Chase (1914–1987), American politician
- James Hadley Chase (1906–1985), English writer
