= Richard Chase (disambiguation) =

Richard Chase (1950–1980) was an American cannibalistic serial killer, mass murderer, and necrophile.

Richard Chase may also refer to:

- J. Richard Chase (1930–2010), president of Biola University, and of Wheaton College
- Richard B. Chase, professor of operations management
- Richard Chase (folklorist) (1904–1988), American folklorist
- Richard Chase, poker player in 2006 World Series of Poker results

== See also ==
- Rick Chase (1957–2002), disc jockey
