= Howard Chase =

Howard Chase may refer to:

- Howard Chase (chemical engineer), British academic and chemical engineer
- Howard B. Chase (1884–1973), British-born Canadian trade union leader and president of the Canadian Broadcasting Corporation
- W. Howard Chase (1910–2003), founding member of the Public Relations Society of America
- H. Stephen Chase (1903–1969), American financier and president of Wells Fargo
