= Henry Chase =

Henry Chase may refer to:

- Henry Seymour Chase Jr. (1853–1889), American marine artist
- Henry B. Chase (1870–1961), mayor of Huntsville, Alabama
- Henry A. Chase (1841–?), member of the Wisconsin State Assembly
- Henry Chase (1860s politician) (died 1871), member of the Wisconsin State Assembly

== See also ==
- Harry Chase (disambiguation)
