= Allan Chase (writer) =

American writer and scholar

- Born: Allan Chase; 1913; New York, U.S.
- Died: 1993 (aged 79–80)
- Awards: Cleveland Foundation's Anisfield-Wolf Book Award (1978),

Allan Chase (1913–1993) was an American writer and independent scholar. He was born in New York City in 1913.

== Written works ==
In 1943 Chase published Falange: The Axis Secret Army in the Americas. The book was reviewed briefly for Foreign Affairs by Robert Gale Woolbert, describing it as documenting an "investigation into the pro-Axis activities of the Spanish Falange organization in Latin America and the Philippine Islands." Chase followed this with two novels, The Five Arrows (1944) and Shadow of a Hero (1949).

Later in his career, Chase turned to non-fiction with a three-book series. In 1971 Chase published The Biological Imperatives: Health Politics and Human Survival. The second book, The Legacy of Malthus: The Social Costs of the New Scientific Racism, was published in 1977. The third, Magic Shots: A Human and Scientific Account of the Long and Continuing Struggle to Eradicated Infectious Diseases by Vaccination was published in 1982.

The Legacy of Malthus documents "the function of scientific racism in American Life". Chase describes his book as "the first comprehensive account of scientific racism---its origins in the Industrial Revolution, its theorists, its propagandists, and its destructive effects on past and present American life." He introduces the book with Thomas Malthus, the 19th century British scholar whose simple and commonly questioned assertions about population growth and food supply inspired scholars throughout the 19th century. The book continues by describing the influence of Malthus on Social Darwinism and Eugenics, two discredited scientific theories that were prominent in the European Fascist and Nazi movements that fed into World War II, under the influence of American scientists. It goes on by asserting that scientific racism did not end with the end of the war, but continued in public attitudes and policies that are harder to track. George M. Fredrickson, who reviewed the book for The New York Times, wrote "this book should he read and read widely because of the way it thoroughly discredits the pernicious idea that most social problems are biological In origin." The Legacy of Malthus received the Cleveland Foundation's Anisfield-Wolf Book Award for Nonfiction in 1978. The award recognizes "important contributions to our understanding of racism and human diversity".

In 1983 Chase published The Truth about STD: The Old Ones-herpes and Other New Ones-The Primary Causes-the Available Cures.

== Other work and senate testimony ==
On July 12, 1953, Chase testified before a private session of the Senate Permanent Subcommittee on Investigations, of the Committee on Government Operations, Senator Joseph R. McCarthy presiding. Chase was questioned on his service to the American Committee on Spanish Freedom and his brief membership in the Communist Party. The record of his testimony concludes with the committee agreeing to keep the testimony private, out of consideration for Chase's public reputation as an author.

Chase later worked in television. He wrote one episode of 77 Sunset Strip (1960), writing as Allen Chasen. His credits also include an episode of This Is The Life (1961) and an episode of The Defenders (1964). Chase was co-creator and writer for three episodes of Days of Our Lives. (1965).

The University of Illinois maintains an archive of manuscripts and materials from Chase's work.
