= Robert Chase =

Robert Chase may refer to:

- Robert Chase (House), a character on the Fox medical drama House
- Robert Chase (businessman) (1938–2023), British businessman and chairman of Norwich City Football Club
- Robert A. Chase (1923–2024), American surgeon, researcher and educator
- Robert R. Chase (1948–2025), science fiction author
- Robert William Chase (1852–1927), British ornithologist, businessman, and philanthropist
- Rob Chase (born 1953), American politician, Washington state representative
