= Cheryl Chase =

Cheryl Chase may refer to:

- Cheryl Chase (activist) (born 1956), American activist
- Cheryl Chase (actress) (born 1958), American actress
- Cheryl Chase (politician) (born 1953), American politician
