= Helen C. Chase =

American public health statistician

- Education: Hunter College; Columbia University; UC Berkeley School of Public Health
- Scientific career
- Fields: Statistics
- Workplaces: New York State Department of Health; National Center for Health Statistics; National Academy of Sciences; Social Security Administration

Helen C. Chase was an American public health statistician.

== Early life ==
Chase graduated from Hunter College in 1938, earned a master's degree from Columbia University in 1951, and completed a doctorate in the UC Berkeley School of Public Health at the University of California, Berkeley in 1961.

== Career ==
She worked for the New York State Department of Health beginning in 1948, becoming principal biostatistician there in 1957. In 1963 she moved to the National Center for Health Statistics (NCHS), and in December 1963 she was named as the head of the Mortality Statistics Branch of the NCHS Division of Vital Statistics. She later worked as director of research for the Association of Schools of Allied Health Professions before moving to the Institute of Medicine of the National Academy of Sciences around 1971, as a staff associate in biostatistics, then becoming a statistician in the Division of Health Insurance Studies of the Social Security Administration.

In 1972, as president of the Statistics Section of the American Public Health Association (APHA), she wrote the first history of the section, The Statistics Section of the American Public Health Association, 1908-1972. She also chaired the APHA Joint Committee on National Data Resources in Epidemiology & Statistics from 1973 to 1977. The American Statistical Association named her as a Fellow of the American Statistical Association in 1974.
