= Rhoda (biblical figure) =

Biblical figure

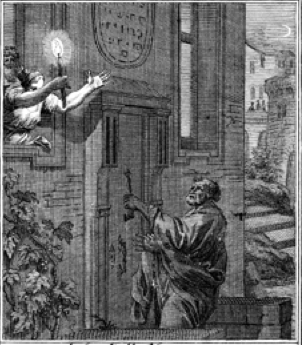
Peter Returns by Johann Christoph Weigel, 1695. Rhoda is in the upper left of the woodcut.

Rhoda (Biblical Greek: Ῥόδη, romanized: Rhodē) is a woman mentioned once in the New Testament. She appears only in Acts 12:12–15. Rhoda was the first person to hear Peter after God freed him from prison, but no one believed her account that Peter was at the door because they knew he had been put in prison and couldn't believe that he had actually been freed.

== Biblical account ==
Rhoda (whose name means "rose") was a girl (Biblical Greek: παιδίσκη) living in the house of Mary, the mother of John Mark. Many biblical translations state that she was a 'maid' or 'servant girl'. After Peter was miraculously released from prison, he went to the house and knocked on the door. Rhoda came to answer it, and when she heard Peter's voice, she was so overjoyed that she rushed to tell the others and forgot to open the door for him. She told the group of Christians who were praying that Peter was there. They did not believe her at first and told her she was "out of her mind." When she kept insisting that it was Peter, they said, "He is his angel." Yet Peter kept on knocking, and eventually, they opened the door for him.

== Scholarly interpretation ==
Peter had walked out of a prison chained to, and guarded by, Roman soldiers and confined behind secure walls; yet he was unable to get past a gate because a servant girl was too excited to open it for him. Christian historian Jaroslav Pelikan suggests that it is "difficult not to smile when reading this little anecdote," while biblical scholar F. F. Bruce says that the scene is "full of vivid humor." Pastor and theologian John Gill surmised that Rhoda recognized Peter's voice because she had "often heard him preach and converse [with Mary's] family". However, theologians Donald Fay Robinson and Warren M. Smaltz have suggested that the incident involving Rhoda really represents an idealized account of the death of St. Peter, which may have occurred in a Jerusalem prison in 44 AD.

Bruce Malina and John J. Pilch note that "Rhoda's behavior, both the surprised absentmindedness and the running, are considered humorous." Classicist Steve Reece traces both the name Rhoda and her eccentric behavior back to the stock characters and stock scenes of Greek New Comedy. Margaret Aymer suggests more generally that the humor is due to Rhoda's low social status and enslavement; Aymer states that "Rhoda reminds us that, even in the Christian assembly, class oppression continues."

Writing from a feminist perspective, Kathy Chambers argues that the narrative demonstrates "how Christian adaptations of comedic tropes challenged the dominant cultural construction of status and gender, of ecclesial authority, slaves, and women." Chambers connects this story to the fulfillment in Acts 2 of the prophecy of Joel 2 that women and slaves would prophesy. Although "Rhoda lacked the necessary authority to have her message taken seriously because of her status of both woman and slave," she had enough courage and faith to keep insisting that it was Peter.

== See also ==
- Rose (given name)
- The Bible and humor
- Acts
- Peter
