= Justice Chase =

Justice Chase may refer to:

United States Supreme Court

- Samuel Chase (1741–1811), associate justice of the United States Supreme Court
- Salmon P. Chase, chief justice of the United States Supreme Court

U.S. state supreme courts

- Dudley Chase (1771–1846), chief justice of the Vermont Supreme Court
- Emory A. Chase (1854–1921), justice of the New York Supreme Court and a judge of the New York Court of Appeals
- Harrie B. Chase (1889–1969), associate justice of the Vermont Supreme Court
- Jeremiah Chase (1748–1828), associate justice of the Court of Appeals of Maryland
- Paul A. Chase (1895–1963), associate justice of the Vermont Supreme Court

== See also ==
- Judge Chase (disambiguation)
