= Zanna Chase =

Marine chemist

- Education: Columbia University
- Awards: ARC Future Fellowship 2013
- Scientific career
- Workplaces: University of Tasmania
- Thesis: Trace elements as regulators (Fe) and recorders (U, Pa, Th, Be) of biological productivity in the ocean (2001)

Zanna Chase is an ocean-going professor of chemical oceanography and paleoceanography at the Institute of Marine and Antarctic Science, University of Tasmania, Australia. She has undertaken over 20 voyages on research vessels, and her areas of expertise are Antarctic paleoclimate, marine carbon cycle, radionuclides in the ocean, sediment geochemistry, paleoceanography, and marine biogeochemistry. In 2013 she was awarded an ARC Future Fellowship.

== Education and career ==
She completed her undergraduate studies in mathematics and biology at McGill University in Canada in 1993. She then completed her master's degree in biological oceanography at McGill University in 1996 working on how iron controls marine protozoans. She undertook her PhD in chemical oceanography and paleoceanography at Lamont–Doherty Earth Observatory where she worked on trace elements and primary production in marine ecosystems. Prior to joining the newly formed Institute of Marine and Antarctic Science, University of Tasmania in 2010, she was on the faculty at Oregon State University. The main themes of her work have been focused in oceanography, glacial period, and phytoplankton.

== Research ==
Her research focusses on the interaction between chemical cycles and biological activity, the study of biogeochemistry. She is interested in how the biogeochemical changes in the Southern Ocean influence climate, and are also affected by climate, in the modern ocean. She also studies past biogeochemical changes in the ocean, the study of paleoceanography. She has written 137 research works, and a significant focus of her work has been on understanding the role of iron as a micronutrient in the oceans. Another focus of her work is on the exchange of carbon dioxide between the oceans and the atmosphere and the role of carbon sequestration in the oceans on controlling natural climate changes over the glacial-interglacial cycles. She uses a range of geochemical proxies analysed on ocean waters and sediment cores including long-lived, naturally occurring radioisotopes like thorium isotopes to reconstruct particle flux, and redox-sensitive metals such as manganese and uranium to reconstruct ocean oxygen levels. She is also involved in research to improve the understanding of trace metal proxies through participation in the international Geotraces program. She has participated in more than 20 voyages on a range of different research vessels, including the Australian blue water vessel RV Investigator.

== Selected publications ==
- Coale, Kenneth H.; Johnson, Kenneth S.; Chavez, Francisco P.; Buesseler, Ken O.; Barber, Richard T.; Brzezinski, Mark A.; Cochlan, William P.; Millero, Frank J.; Falkowski, Paul G.; Bauer, James E.; Wanninkhof, Rik H. (2004-04-16). "Southern Ocean Iron Enrichment Experiment: Carbon Cycling in High- and Low-Si Waters". Science. 304 (5669): 408–414. Bibcode:2004Sci...304..408C. doi:10.1126/science.1089778. PMID 15087542. S2CID 8572001.
- Chase, Zanna; Anderson, Robert F.; Fleisher, Martin Q.; Kubik, Peter W. (2002-11-30). "The influence of particle composition and particle flux on scavenging of Th, Pa and Be in the ocean". Earth and Planetary Science Letters. 204 (1): 215–229. Bibcode:2002E&PSL.204..215C. doi:10.1016/S0012-821X(02)00984-6. ISSN 0012-821X.
- Chase, Zanna; Anderson, Robert F.; Fleisher, Martin Q.; Kubik, Peter W. (2003-03-01). "Accumulation of biogenic and lithogenic material in the Pacific sector of the Southern Ocean during the past 40,000 years". Deep Sea Research Part II: Topical Studies in Oceanography. US Southern Ocean JGOFS Program (AESOPS): Part III. 50 (3): 799–832. Bibcode:2003DSRII..50..799C. doi:10.1016/S0967-0645(02)00595-7. ISSN 0967-0645.
- Chase, Zanna; Strutton, Peter G.; Hales, Burke (2007). "Iron links river runoff and shelf width to phytoplankton biomass along the U.S. West Coast". Geophysical Research Letters. 34 (4). Bibcode:2007GeoRL..34.4607C. doi:10.1029/2006GL028069. ISSN 1944-8007. S2CID 13092535.
