= Oscar Chase =

American lawyer

Academic background
- Education: New York University (BA; Yale University (JD)

Academic work
- Discipline: Law
- Sub-discipline: Civil rights law Employment law Civil procedure
- Institutions: Brooklyn Law School; New York University

Oscar G. Chase is an American legal scholar who is the Russell D. Niles Professor of Law at the New York University School of Law.

== Education ==
Chase earned a degree in English literature at New York University in 1960 and completed his legal studies at Yale Law School in 1963.

== Career ==
From 1964 to 1966, Chase served in the military. After his military service, Chase worked as general counsel for the Lower West Side Community Corporation and a legal aid organization, Community Action for Legal Services.

Chase began his career in legal scholarship as a professor of law at Brooklyn Law School from 1972 to 1978 and began teaching at the New York University School of Law in 1980, where he was later named Russell D. Niles Professor of Law.

Chase is the author of Law, Culture, and Ritual. He has been quoted as an expert in civil rights, civil procedure, and employment law. In 2018, Chase was one of over 2,000 legal scholars to sign a letter urging the United States Senate to reject Brett Kavanaugh's Supreme Court nomination.

== Personal life ==
Chase is married to Jane Monell, also a lawyer. Chase successfully represented Monell in the 1978 Supreme Court case Monell v. Department of Social Services of the City of New York.
