= Claudia Chase =

American politician

Claudia Chase served three terms in the New Hampshire House of Representatives.

In 2004, Chase, a Democrat from Francestown, was victorious in her first try for elective office. A recount determined that she won by four votes after the original tally had her Republican opponent winning by 31 votes.
