= Governor Chase =

Governor Chase may refer to:

- Ira Joy Chase (1834–1895), 22nd Governor of Indiana
- Salmon P. Chase (1808–1873), 23rd Governor of Ohio
