= Eleanor Barrow Chase =

American social worker and civic leader

Eleanor Barrow Chase (December 21, 1918 – May 31, 2002) was an American social worker and civic leader in Spokane, Washington. She was particularly active in organizations devoted to young people and to education, and was the first African American woman on the board of trustees at Eastern Washington University, where she was instrumental in securing EWU's admission as a member of the Big Sky Conference in 1987. She also served on the board of trustees at Whitworth College.

== Early life ==
Eleanor's grandfather, Peter Barnabas Barrow, was born a slave in Virginia. He fled to freedom and "fought for the Union army as they marched through the South." He served in the state legislature representing Vicksburg, Mississippi during Reconstruction for two terms. An old friend named Fred Wilson had come to Spokane in 1886 and started a farm in Deer Lake, so Peter decided to follow him in 1889 or 1890, the year of or the year after the Great Spokane Fire. Upon moving to Spokane, he became a minister and helped establish Calvary Baptist Church, Spokane's first black church. Her grandmother's name was Julia Barrow, and they had six sons and one daughter. Peter died in a streetcar accident in Tacoma where he had gone for a church gathering; he died before Eleanor was born.

Eleanor's father, Charles, was thirteen or fourteen at the time of the move. He got a job for The Spokesman-Review as a boy as a "printer's devil", or helper. He became a printer and editor and learned his trade at the Old Spokane Business College. He owned the Quality Printing Company and started a newspaper, the Spokane Citizen, which he edited from 1908 to 1913. Although the Citizen ceased publication in 1913, the printing company continued until Charles Barrow's death in 1950.

Eleanor Elizabeth Barrow was born December 21, 1918, in Spokane, Washington. She attended Edison Grade School, and graduated as valedictorian at Libby Junior High, where she also ran track. She attended Lewis and Clark High School, where she ranked very high academically and was also a guest soloist for the Honor Society and a member of the school's glee club, the high school girl reserves, and the Phyllis Wheatley Club. She served as president of the Young People's Fellowship of St. Thomas, where she was also an organist. Barrow graduated with honors from Lewis and Clark High School in 1937.

Barrow began her college education at Washington State College and graduated in 1941 from Whitworth College, where she received a bachelor's degree in Music (Voice and Piano), graduating magna cum laude.

== Professional career ==
Although her talent as a singer was sufficient that she had envisioned pursuing it as her career, after her marriage to James Everett Chase in 1942 and the birth of their son, Roland, the following year, she elected to remain a homemaker while the boy was young. Once Roland reached middle school, Chase entered the workforce, working as a social worker for the Spokane office of the State Department of Public Assistance from 1954–1970, and as an adoption and juvenile court officer for dependent children at Spokane Juvenile Court from 1970–1979. She was praised for her advocacy: one of the judges who presided over cases in which she testified later commented that "Eleanor has always been very pro-children and an advocate of good parenting skills. I never knew a client who was less than impressed with her." Her contributions in this line of work led to the naming of the Eleanor Chase House, a work release program for women in Spokane.

== Service as a trustee at Eastern Washington University and Whitworth College ==
Eleanor Chase was appointed to Eastern Washington University's board of trustees on March 19, 1979, and her initial appointment lasted until March 12, 1985. She served a second term, which ended in 1992. Chase was the first woman of color on the board of trustees, replacing Jerome Page, who had been Eastern's first black trustee. During one of her two terms as the Chair of Eastern Washington University's board of trustees, the university acquired what would come to be known as the Spokane Center, which housed Master's programs in Public Administration, Computer Science, and Communication Studies. In a report given by Trustees Chair Jean Beschel, Chase was also credited as being instrumental in Eastern Washington University's acceptance into the Big Sky Conference.

Previous to her appointment to the board at Eastern, she served on the board of trustees for Whitworth College, her alma mater.

== Civic involvement ==
Chase was very active in Spokane municipal and community organizations, serving as a member (and often a board member) of a range of organizations that included the local YWCA, the Spokane Zoological Society, the Altrusa Club, the North Spokane Business and Professional Women, the Race Relations Council, and the local chapter of the NAACP. She served on Deaconess Medical Center's ethics committee, was director of the Spokane Centennial Committee, and was the Grand Worthy Matron of the Prince Hall Grand Chapter, Order of Eastern Star. In the spring of 1988, she received an award from Spokane's Optimist Club as a "Friend of Youth". In a 1991 magazine profile, Chase reflected on her many service projects, and noted that she was "proudest of ... her involvement with the K-12 Education Strategies program of Momentum 91. Her committee is concentrating on early childhood development and has just formed an early childhood information and coordination center to help businesses identify resources for employees with children."

== Personal and family life ==
When Barrow was 15, she met Jim Chase (who later became Spokane's first African American mayor). After graduating from Whitworth College, the two were married in 1942 at Holy Trinity Episcopal Church in Spokane's West Central neighborhood. Their son, Roland, was born a year later. It was well known locally that Chase was a talented singer in her youth and throughout her time as a music student at Whitworth.
