= Ray Chase =

Ray Chase may refer to:

- Ray P. Chase (1880–1948), U.S. Representative from Minnesota
- Ray Chase (voice actor) (born 1987), American actor
