= Samuel Chase (disambiguation) =

Samuel Chase (1741–1811) was a signer of the Declaration of Independence and justice of the United States Supreme Court.

Samuel Chase may also refer to:

- Samuel Chase (New York politician) (1789–1838), U.S. congressman from New York
- USS Samuel Chase, Arthur Middleton class attack transport crewed by the United States Coast Guard during World War II
- SS Samuel Chase, a Liberty ship
- Samuel T. Chase (1868–1937), American tennis player

== See also ==
- Samuel Chase House, West Newbury, Massachusetts
