= Ken Chase =

Ken Chase may refer to:

- Ken Chase (baseball) (1913–1985), American Major League Baseball player
- Ken Chase (make-up artist) (born 1942), American make-up artist
