= Michael Reynolds (footballer) =

Australian rules footballer

Personal information
- Full name: Michael Reynolds
- Born: 30 July 1963 (age 63)
- Original teams: Friends School, Hobart
- Height: 186 cm (6 ft 1 in)
- Weight: 81 kg (179 lb)

Playing career^{1}
Years	Club	Games (Goals)
1983–1986	Melbourne	22 (20)
- ^{1} Playing statistics correct to the end of 1986.

Michael Reynolds (born 30 July 1963) is a former Australian rules footballer who played with Melbourne in the Victorian Football League (VFL).
