= James Everett Chase =

American politician (1914–1987)

37th Mayor of Spokane
- In office December 30, 1981 – December 30, 1985
- Preceded by: Ron Bair
- Succeeded by: Vicki McNeill

Personal details
- Born: James Everett Chase; March 29, 1914 Wharton, Texas, U.S.
- Died: May 19, 1987 (aged 73) Spokane, Washington, U.S.
- Resting place: Fairmount Memorial Park; Spokane, Washington
- Spouse(s): Eleanor Barrow Chase (1918–2002) (m.1942)
- Children: 1
- Profession: Politician, Businessman

James Everett Chase (March 29, 1914 – May 19, 1987) was an African American politician in Spokane, Washington. He was elected mayor in 1981 by a landslide 62 percent to 38 percent margin, and became the state's second African American mayor.

== Early life and work ==
Chase was born in Wharton, Texas and grew up in Ballinger, Texas. He came to Spokane in 1934, accompanied by two friends from Ballinger, Harry Blackwell and Elmo Dalbert. The three men moved to Spokane after completing a term of service with the Civilian Conservation Corps—after taking up residence in the city, they found employment in a hotel. Chase went on to run an auto body repair shop together with his friends. He was a co-owner of Blackwell and Chase Body and Fender Repair from 1940 to 1942, supervisor of the body repair shop at Geiger Field for the U.S.A.F. during World War II, and co-owner of Chase and Dalbert Body and Fender Repair from 1945 until his retirement in 1981.

== Civic involvement ==
For the entirety of the 1960s, Chase was the president of Spokane's branch of the NAACP. Under his leadership, the NAACP focused their attention in the specific areas of discrimination in housing, public accommodations, and employment. Chase and the NAACP of Spokane campaigned for investigations into claims of housing discrimination based on color. They went before the Washington State Board Against Discrimination (WSBAD) on May 4, 1961. The Board found several real estate companies guilty of discriminatory practices. In the 1960s in Spokane, some businesses "continued to restrict black trade." Chase and the NAACP took up the case of a visiting student at Gonzaga University who was denied service at a barber shop. Although this student was visiting, Chase and the NAACP used the opportunity to "bring exposure to this local public accommodations incident." The NAACP of Spokane, under Chase, encouraged African Americans to "file their employment complaints with the WSBAD." Though limited in their authority, the WSBAD investigated many claims of unfair employment practices in Spokane. In late 1969, Chase realized that "he was ready to pass the torch to a 'younger' activist with 'fresh ideas,'" and the office passed to another local activist, Joseph Trim.

== Service on the Spokane city council ==
He entered politics with his first run for city council in 1969, losing narrowly to Republican Margaret Leonard, who two years earlier had become the first woman elected to the council. He ran for council again in 1975, this time narrowly winning to become the first African American city council member in Spokane's history.

Chase quickly established himself as a critic of the council's inefficiency, raising objections at council meetings over the slow pace of the council's agenda and the wasted money that resulted from the council's inaction. He became well known for his emphasis on transparency in government, and for his advocacy for social services, particularly for young people: in both 1978 and 1979, Chase was very vocal in defense of the Spokane Area Youth Committee when the council considered cutting its funds, and at one point threatened to resign from the council if the measure had prevailed. He was re-elected in 1979 by a three-to-one margin and was the first council member to retain a seat in six years.

== Service as Spokane's mayor ==
On November 3, 1981, Chase became Spokane's first African American mayor. In a "low key" campaign against Wayne Guthrie, James Chase "garnered 72 percent of the vote." Mayor Chase had a leadership style that was different from anyone else. He was considered steady and honest with good helping of common sense, along with "dignity." Chase was extremely "careful to avoid political confrontations with his constituents." After his inauguration, Chase "hit the ground running." He instituted a "1% for Art" program, which put art in city buildings. This legacy of this program continues today in the Chase art gallery outside of City Hall. During his tenure as mayor, Chase helped Spokane "move beyond the race issue to accept an African American mayor." However, this didn't stop racial tensions from building.

In April 1983, Chase came under fire from equal rights groups for allowing a planned white supremacist group to rally in downtown Spokane. The Church of Jesus Christ–Christian Aryan Nations group, led by Richard Butler, was given a permit to "peaceably" assemble. The date for the rally was set for June 26, 1983, and was to meet at the clock tower in Riverfront Park. In spite of pressure from various civil rights groups to stop the rally on the claims that it would "endanger public safety, mayor Chase chose to follow the letter of the law. Mayor chase was quick to point out that "freedom of speech is the cornerstone of democracy," he also stated that: "First Amendment rights protect both white supremacists and minorities." Mayor Chase made it very clear that he was not intimidated by the group. He stated: "I'm not afraid of those guys, I'm going to that rally." With a major police force present, the rally eventually took place with relatively little violence.

With Chase's landslide victory, Spokane ushered in a new era of civil rights. His election gave hope to Black Spokanites, particularly elders in the community.

When his first term was coming to an end, Chase had back surgery that included a long and painful recovery. Chase announced that he would not be seeking another term. He remarked, "You hate to leave something that's going this good, you really do. The other part of it is, you're glad to leave something that's going this good. You know it will keep going on."

== Legacy ==
Over his career, Chase earned a number of accolades. In 1983, the Spokane Black Centennial Committee held their celebration in honor of James and his wife, Eleanor. Chase earned Eastern Washington University's President's Medal in 1985, while Governor Booth Gardener declared December 12, 1985 to be James Chase Day.

Chase is famed for the Chase Youth Commission, a group advocating youth issues within Spokane, including the Chase Youth Awards and the Chase Youth issues forum. The youth commission is considered as a city commission and allows 8 adults and 7 youth to join every year. Chase Middle School in Spokane is also named after him.

== Personal life ==
Shortly after arriving to Spokane, Chase joined an African Methodist Episcopal Church, where he sang baritone for the choir. He also played saxophone in a local jazz band. Chase met his future wife, Eleanor Barrow when she was 15 years old—they remained friends for a number of years, and were married in 1942 by Reverend Ernest Mason at Holy Trinity Episcopal Church in the West Central neighborhood of Spokane. Their first son, Roland, was born the following year. Chase died from cancer at age 73 at Sacred Heart Hospital in Spokane. His funeral at St. John's Episcopal Cathedral was attended by over one thousand mourners from all walks of life, and he was buried at Fairmount Memorial Park.

== See also ==
- List of first African-American mayors
