= Archibald Alderman Chase =

- Born: 16 September 1884; Jamalpur, India
- Died: 10 March 1917 (aged 32); Irles, France
- Burial place: Aveluy, France
- Military career
- Allegiance: United Kingdom
- Branch: British Army
- Service years: 1904–1917
- Rank: Lieutenant Colonel
- Commands: 80th Field Company, Royal Engineers; 8th Battalion, Royal Sussex Regiment
- Conflicts: World War I
- Awards: Distinguished Service Order; Mentioned in Despatches x3

Lieutenant-Colonel Archibald Alderman Chase DSO (16 September 1884 – 10 March 1917) was in Command of the 80th Field Company, Royal Engineers, and later, the 8th Battalion of the Royal Sussex Regiment during World War I. For his service in World War I, Chase was made a Companion of the Distinguished Service Order and was Mentioned in Despatches three times.

In March 1917, Chase and a fellow Officer were mortally wounded by a shell at Irles, France, carrying out a reconnaissance mission to dig assembly trenches in advance of the attack on the Loupart line. In a contribution to Chase’s obituary in The Times, Sir Ivor Maxse described Chase as ‘the very best type of British Officer in every respect. He was a real leader of men, as well as a thoughtful and most capable staff officer’.

== Life ==
Chase was born on 16 September 1884 in Jamalpur, India, the third son of William Hackett Chase and Priscilla Jane Chase, both originally from Eastbourne, England. He was educated at Bedford Modern School and the Royal Military Academy, Woolwich.

Chase graduated from Woolwich with a gold medal for obtaining the highest marks in his military subjects and was commissioned into the Royal Engineers on 29 July 1904. He was made Lieutenant on 23 March 1907 and he was later attached to the Indian Cavalry as a survey officer.

At the outbreak of World War I he came to France as Assistant Field Engineer with the 2nd Indian Cavalry Division having been promoted to Captain on 30 October 1914. After disembarking at Marseilles, he saw initial action in Orleans and for his service during the Fall of Thiepval he was appointed Major and put in command of the 80th Field Artillery, Royal Engineers.

Chase was made Lieutenant-Colonel on 11 January 1917 and given command of the 8th Battalion, Royal Sussex Regiment, the Division’s pioneer battalion. One of his first tasks was the completion of a light railway to evacuate the wounded.

In March 1917, in anticipation of an attack on the Loupart line, Chase and his fellow officer, Colonel H.M. Henderson of the 18th (Eastern) Division, were assessing where to dig assembly trenches at Irles, near Grandcourt. During the course of their reconnaissance they were hit by a German shell and both officers died. In a later description of the incident it was noted that Colonel Chase was ‘one of the finest types of British officers’ and was a ‘much loved commanding officer’.

Chase was buried with full military honours on 11 March 1917 in the military cemetery at Aveluy, France. The funeral service was conducted by The Rev. R. Douglas Canadine, Chaplain to the Forces, the 8th Royal Sussex Pioneers, who wrote that ‘he had laid to rest a very gallant soldier and gentlemen’. His obituary in The Times described him as ‘the very best type of British Officer in every respect. He was a real leader of men, as well as a thoughtful and most capable staff officer’. Sir Ivor Maxse further commented that Chase ‘possessed that quality which endeared him to all true soldiers, and did much to the division to which he was attached’.

Chase married Gladys Maude Waller, daughter of Crichton Waller, on 28 March 1910 in Delhi, India. He was survived by his wife, a son and a daughter.
