= Senator Chase =

Senator Chase may refer to:

== Members of the United States Senate ==
- Dudley Chase (1771–1846), U.S. Senator from Vermont from 1813 to 1817 and from 1825 to 1831
- Salmon P. Chase (1808–1873), U.S. Senator from Ohio from 1849 to 1855

== United States state senate members ==
- Arthur E. Chase (1930–2015), Massachusetts State Senate
- Champion S. Chase (1820–1898), Wisconsin State Senate
- De Lanson Alson Newton Chase (1875–1953), Kansas State Senate
- Enoch Chase (1809–1892), Wisconsin State Senate
- John B. Chase (1872–1960), Wisconsin State Senate
- Maralyn Chase (born 1942), Washington State Senate
- Norton Chase (1861–1922), New York State Senate
- Roland E. Chase (1867–1948), Virginia State Senate
- Stephen Chase (politician) (fl. 1840s), Maine State Senate
- Warren Chase (1813–1891), Wisconsin State Senate and California State Senate
