= Anthony Chase =

Academic specialist in human rights

Anthony Tirado Chase is a professor of Diplomacy and World Affairs at Occidental College in California.

== Research ==
Chase's research focuses on human rights, international organizations, and the politics of the Middle East.

== Published works ==
- Human Rights, Revolution, and Reform in the Muslim World (2012). ISBN 813092367X
- Human Rights in the Arab World: Independent Voices (co-edited with Amr Hamzawy, 2006). ISBN 9780812208849
- Routledge Handbook on Human Rights and the Middle East and North Africa (2017). ISBN 9781315750972
- Legitimizing Human Rights: Beyond Mythical Foundations and Into Everyday Resonances (Journal of Human Rights, 2013). doi:10.1080/14754835.2012.730914
- Human rights contestations: sexual orientation and gender identity (The International Journal of Human Rights, 2016) doi:10.1080/13642987.2016.1147432
