= Martha Jenks Chase =

Doll manufacturer

Martha Jenks Chase (née Martha Jenks; 1851–1925) was a doll designer, manufacturer, entrepreneur, and Progressive reformer based in Pawtucket, Rhode Island.

In contrast to the popular dolls of the day, which were often too heavy for small children and too fragile for play, Chase believed that softer, more durable dolls made of fabric would encourage a greater range of childhood play. Additionally, popular dolls often took the form of elegant little ladies; Chase believed that playing with dolls allowed children to practice parenting skills, and manufactured dolls that resembled babies.

The wife of a doctor, Chase also designed and manufactured dolls for use in hospitals to train nurses and doctors in proper care techniques. The first "Mrs. Chase" doll was tested at a Pawtucket hospital in 1911. A revised model was used at Hartford Hospital Training School in Connecticut, and was the first to feature an arm injection site, and an internal reservoir for urethral, vaginal, and rectal treatments.

The Chase Hospital Doll became a standard teaching method for health professionals, not only in the U.S., but also in Europe, Asia, and Latin America. The company produced several variations on the original doll. During World War II, the United States Army commissioned the Chase Company to make male mannequins for training medical corps personnel in hospital techniques.

Some of the original Chase Hospital Dolls can be found in medical and nursing museums.

In 1997, U.S. Postal Service commemorated the Chase doll.
