= Vera Chase =

Czech translator and author

Věra Chase (born 1970) is a Czech translator and author of poetry and fiction. She lives and works in Prague.

== Biography ==
Chase was raised in Prague in a literary family.

Chase's work has been called playful and "intensely physical" by Radio Prague.

Chase's poetry was used as the basis for the title song on the eponymous album, Elida, by Iva Bittová and Bang on a Can All Stars. Bittová says that she was inspired by the poem and its sense of eroticism and humor.

Chase was recognized for her writing with a 1997 Czech Book award and a 1998 Knižní klub award. Also in October 1997, Chase gave a lecture at Rutgers University. Her lecture, given with Karen von Kunes was called "Smuggling Verses: Czech Poetry Today."

== Books ==
- Bodypainting/Telokresba, bi-lingual short-story and poetry collection, Prague 1997
- Vasen pro broskve (Passion for Peaches), a post-modern novel (in Czech), Knizni klub, Prague 1998
- Eyeberries/Bobule, bi-lingual poetry collection, Sanskriti Prathisthan, New Delhi 1999
- Hypnoskop (Hypnoscope), collection of short-stories based on dreams (in Czech), Knizni klub/Prostor, Prague 1999
- Stava (Juice), erotic poetry collection (in Czech), Labyrint, Prague 2001
- Maso a pomerance (flesh and Oranges), short-story collection (in Czech), Mlada fronta, Prague 2007
- Tricet smrt celych jahoda (Thirty death point strawberry), poetry and short-story collection (in Czech), Jitro, Prague 2011

=== Translation ===
- Anne Michaels: Fugitive Pieces from English to Czech. Odeon, Prague 2000
- Nicola Barker: Wide Open from English to Czech, Odeon, Prague 2001

=== Anthologies ===
- Prague Tales, anthology of the Central Europe contemporary fiction, New Europe Writers 2007
- The Return of Kral Majales: Prague's International Literary Renaissance 1990-2010. Literararia Pragensia Books. 2010. ISBN 9788073083021.
