= Stephen Chase (American football) =

American football coach

Biographical details
- Born: November 6, 1874; Hanover, New Hampshire, U.S.
- Died: October 5, 1968 (aged 93); Dunedin, Florida, U.S.

Playing career

Track
- 1893–1895: Dartmouth

Coaching career (HC unless noted)

Football
- 1896: Knox (IL)

Administrative career (AD unless noted)
- 1896–1897: Knox (IL)

Head coaching record
- Overall: 2–6–1

Stephen Chase (July 28, 1874 – October 5, 1968) was an American college football coach. He served as the head coach at Knox College in Galesburg, Illinois for one season, in 1896, compiling a record of 2–6–1.

== Head coaching record ==
Year	Team	Overall	Bowl/playoffs
Knox Old Siwash (Independent) (1896)
1896	Knox	2–6–1	
Knox:		2–6–1	
Total:		2–6–1	
