= Jack Chase =

Jack Chase may refer to:

- Jack Chase (Irish boxer) (1904–?), Irish Olympic boxer
- Jack Chase (American boxer) (1914–1972), African-American middleweight

== See also ==
- John Chase (disambiguation)
