= William Chase =

William Chase may refer to:

- William Merritt Chase (1849–1916), American painter
- William Calvin Chase (1854–1921), African-American lawyer and newspaper editor
- William Martin Chase (1837–1918), justice of the Supreme Court of New Hampshire
- William C. Chase (1895–1986), American general
- William Henry Chase (1798–1870), Florida militia colonel
- William J.J. Chase, American architect of Atlanta, Georgia
- William St Lucien Chase (1856–1908), recipient of the Victoria Cross
- William Chase (entrepreneur) (born 1960), founder of the Tyrrells crisp brand
- William Henry Chase (Canadian entrepreneur) (1851–1933), entrepreneur and philanthropist in Nova Scotia, Canada
- Robert William Chase (1852–1927), British ornithologist

== See also ==
- William Chace (born 1938), American university president
