= Rhoda Campbell Chase =

American artist and book illustrator (1881–1959)

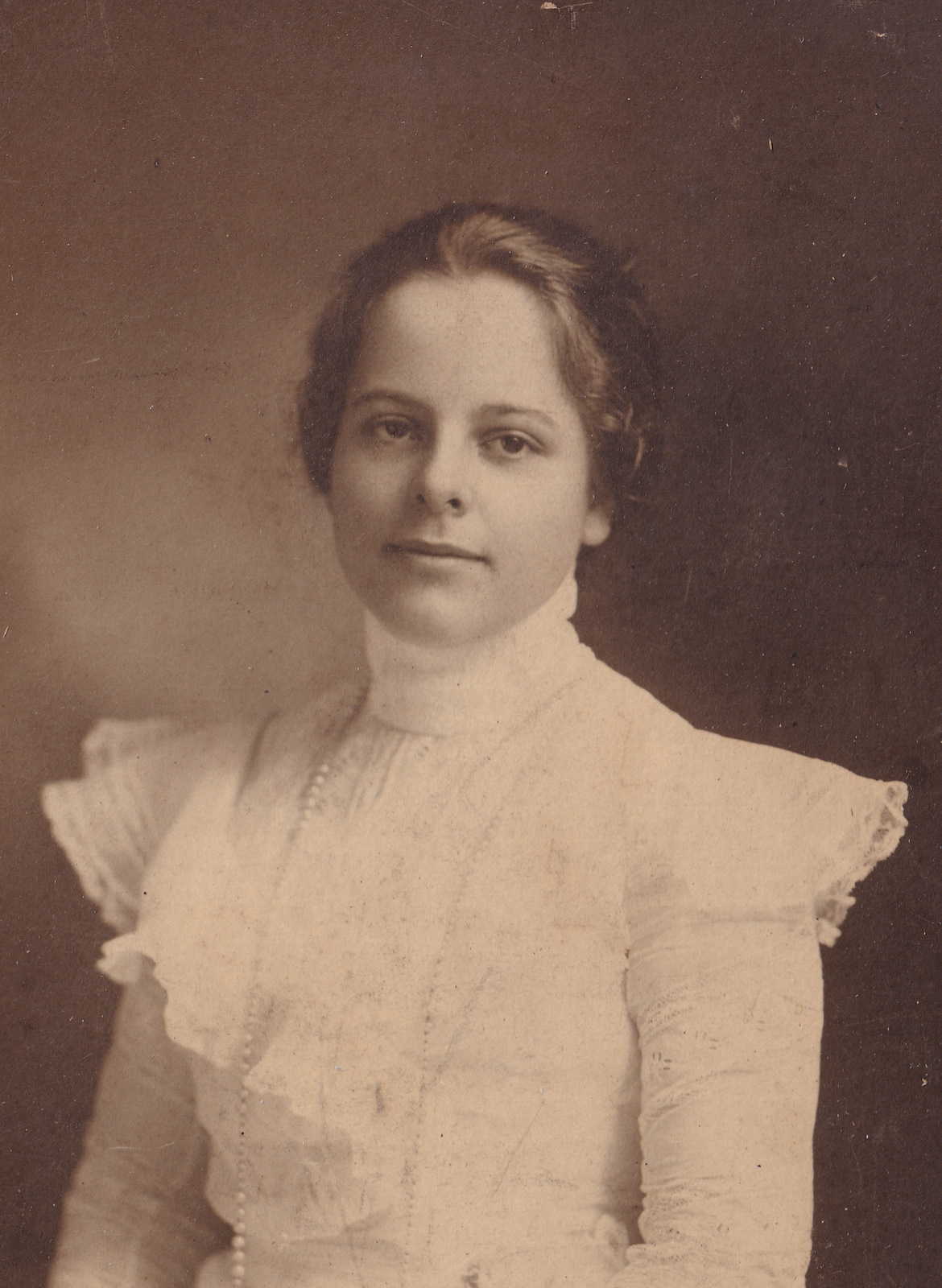
- Rhoda Campbell Chase, circa 1900
- Born: March 20, 1881; New Bedford, Massachusetts
- Died: August 11, 1959 (aged 78); Kingston Hospital, Kingston, New York

Rhoda Campbell Chase (March 20, 1881 – August 1, 1959) was an American artist and illustrator, mainly of children's books.

== Early life and education ==
Rhoda Chase was born on March 20, 1881 in New Bedford, Massachusetts. Her parents were Emma Eames Chase, a dentist, writer, and artist, and Harry Chase, a marine painter. She had a brother named Irwin Chase, who went on to become a designer and builder of PT boats.

Chase's family came from a long line of artists, dentists, and medical doctors, with her father's side of the family having medical doctors and dentists going back four generations. Her uncle, Frederick B. Chase, was a specialist in prosthetic dentistry. And her paternal grandfather, Henry Seymour Chase, both an M.D. and a D.D.S., was as Chair of Operative Surgery an instructor the Missouri State Dental School in St. Louis. Her mother was the first female member of the American Dental Association. Her cousin, Lyna Chase, also became an artist.

In 1899, Chase graduated from the Mary Institute in St. Louis. She attended the Monticello Seminary for three years. She later studied at the St. Louis School of Fine Arts. She was a member of the St. Louis Artists' Guild. In 1905, she won 4th place in a St. Louis Post Dispatch and Artists' Guild juried competition, for her piece "Christmas Morn".

== Career ==
Around 1906, Chase was part of arts and crafts movement in St. Louis. She worked with decorative leather. From 1906 to 1907, Chase lived abroad in Paris with her mother, where she studied art. During her time off from school in Paris, she painted in Holland.

In 1907, Chase returned to the United States, moving to New York City with her mother "for the benefit of [her mother's] health", along with a plan to open a studio in the city so that she could continue creating her art.

Around 1914, Chase moved to Woodstock, New York, where she continued to live for 45 years. She worked as an illustrator, including illustrating a children's book-record hybrid called the Bubble Book, a collection of traditional children's songs and accompanying music sung by Henry Burr. It sold 9000 copies in the first month it was released.

Chase died August 1, 1959, in Kingston Hospital in Kingston, New York.

== Gallery ==
Fourth Place prize-winning artwork Christmas Morn (1905)

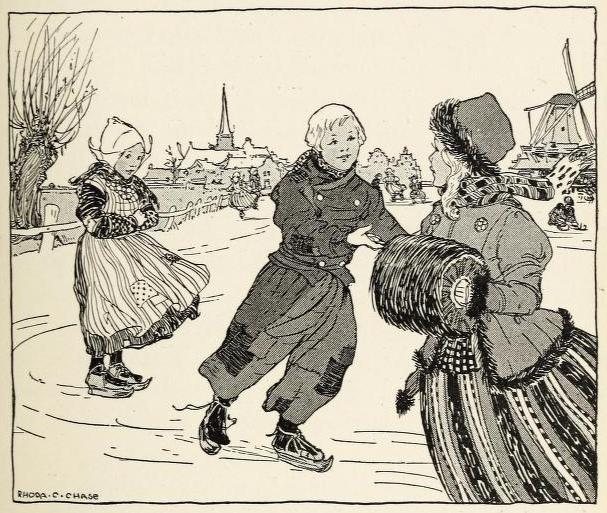
Illustration from The Merrill Readers: Fourth Reader (1915)

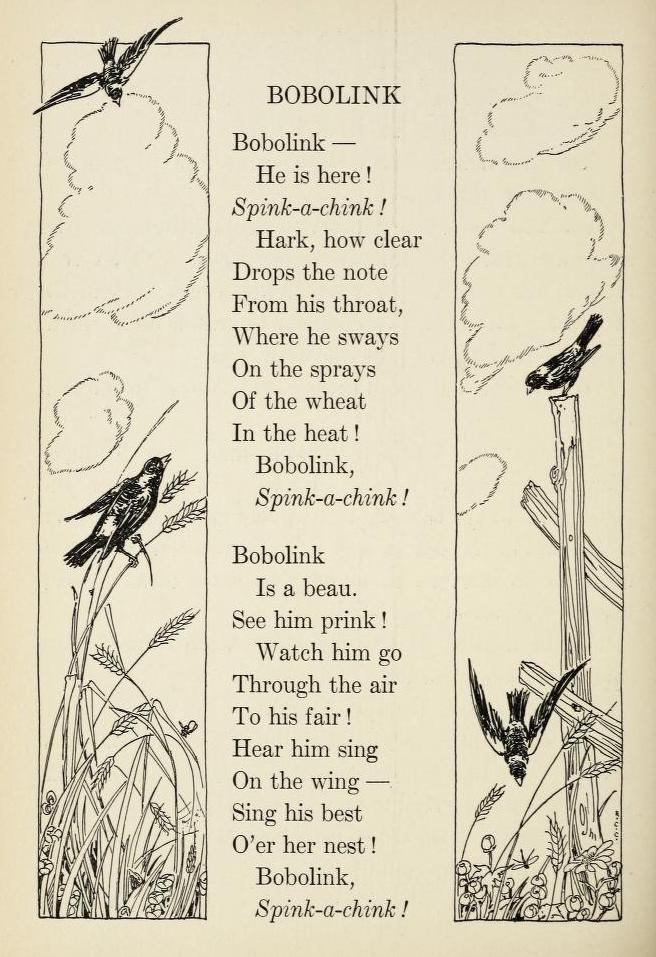
Page layout from The Merrill Readers: Fourth Reader (1915)

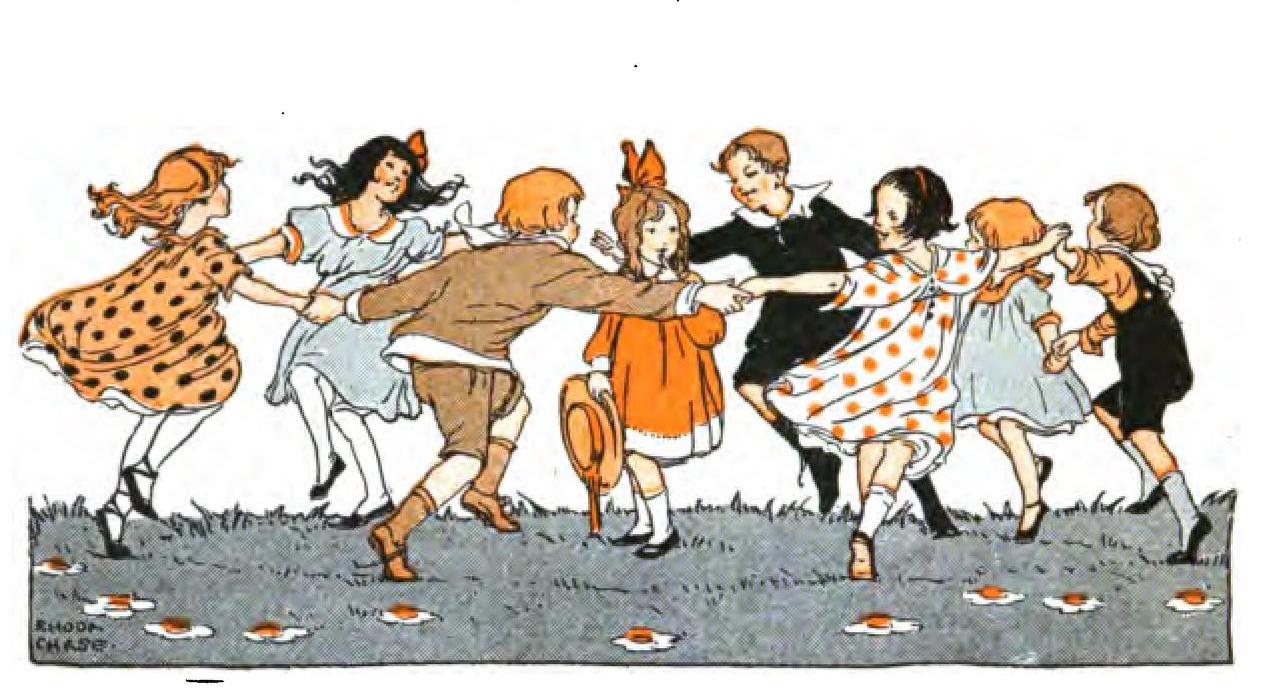
Illustration from The Child's World: First Reader (1917)

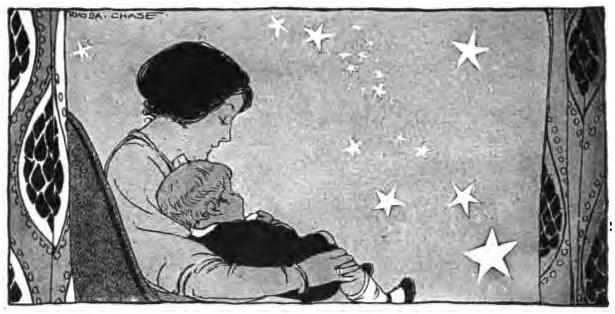
Illustration from The Child's World: First Reader (1917)

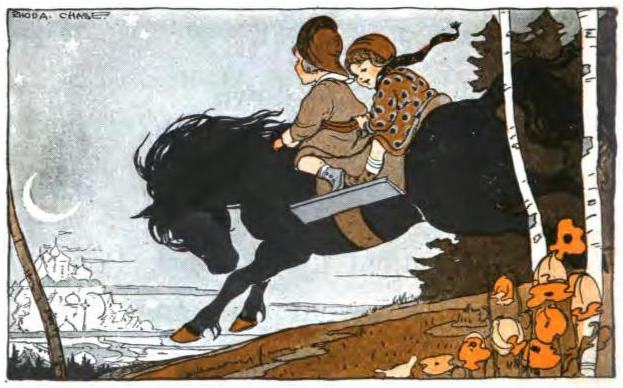
Illustration from The Child's World: First Reader (1917)

== Selected illustrated works ==
- Story Hour Readers Revised Book Two (1914)
- Wonderdays and Wonderways Through Flowerland, by Grace Tabor (c. 1916)
- Told By The Sandman (c. 1916), by Abbie Phillips Walker
- Mother Goose (Mayhew, Ralph and Burges Johnson)
- The Child's World First Reader (1917)
- The Child's World – Second through Fifth Reader (c. 1917), by Hetty S. Brown, Sarah Withers, and W. K. Tate
- Stories for Good Children (c. 1920), by Lora B. Peck
- So-Fat and Mew-Mew (c. 1918), by Georgiana Craik May
- The Christmas Reindeer (1926), by Thornton Waldo Burgess
- ...Far and Near: A Fourth Reader (1928), by Charles Edward Skinner, Mathilde Cecilia Gecks and John William Withers
- Friends to Make: A First Reader (1928), co-illustrated by Mabel Betsy Hill; written by Charles Edward Skinner, Mathilde Cecilia Gecks and John William Withers
- Playfellows: A Primer (1928), by Charles Edward Skinner, Mathilde Cecilia Gecks and John William Withers
- Fact and Story Readers (c. 1931), by Henry Suzzallo, George E. Freeland, Katherine L. McLaughlin, Ada M. Skinner
- For the Children's Hour (1923), by Caroyln S. Bailey and Clara M. Lewis
