= Kevin Chase =

Canadian country music singer-songwriter

- Born: July 20, 1976 (age 49); Saint John, New Brunswick, Canada
- Genres: Country
- Occupation: Singer-songwriter
- Labels: Interscope, Universal, AGR Television Records
- Website: www.kevinchase.ca

Kevin Chase (born July 20, 1976) is a Canadian singer-songwriter.

== Music career ==
Chase has released four albums: Another Road in 2002 and I Won't Fall in 2006, the latter producing 2 minor Top 40 hits "I Won't Fall" and "The Rush" on the Canadian Country Music News Charts. Both albums were nominated for an East Coast Music Award for Country Album of the Year.

Chase's CD Hold On Tight was released by AGR Television Records in July 2010 in Europe and the Middle East, according to a recent press release. The album was originally titled Round 3 and was released in 2010 in the US and Canada thru Interscope/Universal, but the German label thought it would cause confusion in their markets, as the first two CDs had not been released overseas. The 14 track album was recorded in Saint John at Atlantica Studios. Chase, Marc Gosselin and Jim Kuehnel produced 13 of the tracks, while Nashville's Anthony Little was tapped to mix some of the tracks on the CD. Little has previously worked with Reba McEntire, Tina Turner and Justin Timberlake. Little was taken with Chase's voice and material so he offered Chase a couple of songs. Those songs, "Let's Get Dirty" and "You Gotta Love It" brought the song collection to 14 tracks on the new CD. Little also did some production work on "Let's Get Dirty" with the three co-producers.

In May and June 2011 Chase filmed a video for the single "Let's Get Dirty", the first major single release from "Hold On Tight", in Saint John, New Brunswick, Canada.

The success of the album "Hold On Tight" brought Kevin Chase into the Asian market. Chase was the first Western artist to tour mainland China. He played the Oriental Arts Centre in Shanghai; the tour also included stops at performing arts theatres in Shenzhen, Guangzhou, Changsha and Wuhan. Crowds at all venues were very enthusiastic about the music and the artists, lining up by the hundreds to catch a glimpse, autograph or photo for a keep sake. Due to this success the album "Hold On Tight" was released in summer 2013 in China, Taiwan, Hong Kong and Macau through the Shanghai Music Group.

In summer 2013 Kevin Chase returned to the Atlantica Studios in New Brunswick to start recording several new songs for his fourth album, tentatively titled "Get a Groove On". The album featured similar collaborations as on his previous album. It was released in March 2015 by AGR Television Records. with the shortened title "Groove On". The Production team of Kevin Chase, Marc Gosselin and Jim Kuehnel was once again responsible for the sound production of the record and hit writer/producer Anthony Little was also back in the fold. A video was shot for the first single, "Whole Lotta Honey" in Saint John, New Brunswick, Canada, which featured Chase alongside model Katelin Amber Bailey, who also served as the model for the album art work. The video was shot and directed by the CD's co-producer Jim Kuehnel. Two additional videos for the songs "Raise The Roof" and "Long Way to Go" were released in 2015.

== Discography ==
- 2002: Another Road
- 2006: I Won't Fall
- 2010: Round 3 (US and Canada only) (Label: Interscope/Universal)
- 2011: Hold On Tight (Label: AGR Television Records)
- 2015: Groove On (Label: AGR Television Records)

== Videography ==
- 2011: Let's Get Dirty
- 2012: Lonesome Ornery and Mean
- 2014: Whole Lotta Honey
- 2015: Raise The Roof
- 2015: Long Way To Go
