= Jessie Kalmbach Chase =

US fine art painter

- Born: November 22, 1879; Baileys Harbor, Wisconsin, US
- Died: October 1970; Green Bay, Wisconsin, US
- Occupation: painter

Jessie Kalmbach Chase (November 22, 1879 – October 1970) was a fine art painter based in Wisconsin. Much of her work showing Wisconsin landscapes was inspired by the views available in her native Door County.

== Birth and early life ==
Jessie was born on November 22, 1879, in Baileys Harbor, Wisconsin. Her parents were Albert Kalmbach and Dora C. Higgins, who were married in 1878; Jessie had two sisters and a brother. She married Wilfred Chase and lived with him in Madison.

== Career ==
Chase studied design at and graduated from the Art Institute of Chicago before becoming a stained glass window designer for an art glass company in Chicago; in this work she would often prepare water color paintings to demonstrate the design before producing a window. Her later work was in oils. She would spend time studying a scene in person then retreat to a studio to create the paintings saying that she did not want to simply copy nature, but wanted to show specific light situations and to avoid mosquitoes.

In the 1920s she was a member of the Madison Art Guild, exhibiting works in the area. Her work was also distributed through the Madison Art association to galleries statewide, such as for an exhibit at the Sawyer Foundation in Oshkosh in 1926 and at the Milwaukee Journal's Gallery of Wisconsin Art in 1929. In the 1930s, as her body of work grew, Chase had individual exhibitions at museums across the state such as at the Little Gallery in Manitowoc in 1936.

In 1933–34, she was employed by the Works Progress Administration's Public Works of Art Project. Chase created murals for the Madison Public Library and the Bank of Sturgeon Bay. For some of the larger pieces she created in this decade, Chase worked in a mixture of cement and oil paint to create "cement-frescoes" such as were created for the entrance to Madison West High School and some civic structures in Fort Atkinson.

== Death and legacy ==
She died in 1970 in Green Bay. Some of Chase's work was added to the permanent collection at the Miller Art Museum in Sturgeon Bay. Two of her murals were also installed at the Door County Library in 2010.
