= Paul Chase (educator) =

American academic administrator

Paul Chase is the retired Dean of the University of Wisconsin–Barron County located in Rice Lake, Wisconsin.

Chase was a director of the Barron County Restorative Justice Programs, a private non-profit program designed to let victims and offenders work together to solve social problems in Barron County.

In addition to administration, Chase was on the faculty of the history department. Chase speaks German.
