= Jonathan Chase =

Jonathan Chase may refer to:

- Jonathan Chase (actor) (born 1979), American actor
- Jonathan Chase (colonel) (1732–1800), American Revolutionary War soldier
- Jonathan Lyndon Chase (born 1989), American artist

== See also ==
- John Chase (disambiguation)
