= Charles Chase =

Charlie, Charley or Charles Chase may refer to:

- Charles L. Chase (1828—after 1877), American politician from Minnesota
- Charles A. Chase (1864–1937), American tennis champion
- Charley Chase (1893–1940), American comedy actor, screenwriter and film director
- Charles Chase (boxer) (1931–1997), Canadian Olympic light middleweight
- Charlie Chase (broadcaster) (born 1952), American radio and television host (Crook & Chase)
- DJ Charlie Chase (born 1959), American DJ; key supporter of Puerto Rican music and culture
- Charles Chase (comics), the father of Adrian Chase/Vigilante in DC Comics

== See also ==
- Charlie Hall Chase, English horse race established in 1969
