= Arthur Chase =

Arthur Chase may refer to:

- Arthur Adalbert Chase (1873–1951), British cyclist
- Arthur E. Chase (1930–2015), American businessman and politician
