= Edith Chase =

American environmental activist

Edith Chase (25 November 1924 – 13 June 2017) was an American environmental activist and community leader.

== Early life and education ==
Edith Chase was born on 25 November 1924 in Minneapolis, Minnesota. Her parents were Floyd Cates and Aimee née Fisher Cates. Chase attended Antioch College, graduating with a Bachelor of Science in chemistry in 1945. She then earned a Master of Science in chemistry from the University of Minnesota.

== Environmental science and activism ==
Chase moved to in Kent, Ohio in 1958 and ended up residing there for over fifty years, during which she was involved in environmental study and protection. Her interest in environmental activism stemmed from reading the book Silent Spring by Rachel Carson. She was further galvanized when the Cuyahoga River caught fire in June 1969. In 1970, she was a founding member of the Kent Environmental Council. In 1982, she was a founding member of the Ohio Coastal Resource Management Project. She was also one of the first members of the Coastal Resources Advisory Council. She was a contributing author to reports on hydrology published by the United States Geological Survey.

== League of Women Voters ==
Chase served as president of the League of Women Voters of Kent from 1965 to 1967.

== Awards and honors ==
In 1992, Chase was inducted into the Ohio Department of Natural Resources Hall of Fame. A park in Franklin Township, Portage County, Ohio was named Chase Park in honor of Chase and her husband, with the county Trustees describing her as a "respected member of this community and a valuable asset to all of the residents of Franklin Township". In 2014, Chase received the Outstanding Environmental Leader Award from the Burning River Foundation.

== Later life and death ==
In 2014 at age 90, Chase moved to Ithaca, New York to be closer to her daughter. The move was precipitated by her declining health. She died on 13 June 2017 at the age of 92.

== Personal life ==
While working at the pharmaceutical company Merck & Co. in New Jersey, Edith Cates met Richard Chase, whom she married. Together they had two children.
