= John Chase =

John Chase may refer to:

- John Churchill Chase (1905–1986), American editorial cartoonist and historian
- John Chase (artist) (1810–1879), English painter
- John Chase (boxer) (1904–1991), Irish Olympic boxer
- John Chase (ice hockey) (1906–1994), American ice hockey player and Olympic silver medalist
- John Chase (doctor and soldier) (1856–1918), American medical doctor and commander of the Colorado National Guard in Colorado Labor Wars and Ludlow Massacre
- John B. Chase (1872–1960), American politician
- John C. Chase (1870–1939), American trade union activist and politician
- John F. Chase (1843–1914), American Civil War soldier and Medal of Honor recipient
- John Paul Chase (1901–1973), criminal associate of Baby Face Nelson and Homer Van Meter
- John S. Chase (1925–2012), American architect
- Johnny Chase: Secret Agent of Space, radio serial

== See also ==
- Jack Chase (disambiguation)
- Jonathan Chase (disambiguation)
