= Flo Chase =

French-born musician

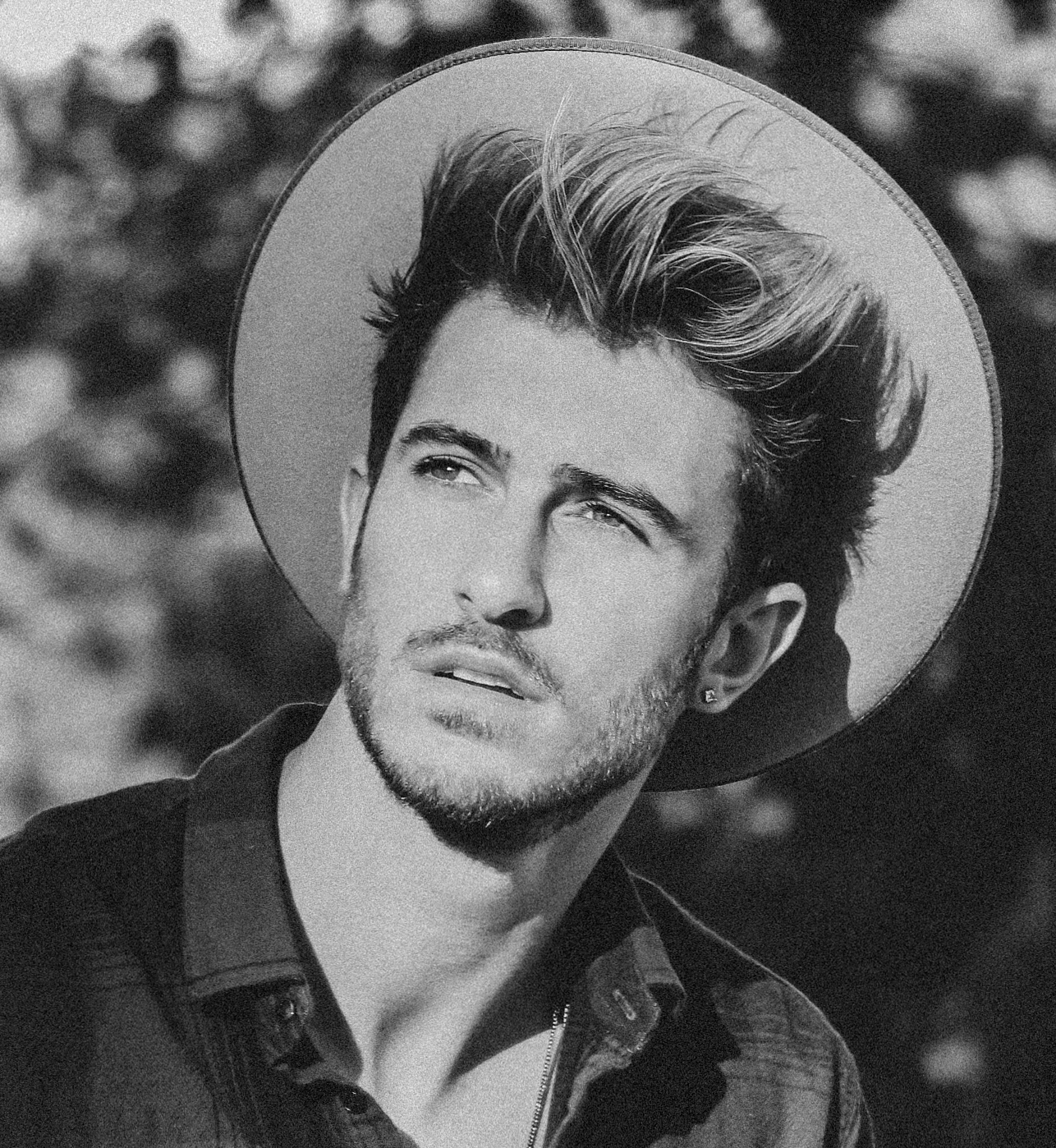

Background information
- Birth name: Flo Tarpinian
- Occupation(s): Singer-Songwriter, Indie Pop, Indie Folk
- Instruments: Vocals, Guitar, Piano, Harmonica, Banjo, Drums

Florian Tarpinian, better known by his stage name Flo Chase, is a French-born singer-songwriter and musician from Australia who currently resides in Los Angeles, California.

== Career ==
On August 8, 2017, Flo Chase released his debut single "Lonely River" from his debut EP Le Debut. The music video for "Lonely River" accumulated over two hundred and fifty thousand views in a few short weeks after its release.

On August 18, 2017, he released his debut EP Le Debut. It was recorded in Sydney Australia and produced by ARIA winning record producer Wayne Connolly.

On August 28, 2018, Chase released "Kiss You Goodbye". The single was co-produced by Wayne Conolly at Hercules Street Studios in Sydney, Australia.

On August 23, 2019, he released "Spinning Wheel". Co-produced by Houston Fry and Grammy award-winning mixing engineer Michael Brauer (Coldplay, John Mayer). On September 19, 2019, he released a second single called "Lost in her Beauty".

On January 23, 2021, Chase released "More of You" the first single from his debut full-length album titled Toi. On February 11, 2021, he released the second single from Toi titled "Everywhere with me".

On February 26, 2021, he released "Lies", the third single from Toi. Directed by Jacob Luevano, the official music video for “Lies” was filmed between Laguna Beach and Los Angeles Arts District and features several guest dancers, including Artyon and Arthur Celestine and Japanese dance duo Hilty and Bosch.

On March 12, 2021, Chase released Toi. He co-produced the entire record with Houston Fry at Barking Owl Sound in Los Angeles, California. His older brother Theo assisted with production and offered creative feedback on each track. Toi was mixed by Kolton Lee (Kaleo, Foy Vance, Shania Twain, Niall Horan) and was mastered by Grammy Award winner Joe LaPorta (Shawn Mendes, David Bowie, Foo Fighters, The Weeknd).

On March 28, 2021, Chase released "Never Came Back (The Remix)" featuring LA rapper Jodie Jo. The re-imagined version of his track "Never Came Back” explores the idea of moving on after giving all to someone who is unable to return the dedication.

== Discography ==
Studio albums
| Title | Details |
|---|---|
| Toi | Released: 12 March 2021 |

Singles and Extended Plays
| Year | Tile | Album |
|---|---|---|
| 2021 | "Never Came Back (The Remix) feat. Jodie Jo"" | Toi |
| 2021 | "Lies" | Toi |
| 2021 | "Everywhere With Me" | Toi |
| 2021 | "More of You" | Toi |
| 2019 | "Lost in her beauty" | Toi |
| 2019 | "Spinning Wheel" | Toi |
| 2018 | "Kiss You Goodbye" | Non-album single |
| 2017 | "Le Debut EP" | Le Debut |
| 2017 | "Lonely River" | Le Debut |
