= Sarah Chase =

American birth control activist

Sarah Blakesley Chase (also spelled Sara Blakelee; 18 Jan 1837–10 Jul 1914) was known for her battle with Anthony Comstock over the selling of contraceptive devices across state borders.

== Biography ==
Sarah Ann Blakeslee was born on 18 January 1837, in Clermont County, Ohio, to the Presbyterian clergyman James Blakeslee, who spent some time working as a missionary among people of color and Jamaican roots. She was raised in Broome County, New York, and discovered at the age of twelve a passion to become a religious speaker. The purpose of her career choice was derived from her hopes of gaining classical and medical knowledge to pursue a job within the medical field. Sarah wanted to aid those who suffered mentally and physically. She was characterized as a woman of courage and strength, which was something that she displayed early on, by starting from the bottom and guiding herself up to the top, earning a doctorate in medicine. Sarah had faced numerous conflicts within her life, as well as her career, that ultimately resulted from her gender and social class during the time period. She was a woman who wanted other women to have a choice in their lives, starting with their own bodies. She left the decision to prevent pregnancy up to other women, which caused this conflicting argument of whether or not her theory behind birth control was valid and if it disobeyed the church's opinion.

== Early life ==
Sarah Blakeslee was raised by her father, James Blakeslee, and mother, Rachel. She had five brothers. She grew up in what many would describe as poverty, and her father had very little means to pay for her education. Women who wanted to seek employment often struggled due to men's being prejudiced, which decreased their chances. Luckily for Sarah, she began working as a teacher's assistant at the age of sixteen while still attending school. She graduated from Alfred University in Allegheny County, New York, at the age of twenty-one, and decided to put herself through medical school.

== Married life ==
Sarah Ann Blakeslee married Hazard D. Chase in Cleveland in 1875. Hazard was an alumnus of Michigan University. He decided to enlist in the Army and returned to his wife four years later. Sarah Chase had one daughter from this marriage, Grace L. The couple was divorced in December 1878.

On December 4, 1888, Sarah married Thomas Hookey of Denver, Colorado.

At exactly 9:15 pm, Mrs. Chase entered the parlor from the vestibule door on the arm of Judge Hookey, and the couple took their stand between the palms. There were no introductory remarks, but the judge immediately took Mrs. Chase's right hand and, with a voice broken with emotion, said: I take thee, Sarah B. Chase, as my lawful, wedded wife, proving to you in the presences of these witnesses to be a loving husband in sickness and in health until death do us part.

Mrs. Chase then said her vow. Then they signed a marriage contract, and their guests signed it as witnesses. This marriage lasted eight months. At her manslaughter trial in 1893, Sarah stated that she did not know what had become of Mr. Hookey.

== Midlife ==
In 1868, Chase decided to go an alternate route. She then attended Cleveland Hospital College. Her new ambitions were to maintain a career in teaching, but with a focus on physiology and sexology in order to teach it at local churches to men and women. Some believe that it was her new focus that led her to begin selling and exporting birth control. Chase first begun distributing contraceptives in 1873 and did so for four years until her first arrest. In May 1878, Chase was arrested by Anthony Comstock, chief agent in the New York Society for the Suppression of Vice, for violating a federal law that banned the dissemination and distribution of contraceptives through the mail or across state lines. Chase had been set up by individuals who worked with Comstock and had been arrested on the scene of the crime. Some believe that Comstock had previous knowledge of Chase’s black market birth control but lacked the evidence he needed in order to convict her.

Chase was released on a fifteen-hundred-dollar bail, and when finally brought to trial, a jury that consisted solely of men dismissed the case due to an insufficient amount of evidence. After discovering that there would be no trial, Comstock became outraged and demanded action. He designed two bills of indictment that could be used against Chase, but they required a signature; neither the prosecutors nor the judge wanted to take part. After discovering that Chase had been falsely arrested, she filed a $10,000 civil lawsuit against Comstock but made no progress with it.

Documents indicate that between the years of 1878 and 1900, Chase was arrested five times, but this did not affect her practice or mentality regarding the prevention of conception. One of the justifications for her arrest was on the basis of the death of Maggie Manzon on February 12, 1893. However, that was caused by an abortion, not from the actual birth control, which resulted in Chase serving jail time (convicted of manslaughter in the first degree, June 1893) and sentenced to 9 years and 8 months in state prison.

On June 4, 1900, she was arrested again by Comstock for distributing articles that provided details on the prevention of pregnancy. When brought before a jury, the charges were dropped again. Birth control to some was looked upon as a crime, while others had a different mindset about maintaining a sense of control regarding the number of babies that entered the world.

Though we only know very little about Sarah B. Chase, she was one of the first women leaders in the black market for birth control, and her success enabled others to take a stand. For instance, Margaret Sanger fought against legal impediments to reproductive rights in the 1920s. With a shift in society, Comstock decided to take the next step in seeking to have certain laws passed. One particular law, which banned the distribution of any type of document that promoted the prevention of conception, was a law that Comstock had lacked in previous years as a basis for arrest regarding Sarah Chase.

== Divorce ==
Historians believe that Sarah’s willpower to succeed led to a drastic decline in her marriage. On December 15, 1878, her husband, Dr. Hazard D. Chase, decided to sue for divorce on the grounds of abandonment. The case was taken to court, where Mr. Chase presented evidence indicating that his wife’s career had taken a toll on their marriage. The defense argued that because of Mrs. Chase’s determination and aspiration, it led her to become a successful physician. As a result of her accomplishment, it caused tension between her and Mr. Chase due to his constant comparison to the ideal wife to Sarah. It has created a disconnect, especially on her part, which eventually led her to decide that the best option was for her and her daughter, Grace L. Chase, to be removed from the situation. Throughout the trial, both parties discussed the marriage and their feelings for one another; the divorce was finalized on December 30, 1878.

It is unclear if she divorced her second husband, Thomas Hookey, or simply ended what had been an unconventional union. After eight months of marriage, she ordered Mr. Hookey to leave and gave him a payment of $5,000 cash. Mr. Hookey pressed for alimony, which Dr. Chase refused. Dr, Chase stated that Mr. Hookey had lied about being wealthy and was, in fact, after her wealth.

However, when she died on 10 Jul 1914, she was recorded as Sarah B. Hookey, a widow.
