= Rick Chase =

American disc jockey (1957–2002)

- Born: George T. Fryer; 1957
- Origin: Salinas, California, United States
- Occupation: Disc jockey

Rick Chase (born George T. Fryer; June 12, 1957 in Salinas, California – December 12, 2002 in Stockton), was a disc jockey known primarily for his thirteen years as a DJ on San Francisco radio station KMEL 106.1 FM.

== Career ==
Chase was a disk jockey and program host with San Francisco-based KMEL from 1986 to 1999. Prior to that, he was heard on KITS from 1983 to 1985, coming to the station as one of the original Hot Hits air personalities. He worked the overnight shift, as Flip Fryer, and eventually worked his way up to the afternoon drive time shift. He was known for sketches such as Dinner Across America and Vaughn Richards as well as for promoting listener interaction and identifying future talent.

== Controversies ==
In May 1991, Chase, KMEL, and KMEL's parent company, Century Broadcasting, were sued over a charge of assault and battery stemming from a "legs contest" held at "Jam Zone" the previous June in Daly City. The plaintiff in the suit alleged she had been physically pushed by Chase from a stage where she was performing. KMEL program director Keith Naftaly countered that the plaintiff, Sharon Ferguson, was beginning a striptease, a violation of the rules.

In January 1993, the Federal Communications Commission upheld a $25,000 fine levied against Century Broadcasting for material presented on Chase's "The Rick Chase Show." Broadcast between August 20 and September 16, 1991, the segment of Chase's show was called "Dinner Across America" and had Chase calling people to ask them "what was the last thing you had in your mouth?" Chase replied to the fine, saying "It seems the right of free speech doesn't apply to radio." "I only considered it entertainment," he said.

Chase emceed a July 13, 1999 "motivational assembly" at Washington High School in San Francisco. The event was sponsored by Mario Murillo, a Danville Christian preacher, and featured a religious message. The religious nature of the event was in violation of the U.S. Supreme Court's interpretation of the First Amendment to the United States Constitution, and as such the school superintendent said the group would not be permitted to return.

== Death ==
On December 12, 2002, Chase was found dead of a heart attack in his Stockton home. Two memorial services were held, one was held in Modesto California, Friday December 20, 2002 6 PM at Victory Life Center Foursquare Church. Rick (George) had been doing a morning show on KWIN/KWNN 97.7 & 98.3 FM where he also consulted on “A Dose of the Ghost” hosted by Pastor Greg Young, Holy Hip Hop with a message, on Sunday mornings. Rick’s family ask Pastor Greg to host a memorial which he did with the permission of Senior Pastor Jerry Quillen, for Rick’s long time Bay Area friends and Central Valley audience. Brian Huen his longtime producer on KMEL produced a memorial video which was played. The second memorial was in his hometown, Salinas, on December 21 at St. George's Episcopal Church.
