= George S. Chase =

American composer (1909–1972)

George Salisbury Chase
- Born: October 23, 1909; Brooklyn, New York, U.S.
- Died: August 1, 1972 (aged 62)
- Other names: Michael Reynolds, Franz Mahl
- Occupations: Composer for film and library music

George Salisbury Chase (1909–1972) was an American composer for film and library music. He was born in Brooklyn, New York, on October 23, 1909, to George S. and Florence E. (Reynolds) Chase. He is primarily known by his pseudonym “Michael Reynolds”.

In 1957, Chase was hired by R.T.F. Music Publishing Corp., a subsidiary of Thomas J. Valentino, Inc., to write background and production film music, and remained working there until his death. Chase composed under the pseudonym of Michael Reynolds for the firm's Major Record library. He was also known under the pseudonym "Franz Mahl".

Some of his compositions were used in episodes of the 1955–1956 seasons of Adventures of Superman. Four of them, "Dark of the Moon," "Mystic Night," "Hypertension," and "Vigil," were also tracked into Edward D. Wood Jr.'s "Plan 9 from Outer Space" (1956). He is also credited with composing the music for the 1952–4 television show Mr. and Mrs. North. Chase was a composer of liturgical music as well; the 1940 U.S. Census records his occupation as "musician, church."

He was an active member of Brooklyn Council of the Knights of Columbus.

Chase died on August 1, 1972, in Huntingdon, New York.

== Sixty Second Commercial ==
Chase is notably known in the 21st century, especially in the 2020s, for his library composition Sixty Second Commercial #1. The song is widely known as a piece that uses similar tones to the ones used in the television commercials during the technological era in the 1950s. The composition has been used as background audio track for short format videos on platforms like YouTube Shorts.

The piece itself is from a collection of other library and film songs, going under the name Untitled composed by Chase and a different composer Bernard Westman.

The piece is from a vinyl, which itself is labelled as "TJV 84", defining the 84th vinyl record of Thomas J. Valentino, Inc. It was released in 1966, and contains 8 songs on first side (A side) and 9 on the other (B side), where Sixty Second Commercial #1 is found in side B. .
