= Rhoda Chase =

American blues singer

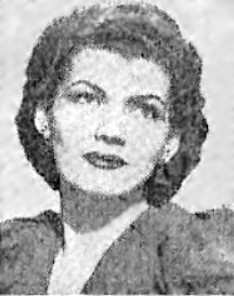
Rhoda Chase in a 1942 advertisement

Rhoda Chase, née Anna Blanor (June 21, 1914 in Uniontown, Pennsylvania – October 14, 1978 in Mexico City) was “The Blue Velvet Voice”, a radio, stage, nightclub and USO blues singer.

== Background and childhood ==
Rhoda Chase was born of well-to-do Russian parents, Andrew Blanor and Maria Vanchek. Anna, and her four brothers and sisters, lost their parents to the 1918 flu pandemic when Anna was four. Blanor later explained that greedy relatives chose to deprive them of their inheritance as well as protection causing her and her siblings to be raised by different foster parents within the Russian community. She also explained that in spite of a kind foster father, who was a coal miner, her alcoholic foster mother beat her and forbade her to go to school, except when forced by the truant officer. Scars on her knees bore testimony to her claim that she was punished by being forced to kneel on hot coals. At the age of eleven, Anna recalls returning from a field trip with her fourth grade classmates and feeling the blood stream down her face from a cut caused by a broken bottle her drunken foster mother had thrown at her in anger. This event resulted in her running away from home, hiding out with her 15-year-old brother, Barry, also a runaway, who protected her until he was caught and thrown into reform school. Frightened, alone, and unable to speak English fluently, Blanor found work as a maid in the home of a wealthy family. She did odd jobs in sales and modeling her hands and face and began her singing career. By this time, her Russian was reduced to “От имени отца, сына, святого духа, аминь” ("In the name of the Father, the Son, the Holy Ghost, Amen."), her Russian prayer book being the only reminder of her childhood.

== Career ==
Anna got her first break when she auditioned as a contestant on the Major Bowes Amateur Hour, radio's then best-known talent show, one of the most popular programs broadcast in the U.S. in the 1930s and 1940s. The show required her Russian birth certificate in English, and, Anna recalls that, as luck would have it, the Roman Orthodox priest that translated the document took her word for its contents and added the years she needed to qualify for the show. Bowes promoted her as a penniless orphan and used her new stage name, Rhoda, selected by a psychic. Later, her last name was inspired by the Chase and Sanborn coffee commercial.

At the height of the Depression, this show made the Bowes wealthy. People came to New York City from all over the country; they sold their homes, hitched rides, traveled in box cars, thousands of people applied every week to be on the show, hoping to tap dance, sing or harmonica their way to fame and fortune. Bowes sent the more talented contestants on "Major Bowes" vaudeville tours, often with several units roaming the country simultaneously. Rhoda was amongst these chosen struggling acts who got their start with the Bowes like Frank Sinatra, opera stars Lily Pons, Maria Callas, Robert Merrill, and Beverly Sills; comedians Jack Carter, Robert Klein, Jim Stafford and Bob Hope; pop singers Teresa Brewer, Pat Boone, Gladys Knight, Connie Francis, Joey Dee and The Starlighters, and actors Ann-Margret and Raúl Juliá. During one of her early tours, Edgar Hoover encouraged the tour.

Based in Manhattan, Chase traveled, performing to Sammy Kahn’s music arrangements at the Statler chain of hotels throughout the country, and in popular nightclubs like The Hurricane, Beachcomber, The Boulevard and The Conga in New York, Miami Beach Kennel Club, and Paumbo's in Philadelphia. Her popularity on WJZ radio in New York's Broadway Showtime and J. C. Lippen's Battle of the Sexes complemented NBC's Major Bowes Family Hour on WABC. One of the most popular singers on the USO circuit, Rhoda received a Short Snorter bill signed by 300 boys in the South Pacific Fleet unanimously electing her “Girl they’d like waiting for them at the dock when they got home” during two consecutive years. Panama and Puerto Rico were also graced by her visit to different clubs like the Casanova and the Zombie. Mexico’s L’Intime and El Patio clubs put her in the company of famous Mexican comedians ‘Cantinflas’ and ‘Tin Tan.’

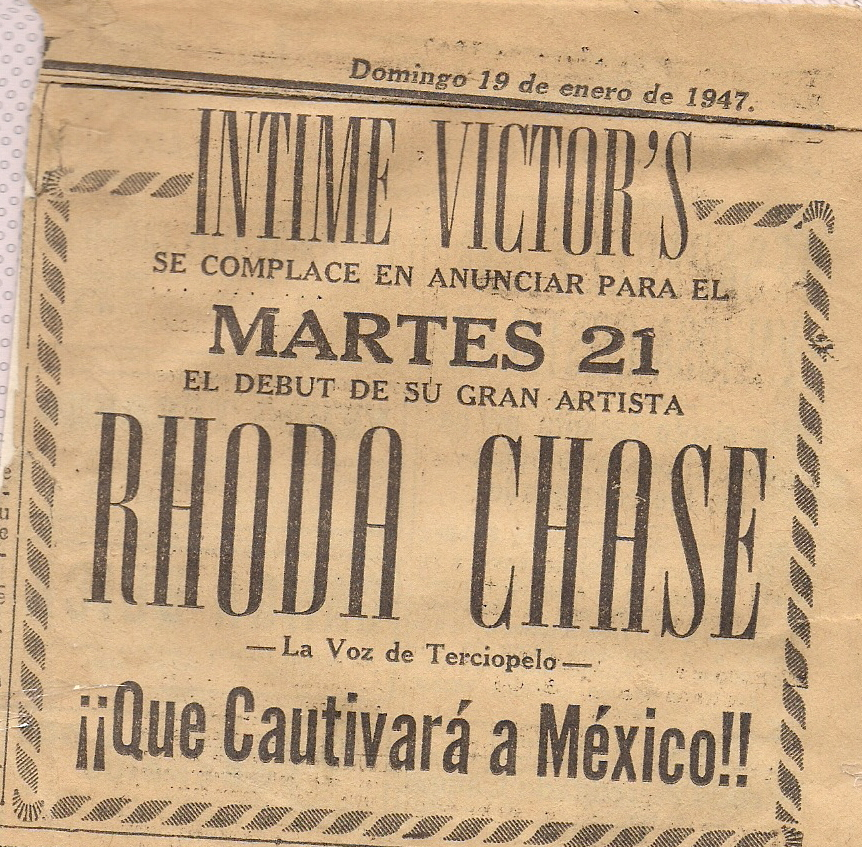
Rhoda Chase at L'Intime Mexico City

== Marriage and retirement ==
On January 5, 1947 Chase was greeted and wooed by L’Intime nightclub manager Alfonso De la Barrera, whom she married, quitting show business to raise their three children in Mexico City. Rhoda is quoted as saying "All I ever wanted was a family."

Chase died of emphysema in Mexico City on October 14, 1978. She was survived by her husband, Alfonso, her three daughters, Elizabeth, Joanne and Dolores and five grandchildren.
