= W. Howard Chase =

W. Howard Chase (1910 – September 8, 2003) was the founding member of the Public Relations Society of America, was recognized as No. 9 in the top 10 most influential PR professionals of all time according to a University of Michigan Study in 1970. Born 1910, Chase was noted for being "extremely effective in directing attention to chancing trends". Chase wrote Issue Management: Origins of the Future in 1983. Chase was the director of public relations at General Foods, and then moved to Minneapolis and worked at General Mills from 1941 to 1945. He helped to start the Public Relations Society of America in 1947.
