= George Francis Chase =

United States Army general

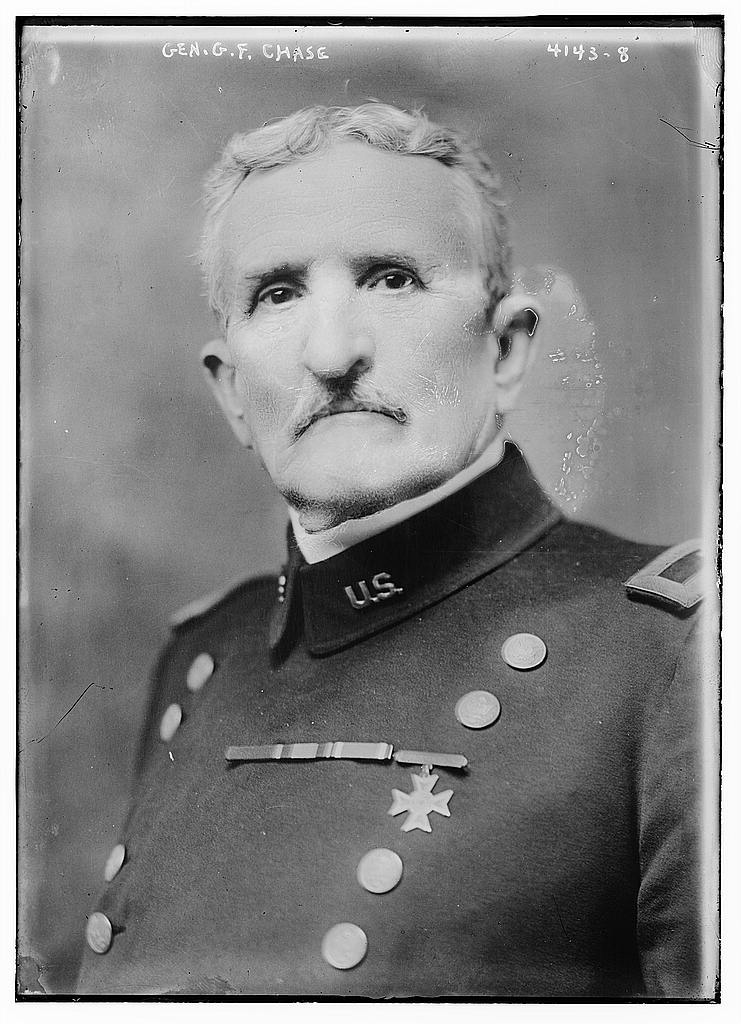
George Francis Chase circa 1912

Brigadier General George Francis Chase (July 29, 1848 – December 13, 1925) was the commander of the 15th Cavalry Regiment and in 1907 he became the United States Army Inspector General for the Department of the East.

== Biography ==
He was born on July 29, 1848, in Macomb, Illinois, to James Morris Chase and Salina Venable. He attended the United States Military Academy from July 1, 1867, to June 12, 1871.

He commanded 15th Cavalry Regiment in Cuba from October 1906 to May 1907.

He retired from military service on July 27, 1912. He died on December 13, 1925, in Washington, D.C. He was buried at the United States Military Academy Post Cemetery.
