= Harry Chase (artist) =

American painter

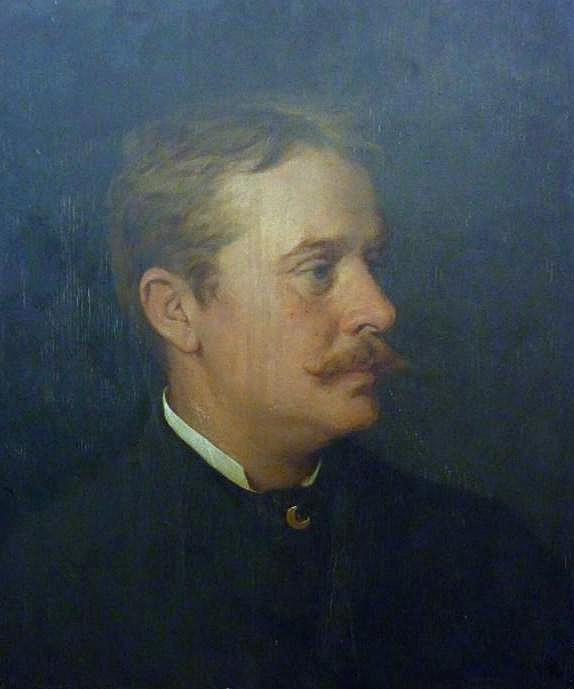
- 1883 Portrait of Harry Chase by Benoni Irwin
- Born: February 2, 1853; Woodstock, Vermont, U.S.
- Died: October 1, 1889 (aged 36); Sewanee, Tennessee, U.S.
- Awards: First Hallgarten Prize (1885)
- Website: www.harrychase.org

Henry Seymour Chase Jr. (February 2, 1853 in Woodstock, Vermont – October 1, 1889 in Sewanee, Tennessee), better known by his professional name Harry Chase, was an American artist who specialized in marine paintings.

== Birth and early life ==
Harry Chase was born on February 2, 1853, to Dr. Henry Seymour Chase and Sarah Denison Chase (née Haskell) in Woodstock, Vermont. In 1857, the family moved to Independence, Iowa, where Dr. Chase tried his hand at farming. Harry grew up in Iowa, and showed an early interest in art. From 1865 to 1868, the Chase family lived in Iowa City, Iowa, where Harry received his first comprehensive art instruction and also matriculated to the State University of Iowa in the city.

In 1868, the Chases moved to St. Louis, Missouri, where Dr. Chase took a position as the Chair of Operative Surgery at the Missouri Dental College.

== Formal studies and early career ==
In 1868, Harry Chase joined the atelier of displaced Southern aristocrat and itinerant portrait painter, James Reeve Stuart, who kept his studio on Olive Street in St. Louis. Together with another young artist, Paul E. Harney Jr., Chase studied under Stuart until 1870, when he departed for New York where Chase entered the Antique Class under Lemuel Wilmarth at the National Academy of Design.

Returning to St. Louis in 1871, Chase was determined to further his studies at the Bavarian Royal Academy of Fine Arts in Munich. In the summer of 1872, Chase departed St. Louis for Munich with another young hopeful, William Merritt Chase (no known relation), and they traveled together to Europe. Harry Chase studied in Munich from 1872 until the end of 1875.

Chase returned to St. Louis in 1876, where he staged a very successful solo show and auction, selling 40 works and pocketing enough from the profits to return to Europe to study in Paris.

Before he left, he married Laura Emeline Eames in January 1877. She was known to family and friends as Emma. Together, Chase and his bride left St. Louis for Paris, where he would study under Paul Constant Soyer. During his time in Paris under Soyer, Chase had a painting accepted to the Salon de Paris in 1878, establishing a reputation for himself as an up-and-coming artist in the broader United States.

In 1879, Chase changed masters and became the protégé of Hendrik Willem Mesdag, the great Dutch marine painter, in Scheveningen, the Netherlands. It was Mesdag and Dutch Impressionism that would have the greatest influence on Chase's style. Under Mesdag, Chase was again successful in having a painting accepted at the Salon de Paris of 1879.

At the end of 1879, Chase returned to St. Louis and held another even more successful solo show and auction, selling a total of 64 works.

== Manhattan ==
In the 1880s, Chase established himself as one of the most notable artists in the United States, opening a studio in Manhattan, and exhibiting at the most important exhibitions around the country. During the summers, he could often be found sailing in New Bedford, Massachusetts, on his yacht Bonnie, using her as a mobile studio. In 1883, he was elected an Associate of the National Academy of Design. In 1885, he won the Hallgarten Prize for his painting New York Harbor, North River, now part of the collection of the Katzen Arts Center of the American University, Washington D.C.

Harry Chase was elected a member of the following artists' societies and clubs during his career:

- A.N.A., National Academy of Design
- Board of Control, American Art Union
- Member, American Water Color Society
- Vice President, Salmagundi Sketch Club
- Member, Artists' Fund Society
- Member, Boston Art Club
- Member, St. Louis Sketch Club
- Academician, St. Louis Academy of Fine Arts

== Exhibitions ==
- 1869-1888 - St. Louis Fair & Expo
- 1874 & 1875 - Kunstverein, Munich, Germany
- 1875-1885 - Brooklyn Art Association
- 1878 & 1879 - Salon de Paris
- 1878, 1880-1889 - National Academy of Design, Annual Exhibitions. He was awarded the 1885 First Hallgarten Prize for New York Harbor—North River.
- 1880s - Salmagundi Sketch Club, American Water Color Society, Philadelphia Academy of the Fine Arts, Philadelphia Society of Artists, Boston Art Club, Southern Exposition, Chicago Interstate Industrial, New England Manufacturers and Mechanics Institute.
- 1883 - International Art Exhibition, Munich, Germany

== Illness and death ==
At the end of 1885, Chase became insane and his career came to an abrupt end. From 1886 to 1889, Chase was treated for his ailments in both Poughkeepsie, New York, at the Hudson River State Asylum for the Insane, and later in Sewanee, Tennessee, under the treatment of Dr. William M. Harlow. Chase died in Sewanee on October 1, 1889, and was brought back to St. Louis where he was buried in Bellefontaine Cemetery.

== Gallery ==
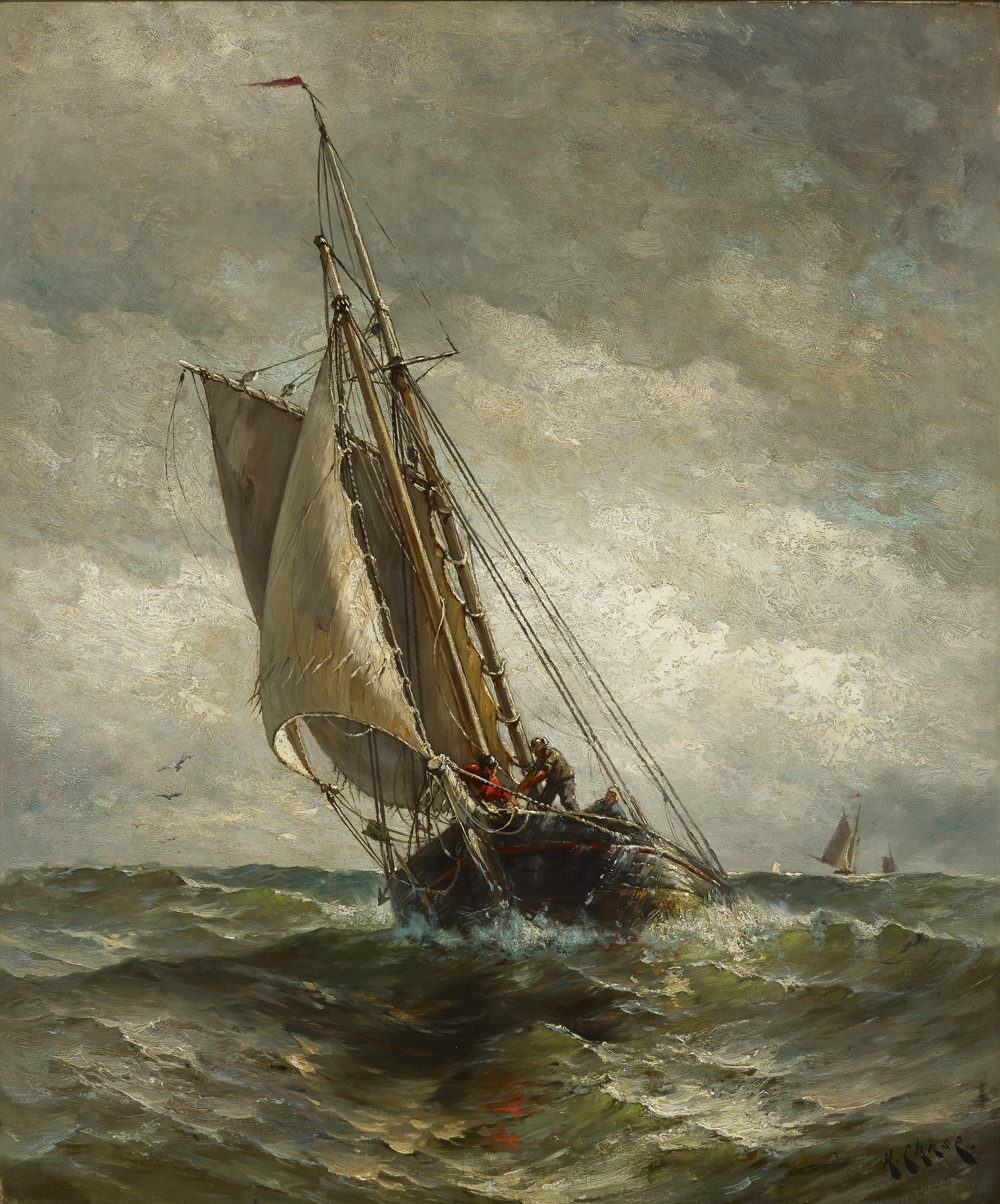
Running for an Anchorage, Oil on Canvas, 1883, Indianapolis Museum of Art

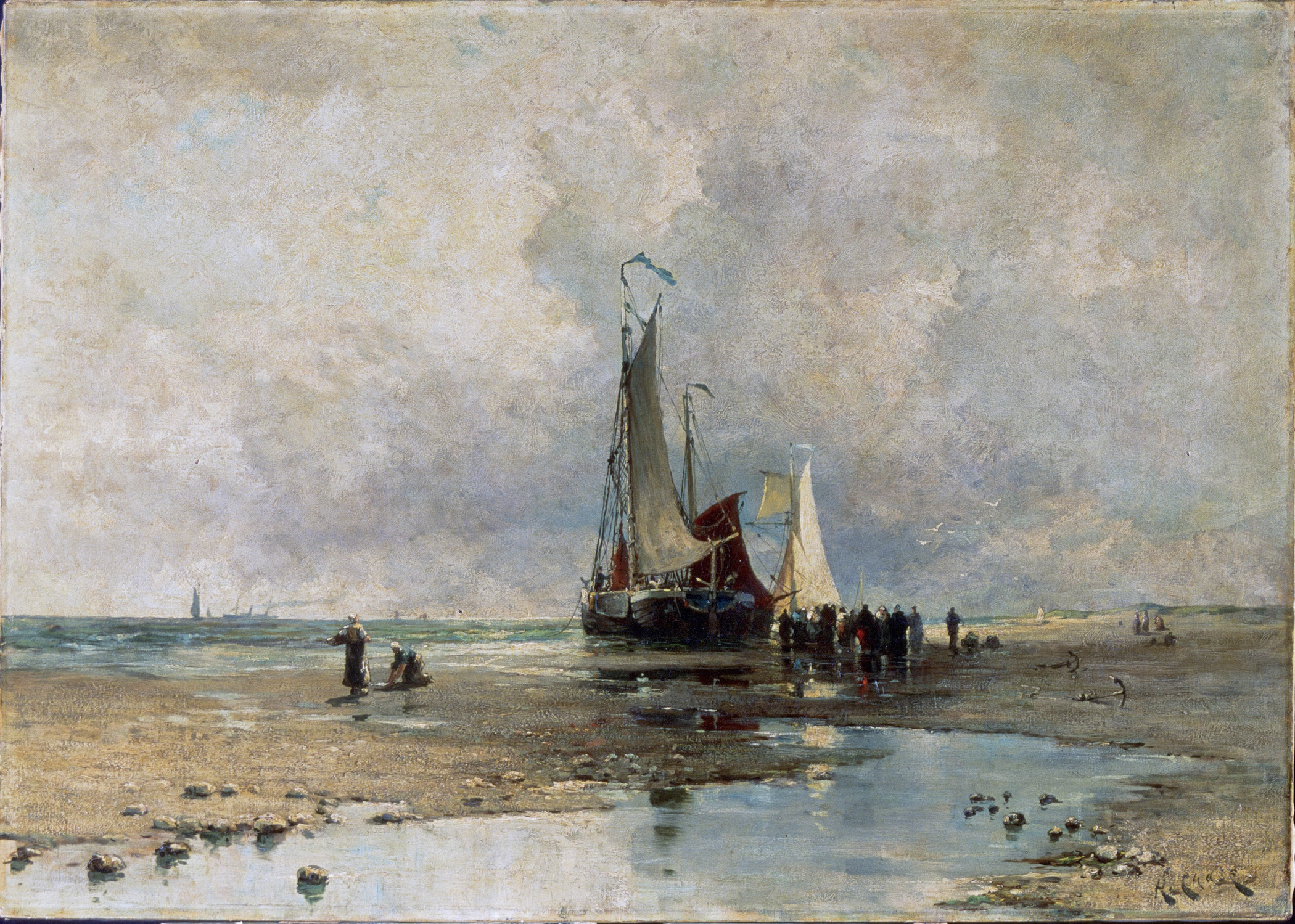
On the Sands, Oil on Canvas, 1883, Hood Museum of Art

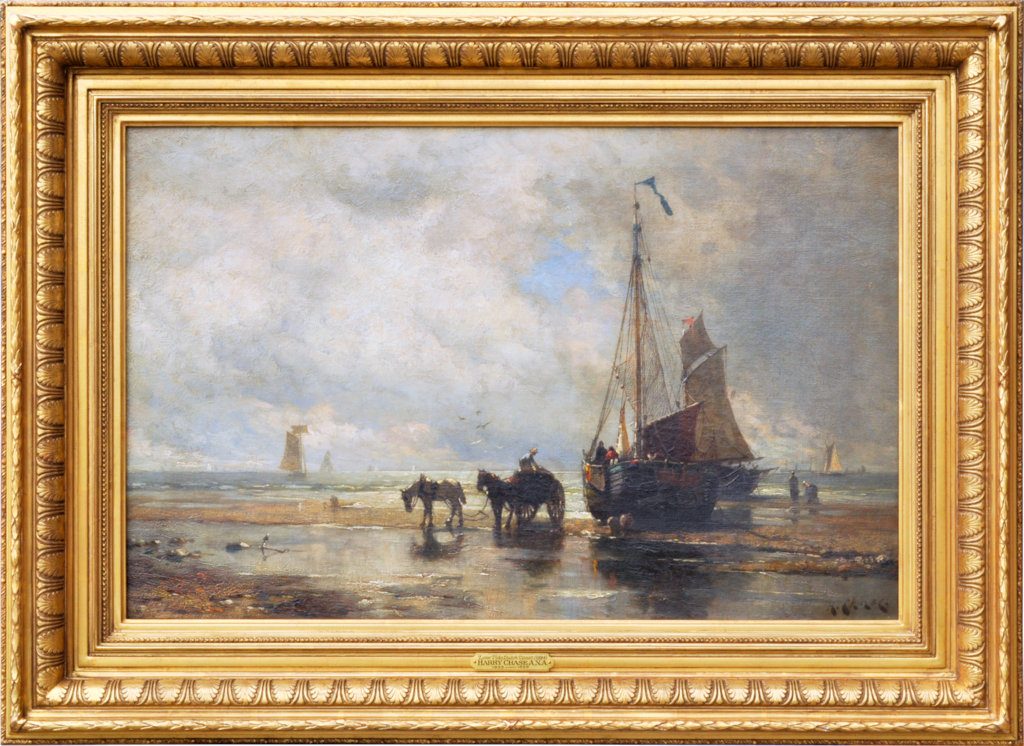
Low Tide, Dutch Coast, Oil on Canvas, 1884, Private Collection

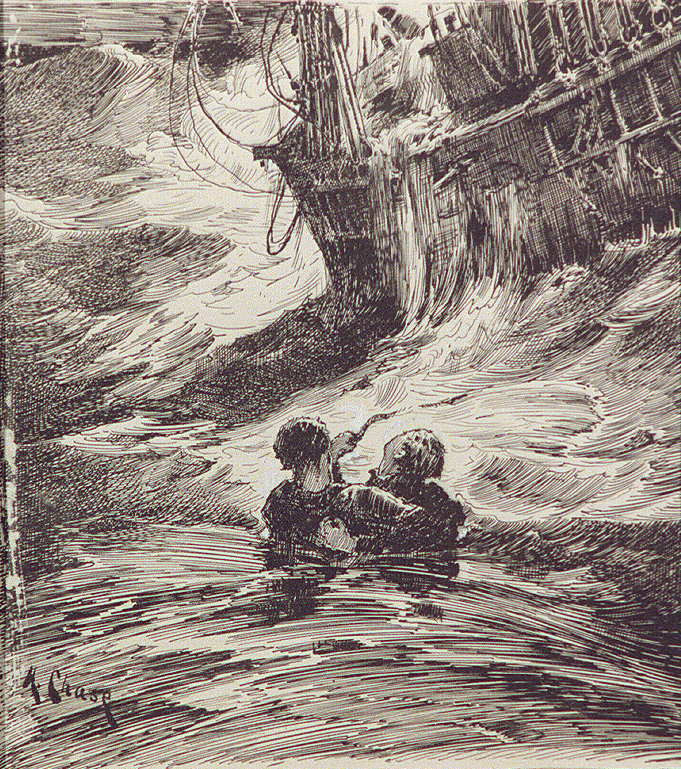
Pen & Ink Drawing for Harper's Young People, 1883,

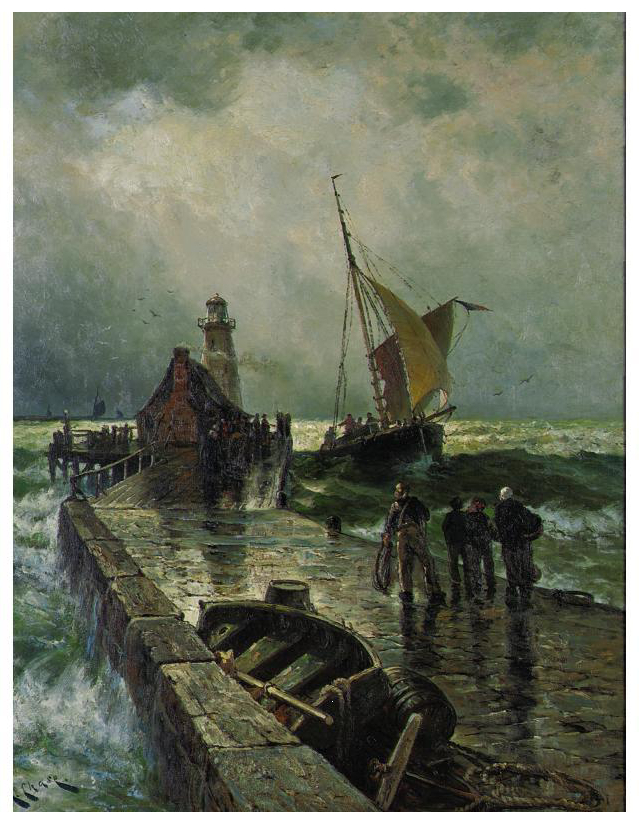
The Return to Port, Oil on Canvas, 1882, from the collection of Laurence Rockefeller
