= Harold W. Chase =

United States Marine Corps general and academic

- Major General Harold W. Chase
- Born: February 6, 1922; Worcester, Massachusetts, U.S.
- Died: January 12, 1982 (aged 59); San Diego, California, U.S.

Academic background
- Education: Princeton University

Academic work
- Discipline: Political science
- Sub-discipline: American constitutional law Public law
- Institutions: University of Minnesota; Princeton University; University of Delaware

Deputy Assistant Secretary of Defense for Reserve Affairs
- In office November 2, 1977 – December 1980
- President: Jimmy Carter

Personal details
- Resting place: Arlington National Cemetery (Section 6, Site 8751-3)
- Awards: Legion of Merit with Combat "V"; Armed Forces Honor Medal 1st Class; Gallantry Cross with Palm; Psychological Warfare Medal

Military service
- Allegiance: United States of America
- Branch/service: United States Marine Corps Reserve
- Years of service: 1943–1977
- Rank: Major General
- Battles/wars: Battle of Iwo Jima

Harold William Chase (February 6, 1922 – January 12, 1982) was an American professor of political science. He was also a major general in the United States Marine Corps Reserve who served as Deputy Assistant Secretary of Defense for Reserve Affairs in the administration of President Jimmy Carter.

Born in Worcester, Massachusetts, and educated at Princeton University, Chase held brief academic appointments at the University of Delaware and Princeton. In 1957, he joined the faculty of the University of Minnesota. He remained a professor there until his death, though he held a number of visiting positions at other institutions. His specialties were American constitutional law and public law.

Chase enlisted in the United States Marine Corps during World War II and was wounded twice in the Battle of Iwo Jima. After the war, he remained in the Marine Corps Reserve, holding a number of notable appointments and rising through the ranks eventually to the rank of major general. He saw active service in the Korean War and the Vietnam War. As Deputy Assistant Secretary of Defense from 1977 to 1980, he had responsibility for all reserve forces, including the National Guard, and advocated for making the job more attractive to potential recruits as a way to strengthen the reserves, rather than a draft.

== Early life and education ==
Harold William Chase was born February 6, 1922, in Worcester, Massachusetts. His parents were Louis Chase and Bessie (Lubin) Chase. He had a sister, Lydia, and three brothers, Gordon, Herbert, and Arnold.

Chase graduated from Phillips Andover Academy in 1939. He entered Princeton University as a member of the undergraduate Class of 1943 but earned his bachelor's degree in 1944, with a major in political science. He went on to earn a master's degree and a Ph.D. in 1948 and 1952, respectively, both also from Princeton.

Chase wed Bernice Hughes Fadden on July 3, 1944, in San Diego, California, while Chase was serving in the Marines. They remained married until his death. They had two sons, Bryce and Eric Chase. Eric graduated from Princeton in 1968; Harold Chase swore him in as a Marine officer the day before Eric graduated.

== Academic career ==
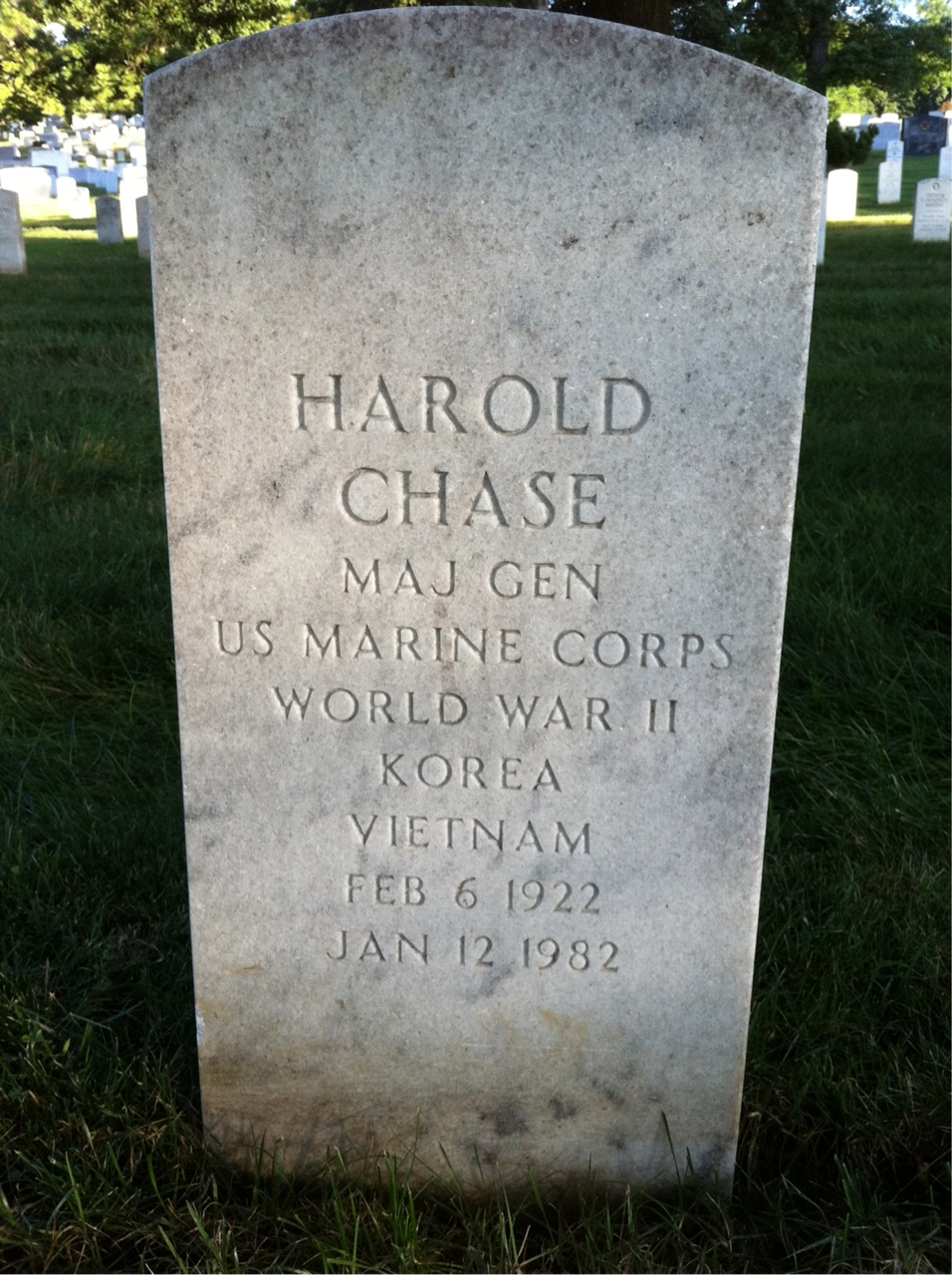
Grave at Arlington National Cemetery

After earning his Ph.D. in 1948, Chase joined the faculty of the University of Delaware as an instructor and assistant professor of political science, serving there until 1950. In 1952, he returned to Princeton as a lecturer and assistant professor of political science. He remained at Princeton until 1957, when he moved to the University of Minnesota as an associate professor of political science. He was promoted to full professor in 1962. He remained in this position until his death in 1982.

Chase's academic specialties were American constitutional law and public law. Topics of particular focus included state and local governments and United States federal courts, especially the Supreme Court. He was an advisory editor in political science for Charles Scribner's Sons from 1962 to 1973 and an advisory editor to the Dictionary of American History in 1973.

On the Minnesota campus, Chase was known as a supporter of the Vietnam War and an opponent of loyalty oath requirements for federal student loans. He received a teaching award from the College of Liberal Arts. He served as acting vice president for academic administration from 1973 to 1974.

During his career, Chase held a number of visiting appointments, including at Columbia University, 1963–64; the Naval War College (as a civilian professor), 1965–66; and the University of Chicago, 1967–68. During his service in Vietnam, he taught at Huế University one day per week. At the time of his death in 1982, he was a visiting professor at the University of California, San Diego.

== Military and government service ==
Chase enlisted in the United States Marine Corps Reserve on September 9, 1942, during World War II. In May 1943, he was commissioned as a second lieutenant. Following additional training and service stateside, he was ordered overseas beginning in July 1944. He was wounded twice in the Battle of Iwo Jima (February 19 – March 26, 1945). He was released from active duty in January 1946, after the conclusion of the war.

Following release from active duty, Chase remained in the Reserve, rising to the rank of major general. He was called to active duty twice. From September 1950 to September 1952, during the Korean War, he led the Noncommissioned Officer Leadership School at Camp Lejeune and then commanded a Marine company. Then, from July 1968 to July 1969, during the Vietnam War, he served as a psychological operations officer with the III Marine Amphibious Force. During his Vietnam service, he earned the Legion of Merit with Combat "V", the Armed Forces Honor Medal 1st Class, the Gallantry Cross with Palm, and the Psychological Warfare Medal.

On October 21, 1977, President Jimmy Carter nominated Chase as Deputy Assistant Secretary of Defense for Reserve Affairs. The United States Senate confirmed the nomination the following November 2. In this role, Chase "was in charge of all reserve forces, including the National Guard." As secretary, Chase argued that peacetime draft registration had not increased National Guard or reserve enlistments. He also argued that the draft did not yield a higher-quality military than an all-volunteer force, with the Army suffering in particular as high-quality potential draftees signed up for the Air Force, Navy, and Marine Corps instead. To increase the quality and quantity of reserves, Chase advocated better pay and initiatives to encourage employers to give workers time off for training. He also ruled out future draft deferments for reserve or National Guard service or college, as had been allowed during the Vietnam War. He served until December 1980, following Carter's defeat by Ronald Reagan in the presidential election the previous month, and returned to his position at the University of Minnesota in 1981.

=== Officer ranks ===
Chase held the following officer ranks in the Marine Corps Reserve, as of the following dates:

Rank	Effective date
Second lieutenant	May 1943
First lieutenant	November 30, 1944
Captain	January 31, 1948
Major	June 28, 1952
Lieutenant colonel	September 1, 1959
Colonel	September 22, 1965
Brigadier general	July 1, 1971
Major general	March 7, 1975

=== Notable postings ===
Chase held the following notable postings within the Marine Corps Reserve:

Posting	Dates
Commanding officer, Marine Reserve Unit, Trenton, New Jersey	1952–1954
Administration officer, Marine Reserve Program, Naval Amphibious Base Little Creek, Norfolk, Virginia	1955–1957
With Research, Development and Studies, Marine Corps Headquarters	Summer 1967
Adjutant faculty member, Senior School, Quantico, Virginia	1969–1972
Assistant division commander, 4th Marine Division	1972–74
Deputy director, Personnel Procurement, Marine Corps Headquarters	July 1974 – September 1975
Assistant Director, Marine Corps Reserve	September 1975

In addition, Defense Secretary Donald Rumsfeld appointed Chase to the Reserve Forces Policy Board in 1976.

== Death and legacy ==
On January 12, 1982, while in San Diego, California, as a visiting professor at the University of California, San Diego, Chase died following a heart attack. His funeral and burial were at Arlington National Cemetery.

The Marine Corps Association sponsors an annual essay contest named after Chase. The prompt is for essays that "articles that challenge conventional wisdom by proposing change to a current Marine Corps directive, policy, custom, or practice." According to the association, the spirit of the essay accords with Chase's belief "that the Marine Corps' strength and its usefulness to the country stemmed in large measure from its intellectual openness and from its ability to accept change."
