= Chase =

Chase or CHASE may refer to:

== Businesses ==
- Chase Bank, a national American financial institution
- Chase UK, a British retail bank
- Chase Aircraft (1943–1954), a defunct American aircraft manufacturer
- Chase Coaches, a defunct bus operator in England
- Chase Corporation (1970s–1989), a defunct New Zealand property developer
- Chase Motor Truck Company (1907–1919), a defunct vehicle manufacturer
- Chase, a brand of bicycle made by Cannondale Bicycle Corporation

== Fictional characters ==
- Chase, a character from the horror comic series Witch Creek Road
- Chase in the Paw Patrol animated television series and franchise
- Dell "Chase" Brandstone, fictional boundary warden of The Sword of Truth epic fantasy novels
- Jennifer "Pilot" Chase, in the TV series Captain Power and the Soldiers of the Future
- Magnus Chase, appearing in the Magnus Chase and the Gods of Asgard book series, by bestselling author, Rick Riordan.
- Chase Redford, in the TV series Ever After High, who is the Red Knight and adopted son of the Red Queen.

== Film ==
- Chase (2010 film), an Indian film in Hindi
- Chase (2019 film), an American thriller
- Chase (2022 film), an Indian film in Kannada
- Chased (film), a 2011 British drama short

== Music ==
- Chase (band), a jazz-rock fusion band of the 1970s
  - Chase (Chase album)
- Chase (Djumbo album)
- "Chase" (L'Arc-en-Ciel song) (2011)
- "Chase" (Koda Kumi song)
- "Chase" (instrumental), a work by Giorgio Moroder
- "Chase", an opening theme for JoJo's Bizarre Adventure: Diamond Is Unbreakable
- Chase (The Boyz EP), 2020
- Chase (Minho EP), 2022

== People ==
- Chase (given name)
- Chase (surname)

== Places ==
=== Canada ===
- Chase, British Columbia, a village municipality in the Shuswap Country region
- Chase River, a river on Vancouver Island, British Columbia
- Chase River, Nanaimo, a community within the City of Nanaimo, British Columbia
- Chase Island, Nunavut

=== United States ===
- Chase, Alabama, an unincorporated community
- Chase, Alaska, a census-designated place
- Chase, Indiana, an unincorporated town
- Chase, Kansas, a city
  - Chase County, Kansas
- Chase, Louisiana, an unincorporated community
- Chase, Maryland, an unincorporated community
- Chase, Pennsylvania, a census-designated place
- Chase City, Virginia, a town
- Chase, Wisconsin, a town
  - Chase (community), Wisconsin, an unincorporated community
- Camp Chase, a Civil War staging, training and prison camp in Columbus, Ohio
- Chase County, Nebraska
- Chase Township, Michigan

=== Elsewhere ===
- Chase Line, a suburban railway line in the West Midlands, England
- Ku-ring-gai Chase National Park, a place in Australia
- Chase Vault, a burial vault in the cemetery of the Christ Church Parish Church, Barbados

== Ships ==
- USS Chase (DD-323), a destroyer in the United States Navy
- USS Chase (DE-158), a destroyer escort of the United States Navy
- USCGC Chase (WHEC-718), a high-endurance cutter of the United States Coast Guard
- USRC Salmon P. Chase (1878), a training ship of the United States Revenue Cutter Service

== Sports ==
- Chase (racing) or steeplechase, a type of horse race which is run over fences
- Chase Field, a baseball stadium in Phoenix, Arizona
- Chase (cricket), when a team needs a certain number of runs to win
- Chase Center, a sports and entertainment arena in San Francisco
- Chase (dog), former mascot of minor league baseball's Trenton Thunder

== Technology ==
- Chase (algorithm), an algorithm in database construction, to test if a decomposition is lossless
- Chase (lighting), an effect in which light sources are lit up sequentially
- Chase (printing), a (metal) frame that is used to contain a printing forme

== Television ==
- Chase (TV channel), a defunct Philippine television network
- Chase (1973 TV series), an NBC crime/adventure drama
- Chase (2008 TV series), a SyFy reality series
- Chase (2010 TV series), an NBC drama series
- "Chase" (House episode), an episode of House

== Other uses ==
- Chase (land), a British geographical term designating an area of privately owned land for hunting
- Operation CHASE, a former United States Department of Defense program
- Chase (comics), a DC comic book
- Chase (novel), by Dean Koontz
- Children's Hospices Association for the South East, a former charity in England, now Shooting Star Children's Hospices
- Chase plane, an aircraft that follows a subject vehicle
- Chinese H-alpha Solar Explorer, a space-based solar telescope

== See also ==
- Chace (disambiguation)
- Chaise
- The Chase (disambiguation)
- Chase Brook (disambiguation)
- Chase Building (disambiguation)
- Repoussé and chasing
