= Chase (given name) =

- Gender: Male
- Language: English

Origin
- Language: Old French
- Origin: Old French word Chacier meaning "to catch / seize"
- Meaning: Hunter or Huntsman
- Region of origin: England

Other names
- Alternative spelling: Chace; Chaise
- Nicknames: Chasey, Chaser
- Derived: Chasseur

Chase is a given name in the English speaking world, especially popular in the United States. The given name is a transferred use of the surname.

== People with the given name ==
=== A ===
- Chase Allen (disambiguation), multiple people
- Chase Anderson (born 1987), American baseball player
- Chase Austin (born 1989), American racing driver

=== B ===
- Chase Baird (born 1988), American musician
- Chase Baker (born 1988), American football player
- Chase Balisy (born 1992), American ice hockey player
- Chase Beeler (born 1986), American football player
- Chase Bisontis (born 2004), American football player
- Chase Blackburn (born 1983), American football player
- Chase Blasi (born 1994/1995), American politician
- Chase Boone (born 1995), American soccer player
- Chase Brice (born 1998), American football player
- Chase Briscoe (born 1994), American racing driver
- Chase Brooks, American soccer coach
- Chase Brown (born 2000), Canadian American football player
- Chase Bryant (born 1992), American singer-songwriter
- Chase Buchanan (born 1991), American tennis player
- Chase Budinger (born 1988), American volleyball player
- Chase Buford (born 1988), American basketball coach
- Chase Bullock (born 1986), American football player
- Chase Burns (born 2003), American baseball player

=== C ===
- Chase Cabre (born 1997), American stock car racing driver
- Chase Carey (born 1953), Irish-American businessman
- Chase Carter (born 1997), Bahamian fashion model
- Chase Cartwright (born 1992), American football coach
- Chase N. Cashe (born 1987), American songwriter
- Chase A. Clark (1883–1966), American judge
- Chase Claypool (born 1998), Canadian-born American football player
- Chase Clement (born 1986), American football player
- Chase Clement (tight end) (born 1989), American football player
- Chase Clements (1901–1971), American football player
- Chase Coffman (born 1986), American football player
- Chase Coleman III (born 1975), American hedge fund manager
- Chase Corbin, American voice actor
- Chase Cota (born 1999), American football player
- Chace Crawford (born 1985), American actor
- Chase Crawford (born 1996), American actor

=== D ===
- Chase Daniel (born 1986), American football player
- Chase d'Arnaud (born 1987), American baseball player
- Chase Davis (born 2001), American baseball player
- Chase De Jong (born 1993), American baseball player
- Chase DeLauter (born 2001), American baseball player
- Chase De Leo (born 1995), American ice hockey player
- Chase Dollander (born 2001), American baseball player

=== E ===
- Chase Edmonds (born 1996), American football player
- Chase Elliott (born 1995), American racing driver
- Chase Ellison (born 1993), American actor

=== F ===
- Chase Farris (born 1993), American football player
- Chase Fieler (born 1992), American basketball player
- Chase Finlay (born 1990), American ballet dancer
- Chase Ford (born 1990), American football player
- Chase Fourcade (born 1997), American football player
- Chase Fraser (born 1995), Canadian lacrosse player

=== G ===
- Chase Garbers (born 1999), American football player
- Chase Gasper (born 1996), American soccer player
- Chase Griffin (born 2000), American football player

=== H ===
- Chase Hanna (born 1994), American golfer
- Chase Hansen (born 1993), American football player
- Chase Harrison (born 1984), American soccer player
- Chase Headley (born 1984), American baseball player
- Chase Hendricks (born 2005), American football player
- Chase Hilgenbrinck (born 1982), American soccer player
- Chase Holbrook (born 1985), American football coach
- Chase Holfelder, American singer-songwriter
- Chase Hooper (born 1999), American mixed martial artist

=== I ===
- Chase Icon (born 2001), American singer-songwriter
- Chase Infiniti (born 2000), American actress

=== J ===
- Chase Jackson (born 1994), American track and field athlete
- Chase Janes (born 2001), American racing driver
- Chase Jarvis (born 1971), American photographer
- Chase Jenkins (born 2004), American football player
- Chase Jeter (born 1997), American basketball player
- Chase Johnsey, American ballet dancer
- Chase Josey (born 1995), American snowboarder
- Chase Joynt, Canadian filmmaker

=== K ===
- Chase Kalisz (born 1994), American swimmer
- Chase Wilmot Kennedy (1859–1936), American army officer
- Chase Koch (born 1977), American businessman
- Chase Koepka (born 1994), American golfer

=== L ===
- Chase Lambin (born 1979), American baseball player
- Chase Langford (born 1960), American painter
- Chase Litton (born 1995), American football player
- Chase Lucas (born 1997), American football player
- Chase Lundt (born 2000), American football player
- Chase Lyman (born 1982), American football player
- Chase Lyons (1866–??), American baseball player

=== M ===
- Chase Mason (born 2002), American football player
- Chase Masterson (born 1963), American actress and singer
- Chase Matthew (born 1997), American singer-songwriter
- Chase Mattioli (born 1989), American stock car racing driver
- Chase McBride (born 1988), American songwriter
- Chase McEachern (1994–2006), Canadian hockey player
- Chase McGrath (born 1998), American football player
- Chase McLaughlin (born 1996), American football player
- Chase McQueen (born 1998), American triathlete
- Chase Meidroth(born 2001, American baseball player
- Chase Miller (born 1987), American racing driver
- Chase Minnaar (born 1986), South African rugby union footballer
- Chase Minnifield (born 1989), American football player
- Chase Minter (born 1992), American soccer player
- Chase Mishkin (1937–2022), American theatrical producer
- Chase Montgomery (born 1983), American stock car racing driver
- Chase C. Mooney (1913–1973), American historian
- Chase Morison (born 1992), South African rugby union footballer

=== N ===
- Chase Niece (born 1998), American soccer player
- Chase Nielsen (1917–2007), American air force officer

=== O ===
- Chase Oliver (born 1985), American politician
- Chase Onorati (born 1999), Zimbabwean swimmer
- Chase Ortiz (born 1985), American football player
- Chase Osborn (1860–1949), American politician
- Chase Owens (born 1990), American professional wrestler

=== P ===
- Chase Page (born 1983), American football player
- Chase Parker (golfer) (born 1991), American golfer
- Mary Chase Peckham (1839–1893), American poet, writer and reformer
- Chase N. Peterson (1929–2014), American physician
- Chase Petty (born 2003), American baseball player
- Chase Pistone (born 1983), American racing driver
- Chase Pittman (born 1983), American football player
- Chase Polacek (born 1989), American ice hockey player
- Chase Price (1731–1777), British politician
- Chase Purdy (born 1999), American stock car racing driver

=== R ===
- Chase Reid (born 2007), American ice hockey player
- Chase Rettig (born 1991), American football player
- Chase Reynolds (born 1987), American football player
- Chase Rice (born 1985), American singer-songwriter
- Chase Riddle (1925–2011), American baseball player
- Chase F. Robinson (born 1963), American historian
- Chase Roullier (born 1993), American football player
- Chase T. Rogers (born 1956), American judge

=== S ===
- Chase Sanborn (born 1956), Canadian trumpeter
- Chase Seiffert (born 1991), American golfer
- Chase Sherman (born 1989), American mixed martial artist
- Chase Shugart (born 1996), American baseball player
- Chase Silseth (born 2000), American baseball player
- Chase Simon (born 1989), American basketball player
- Chase Solesky (born 1997), American baseball player
- Chase Sowell (born 2004), American football player
- Chase Stanley (born 1989), New Zealand rugby league footballer
- Chase Stevens (born 1979), American professional wrestler
- Chase Stillman (born 2003), American ice hockey player
- Chase Stokes, American actor
- Chase Strangio (born 1982), American lawyer
- Chase Strumpf (born 1998), American baseball player

=== T ===
- Chase Tan (born 1991), Singaporean actor
- Chase Tang (born 1988), Taiwanese-Canadian actor
- Chase Tapley (born 1991), American basketball player
- Chase Tatum (1973–2008), American professional wrestler
- Chase Tenpenny (born 1991), American football player
- Chase Thomas (born 1989), American football player
- Chase Tramont (born 1979), American politician
- Chase Twichell (born 1950), American poet

=== U ===
- Chase Untermeyer (born 1946), American diplomat
- Chase Utley (born 1978), American baseball player

=== V ===
- Chase Vaughn (born 1988), American football player
- Chase Vosvick (born 1998), American soccer player

=== W ===
- Chase Walker (born 1998), American singer-songwriter
- Chase R. Whitcher (1876–1940), American architect
- Chase Whiteside (born 1988), American filmmaker
- Chase Whitley (born 1989), American baseball player
- Chase Wileman (born 1986), American soccer coach
- Chase Williamson (born 1988), American actor
- Chase Winovich (born 1995), American football player
- Chase Sui Wonders (born 1996), Chinese-American actress
- Chase G. Woodhouse (1890–1984), American activist
- Chase Wouters (born 2000), Canadian ice hockey player
- Chase Wright (disambiguation), multiple people

=== Y ===
- Chase Young (disambiguation), multiple people

== Fictional characters ==
- Chase Stein, a character in the comic book series Marvel Comics
- Dr. Chase Meridian, Batman’s love interest in the 1995 film Batman Forever
- Chase McCain, the main protagonist from the Lego City Undercover video game trilogy
- Chase, a character in Total Drama Island
- Chase in the Paw Patrol animated television series
- Chase Matthews, a character in the Nickelodeon series Zoey 101
- Chase Davenport, a character in the Disney XD series Lab Rats
- Chase Herring, a politician from the fictional country Baltic
- Chase Charming, Sleeping Beauty's husband in Chris Colfer's The Land of Stories
- Chase Racelott, a racer from Cars 3
- Chase Redford, Red Queen's adopted son in Ever After High
- Chase Hollow, the main character of the webcomic Cinderella Boy

== See also ==
- Chase (surname), a page for people surnamed "Chase"
- Chase (disambiguation), a disambiguation page for "Chase"
