= The Chase =

The Chase may refer to:

== Film ==
- The Chase (1946 film), an American film noir
- The Chase (1966 film), an American drama by Arthur Penn
- The Chase (1991 film), an American television film by Paul Wendkos
- The Chase (1994 film), an American comedy starring Charlie Sheen and Kristy Swanson
- The Chase (2017 film), a South Korean crime thriller
- The Chase, a 2006 short featuring Sherard Parker

== Literature ==
- The Chase, a 1735 poem by William Somerville
- Homeward Bound; or, The Chase: A Tale of the Sea, a 1838 novel by James Fenimore Cooper
- The Chase, a 1796 narrative poem by Walter Scott based on the 1786 German verse Der Wilde Jäger by Gottfried Augustus Bürger
- The Chase: A Tale of the Southern States, a 1880 novel by Jules Lermina
- The Chase: A Story, a 1914 novel by Robert Murray Gilchrist
- The Chase, a 1922 short story collection with a illustrated frontsipece by Claud Lovat Fraser
- The Chase, a 1925 novel by Mollie Panter-Downes
- The Chase, a 1952 play and 1956 novel by Horton Foote, basis for the 1966 film
- The Chase, a 1952 novel by Richard Gibson Hubler
- The Chase (Spanish: El acoso), a 1956 novel by Alejo Carpentier
- The Chase, a. k. a. Pursuit, a 1962 novel by Richard Unekis, basis for the 1974 film Dirty Mary, Crazy Larry
- The Chase, a 1989 children's book by Roderick Hunt
- The Chase, a 1989 novelization of the 1965 serial by John Peel
- The Chase: A Collection of Poems 1941–1989, a 1991 collection of poems by John Figueroa
- The Chase, a 1999 novel by Nancy Rue, the second installment in the Christian Heritage Series: The Chicago Years sequence
- Lionboy: The Chase, a 2003 novel by Zizou Corder, the second installment in the Lionboy series
- The Chase, a 2004 novel by Lynsay Sands, the third installment in The Deed series
- The Chase (Cussler novel), a 2007 novel by Clive Cussler, the first installment in the Isaac Bell series
- The Chase, a 2014 novel by Janet Evanovich and Lee Goldberg
- The Chase (Fox novel), a 2021 novel by Candice Fox

== Music ==
=== Albums ===
- The Chase (Garth Brooks album)
- The Chase (Illy album)
- The Chase (Marit Larsen album)
- The Chase (Manafest album)
- The Chase (Wolfstone album)
- The Chase (single album), a 2025 single album by Hearts2Hearts
- The Chase!, a 1970 album by Dexter Gordon and Gene Ammons

=== Songs ===
- "Chase" (instrumental) or "The Chase", an instrumental by Giorgio Moroder
- "The Chase" (Hearts2Hearts song)
- "The Chase", a song by The Camelots
- "The Chase", a song by Clinic, produced for the film Road to Salina
- "The Chase", an instrumental by Howard Jones, a B-side of the single No One Is to Blame
- "The Chase", a song by Queensrÿche from Operation: Mindcrime II
- "The Chase", an interlude by R. Kelly from R.
- "The Chase", a song by Rednex from The Best of the West
- "The Chase, a song by RZA from the Bulworth soundtrack
- "The Chase", an instrumental by Jan Hammer from the Miami Vice soundtrack
- "The Chase", a 2018 track by Toby Fox from Deltarune Chapter 1 OST from the video game Deltarune
- "The Chase", a song by Tinashe from 333

== Television ==
=== Episodes ===
- "The Chase", Alyas Robin Hood season 1, episode 19 (2016)
- "The Chase", Avatar: The Last Airbender season 2, episode 8 (2006)
- "The Chase", Barney & Friends season 11, episode 14b (2007)
- "The Chase", Bush Mechanics episode 3 (2001)
- "The Chase", Butch Patterson: Private Dick season 1, episode 11 (1999)
- "The Chase", Cain at Abel episode 44 (2019)
- "The Chase", Desperate Housewives season 6, episode 16 (2010)
- The Chase (Doctor Who), Doctor Who season 2, serial 16, episodes 30–35 (1965)
- "The Chase", Dragon Lady episode 83 (2019)
- "The Chase", Freedom episode 2 (2000)
- "The Chase", Have Gun – Will Travel season 2, episode 29 (1959)
- "The Chase", High Tide season 1, episode 21 (1995)
- "The Chase", Katakuti episode 5 (2022)
- "The Chase", Land of the Giants season 1, episode 26 (1969)
- "The Chase", Lassie season 6, episode 31 (1960)
- "The Chase", Paradise season 2, episode 21 (1990)
- "The Chase", SilverHawks episode 46 (1986)
- "The Chase", Sistas season 3, episode 6 (2021)
- "The Chase", Spyforce episode 25 (1972)
- "The Chase" (Star Trek: The Next Generation) season 6, episode 20 (1993)
- "The Chase", Surfside 6 season 1, episode 22 (1961)
- "The Chase", Tales of Tomorrow season 2, episode 5 (1952)
- "The Chase", The Adventures of Clint and Mac episode 8 (1958)
- "The Chase", The Beachcomber episode 6 (1962)
- "The Chase", The Bill series 7, episode 2 (1991)
- "The Chase", The Fall Guy season 2, episode 22 (1983)
- "The Chase", The First 48 season 11, episode 15a (2011)
- "The Chase", The Forest Rangers season 1, episode 9 (1964)
- "The Chase", Under the Skin episode 8 (1994)
- "The Chase", Widows' Web episode 30 (2022)
- "The Chase", Zorro season 2, episode 8 (1990)

=== Shows ===
- The Chase (British game show), a British game show
  - The Chase (American game show), the American adaptation
  - The Chase Australia, the Australian adaptation
  - The Chase New Zealand, the New Zealand adaptation
- The Chase (2006 TV series), a British drama series

== Other uses ==
- The Chase Nature Reserve, a nature reserve in London, England
- The Chase School, a school in Malvern, Worcestershire, England
- Vytis (lit. 'The Chase'), the heraldic coat of arms of Lithuania
- The Chase (Brack), a 1959 painting by John Brack
- The Chase (NASCAR), NASCAR's championship playoff system

== See also ==
- Chase (disambiguation)
