= The Camelots =

The Camelots may refer to:

- The paramilitary wing of Action Française in the 1930s Camelots du Roi
- The Camelots (doo wop group), 1960s, led by Davie Nichols
- The Camelots (rock band), 1960s, led by Mike Appell
