= Chace =

Chace may refer to:

== People ==
=== Surname Chace ===
See also: Chase (surname).

- Chace (surname)

=== Given name Chace ===
==== Fist name Chace ====
See also: Chase (given name).

- Chace Crawford (born 1985), American actor

==== Other names Chace ====
- Mary Chace Peckham (1839–1893), American poet, writer and reformer

== School ==
- Chace Community School, secondary school in Enfield, England

== Science ==
- ChACE, Spectrometer onboard Moon Impact Probe of India's Chandrayaan-1 mission.

== Other ==
- French version of the caccia, a musical genre
- Chacé, municipality in the Maine-et-Loire department, France

== See also ==
- Chase (disambiguation)
