= Chase River =

River on Vancouver Island, British Columbia, Canada

Chase River Kulwulton
- Location of river mouth Chase River (Canada)

Location
- Country: Canada
- Province: British Columbia

Physical characteristics
- Source: Mount Benson
- Mouth
  - location: Nanaimo Harbour
  - coordinates: 49°08′10″N 123°55′09″W
  - elevation: 0 m (0 ft)

Chase River is a river on Vancouver Island in the Canadian province of British Columbia. It discharging into the Strait of Georgia at the south end of Nanaimo Harbour. It is the namesake of the city of Nanaimo's neighbourhood of Chase River.

== River's course ==
The source of Chase River is on the south-west side of Mount Benson. From there it travels in an eastwardly direction towards Nanaimo, where it goes through Colliery Dam Park and the neighbourhoods of Harewood and Chase River before emptying into Nanaimo Harbour in the Nanaimo River estuary.

== History ==
In the winter of 1852–53, a Scottish shepherd, Peter Brown, was killed by two natives, one from Cowichan the other from Snuneymuxw. The Snuneymuxw man, hearing that the governor and troops would be hunting him, fled. He was easily tracked and captured because of the fresh-falling snow making his tracks easy to find and follow. The "chase" ended at this river.

They were tried on the ship SS Beaver on 17 January 1853 and hung the same day at Execution Point on Douglas Island. Execution Point got its name from those hangings. It was renamed in 1960 to Gallows Point and Douglas Island was renamed Protection Island.

== Colliery Dam Park ==
In 1910-1911, a series of dams were built by the along the river by the Western Fuel Company to supply water to the miners for coal washing. As a secondary use, homes near the water pipeline were allowed to use the water for domestic purposes. Eventually, most of the water for South Harewood received its water from this source. The city of Nanaimo turned this area into a park with swimming, walking trails, and picnicking.

== Chase River Fault ==
The Chase River Fault, a strike-slip tectonic fault line bisects the park, along the path of the Chase River and the reservoirs that make up the Colliery Dam. Evidence of the fault in the form of striking fissure crevasses and chasms can be seen in several locations within and around the park. One such chasm known to locals simply as The Abyss, located about 1 kilometre (0.62 mi) from Upper Colliery Dam, has become a popular destination for tourists, hikers, and geologists.

== See also ==
- List of rivers of British Columbia
