= Trenton Thunder =

- Founded in 1994; Trenton, New Jersey

Team logo	Cap insignia

Minor league affiliations
- Class: Collegiate summer (2021–present)
- Previous classes: Double-A (1994–2020)
- League: MLB Draft League (2021–present)
- Previous leagues: Eastern League (1994–2020)

Major league affiliations
- Team: Unaffiliated (2021–present)
- Previous teams: New York Yankees (2003–2020); Boston Red Sox (1995–2002); Detroit Tigers (1994)

Minor league titles
- League titles (5): 2007; 2008; 2013; 2019; 2021
- Division titles (12): 1995; 1996; 1999; 2006; 2007; 2008; 2010; 2012; 2016; 2017; 2018; 2019

Team data
- Name: Trenton Thunder (1994–present)
- Colors: Navy, royal blue, yellow, gray, white
- Mascots: Boomer and Cloudman, Slice
- Ballpark: Trenton Thunder Ballpark (1994–present)
- Owner(s)/ Operator(s): Diamond Baseball Holdings; Pat Battle, Peter B. Freund
- General manager: Jon Bodnar
- Manager: Shawn Chacón
- Website: mlbdraftleague.com/trenton

The Trenton Thunder are a collegiate summer baseball team in the MLB Draft League, based in Trenton, New Jersey. They play their home games at Trenton Thunder Ballpark. From 1994 to 2020, they were a Double-A team in the Eastern League, affiliated with the Detroit Tigers (1994), Boston Red Sox (1995–2002), and New York Yankees (2003–2020). Following Major League Baseball's minor league reorganization, they joined the MLB Draft League as an unaffiliated team in 2021.

From 1994 to 2020, the team was a member of Minor League Baseball, participating in the Double-A Eastern League until Major League Baseball's reorganization of the minors following the 2020 season. Immediately prior to this, the Thunder were the Double-A affiliate of the New York Yankees and had been since 2003.

== History ==
=== As a member of Minor League Baseball/Eastern League ===
Trenton Thunder Baseball was established in 1994 with the relocation of the London Tigers from London, Ontario to Trenton, New Jersey, the London Tigers played at historic Labatt Park and served as a Detroit Tigers affiliate. The London Tigers were previously based at East Field Stadium in Glens Falls, New York under the names Glens Falls White Sox (1980–1985) as a Chicago White Sox affiliate and Glens Falls Tigers (1986–1988) as a Detroit Tigers affiliate. The Tigers affiliation moved with the relocation from London to Trenton but it lasted for one season only before switching affiliations to the Boston Red Sox in 1995.

On June 4, 1994, Phil Stidham became the first Thunder alumnus to play in the major leagues, for the Detroit Tigers, giving up six runs on six hits, including two home runs, as part of a 21–7 romp by the Minnesota Twins. As a Red Sox affiliate, the club recorded three first-place finishes, but was eliminated from the playoffs in the first round each time. In 2003, the Thunder became the Yankees affiliate, and the Portland Sea Dogs became the new Red Sox affiliate. The switch reflected both teams' fanbases, as Central New Jersey is home to many Yankees fans, while Maine is home to many Red Sox fans.

In 2006, the Thunder became the first team in Minor League Baseball history to draw over 400,000 fans for 12 consecutive seasons at the Double-A level or below. Through 13 seasons, over 5.4 million people had attended a Thunder game.

Surpassing the previous mark of 8,729, set while Derek Jeter was on a rehab stint with the team, the Thunder set a new single-game attendance record on May 23, 2007, when 9,134 fans attended, to watch Roger Clemens make his second minor-league start, as he worked toward a return to the Yankees. On Sunday, July 3, 2011, a paid attendance of 9,212 set a new record, as Derek Jeter returned once again, for a rehab start.

On September 15, 2007, the Thunder defeated the Akron Aeros to win their first Eastern League Championship Series in team history. Trenton defended its league title with 5–1 win over the Aeros on September 14, 2008. The Thunder lost to the Altoona Curve in the 2010 Eastern League Championship Series.

In 2013, the Minor League Baseball website named the Trenton Thunder the Minor League team of the year. Trenton also took home two other awards which included "Promo of the Year" for the Retirement Party for team bat dog Chase That Golden Thunder. The 13-year-old Golden Retriever retired this year and in his final game the team included a bobble head give away in honor of the long time mascot. The third award was for "Mascot of the Year" which included an online four minute which garnered the most hits of any other team's mascot video.

=== As a member of the MLB Draft League ===
On November 7, 2020, the Yankees announced that they would end their affiliation with the Thunder organization in favor of the previously independent Somerset Patriots, located in Bridgewater Township, New Jersey. The Thunder organization was offered the Patriots' spot in the Atlantic League of Professional Baseball. Instead, they became members of the newly created MLB Draft League, which serves as a showcase for draft-eligible prospects.

The Thunder organization won the first MLB Draft League title in 2021.

==== Triple-A Buffalo Bisons ====
In April 2021, it was announced that the Thunder organization would host the Buffalo Bisons, the Triple-A affiliate of the Toronto Blue Jays. “After 27 years serving as the Double-A home of the Detroit Tigers, Boston Red Sox, and New York Yankees, we are excited to welcome the highest level of Minor League Baseball to New Jersey,” said Jeff Hurley, Thunder GM & COO. “We look forward to working with the Bisons, Blue Jays, and Major League Baseball to make this a successful season start.” The Blue Jays began the 2021 MLB season by calling their spring training facilities in Dunedin, Florida, as a result of COVID-19 restrictions in Canada. Toronto had played the coronavirus-shortened 60-game 2020 season in Buffalo. According to the Bisons, the move to Trenton allowed the club to complete a joint renovation project to prepare Buffalo’s Sahlen Field for major-league regular-season games. Buffalo expects the upgrades will “far exceed the new required Major League Baseball Player Development League facility standards, making Sahlen Field one of the premier locations for player training and performance amenities in Minor League Baseball.”

At the Bisons home games in Trenton, the Bisons wore the Trenton Thunder uniforms and were referred to as Trenton Thunder while the Thunder MLB Draft League team was referred to as Draft League Thunder by the Thunder organization; the Bisons were still referred to as the Buffalo Bisons on the road and the Thunder MLB Draft League team was referred to as Trenton Thunder on the road. The Bisons played the season through July in Trenton and moved back to Buffalo for August. On September 4, 2023, Team President Jeff Hurley stated that the team's goal is to be affiliated again with a major league organization.

== Season records ==
=== Minor League Baseball/Eastern League ===
Season	Affiliation	Manager	Record
1994	Tigers	Tom Runnells	55–85, 5th place South
1995	Red Sox	Ken Macha	73–69, 1st place South (tie)
1996	Red Sox	Ken Macha	86–56, 1st place South
1997	Red Sox	DeMarlo Hale	71–70, 4th place South
1998	Red Sox	DeMarlo Hale	71–70, 3rd place South
1999	Red Sox	DeMarlo Hale	92–50, 1st place North
2000	Red Sox	Billy Gardner, Jr.	67–75, 5th place North
2001	Red Sox	Billy Gardner, Jr.	67–75, 5th place North
2002	Red Sox	Ron Johnson	63–77, 5th place North (tie)
2003	Yankees	Stump Merrill	70–71, 4th place North
2004	Yankees	Stump Merrill	64–78, 6th place North
2005	Yankees	Bill Masse	74–68, 2nd place North
2006	Yankees	Bill Masse	80–62, 1st place North
2007	Yankees	Tony Franklin	83–59, 1st place North
2008	Yankees	Tony Franklin	86–54, 1st place North
2009	Yankees	Tony Franklin	69–72, 3rd place North
2010	Yankees	Tony Franklin	83–59, 1st place East
2011	Yankees	Tony Franklin	68–73, 4th place East
2012	Yankees	Tony Franklin	79–63, 1st place East
2013	Yankees	Tony Franklin	74–67, 2nd place East
2014	Yankees	Tony Franklin	67–75, 4th place East
2015	Yankees	Al Pedrique	71–71, 3rd place East
2016	Yankees	Bobby Mitchell	87–55, 2nd place East
2017	Yankees	Bobby Mitchell	92–48, 1st place East
2018	Yankees	Jay Bell	79–61, 1st place East
2019	Yankees	Patrick Osborn	76–62, 2nd place East

=== MLB Draft League ===
Season	Affiliation	Manager	Record
2021	None	Jeff Manto	30–18–8, 1st place League
2022	None	Jeff Manto	29–43, 5th place League
2023	None	Jeff Manto	39–30, 2nd place League
2024	None	Adonis Smith	37-36, 2nd place League
2025	None	Shawn Chacón	37-39. 4th place League

=== Playoff appearances (Minor League Baseball/Eastern League) ===
- 1995 season: Lost to Reading, 3–0 in semifinals
- 1996 season: Lost to Harrisburg, 3–1 in semifinals
- 1999 season: Lost to Norwich, 3–2 in semifinals
- 2005 season: Lost to Portland, 3–2 in semifinals
- 2006 season: Lost to Portland 3–1 in semifinals
- 2007 season: Defeated Portland 3–1 in semifinals; defeated Akron 3–1 in championship series.
- 2008 season: Defeated Portland 3–0 in semifinals; defeated Akron 3–1 in championship series.
- 2010 season: Defeated New Hampshire 3–0 in semifinals; lost to Altoona 3–1 in championship series.
- 2012 season: Defeated Reading 3–1 in semifinals; lost to Akron 3–1 in championship series.
- 2013 season: Defeated Binghamton 3–0 in semifinals; defeated Harrisburg 3–0 in championship series.
- 2016 season: Defeated Reading 3–1 in semifinals; lost to Akron 3–0 in championship series.
- 2017 season: Defeated Binghamton 3–1 in semifinals; lost to Altoona 3–0 in championship series.
- 2018 season: Lost to New Hampshire, 3–0 in semifinals
- 2019 season: Defeated Reading 3–0 in semifinals; defeated Bowie in the championship series 3–1.

== Ballpark ==
Waterfront Park in 2007

The Thunder have played at Trenton Thunder Ballpark since the team's inception in 1994. The ballpark was previously named Mercer County Waterfront Park from its inaugural season until 2012, when it was renamed Arm & Hammer Park as part of a sponsorship deal with Arm & Hammer that lasted until 2021. Trenton Thunder Ballpark has a capacity of 6,440, the largest for any home ballpark in the MLB Draft League.

== Team culture ==
=== Mascots ===
==== Boomer ====
The Thunder's mascot is a blue "Thunderbird" named Boomer. He wears a Thunder uniform as well as purple and yellow shades. Boomer traditionally takes part in many of the promotions and activities throughout Thunder home games, such as a race around the bases against a young fan. Boomer's likeness has appeared on numerous pieces of merchandise, and he is involved with several programs assisting children in New Jersey and Pennsylvania.

==== Cloudman ====
Cloudman is the Thunder's heroic mascot, debuting during the 2015 season. He is a caped crusader who serves the greater good in the community. The Cloudman's Hometown Heroes program debuted in 2015. Fans have the opportunity to nominate local heroes in their community to be honored in the middle of the seventh inning of every home game. Current and former armed forces members, first-responders and individuals who do good in the community are often nominated. Cloudman can be seen all over Trenton Thunder Ballpark during a Thunder game, usually in tandem with Boomer, the Thunder's original mascot. Together Cloudman and Boomer take part in such in-game activities as shooting T-shirts off into the crowd, racing a youngster around the bases for a prize, and competing against one another to pick the loudest section in the stadium on a given night.

=== Batdogs ===
Chase "That Golden Thunder" was a Golden Retriever who was part of the Thunder family from late in the 2002 season until his death in 2013. He often served as "batdog" during the first inning at most Thunder home games, retrieving bats and balls and returning them to the Thunder dugout. Later in the game, Chase usually caught frisbees to win a cash prize for a lucky fan. Chase had garnered significant media attention, appearing on FOX, CNN, YES Network, UPN9, WNBC4, and even Japanese television. In 2008, Chase sired a litter of pups. One of the pups was trained to be his successor and was named Home Run Derby (or Derby for short) in a fan poll during the offseason. Another of the pups from that litter was named Ollie, and served as a batdog for the New Hampshire Fisher Cats until September 2016. Chase died July 8, 2013, aged 13. He was diagnosed with cancer in February and had been suffering from arthritis.

One of Derby's pups, Rookie, has been trained to keep the family business intact as a third-generation "batdog". In 2017, Rookie and Derby shared "batdog" duties with Rookie retrieving bats in the first inning and Derby retrieving in the second inning during every game. On January 8, 2018, Derby died from cancer. Rookie became the Thunder's batdog beginning with the 2018 season. In February 2020, the Trenton Thunder held a name contest after the announcement of their newest batdog puppy, which fans could vote on a list of names for the newest addition to the batdog family. It was decided the name for the 4th Trenton Thunder batdog is Dash. Dash is Rookie's cousin, which makes Dash a part of the official Trenton Thunder batdog family tree.

=== Alternate identities ===
In 2018, the team began to temporarily rename itself as the Thunder Pork Roll, honoring Trenton's role in developing the Pork roll. The Pork Roll would play every Friday home game at Trenton Thunder Ballpark wearing Thunder navy blue/light blue uniforms with a "Pork Roll" wordmark logo on the front. In 2024, the Thunder Pork Roll refreshed the original on-field uniforms, switching from blue to pink to further celebrate the local favorite breakfast food.

In 2019, as part of Minor League Baseball's Copa de la Diversion promotion to celebrate Latino heritage, the Thunder created the Spanish-language identity El Trueno de Trenton.

In 2024, the Thunder expanded on their long, pioneering tradition of bat dogs in the franchise, temporarily renaming themselves as the Trenton Goldens on select nights during the season. The Goldens first took the field on June 26, donning a white jersey with black accents with the Goldens wordmark across the chest, as well as a gold cap with the Goldens' G lettermark. In the second half of the season, the Goldens would return again wearing their secondary on-field cap- black with the Goldens hydrant logo. With the overwhelming positive response from fans, the Trenton Thunder announced the team would permanently keep the Goldens brand alongside their other identities.

On June 28, 2025, the Thunder transformed to the Trenton Tomato Pies, paying homage to Trenton's trademark dish.

== Ownership ==
Joe Plumeri, Trenton-born and Vice Chairman of the First Data Board of Directors, Joseph Finley and Joseph Caruso were the former owners of the Trenton Thunder. Together, they make up Garden State Baseball, LP. Both Plumeri and Finley also owned the Jersey Shore BlueClaws as American Baseball Company, LLC until July 2017. Finley also is part owner of the Lehigh Valley IronPigs.

On April 7 2026, it was announced that the team was sold to Diamond Baseball Holdings and that the baseball field of Trenton Thunder Ballpark will remain "Samuel J. Plumeri Sr. Field" in perpetuity.

== Roster ==
Trenton Thunder roster
Players	Coaches/Other
Pitchers: 6 Jude Abbadessa; 4 Joe Ariola; 64 Chris Billingsley; 21 Jerrette Bonet; 28 Collin Bosley-Smith; 35 John Carber; 63 Bryson Dudley; 31 Kai Fyke; 50 Clayton Johnson; 32 Gavin King; 29 Cooper McGrath; 11 Paulo Noris; 8 Andrew Ronne; 16 Eddie Smink; 44 Caden Spivey; 49 Aidan Waver; Catchers: 9 Tayloer Belza; 62 Jayden Melendez; 20 John Schroeder; 30 Evin Sullivan; Infielders: 26 Danny Corona; 61 Logan Dawson; 19 Harry Genth; 23 Rowan Masse; 15 Jakob Poturnak; 24 Carsten Sabathia III; 13 Michael Whooley; Outfielders: 37 Brayden Fraasman; 22 Aaron Graeber; 10 Jaden Sheffield; 14 JuJu Stevens; 17 Aaron Whitley	Manager: 0 Shawn Chacón; Coaches: 11 Ron Perodin (hitting); -- Bobby Jones (pitching); 7-day injured list; ~ Development list; # Rehab assignment; ∞ Reserve list; ‡ Restricted list; § Suspended list; † Temporarily inactive list; Roster updated June 25, 2025; Transactions; → More MiLB rosters

== Retired numbers ==
- 2: David Eckstein
- 5: Nomar Garciaparra
- 12: Willie Mays
- 18: Tony Franklin
- 33: Tony Clark
- 42: Jackie Robinson

Preceded by New Britain Red Sox	Boston Red Sox; Double-A affiliate 1995–2002	Succeeded by Portland Sea Dogs
Preceded by Norwich Navigators	New York Yankees; Double-A Affiliate; 2003–2020	Succeeded by Somerset Patriots
