= Daniel E. Krause Stone Barn =

- U.S. National Register of Historic Places
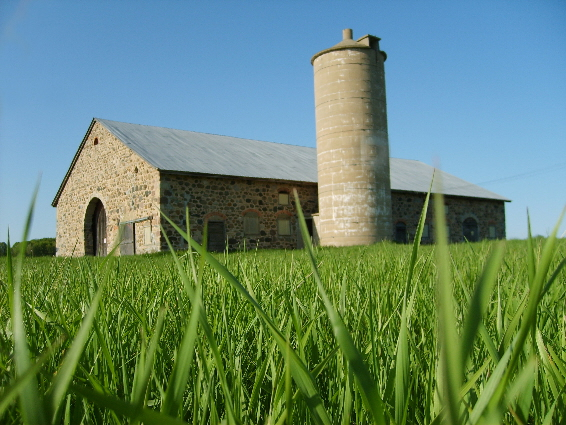
- Front and side of the barn

- Location within Wisconsin Location within the United States
- Location: Northeastern corner of County Trunk Highway S and Schwartz Rd., Chase, Wisconsin
- Coordinates: 44°43′6″N 88°10′43″W
- Area: less than one acre
- Built: 1903
- Architect: D.E. Krause, William Mensenkamp
- Architectural style: Stone barn
- NRHP reference No.: 00000810
- Added to NRHP: July 14, 2000

The Daniel E. Krause Stone Barn, also known as the Chase Stone Barn, is a historic barn in the town of Chase in Oconto County, Wisconsin, United States. Designed by farmer Daniel E. Krause and built by stonemason William Mensenkamp, the barn has become renowned for its historical significance.

== Construction details ==
Like many other barns, it was built of fieldstone, but in a unique fashion: its walls are more thoroughly stonework than most stone barns, and its massive arch entrances are large enough to permit the passage of large hay wagons through both ends. As of 2010, it is one of two remaining barns in Wisconsin to be constructed from fieldstone.

== Repair work ==
Seventeen years after its erection, the barn and the rest of its farm were sold by the Krause family in 1920. It had eleven owners between Krause's retirement in 1920 and 1954. During the mid-1950s, the property was purchased by two brothers, who operated the farm into the 21st century and oversaw significant repair work in the 1990s. By this time, the barn had experienced gradual structural deterioration and experienced a 1994 tornado. Accordingly, workers carried out a strengthening and refurbishing process in 1995, which included the removal of a small amount of stonework, its replacement by concrete, and the addition of large beams to strengthen the sagging walls.

== National Register of Historic Places ==
In 2000, the Krause Barn was listed on the National Register of Historic Places for its architectural significance. In 2009, the Krause Barn was nominated to be on America's 11 Most Endangered Places 2009 list.

== Preservation ==
Seeing it as a significant local landmark, local preservationists have concentrated on ensuring the survival of the barn: the town has purchased the barn, and after raising money to continue maintenance, there are plans to convert the barn and barnyard into a park and possibly a museum. The stable area is planned to have a "rustic agriculture museum" with displays on farming techniques from circa 1900 and antique farm equipment. Other plans include a stone bridge over a creek, a stone walk path, and a historic general store.
