= Ripken (dog) =

Retrieval dog in North Carolina (2016–2025)

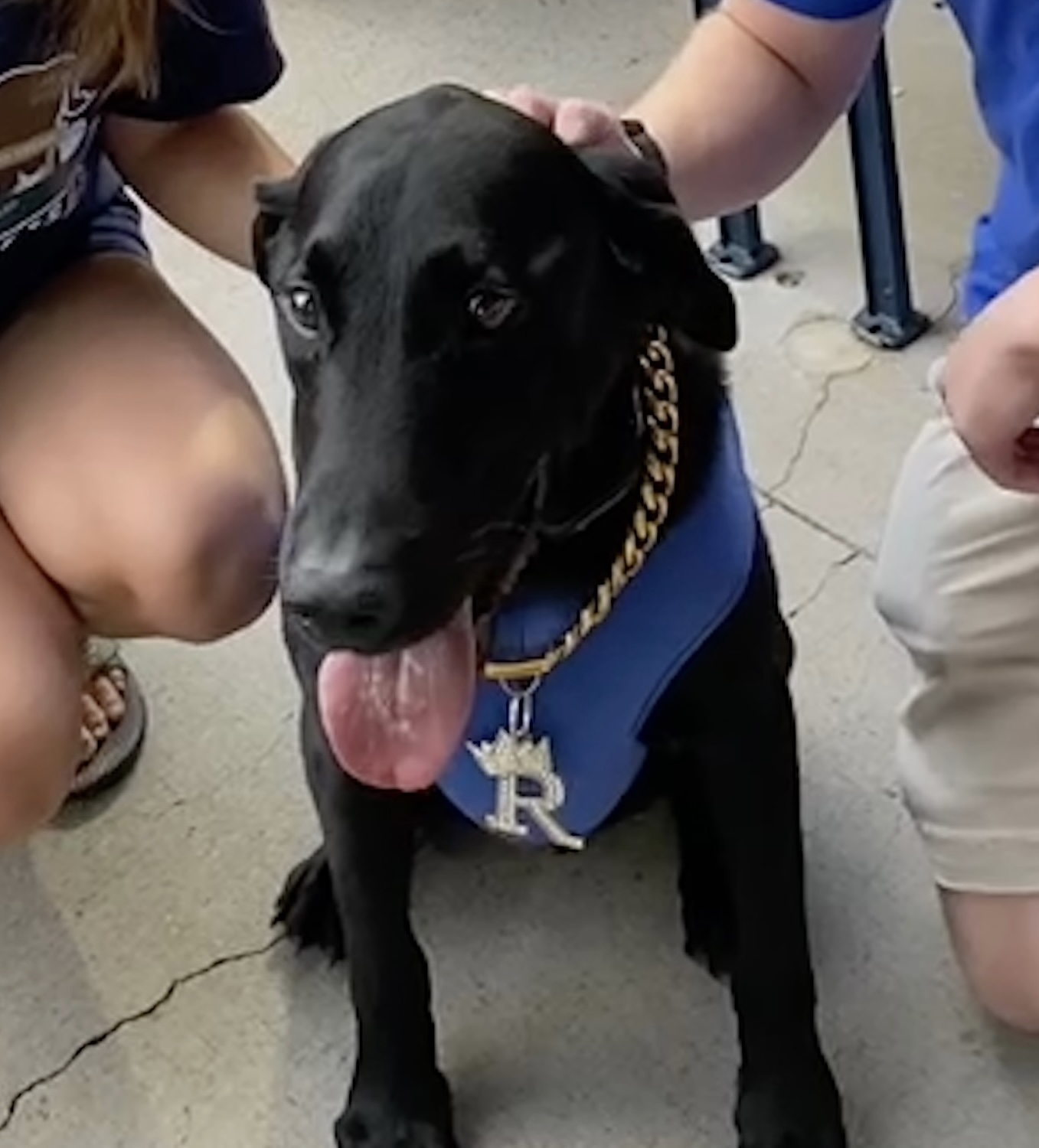
- Ripken at a Durham Bulls game in 2023
- Breed: Labrador Retriever
- Sex: Male
- Born: August 1, 2016; Boise, Idaho, U.S.
- Died: January 1, 2025 (aged 8); North Carolina, U.S.
- Occupation: Retrieval dog
- Employer: Sit Means Sit (Apex, Charlotte franchises)
- Years active: 2019–2025
- Successor: Champ
- Owner: Michael O'Donnell
- Parent: "Cowboy Kohl" (father)
- Weight: 70 lb (32 kg)
- Named after: Cal Ripken Jr.
- ripkenthebatdog.com

Ripken (August 1, 2016 – January 1, 2025), also known as Ripken the Bat Dog or Ripken the Tee Dog, was a black Labrador Retriever in North Carolina, who worked as a retrieval dog for the amateur baseball team Holly Springs Salamanders, the Minor League Baseball team Durham Bulls, and the North Carolina State Wolfpack college football team. During baseball games, Ripken retrieved bats thrown after hits, and during football, retrieved the kicking tee after a kickoff.

Born in Boise, Idaho, Ripken was named after Cal Ripken Jr., the Baseball Hall of Fame player for the Baltimore Orioles. Former college baseball player and coach Michael O'Donnell and his wife, Melissa, acquired the dog at eight weeks old. He was trained to retrieve baseball bats soon after, and began appearing in commercials produced by O'Donnell to promote his dog training franchise. In 2019, Ripken debuted with the Holly Springs Salamanders, where he retrieved bats and returned them free of saliva or bite marks. These traits helped Ripken to be noticed by the Durham Bulls, who recruited him in 2020. In 2021, Ripken began working for the Wolfpack by collecting kickoff tees. While working, Ripken wore a GoPro camera on his back which recorded his retrievals from a first-person perspective. These videos were posted to social media, where some became popular nationally, culminating in a guest appearance on The Kelly Clarkson Show in 2022. In 2023, Ripken dropped the ceremonial first puck at a Carolina Hurricanes hockey game. The same year, another black Labrador named Champ began to train alongside Ripken with plans to eventually serve as his replacement.

Ripken died on New Year's Day in 2025 from an undiagnosed medical condition. Condolences were offered by a number of official sport teams in North Carolina upon receiving the news, with a statue of Ripken requested to be built on NC State's campus as a memorial. Some of Ripken's jobs have been passed down to Champ as of March 2025.

== Early life ==
Ripken was born in Boise, Idaho, on August 1, 2016. He was named after Cal Ripken Jr., the Baseball Hall of Fame player for the Baltimore Orioles. His father, "Cowboy Kohl", served as the kicking tee retriever for the Boise State Broncos football team. Ripken weighed 70 lb (32 kg), according to his Minor League Baseball profile.

Ripken was acquired at eight weeks old by Michael O'Donnell, the founder and owner of the Sit Means Sit dog training franchise in Apex, North Carolina, from a friend and dog breeder in Boise, Idaho. O'Donnell, a former salesperson and college baseball player at Radford University, acquired the Apex franchise of Sit Means Sit in January 2016. He sought to train a dog to retrieve baseball bats, which combined his two interests. At ten weeks old, Ripken was taught to retrieve small novelty bats and glass bottles, gradually progressing to full-sized and metal bats as he grew older. Ripken eventually began to appear in O'Donnell's Sit Means Sit commercials as the Apex and Charlotte franchise's "spokesdog".

== Career ==
For the 2019 season, Ripken debuted for the amateur baseball team Holly Springs Salamanders, where he retrieved bats at home games without leaving slobber or bite marks or losing focus and roaming around. O'Donnell sought to have Ripken work for the Durham Bulls, a Minor League Baseball team which was closer to professional status; he also had a personal attachment to the team as he proposed to his wife on the pitcher's mound at one of their games. During the 2019–2020 off-season, Ripken was noticed by the Durham Bulls and asked to join, being announced as part of their team on February 27, 2020, but was prevented from working due to the COVID-19 pandemic largely halting live sports.

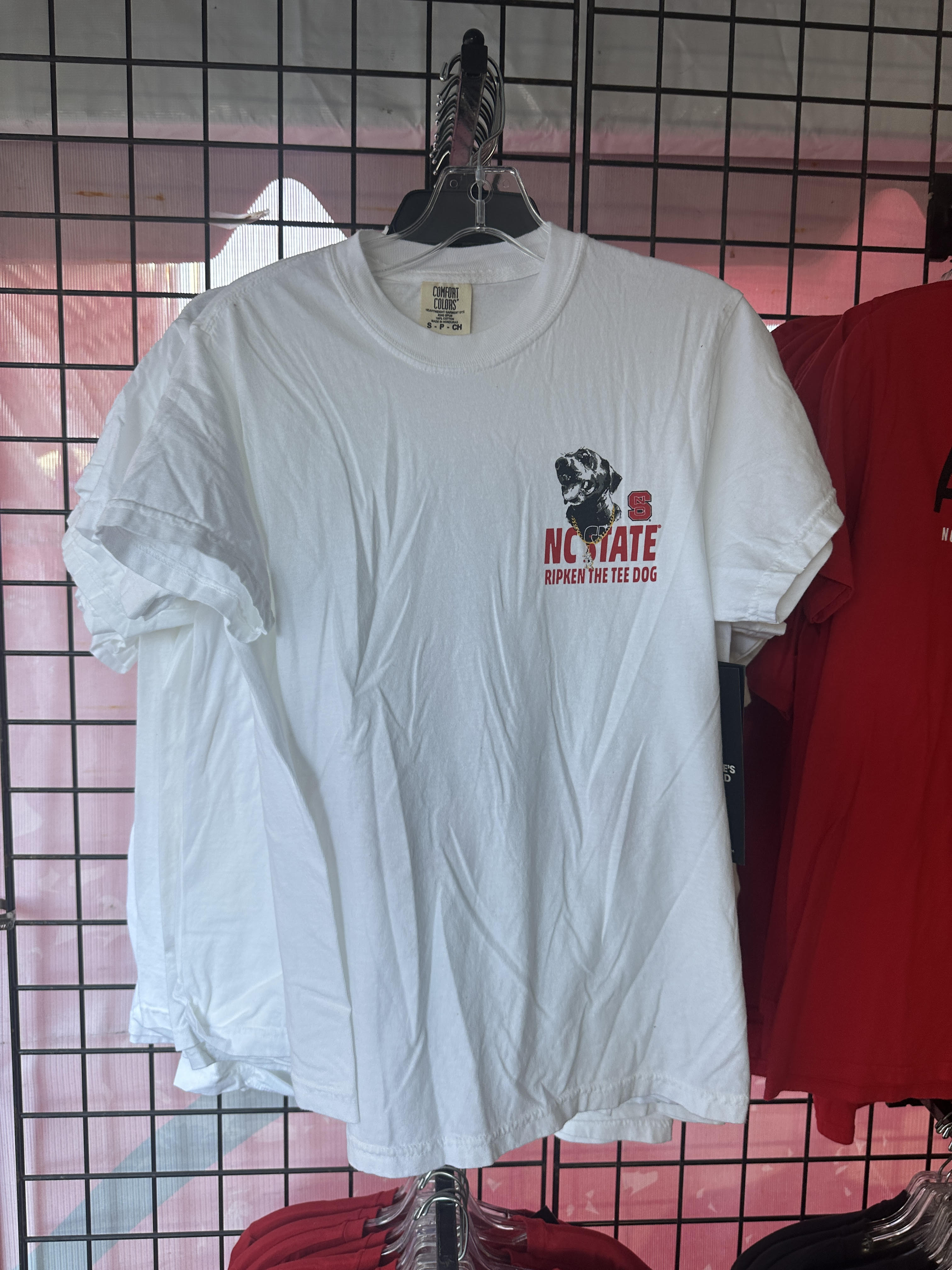
Ripken the Tee Dog merchandise at a North Carolina Wolfpack football game

For the 2021 season, Ripken debuted for the Durham Bulls to retrieve thrown bats after hits in the first three to four innings, before meeting fans and giving paw autographs. Ripken soon became popular with players, particularly with children in lengthening their attention spans of the game. When running out to the field, Ripken's GoPro camera attached to his back captured his retrievals from a first-person view, which were later posted on social media platforms. Ripken also wore a golden gem-studded necklace of his initial "R" wearing a crown while on the field.

The larger venue with the Durham Bulls brought more attention to both Ripken and O'Donnell's dog training business, leading Ripken to work for the NC State Wolfpack college football program starting their 2021 season, who approved after O'Donnell submitted a video from a Durham Bulls game. His job for the Wolfpack during the first season was to retrieve the kicking tee at the first kickoff of the first or second half of the game. Ripken was given more duties for the 2022 season, where he was responsible for retrieving kicking tees for the first half. He went viral on the social media platform TikTok in 2022; a video of him retrieving a tee at a game between NC State and Texas Tech reached nearly five million views. On November 10, 2022, Ripken was featured on The Kelly Clarkson Show.

The increased attention from social media led to Ripken being invited by the Carolina Hurricanes of the National Hockey League for an on-ice appearance. On February 18, 2023, Ripken dropped the ceremonial first puck at the Hurricanes game against the Washington Capitals. O'Donnell, who had trained Ripken on the puck drop in the weeks leading up, remarked the event was the "pinnacle of his career so far". On February 25, Ripken made an appearance at the Park Expo and Conference Center in Charlotte, North Carolina, with the aim of fetching tees for the state's National Football League team, the Carolina Panthers. On December 28, Ripken worked at the first-ever Pop-Tarts Bowl between NC State and Kansas State in Orlando, Florida. During the 2024 Durham Bulls season, Ripken worked in 14 games, or about one in every five home games. For the 2024 Wolfpack season in September, Ripken worked at the Duke's Mayo Classic between NC State and Tennessee.

== Death and legacy ==
Ripken died on January 1, 2025, at the age of 8, following complications from an undiagnosed medical condition. His death was announced by O'Donnell two days later on social media. Ripken last worked on December 22, 2024, retrieving the kicking tees for the Carolina Panthers against the Arizona Cardinals at their last home game. Official condolences were released by the Durham Bulls, Wolfpack athletics, and Carolina Hurricanes, alongside many on social media. At the time of his death, Ripken's account had about 431,500 followers on social media; around 274,000 came from TikTok with another 149,000 from Instagram.

In his lifetime, Ripken featured as the grand marshal at the annual Christmas parade in Fuquay-Varina, on Topps baseball cards, stuffed plushies by the Durham Bulls, and T-shirts sold by both the Durham Bulls and Wolfpack. The monthly golf magazine Golf Digest remarked in 2021 that bat retrieval dogs playing in Minor League Baseball, like Ripken, were what was needed in Major League Baseball to make the sport more enjoyable. Six days after his death, a statue of Ripken was requested to be built on NC State's campus as a memorial. As early as April 2025, Ripken served as the logo for "All-Star Dog Training", a new dog training company run by Michael and Melissa O'Donnell.

== Associate dogs ==
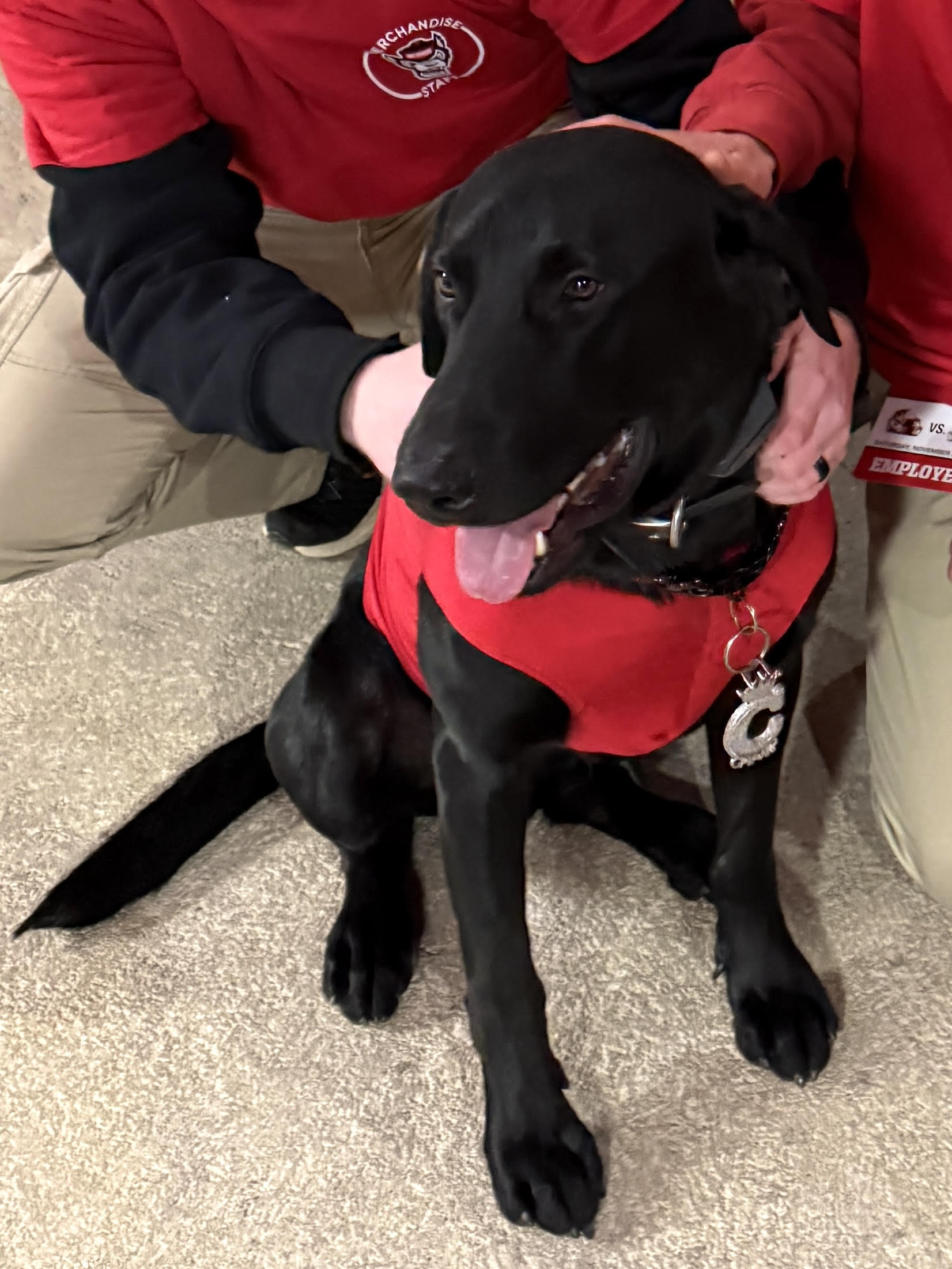
Champ at an NC State Wolfpack football game in 2025

At the end of the 2022 season, Ripken had a "younger cousin" or "nephew" associate dog named Rivers, named after the NC State football player Philip Rivers. Rivers, a younger Labrador Retriever, trained alongside Ripken in retrieving baseball bats and football tees with the intention to replace Ripken as he aged. Rivers appeared on the sideline at his first Wolfpack football game in November 2022. During the game, however, Rivers showed distaste towards people in hats, which was often the majority of people in a baseball stadium. Due to these issues, a decision was made in 2023 by O'Donnell to acquire Champ, another descendant of Cowboy Kohl from Boise, Idaho. Champ began working in rotation with Ripken at Holly Springs Salamanders games and at one NC State rugby game in the following 2024 season, intending to work for the Bulls and later Wolfpack games. Champ did not have any noted behavioral issues, but he had anxiety in larger stadiums, a condition Ripken did not have according to O'Donnell. This anxiety was reportedly treated each game. At one-and-a-half years old, Champ began to replace Ripken in his former jobs after his unexpected death in January 2025. On March 28, 2025, Champ was set to take over as the new "Official bat dog" of the Durham Bulls. O'Donnell's goal is for Champ to eventually work professionally in baseball, football, or golf.

== See also ==
- Chase (dog)
- List of individual dogs

Honorary titles
New title	Holly Springs Salamanders "Bat Dog"; 2019–2025	Vacant
New title	Durham Bulls "Bat Dog"; 2020–2025	Succeeded by Champ
New title	NC State Wolfpack "Tee Dog"; 2021–2025	Succeeded by Champ
