= Sit Means Sit =

American dog training franchise

- Company type: Private
- Industry: Dog training
- Founded: 1998 in Paradise, Nevada
- Founder: Fred Hassen
- Area served: United States; Canada
- Website: sitmeanssit.com

Sit Means Sit is a dog training franchise headquartered in Paradise, Nevada. It is the largest dog training franchise based in the United States, with over 120 locations in the United States and Canada.

== History ==
The company was founded in 1998 by Fred Hassen, who is CEO of Sit Means Sit. Sit Means Sit began franchising in January 2009. Later that year, Sit Means Sit gained notoriety when Hassen began to post dog training videos daily on YouTube. The company was named the top pet services franchise by Entrepreneur in 2014. Since 2019, a black Labrador Retriever trained by Sit Means Sit named Ripken became well known in North Carolina after serving as the 'official bat [retrieval] dog' for the amateur baseball team Holly Springs Salamanders and the Minor League Baseball team the Durham Bulls, and the 'official tee [retrieval] dog' for the college football team the NC State Wolfpack football games.

== Services ==
Sit Means Sit provides attention-based training to pets, police dogs, and service dogs. The training program uses a variety of training aids, including leashes, collars, food and toys. The Sit Means Sit training program also utilizes a proprietary remote electronic training collar that sends a low-level stimulus to the dog to get its attention. Some franchise locations offer pet boarding.
