= Dragon Lady (TV series) =

2019 Philippine television drama series

- Title card
- Also known as: Revenge of Dragon Lady
- Genre: Fantasy drama
- Created by: Renato Custodio
- Written by: Renato Custodio; Tin Novicio; Borj Danao; John Kenneth de Leon; Erwin Bravo
- Directed by: Paul Sta. Ana
- Creative director: Aloy Adlawan
- Starring: Janine Gutierrez
- Theme music composer: James Ryan Manabat
- Opening theme: "Ganito Ako" by Maricris Garcia
- Country of origin: Philippines
- Original language: Tagalog
- No. of episodes: 117 (list of episodes)

Production
- Executive producer: James Ryan Manabat
- Editors: Debbie Robete; Lawrence John Villena; Gervic Rocela Estella; Arturo Damaso
- Camera setup: Multiple-camera setup
- Running time: 22–31 minutes
- Production company: GMA Entertainment Group

Original release
- Network: GMA Network
- Release: March 4 – July 20, 2019

Dragon Lady is a 2019 Philippine television drama fantasy series broadcast by GMA Network. Directed by Paul Sta. Ana, it stars Janine Gutierrez in the title role. It premiered on March 4, 2019 on the network's Afternoon Prime and Sabado Star Power sa Hapon line up. The series concluded on July 20, 2019, with a total of 117 episodes.

The series is streaming online on YouTube.

== Cast and characters ==
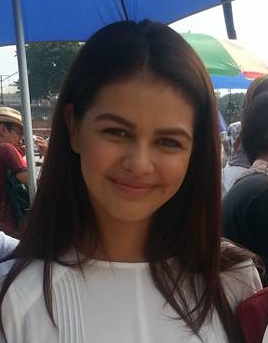
Janine Gutierrez portrays Yna Sanchez-Atienza.

Lead cast

- Janine Gutierrez as Celestina "Yna" Sanchez Chua-Chan / Scarlet Del Fuego

Supporting cast

- Tom Rodriguez as Michael Chan
- James Blanco as Bryan Atienza
- Diana Zubiri as Almira Sanchez-Atienza / Lavender Del Fuego
- Maricar de Mesa as Vera Lim-de Chua
- Joyce Ching as Astrid Lim de Chua / Astrid Lim Liu
- Edgar Allan Guzman as Goldwyn Chen
- Lovely Abella as Ginger Garcia
- DJ Durano as James Liu
- Aira Bermudez as Calista
- Odette Khan as Doray Orosco
- Raquel Villavicencio as Philippa Chua
- Julia Lee as Lotus Go

Guest cast

- Bea Binene as younger Almira / Lavender
- Kristoffer Martin as younger Bryan
- Derrick Monasterio as Charles Chua Jr.
- Isabelle de Leon as younger Vera
- Denise Barbacena as younger Ginger
- Leo Martinez as Wilson Lim
- Mosang as younger Doray
- Carlene Aguilar as younger Philippa
- JC Tiuseco as younger James
- Lorenz Martinez as younger Wilson
- Nicole Chan as younger Lotus
- Stanley Abuloc as younger Goldwyn
- Rafael Rosell as Matthew Chan
- Dexter Doria as Rebecca Chan
- Edicta Harteveld as younger Yna / Scarlet
- Zachie Rivera as younger Astrid
- Abel Napuran as Nando
- Carmen del Rosario as Ising
- Erlinda Villalobos as Nenita
- Shermaine Santiago as Gigi
- Rob Moya as Diego
- Ge Villamil as Flora
- Jason Francisco as Jeff
- Marika Sasaki as Jopay
- Chariz Solomon as Tintin Mapagmahal
- Kiel Rodriguez as Onyx
- Candy Pangilinan as Mimi
- Elle Ramirez as Salve Miranda / Scorfiona
- Claire Castro as Shane
- Mika Gorospe as Julie
- Samantha Lopez as Zoila Tengco

== Production ==
Principal photography commenced in February 2019. Filming concluded on July 15, 2019.

== Ratings ==
According to AGB Nielsen Philippines' Nationwide Urban Television Audience Measurement People in television homes, the pilot episode of Dragon Lady earned a 5.5% rating.

== Accolades ==
Accolades received by Dragon Lady
Year	Award	Category	Recipient	Result	Ref.
2019	33rd PMPC Star Awards for Television	Best Daytime TV Series	Dragon Lady	Nominated	
