= South Chase, Wisconsin =

- Unincorporated community
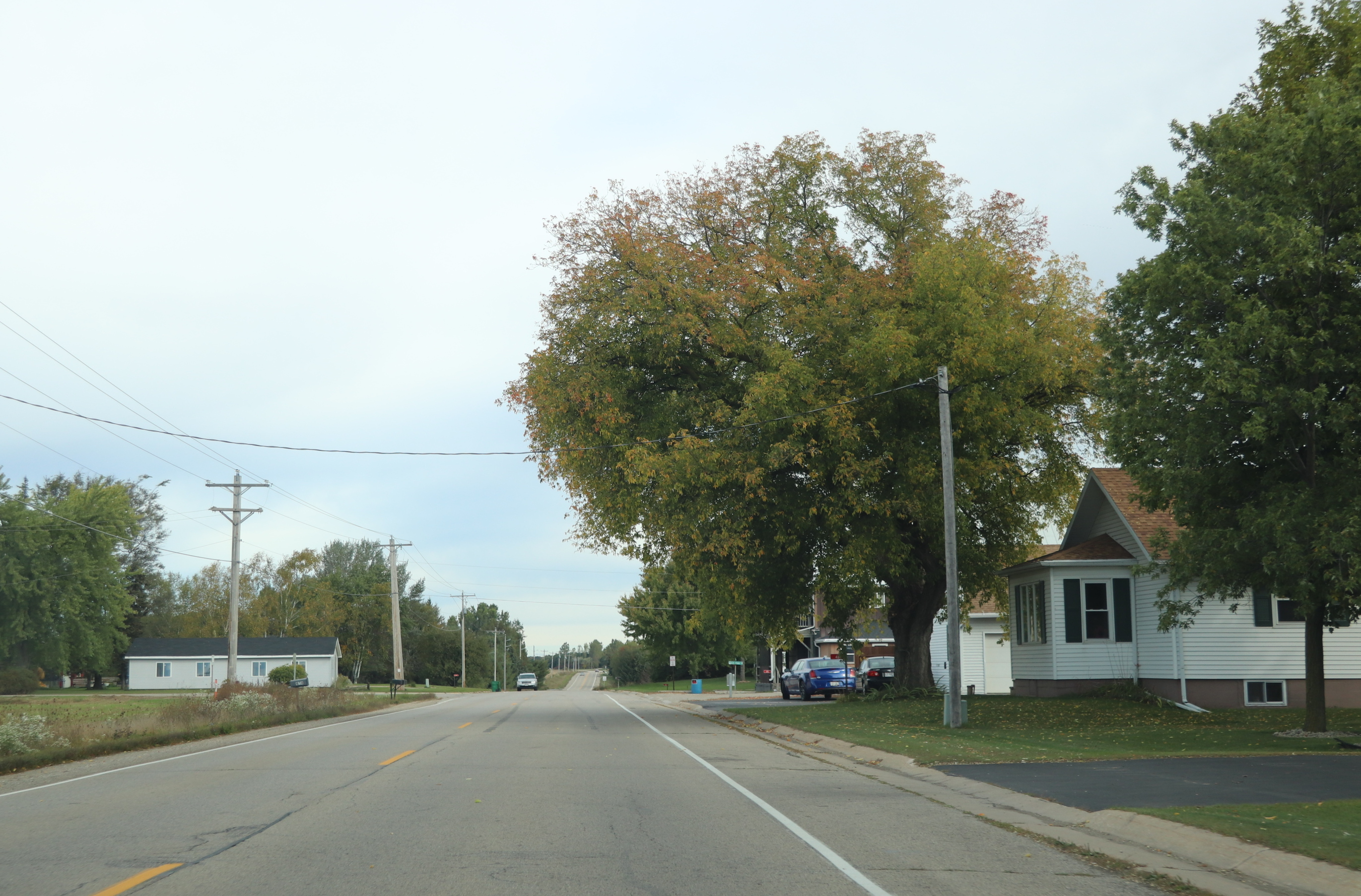
- Looking north at South Chase on County Highway C

- Location within Wisconsin Location within the United States
- Coordinates: 44°41′24″N 88°09′04″W
- Country: United States
- State: Wisconsin
- County: Oconto
- Elevation: 774 ft (236 m)
- Time zone: UTC-6 (Central (CST))
  - Summer (DST): UTC-5 (CDT)
- Area code: 920
- GNIS feature ID: 1577830

South Chase is an unincorporated community located in the town of Chase, Oconto County, Wisconsin, United States. South Chase is located on County Highway C, 4.7 miles (7.6 km) east-northeast of Pulaski.
