= List of Dragon Lady episodes =

Dragon Lady is a 2019 Philippine television drama fantasy series starring Janine Gutierrez and Tom Rodriguez. The series premiered on GMA Network's Afternoon Prime and Sabado Star Power sa Hapon block and worldwide on GMA Pinoy TV from March 4, 2019 to July 20, 2019, replacing Asawa Ko, Karibal Ko.

== Series overview ==
Month	Episodes	Monthly averages
Month	Episodes	NUTAM
March 2019	24	5.4%
April 2019	23	6.0%
May 2019	27	6.6%
June 2019	25	6.4%
July 2019	18	6.3%
Total	117	6.1%

== Episodes ==
=== March 2019 ===
Episode		Original air date	Social media hashtag	AGB Nielsen NUTAM People in Television Homes		Ref.
Episode		Original air date	Social media hashtag	Rating	Timeslot rank	Ref.
1	"Pilot"	March 4, 2019	#DragonLady	5.5%	#2	
2	"Malas o Swerte" (Bad Luck or Good Luck)	March 5, 2019	#DLMalasOSwerte	5.6%	#2	
3	"Sumpa ng Dragon" (Curse of the Dragon)	March 6, 2019	#DLSumpaNgDragon	5.5%	#2	
4	"Bangungot" (Nightmare)	March 7, 2019	#DLBangungot	5.5%	#2	
5	"Paalam" (Goodbye)	March 8, 2019	#DLPaalam	5.6%	#2	
6	"Desperado" (Desperate)	March 9, 2019	#DLDesperado	5.3%	#2	
7	"Salpukan" (Collision)	March 11, 2019	#DLSalpukan	5.2%	#2	
8	"Cursed"	March 12, 2019	#DLCursed	5.6%	#2	
9	"Celestina"	March 13, 2019	#DLCelestina	5.7%	#2	
10	"Wag Bully" (Don't be a Bully)	March 14, 2019	#DLWagBully	5.0%	#2	
11	"Janine is Dragon Lady"	March 15, 2019	#JanineIsDragonLady	5.5%	#2	
12	"Yna Sees Michael"	March 16, 2019	#DLYnaSeesMichael	5.0%	#2	
13	"Panganib sa Kalye" (Danger in the Street)	March 18, 2019	#DLPanganibSaKalye	5.5%	#2	
14	"Dahas" (Violence)	March 19, 2019	#DLDahas	5.4%	#2	
15	"Public Scandal"	March 20, 2019	#DLPublicScandal	5.5%	#2	
16	"Isang Milyon" (One Million)	March 21, 2019	#DLIsangMilyon	5.6%	#2	
17	"Kapahamakan" (Disaster)	March 22, 2019	#DLKapahamakan	5.4%	#2	
18	"Dumog" (Given)	March 23, 2019	#DLDumog	5.3%	#2	
19	"Announcement"	March 25, 2019	#DLAnnouncement	5.2%	#2	
20	"Sumpa" (Curse)	March 26, 2019	#DLSumpa	5.4%	#2	
21	"Plano ni Michael" (Michael's Plan)	March 27, 2019	#DLPlanoNiMichael	5.6%	#2	
22	"Sikreto" (Secret)	March 28, 2019	#DLSikreto	5.1%	#2	
23	"Pagrerebelde" (Rebellious)	March 29, 2019	#DLPagrerebelde	5.4%	#2	
24	"Betrayal"	March 30, 2019	#DLBetrayal	5.5%	#2	

=== April 2019 ===
Episode		Original air date	Social media hashtag	AGB Nielsen NUTAM People in Television Homes		Ref.
Episode		Original air date	Social media hashtag	Rating	Timeslot rank	Ref.
25	"Hagupit" (Rage)	April 1, 2019	#DLHagupit	5.3%	#2	
26	"Laban, Yna" (Fight, Yna)	April 2, 2019	#DLLabanYna	5.8%	#2	
27	"Pagtugis" (Pursuit)	April 3, 2019	#DLPagtugis	5.7%	#2	
28	"Kuyog" (Horde)	April 4, 2019	#DLKuyog	5.2%	#2	
29	"Kamatayan" (Death)	April 5, 2019	#DLKamatayan	5.2%	#2	
30	"Goodbye Dragon Lady"	April 6, 2019	#GoodbyeDragonLady	5.8%	#2	
31	"Who is She?"	April 8, 2019	#DLWhoIsShe	5.9%	#2	
32	"Scarlet del Fuego"	April 9, 2019	#DLScarletDelFuego	6.1%	#2	
33	"Resbak" (Fight Back)	April 10, 2019	#DLResbak	6.4%	#2	
34	"Desperado" (Desperate)	April 11, 2019	#DLDesperado	5.9%	#2	
35	"Seduction"	April 12, 2019	#DLSeduction	6.5%	#2	
36	"Scandal"	April 13, 2019	#DLScandal	6.3%	#1	
37	"Tokhang"	April 15, 2019	#DLTokhang	6.2%	#1	
38	"Positive"	April 16, 2019	#DLPositive	6.1%	#1	
39	"Paranoid"	April 17, 2019	#DLParanoid	6.4%	#1	
40	"Real Enemy"	April 22, 2019	#DLRealEnemy	5.7%	#2	
41	"Temptation"	April 23, 2019	#DLTemptation	6.9%	#2	
42	"Tukso" (Temptation)	April 24, 2019	#DLTukso	6.6%	#1	
43	"Lumuhod Ka" (Kneel Down)	April 25, 2019	#DLLumuhodKa	6.7%	#2	
44	"Naked Truth"	April 26, 2019	#DLNakedTruth	5.7%	#2	
45	"Hail Queen Scarlet"	April 27, 2019	#DLHailQueenScarlet	5.9%	#1	
46	"Reversal of Fortune"	April 29, 2019	#DLReversalOfFortune	5.6%	#2	
47	"Hagupit" (Attack)	April 30, 2019	#DLHagupit	7.0%	#2	

=== May 2019 ===
Episode		Original air date	Social media hashtag	AGB Nielsen NUTAM People in Television Homes		Ref.
Episode		Original air date	Social media hashtag	Rating	Timeslot rank	Ref.
48	"Frozen Labor"	May 1, 2019	#DLFrozenLabor	6.8%	#1	
49	"Shame on You"	May 2, 2019	#DLShameOnYou	6.7%	#2	
50	"Pahiya" (Embarrassed)	May 3, 2019	#DLPahiya	7.5%	#2	
51	"Selos" (Envy)	May 4, 2019	#DLSelos	6.1%	#2	
52	"Sugatang Puso" (Wounded Heart)	May 6, 2019	#DLSugatangPuso	6.3%	#2	
53	"Tamang Hinala" (Right Suspicion)	May 7, 2019	#DLTamangHinala	5.9%	#2	
54	"Caught in the Act"	May 8, 2019	#DLCaughtInTheAct	6.4%	#2	
55	"Pusong Bato" (Stone Heart)	May 9, 2019	#DLPusongBato	6.7%	#1	
56	"Michael or Goldwyn?"	May 10, 2019	#DLMichaelOrGoldwyn	6.2%	#2	
57	"In Denial"	May 11, 2019	#DLInDenial	5.9%	#2	
58	"Aminan" (Confessions)	May 13, 2019	#DLAminan	—N/a		
59	"Prove Yourself"	May 14, 2019	#DLProveYourself	6.5%	#1	
60	"Scarlet Heart"	May 15, 2019	#DLScarletHeart	6.4%	#2	
61	"Karma ni Michael" (Michael's Karma)	May 16, 2019	#DLKarmaNiMichael	6.4%	#2	
62	"Paandar ni Scarlet" (Scarlet's Startle)	May 17, 2019	#DLPaandarNiScarlet	6.2%	#1	
63	"Tuloy ang Laban" (The Battle Continues)	May 18, 2019	#DLTuloyAngLaban	6.0%	#2	
64	"Banta" (Threat)	May 20, 2019	#DLBanta	7.0%	#1	
65	"Revenge"	May 21, 2019	#DLRevenge	6.1%	#1	
66	"Guilty as Charged"	May 22, 2019	#DLGuiltyAsCharged	6.4%	#1	
67	"Alas" (Ace)	May 23, 2019	#DLAlas	6.7%	#2	
68	"Murderer"	May 24, 2019	#DLMurderer	6.5%	#2	
69	"Ako si Celestina" (I am Celestina)	May 25, 2019	#DLAkoSiCelestina	6.2%	#2	
70	"On Fire"	May 27, 2019	#DLOnFire	6.9%	#2	
71	"The Burning Question"	May 28, 2019	#DLTheBurningQuestion	7.1%	#2	
72	"Savage"	May 29, 2019	#DLSavage	6.8%	#2	
73	"Rest in Peace"	May 30, 2019	#DLRestInPeace	7.4%	#2	
74	"Bloody Red"	May 31, 2019	#DLBloodyRed	7.3%	#1	

=== June 2019 ===
Episode		Original air date	Social media hashtag	AGB Nielsen NUTAM People in Television Homes		Ref.
Episode		Original air date	Social media hashtag	Rating	Timeslot rank	Ref.
75	"Bomba" (Bomb)	June 1, 2019	#DLBomba	7.0%	#2	
76	"Akusada" (Accuser)	June 3, 2019	#DLAkusada	7.2%	#1	
77	"Takas" (Escape)	June 4, 2019	#DLTakas	7.0%	#2	
78	"Confrontation"	June 5, 2019	#DLConfrontation	7.1%	#2	
79	"User"	June 6, 2019	#DLUser	5.9%	#2	
80	"Salisi" (Oppose)	June 7, 2019	#DLSalisi	6.9%	#2	
81	"Mano Po" (Bless)	June 8, 2019	#DLManoPo	6.9%	#2	
82	"Lumiliit na Mundo" (Small World)	June 10, 2019	#DLLumiliitNaMindo	7.1%	#2	
83	"The Chase"	June 11, 2019	#DLTheChase	7.2%	#2	
84	"Dependence Day"	June 12, 2019	#DLDependenceDay	7.0%	#2	
85	"Underground"	June 13, 2019	#DLUnderground	5.5%	#2	
86	"Death Match"	June 14, 2019	#DLDeathMatch	5.6%	#2	
87	"Anong Sagot?" (What's the Answer?)	June 15, 2019	#DLAnongSagot	6.0%	#2	
88	"Eskapo" (Escape)	June 17, 2019	#DLEskapo	6.2%	#2	
89	"Good Luck or Bad Luck"	June 18, 2019	#DLGoodLuckOrBadLuck	6.6%	#2	
90	"Missing in Action"	June 19, 2019	#DLMissingInAction	6.0%	#2	
91	"Hero"	June 20, 2019	#DLHero	6.3%	#2	
92	"Apo Mo 'Sya!" (She's Your Granddaughter!)	June 21, 2019	#DLApoMoSya	6.4%	#1	
93	"Half Sisters"	June 22, 2019	#DLHalfSisters	5.9%	#2	
94	"Sabong" (Cockfight)	June 24, 2019	#DLSabong	6.0%	#2	
95	"Bastard"	June 25, 2019	#DLBastard	6.4%	#2	
96	"Susi" (Key)	June 26, 2019	#DLSusi	5.8%	#2	
97	"Pamilya ng Sinungaling" (Family of Liars)	June 27, 2019	#DLPamilyaNgSingungaling	6.1%	#2	
98	"Fake Death"	June 28, 2019	#DLFakeDeath	6.0%	#1	
99	"Scarlet's Game Plan"	June 29, 2019	#DLScarletsGamePlan	6.0%	#2	

=== July 2019 ===
Episode		Original air date	Social media hashtag	AGB Nielsen NUTAM People in Television Homes		Ref.
Episode		Original air date	Social media hashtag	Rating	Timeslot rank	Ref.
100	"Caught on Cam"	July 1, 2019	#DLCaughtOnCam	6.2%	#1	
101	"Prank"	July 2, 2019	#DLPrank	6.0%	#1	
102	"Totoong Heredera" (True Heiress)	July 3, 2019	#DLTotoongHeredera	5.9%	#2	
103	"Crowning Glory"	July 4, 2019	#DLCrowningGlory	6.0%	#2	
104	"Pamilya Pugante" (Fugitive Family)	July 5, 2019	#DLPamilyaPugante	5.8%	#2	
105	"Lucky 88"	July 6, 2019	#DLLucky88	6.1%	#2	
106	"Agaw Buhay" (Dying)	July 8, 2019	#DLAgawBuhay	6.0%	#2	
107	"Hayop Ka" (You're such an Animal)	July 9, 2019	#DLHayopKa	6.0%	#1	
108	"Singil" (Payment)	July 10, 2019	#DLSingil	5.8%	#2	
109	"Balimbing" (Betray)	July 11, 2019	#DLBalimbing	6.2%	#1	
110	"Traydor" (Traitor)	July 12, 2019	#DLTraydor	6.2%	#2	
111	"Double Cross"	July 13, 2019	#DLDoubleCross	6.0%	#2	
112	"Master Plan"	July 15, 2019	#DLMasterPlan	6.1%	#1	
113	"Trapped"	July 16, 2019	#DLTrapped	6.7%	#1	
114	"Baliw si Vera" (Vera is Crazy)	July 17, 2019	#DLBaliwSiVera	7.2%	#1	
115	"Huling Laban" (Final Battle)	July 18, 2019	#DLHulingLaban	7.0%	#2	
116	"End Game"	July 19, 2019	#DLEndGame	6.9%	#1	
117	"Nagliliyab na Wakas" (Fiery Finale)	July 20, 2019	#DLNagliliyabNaWakas	7.8%	#1	
