= Chase Motor Truck Company =

Defunct American motor vehicle manufacturer

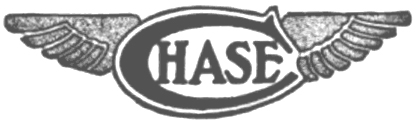
- Type: Truck manufacturing
- Industry: Automotive
- Founded: 1907; 119 years ago
- Founder: Aurin M. Chase
- Defunct: 1919; 107 years ago
- Fate: Bankruptcy
- Headquarters: Syracuse, New York, United States
- Area served: United States, Australia, Bulgaria, Canada, Great Britain
- Products: Vehicles; Automotive parts

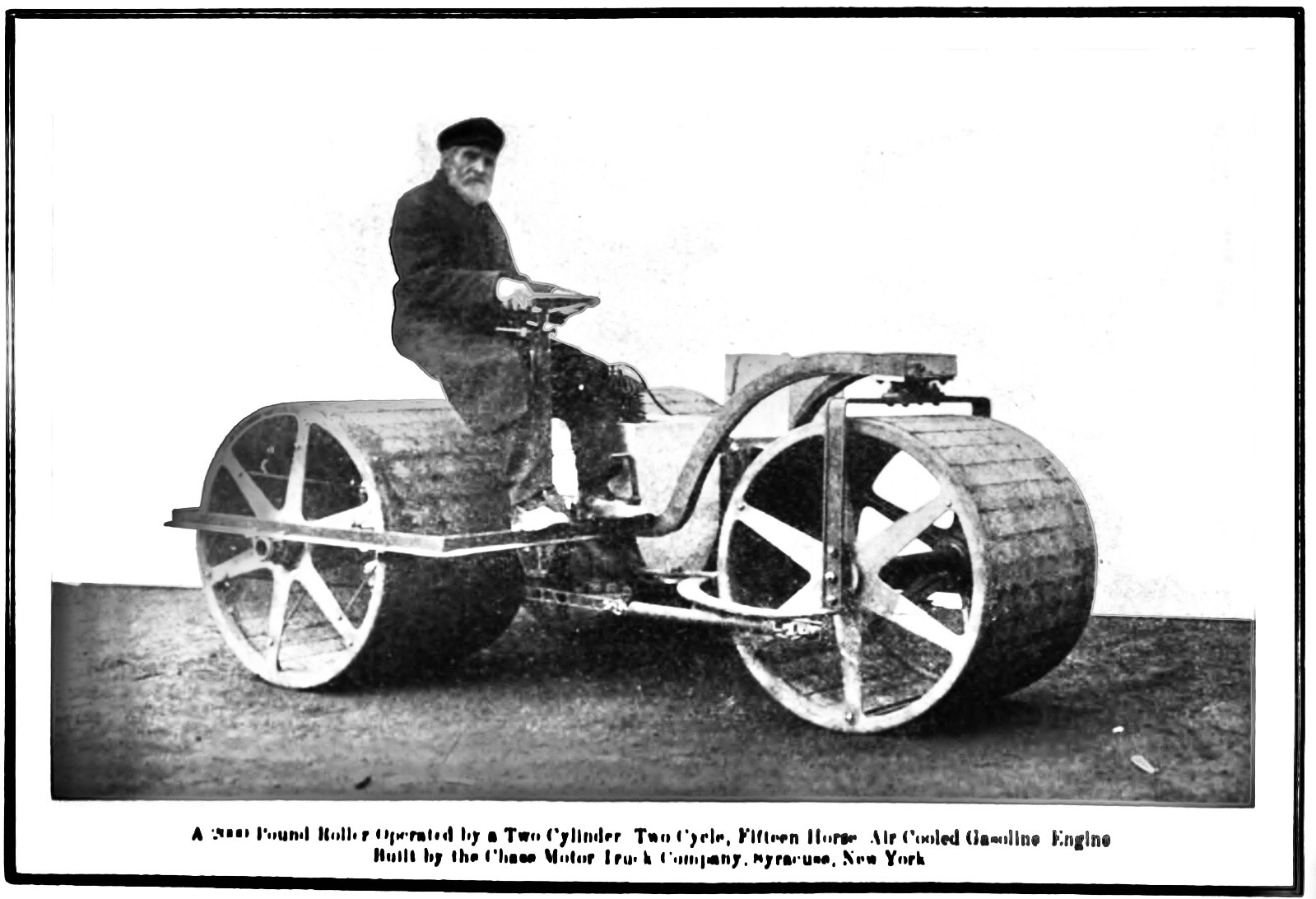
Chase Tractor-Roller two cylinder 15 hp (1908-1912)

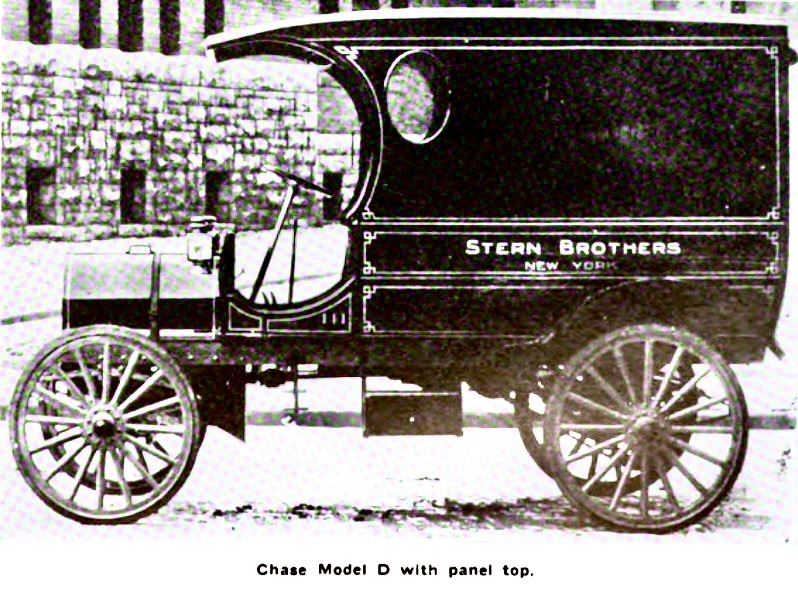
Chase Model D (1911) 0,5 to

Chase Motor Truck Company (1907–1919), founded by Aurin M. Chase, was a manufacturer of trucks in Syracuse, New York. It had an air-cooled engine.

The company also produced a 'an automobile, which could be converted for use in business or pleasure. With minor changes the car could also be utilized as a commercial vehicle.

It has been estimated that as many as 5,000 Chase vehicles were produced. Fewer than 30-40 Chase trucks are still in existence today.

== Models ==
- Model D, 0,5t
- Model T, 0,75t
- Model R, 2t
- Model O, 3t

== Gallery of advertisements ==
1910

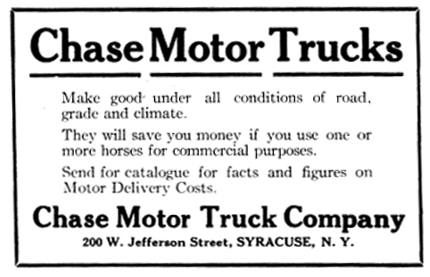
May 1, 1912

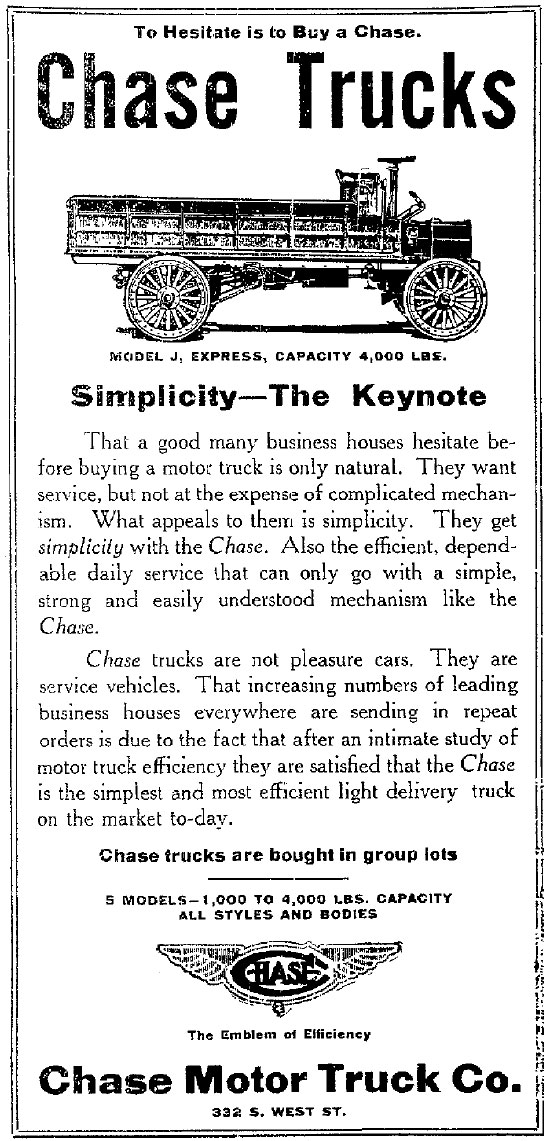
May 5, 1912

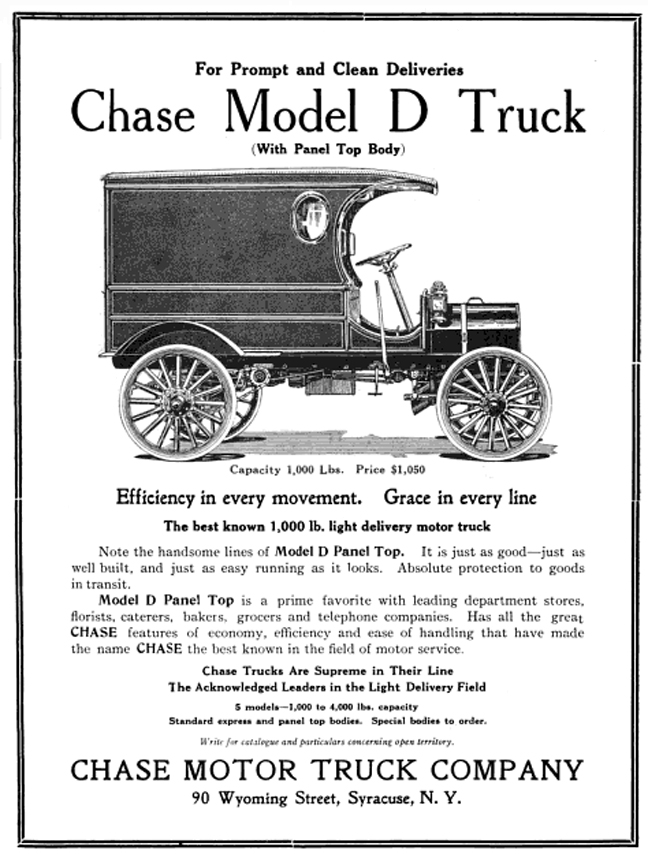
Model D, June, 1912

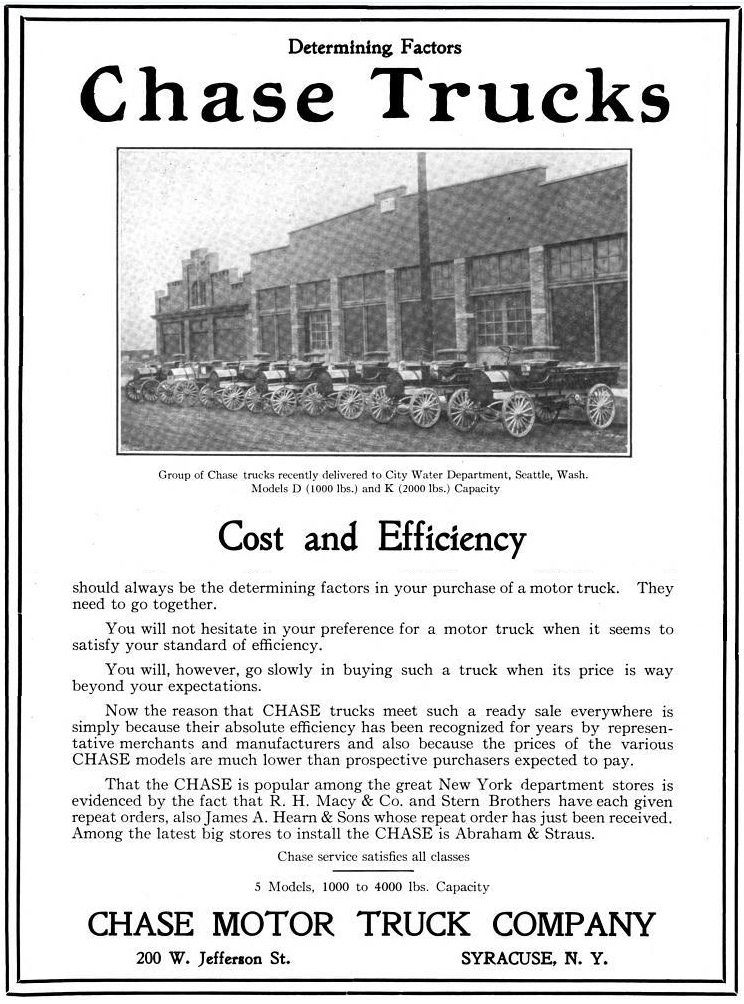
June 1, 1912

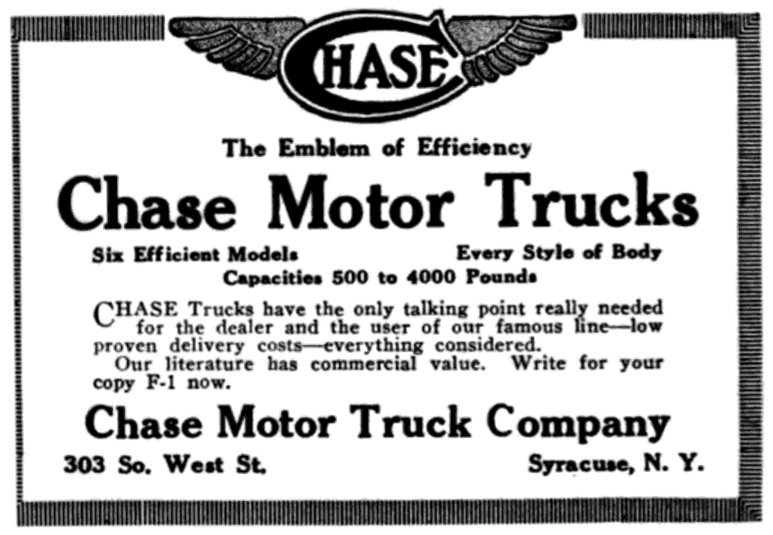
June 26, 1913

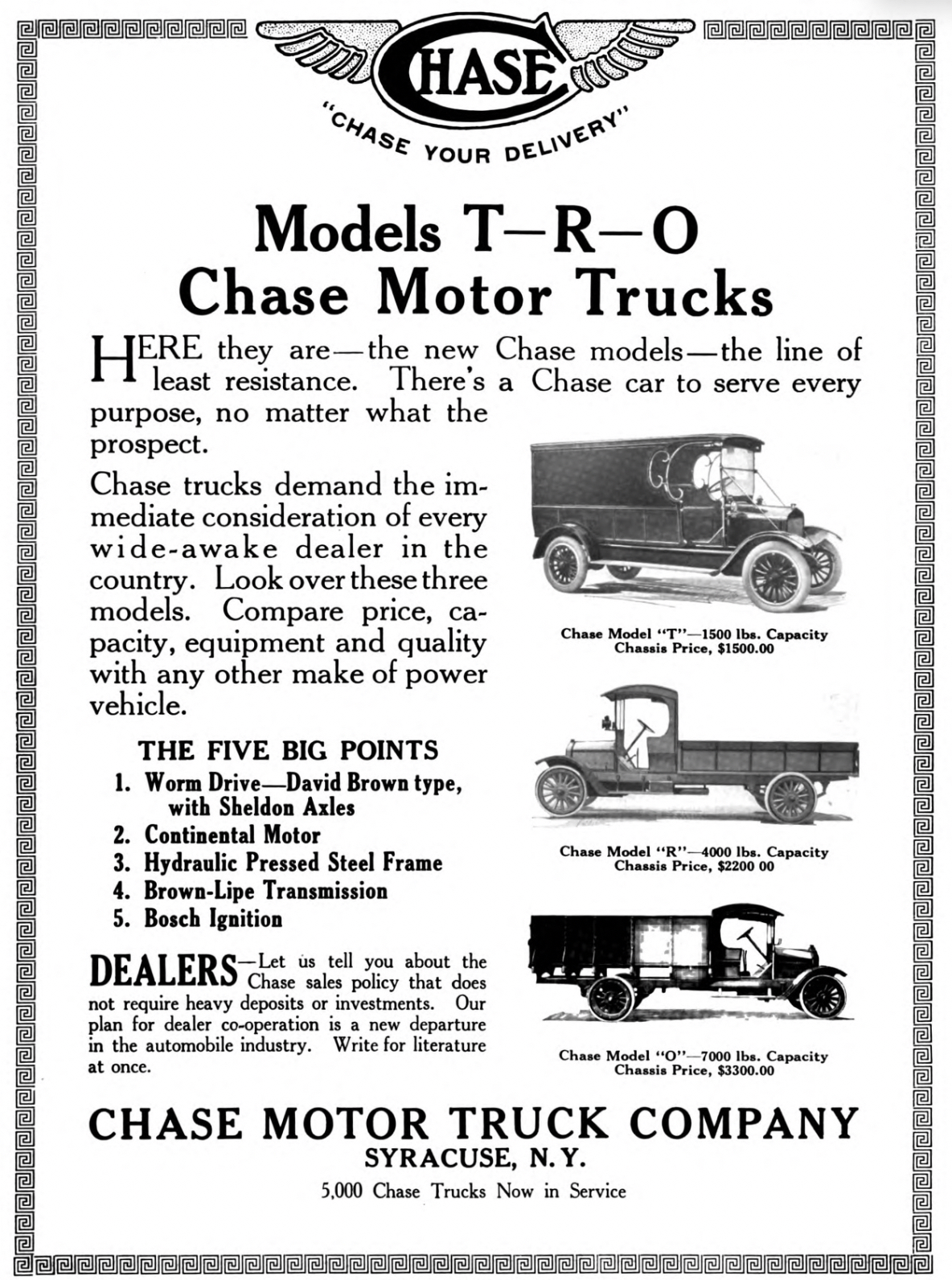
1915
