= Chased (film) =

- Directed by: Louis Taylor; Charlie Gracie
- Written by: Daniel Attrill; Louis Taylor
- Produced by: Louis Taylor; Daniel Attrill; Charlie Gracie; Connor Boundy
- Starring: Louis Taylor; Connor Boundy
- Release date: 21 March 2011
- Running time: 3 minutes
- Country: United Kingdom
- Language: English

Chased is a fast-paced drama short film made by Louis Taylor, Daniel Attrill, Charlie Gracie and Connor Boundy. It entered the Film Nation Shorts competition under the Determination and Courage categories. It then went on to win the Film Of The Month for April 2011.

== Plot ==
Jimmy has been after Sam for some time now. But what is he after? What does he want from him? When the two meet unexpectedly it is only a matter of time before the consequences become known. With a high velocity chase Jimmy hunts down Sam to the point of desperation until our final conclusion.

== Cast ==
- Louis Taylor as Jimmy
- Connor Boundy as Sam
- Daniel Attrill as Walker

== Production ==
The film was filmed in Essex in an urban location, as well as a bridge and a forest.

== Release ==
The film was put on the Film Nation's website so the public can view it. Also the directors cut was released on YouTube.

== Reception ==
The film won film of the month for April 2011. It has been shortlisted for the Film Nation Shorts Awards, and will be shown on the big screens around the country.
