= Harewood, British Columbia =

Lake and plain in British Columbia, Canada

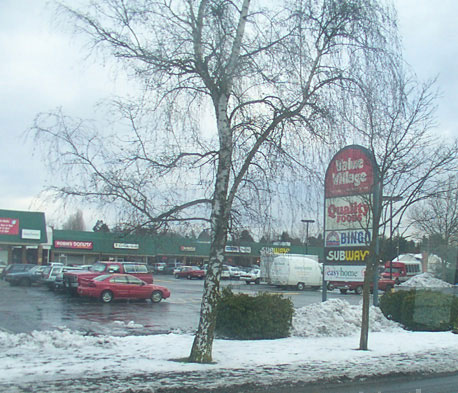
Harewood Mall, December, 2003

Harewood is the name of a lake and a plain of the Canadian province of British Columbia. It is located in Nanaimo, on the east coast of Vancouver Island. Its geographical coordinates are 49°08′N 123°57′W The name has been in use since at least 1913, when Harewood referred to a small mining village in the area, no longer existing, having been overtaken by Nanaimo. The mine was owned in part by the seventh son of Henry Lascelles, 3rd Earl of Harewood who served on the BC coast as captain of the gunboat HMS Forward and set up the Harewood Coal Mining Company to work deposits he acquired.

Today, the name "Harewood" is used to refer to a neighbourhood in south Nanaimo and surrounding community.

Community services such as schools and fire departments used to use "Harewood" in their names before broadly amalgamating with the City of Nanaimo.

The Harewood area also encompasses the site of the Nanaimo Armoury, Vancouver Island University, Headquarters of Nanaimo Search and Rescue and the Colliery Dams walking trails.

"Harewood" also used as a street name and as a name for some other community amenities.

== History ==
Coal mining played a central role in the early development of the Harewood area. The Harewood Coal Mining Company was established in 1864 to explore coal deposits south of Nanaimo near the Chase River Valley. Early attempts at mining faced financial challenges and the original company ceased operations by 1869.

Later mining operations continued in the area. The Harewood Mine opened in the 1870s and operated intermittently into the early twentieth century, producing significant quantities of coal during several phases of activity.

== Agricultural settlement and planned community ==
In 1884, Samuel Robins, superintendent of the Vancouver Coal Mining and Land Company, purchased the Harewood Estates and subdivided the land into five-acre homestead lots intended for coal miners and their families.

These small agricultural holdings formed one of the earliest planned rural communities in the Nanaimo area, allowing miners to supplement their income with farming while working in the nearby mines. Remnants of these early acreages and farmhouses remained visible into the twentieth century.

== Amalgamation with Nanaimo ==
For much of the mid-twentieth century the Harewood area existed outside the municipal boundaries of the City of Nanaimo and was governed locally through the Harewood Improvement District, which was established in the late 1940s to provide services such as fire protection, water distribution, street lighting, and parks for residents of the area.

As Nanaimo expanded after the Second World War, surrounding communities became increasingly integrated with the city’s economy and infrastructure. In 1975, the Province of British Columbia reorganized local governance in the Nanaimo area, dissolving several improvement districts and expanding Nanaimo’s municipal boundaries. On January 1, 1975, Harewood and a number of other surrounding communities were formally amalgamated into the City of Nanaimo.

The dissolution of the Harewood Improvement District ended local independent administration of services in the area, which thereafter became the responsibility of the City of Nanaimo.

== Harewood School ==
Until 2016, the original Harewood School stood in Harewood at 505 Howard Street. Built in 1914, the school was closed in 2004. Until its demolition, it was Nanaimo's oldest school still standing. It was registered of historical value, but fell into disrepair from lack of use.

The school was torn down in the spring of 2016. All that remains is the detached gymnasium.
