= Chase Building =

In the United States, Chase Building may refer to:

== Chase Center ==
- Chase Center, San Francisco, California
- Chase Center (Dallas), Texas (now Comerica Bank Tower)
- Chase Center on the Riverfront, Wilmington, Delaware

== Chase Tower ==
- Chase Tower (Amarillo), Texas (now FirstBank Southwest Tower)
- Chase Tower (Chicago), Illinois
- Chase Tower (Columbus, Ohio)
- Chase Tower (Dallas), Texas
- Chase Tower (Detroit), Michigan (now The Qube)
- Chase Tower (El Paso), Texas (now One San Jacinto Plaza)
- Chase Tower (Indianapolis, Indiana) (now Salesforce Tower)
- Chase Tower (Milwaukee), Wisconsin
- Chase Tower (Oklahoma City), Oklahoma (now BancFirst Tower)
- Chase Tower (Phoenix), Arizona
- Chase Tower (Rochester, New York) (now The Metropolitan)
- Chase Tower (Tucson), more commonly known as the Valley National Bank Building (Tucson, Arizona)

== JPMorganChase Center ==
- JPMorganChase Center, Seattle, Washington

== JPMorgan Chase Building ==
- JPMorgan Chase Building (Columbus), Ohio, known as the McCoy Center
- JPMorgan Chase Building (Houston), Texas
- JPMorgan Chase Building (New York City), New York, located at 270 Park Avenue
- JPMorgan Chase Building (San Francisco), California

== JPMorgan Chase Tower ==
- JPMorgan Chase Tower (Houston), Texas

== See also ==
- One Chase Manhattan Plaza
- Chase Manhattan Bank Building
- Chase Field
