= Chase Langford =

Michigan artist

- Born: 1960 (age 65–66); Pontiac, Michigan
- Education: University of California, Santa Barbara
- Known for: Contemporary paintings
- Website: chaselangford.com

Chase Langford (born 1960, Pontiac, Michigan) is a Los Angeles–based American contemporary painter known for his paintings, inspired by geography and maps.

== Education ==
Langford's painting practice emerges from a lifelong fascination with the endlessly varied forms of the natural world. This fascination began during childhood, and grew rapidly; by his teens, Langford had gathered a personal collection of over 1000 atlases and maps. His cartographic impulse quickly carried over to his studies at the University of California, Santa Barbara (UCSB) where he studied geography and cartography., and later to a job creating maps for faculty at UCLA. His artistic training was supplemented with his time with the Berkeley Art Cooperative, working in ceramics, as well as life drawing at the Brentwood Art Center in Los Angeles, California.

== Career ==
After graduation he started working with the Geography department of UCLA as their staff cartographer. Using his cartographic expertise he took geographic forms and filled the shapes in with colorful and expressive brushwork. These “map-paintings” were featured in the book ‘The Map as Art, Contemporary Artists Explore Cartography’. Langford gradually departed from using exact cartographic representation to fully abstract and expressionist works aided by his skills in life drawing and ceramics. Langford started to sell his painting in his home and studio at invite only events. In 2011 he was contacted by San Diego–based artist Amber George who invited him to take part in a group show she was curating at Susan Eley Fine Art. In 2014, Langford held his own solo show at Susan Eley Fine Art.

== Work ==
Langford's work stacks brightly contrasting pigments, which recall sedimentary cross-sections as much as they do aerial views of rivers, valleys, and rock formations. Langford begins his canvases with impulsive mark-making, a technique that forms and gentles to a refinement of aesthetic in abstract, layered shapes. His pieces are primarily oil paintings on canvas or wood panel, but also has some work on paper. Some include metallic paints containing bronze or aluminum.

== Collections ==
Langford's work is in the collection of a few celebrities, hotels and museums, including:

- Magic Johnson
- The Saudi Royal Family
- Paris Hotel Las Vegas
- Caesars Palace Hotel Las Vegas
- The Michael & Susan Dell Foundation, Austin, Texas
- Monique Lhuillier
- Pete Sampras
- Four Seasons in Hong Kong
- Park Hyatt Aviara
- The Long Beach Museum of Art
- Nordstrom Stores

== Galleries ==
Langford's work has been exhibited in many galleries, including:

- Eisenhauer Gallery, Edgartown, Massachusetts
- Foster/White Gallery in Seattle, Washington
- Susan Eley Fine Art, New York City
- Elder Gallery of Contemporary Art, Charlotte, North Carolina
- Coagula Curatorial, Los Angeles, California
- Kirkland Art Center, Kirkland, Washington

== Publications ==
His work has been featured in Metropolitan Home, and Huffington Post and Beverly Hills Lifestyle Magazine.
