= Chase Young (disambiguation) =

Chase Young (born 1999) is an American football player

Chase Young may also refer to:

- Chase Young (cricketer) (born 1988), South African cricket player
- Chase Young (Xiaolin Showdown), character on the television series Xiaolin Showdown
