= Chase Wright =

Chase Wright may refer to:

- Chase Wright (baseball) (born 1983), American baseball player
- Chase Wright (golfer) (born 1989), American golfer
- Chase Wright Vanek (born 1996), American actress
