= The Camelots (doo wop group) =

The Camelots were a New York City doo wop group of the 1960s led by Davie Nichols.

In 1981, The Camelots reformed with Mike Regan (lead, first and second tenor), Milton Pratt (lead and second tenor), Ernest Burnside (lead and first tenor), Joe Pitts (lead, second tenor and baritone) and Julius Williams (lead and bass).

Williams and Pratt were original members of the 1960s Camelots. Pitts and Burnside were with The Paragons on Musictone Records. Mike was an original member of the El Rays, another Coney Island group who shared billing with The Camelots at many venues. In 1982, the Camelots recorded an EP for Clifton Records. Performing often over the next two years they eventually disbanded in 1984.
