= Chase, Wisconsin =

- Town
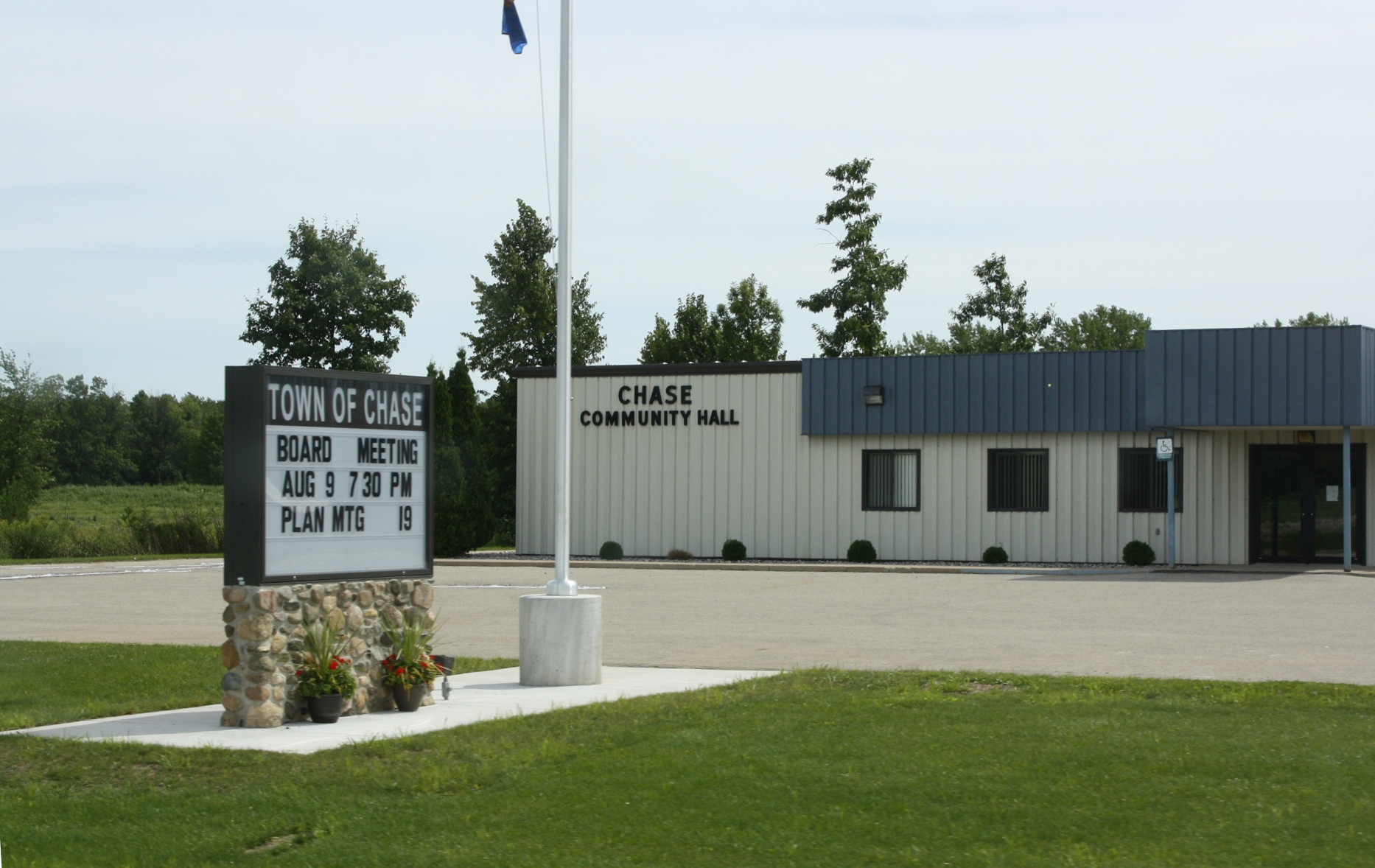
- Town hall
- Motto: "Home of the Chase Stone Barn"
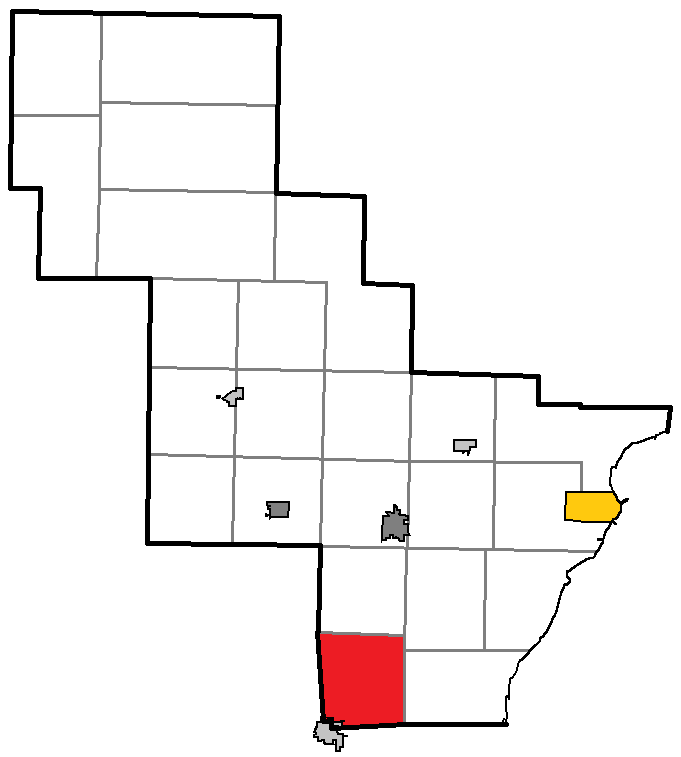
- Location of Chase, within Oconto County
- Coordinates: 44°42′25″N 88°11′17″W
- Country: United States
- State: Wisconsin
- County: Oconto

Area
  - Total: 35.2 sq mi (91.1 km^{2})
  - Land: 35.1 sq mi (91.0 km^{2})
  - Water: 0.039 sq mi (0.1 km^{2})
- Elevation: 771 ft (235 m)

Population (2020)
  - Total: 3,178
  - Density: 90.5/sq mi (34.9/km^{2})
- Time zone: UTC-6 (Central (CST))
  - Summer (DST): UTC-5 (CDT)
- FIPS code: 55-14125
- GNIS feature ID: 1582946
- Website: Welcome to the Town of Chase, Oconto County, Wisconsin

Chase is a town in Oconto County, Wisconsin, United States. The population was 3,178 at the time of the 2020 census.

The unincorporated communities of Chase and South Chase are located in the town. The unincorporated community of Krakow is also located partially in the town. The town of Chase did have a post office that was established in 1890, until it was discontinued in 1907. The town was established in 1873 as St. Nathans and was changed to Chase in 1890.

The Hillbert Settlement along Highway C was located in the town. Although the settlement was never an officially named place, it does show up on public documents. The settlement once had a cheese factory, multiple churches, and a cemetery. The only church that remains today is the Catholic Church. The settlement now is a small area along Highway C.

== Geography ==
According to the United States Census Bureau, the town has a total area of 35.2 square miles (91.1 km^{2}), of which 35.1 square miles (91.0 km^{2}) is land and 0.04 square mile (0.1 km^{2}) (0.09%) is water.

== Demographics ==
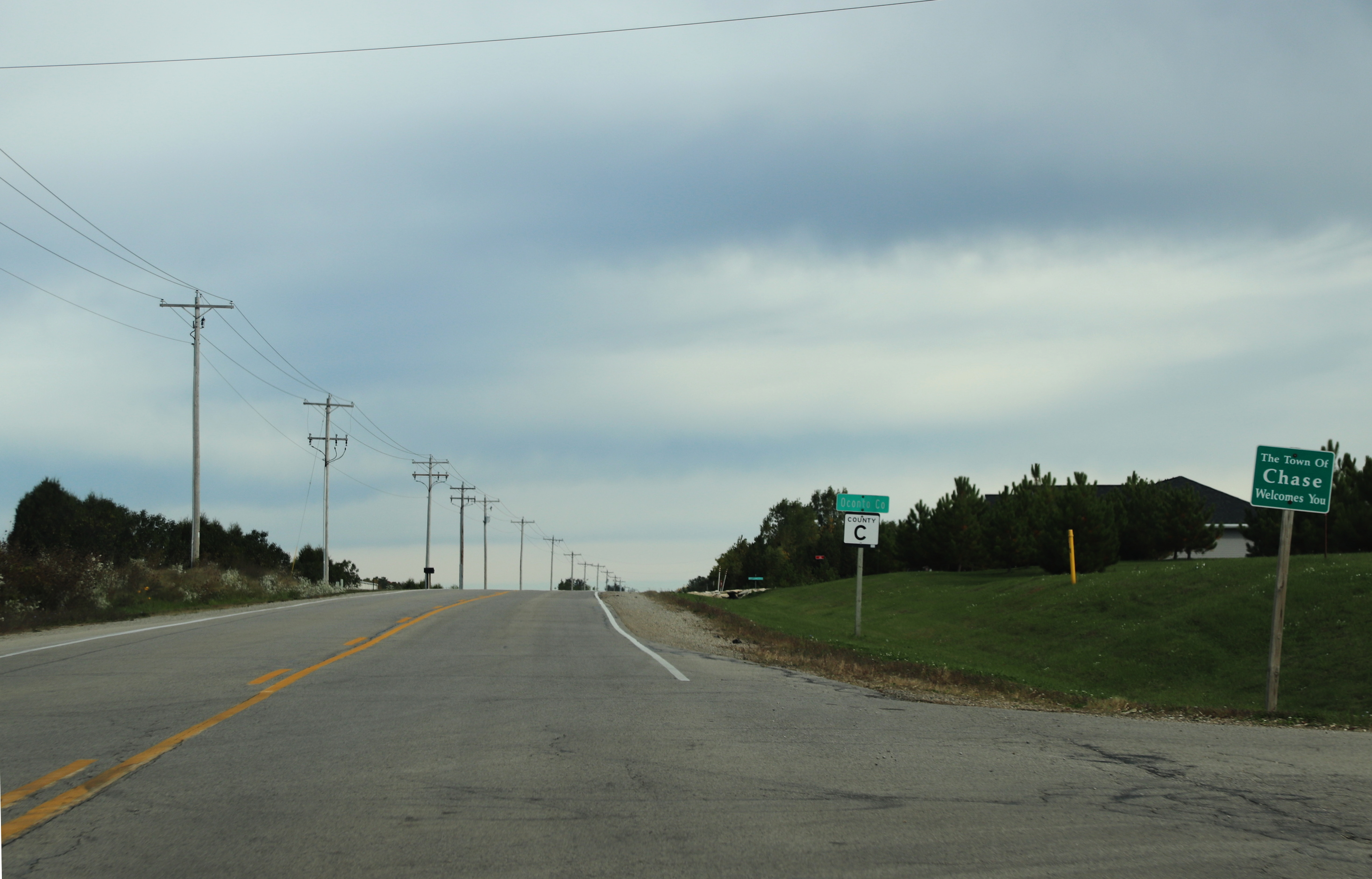
Sign for Chase on County C

As of the census of 2000, there were 2,082 people, 683 households, and 570 families residing in the town. The population density was 59.3 people per square mile (22.9/km^{2}). There were 696 housing units at an average density of 19.8 per square mile (7.6/km^{2}). The racial makeup of the town was 98.37% White, 1.01% Native American, 0.19% Asian, 0.05% from other races, and 0.38% from two or more races. Hispanic or Latino of any race were 0.53% of the population.

There were 683 households, out of which 48.6% had children under the age of 18 living with them, 74.5% were married couples living together, 4.7% had a female householder with no husband present, and 16.5% were non-families. 11.7% of all households were made up of individuals, and 5.0% had someone living alone who was 65 years of age or older. The average household size was 3.05 and the average family size was 3.34.

In the town, the population was spread out, with 33.4% under the age of 18, 5.5% from 18 to 24, 35.1% from 25 to 44, 18.9% from 45 to 64, and 7.1% who were 65 years of age or older. The median age was 33 years. For every 100 females, there were 107.0 males. For every 100 females age 18 and over, there were 107.5 males.

The median income for a household in the town was $55,385, and the median income for a family was $58,804. Males had a median income of $39,243 versus $24,667 for females. The per capita income for the town was $18,219. About 3.6% of families and 4.9% of the population were below the poverty line, including 5.8% of those under age 18 and 5.2% of those age 65 or over.

== Notable places ==
=== Chase Stone Barn ===
- The Daniel E. Krause Stone Barn, also known as the Chase Stone Barn, is listed on the National Register of Historic Places. It was designed by farmer Daniel E. Krause and built by stonemason William Mensenkamp, and is renowned for its historical significance.
