= Chase Lyons =

American baseball player

- Pitcher
- Born: December 1866; Columbus, Ohio, U.S.
- Died: Unknown

Negro league baseball debut
- 1902, for the Chicago Columbia Giants

Last appearance
- 1902, for the Chicago Columbia Giants

Teams
- Chicago Columbia Giants (1902)

Chase Lyons (December 1866 – death date unknown) was an American Negro league pitcher in the 1900s.

A native of Columbus, Ohio, Lyons played for the Chicago Columbia Giants in 1902.
