= Chase Sanborn =

Canadian jazz trumpet player

- Born: September 3, 1956 (age 69); New York City, New York, USA
- Origin: Canada
- Genres: Jazz
- Occupation: Instrumentalist
- Instrument: Trumpet
- Website: www.chasesanborn.com

Chase Sanborn (born September 3, 1956) is a well-known Canadian jazz trumpet player and veteran studio musician based in Toronto, Ontario. Originally from New York, Sanborn is an alumnus of the Berklee College of Music and a former member of the Ray Charles Orchestra. Stylistically, Sanborn draws from the traditions of Clifford Brown and Chet Baker.

As a jazz educator, Chase Sanborn's instructional books Jazz Tactics and Brass Tactics cover jazz improvisation and brass playing. His latest project, the Jazz Tactics DVD takes viewers on a guided tour of the world of jazz improvisation.

Sanborn is a member of the jazz faculty at the University of Toronto, a long-time columnist for Canadian Musician Magazine, and a contributor to a variety of music-related publications.
