= Chase River, Nanaimo =

Neighbourhood in British Columbia, Canada

Coordinates: 49°08′00″N 123°55′00″W

Chase River is a neighbourhood in the south end of the city of Nanaimo, British Columbia, Canada, on the east coast of Vancouver Island. It is named for the Chase River which runs through the community.

From 1914 it was named just "Chase" until the name was changed to Chase River in 1951. The post office at this location was named Chase River from its establishment in 1910 until it was closed in 1924.

Chase River is located at the south end of the Nanaimo Harbour at the edge of the Nanaimo River estuary.

== See also ==
- List of communities in British Columbia
