= Chase Brook =

Chase Brook may refer to:

- Chase Brook (Minnesota)
- Chase Brook (West Branch Delaware River), in New York
