= Chase Allen =

Chase Allen may refer to:

- Chase Allen (linebacker) (born 1993), American football linebacker
- Chase Allen (tight end) (born 1997), American football tight end
