= Chase (dog) =

American baseball mascot (2000–2013)

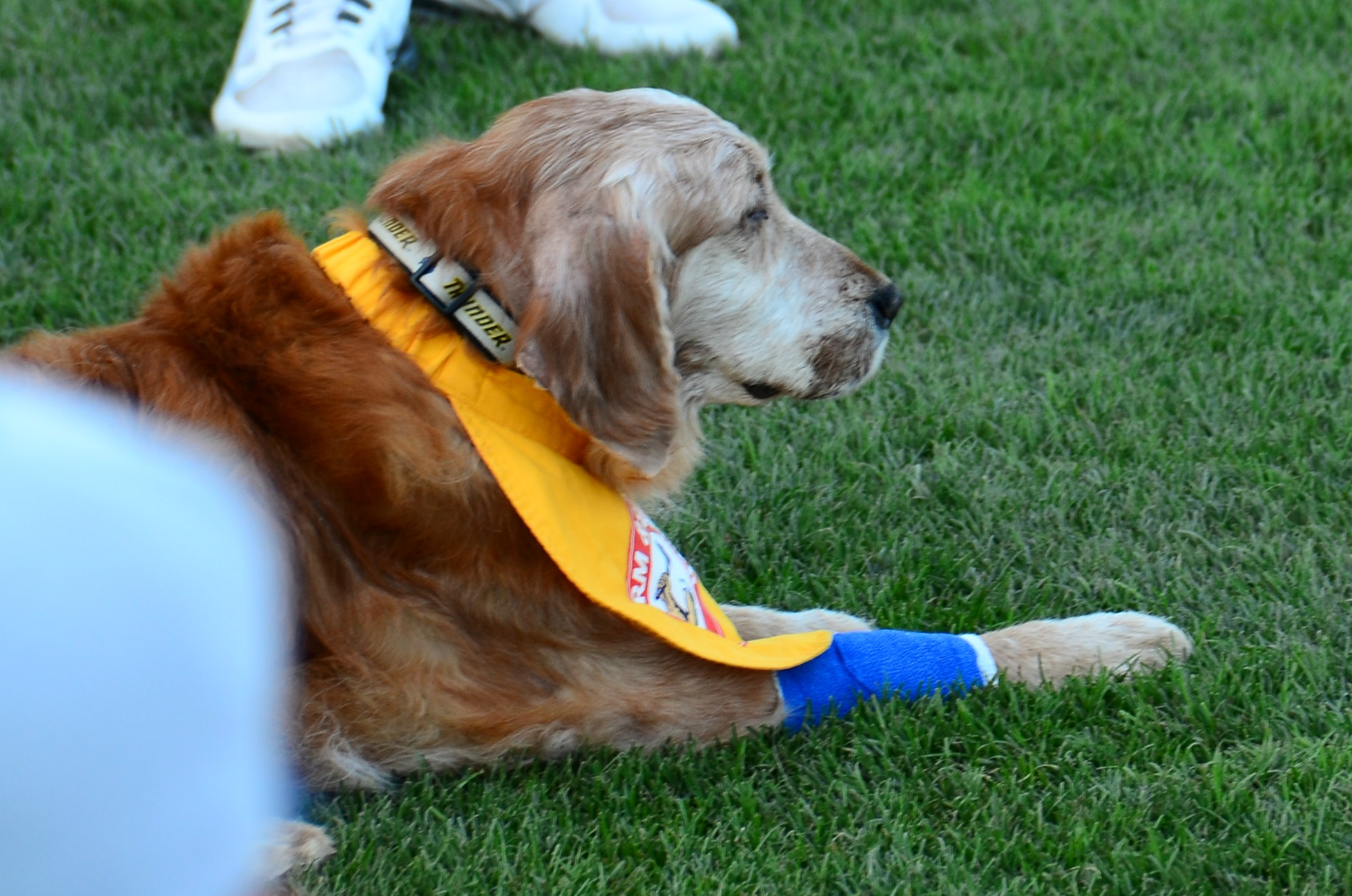
- Chase at his retirement ceremony on July 5, 2013, three days before he died
- Species: Canis lupus familiaris
- Breed: Golden Retriever
- Sex: Male
- Born: 2000
- Died: July 8, 2013 (aged 12–13)
- Years active: 2000-2013
- Offspring: Derby, Rookie, Ollie

Chase "That Golden Thunder" (2000 – July 8, 2013) was a Golden Retriever who served as "bat dog" and mascot for the Trenton Thunder minor league baseball team.

== Life ==
Chase served as "bat dog" during the first inning at most Trenton Thunder home games, retrieving bats and balls and returning them to the Thunder dugout. Contrary to popular belief, his teeth did not leave marks in the equipment, as retrievers are trained to carry birds without puncturing them. Later in the game, Chase usually caught frisbees to win a cash prize for a lucky fan. He also carried balls and waters to the umpires during the game. He did, however, have a golden tooth due to his bat carrying duties. Chase had garnered significant media attention, appearing on FOX, CNN, YES Network, UPN9, WNBC4, and even Japanese television.

In 2008, Chase sired a litter of puppies. One of the puppies was trained to be his successor and was named Home Run Derby (or Derby for short) in a fan poll during the offseason. Another of the puppies from that litter was named Ollie, who served in a bat dog capacity for the New Hampshire Fisher Cats. Derby sired puppies in 2013, with one of them, named "Rookie", being trained to eventually succeed him as a third-generation bat dog.

On June 4, 2013, Chase was honored at Yankee Stadium by special invitation of New York Yankees General Manager Brian Cashman. He was the first canine to be so honored.

On July 5, 2013, Chase had a retirement party thrown by the Thunder, complete with a video tribute. The first 2,000 fans received Chase bobbleheads and fans were encouraged to bring their own dogs to the game.

On August 11, 2015, Chase's son Derby "narrated" an ESPN E:60 feature on the Chase and his family of bat-retrieving dogs.

== Death ==
Chase passed away on July 8, 2013. He was diagnosed with lymphoma in February and had been suffering from arthritis.

== See also ==
- Ripken (dog)
- List of individual dogs
