= Mary Peckham =

American author and reformer

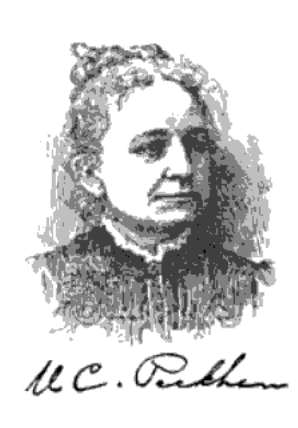
Mary Chace Peckham in The National Cyclopaedia of American Biography (1899)

Mary Chace Peckham (or Chase; 1839–1893) was an American author and reformer.

Born at Nantucket on July 15, 1839, she was the daughter of Charles Miller Peck and Adriana (Fisher) Peck. She attended high school in Providence, graduating with high honors and selected as the poet of the alumni association. She was a teacher in that city from 1857 until 1865. While in Providence, she worked with women in the state's prisons and, during the Civil War, ministered to soldiers in nearby hospitals.

On June 13, 1865, she married Stephen F. Peckham, a chemical engineer, and accompanied him to Southern California. On their return to Providence in 1866, she engaged in literary work, and in 1873, on moving to Minneapolis, devoted herself to philanthropy. She returned to Providence in 1880 and became active in the Rhode Island Woman Suffrage Association, serving on the executive committee and speaking on behalf of the group. In this role, she worked with Julia Ward Howe, Lucy Stone and Susan B. Anthony. She was also an active member of the Association for the Advancement of Women.

She wrote prose and poetry, and contributed to the religious, educational and secular press for twenty-five years. Two volumes of her work were published, the second a volume of poems collected after her death.

She died at Ann Arbor, Michigan, on March 20, 1892.

== Works ==
- Father Gabriel's Fairy (1873)
- Windfalls Gathered Only for Friends (1894)
