= The Camelots (rock band) =

The Camelots was a 1960s rock band led by Mike Appel. Their best known singles were "The Chase", written by M. Appel and J. Borrie, and "Thirsty", written by Appel, Borrie, Booton & Mestrandrea.
