= The Chicago 8 =

2011 American drama film

- Directed by: Pinchas Perry
- Written by: Pinchas Perry
- Produced by: Pinchas Perry; Al Bravo; Kate Connor; Alain Jakubowicz; James Mathers
- Starring: Philip Baker Hall; Gary Cole; Steven Culp; Mayim Bialik; Danny Masterson
- Cinematography: James Mathers
- Edited by: Richard Halsey; Colleen Halsey
- Music by: Peter Bateman; Shay Raviv
- Release date: 4 June 2011
- Running time: 88 minutes
- Country: United States
- Language: English

The Chicago 8 is a 2011 American drama film written and directed by Pinchas Perry and starring Philip Baker Hall, Gary Cole, Steven Culp and Mayim Bialik. The film is based on actual court transcripts from the Chicago Seven trial.

== Plot ==
The Chicago 8 is a courtroom drama based on actual court transcripts from the trial that resulted when seven young leaders of the Vietnam anti-war movement including Abbie Hoffman, Jerry Rubin, David Dellinger, Rennie Davis, and Tom Hayden and Black Panther Party Chairman Bobby Seale were charged with conspiracy to incite a riot.

== Cast ==
- Gary Cole as William "Bill" Kunstler
- Steven Culp as Tom Foran
- Philip Baker Hall as Judge Julius J. Hoffman
- David Julian Hirsh as Tom Hayden
- Orlando Jones as Bobby Seale
- Peter Mackenzie as David Dellinger
- Danny Masterson as Jerry Rubin
- Thomas Ian Nicholas as Abbie Hoffman
- Bret Harrison as Rennie Davis
- Aaron Abrams as Lee Weiner
- Mayim Bialik as Nancy Kurshan
- Scott Lowell as Richard Schultz
- Lauren Glazier as Anita Hoffman (née Kushner)
- Wade Williams as Allen Ginsberg
- Steven Schub as Phil Ochs
- Jim Klock as Veteran Spectator

== Production ==
Pinchas Perry, Al Bravo, Shirly Brener, Kate Connor, Alain Jakubowicz, and James Mathers all serve as producers. The film is edited by Colleen Halsey and Richard Halsey with James Mathers serving as cinematographer.

== Critical response ==
Jason Bailey, writing for The New York Times, describes the film as "a bizarre oddity that tackles this historical event with the tools and aesthetics of a low-budget direct-to-video erotic thriller," noting that "Perry, who wrote and directed, follows his predecessors by lifting snatches of dialogue from the court transcripts, but shows little understanding of the rhetoric or events, and its slender 90-minute running time is padded with inexplicable sidebars: sequestered jurors arguing over entertainment options, a tender scene between villainous Judge Hoffman and his concerned wife, and, God help us, an Abbie Hoffman orgy scene."

== Accolades ==
The film received the Audience Choice Award for Best Feature Film at the 2011 Beverly Hills Film Festival.

== See also ==
- Conspiracy: The Trial of the Chicago 8 (1987 film)
- Steal This Movie! (2000 film)
- Chicago 10 (2007 film)
- William Kunstler: Disturbing the Universe (2009 documentary)
- The Trial of the Chicago 7 (2020 film)
