= Conspiracy: The Trial of the Chicago 8 =

1987 American trial drama film

- Promotional poster
- Genre: Drama
- Written by: Jeremy Kagan
- Directed by: Jeremy Kagan
- Starring: Peter Boyle; Robert Carradine; Elliott Gould
- Music by: Arthur B. Rubinstein
- Country of origin: United States
- Original language: English

Production
- Executive producer: Ron Sossi
- Producers: Jeremy Kagan; Max A. Keller; Micheline Keller
- Cinematography: Frederick Elmes
- Editor: Michael Jablow
- Running time: 118 minutes
- Production company: HBO Showcase

Original release
- Network: HBO
- Release: May 16, 1987

Conspiracy: The Trial of the Chicago 8 is a 1987 HBO original courtroom drama made for television and directed, written and produced by Jeremy Kagan. The film tells the story of the 1969-70 trial of the Chicago Eight (later known as the Chicago Seven), and is adapted from the trial transcripts and a play The Chicago Conspiracy Trial by Ron Sossi and Frank Condon.

Jason Bailey wrote for The New York Times that "the attorneys, defendants and judge address the camera as if it were the jury; all of the dialogue is drawn from the original transcripts and, aside from superimposed flashes of archival footage and brief interview snippets from the real participants, all of the action is confined to the courtroom."

== Cast ==
- Brian Benben as Tom Hayden
- Peter Boyle as David Dellinger
- Robert Carradine as Rennie Davis
- Robert Fieldsteel as Lee Weiner
- David Kagen as John Froines
- Michael Lembeck as Abbie Hoffman
- Carl Lumbly as Bobby Seale
- Barry Miller as Jerry Rubin
- Elliott Gould as Leonard Weinglass
- Robert Loggia as William Kunstler
- David Clennon as Richard Schultz
- Harris Yulin as Tom Foran
- David Opatoshu as Judge Julius Hoffman
- Martin Sheen as James Marion Hunt
- Ron Rifkin as Allen Ginsberg
- Billy Zane as Police Officer

== Production ==
The docudrama was written, produced and directed by Jeremy Kagan for Inter Planetary Productions. Kagan wrote the script in 1979, and hoped to make the film in 1979; CBS commissioned a script but ultimately declined to make the film - the language of the defendants in court was unacceptable to the network, and Kagan said he believed the political issues also made the CBS executives nervous. The Los Angeles Times reports that Kagan, "his voice etched with emotion," recalled "[i]n 1976 I had Marlon Brando, Walter Matthau, George C. Scott and Dustin Hoffman committed to working on the project for scale and CBS turned it down. They thought the material was too controversial and nobody cared about the ‘60s." Bridget Potter, senior vice president for original programming at HBO, persuaded Kagan to revive the film, and said she was excited by Kagan's idea of integrating interviews and documentary footage into the dramatization of the trial.

All eight of the original defendants, along with defense attorneys William Kunstler and Leonard Weinglass, were interviewed for the film and the defendants were also on the set for part of the filming. "The film brought back very clear, vivid memories," Bobby Seale told The New York Times. "It reminded me that we captured the imagination of America. The 60's protest movement established a lot of constitutional rights."

== Critical response ==
In a review for Chicago Tribune, Clifford Terry wrote, "director-writer-producer Jeremy Kagan does a commendable job capturing in capsule form the feel of the trial of the eight men," and "[a]long with the skillful cast that includes Peter Boyle as David Dellinger, Robert Carradine as Rennie Davis and Barry Miller as Jerry Rubin (only Elliott Gould as attorney Leonard Weinglass seems jarringly miscast), the two-hour production also blends in contemporary interviews with the real-life participants and film footage taken during that summer storm in Grant and Lincoln parks: the tear-gassing and head-bashing, the excrement-throwing and Ginsberg-chanting, the undercover "pigs" and underground reporters. Right on." Lewis Beale wrote in The Chicago Tribune that "[t]he current show is more like a theatrical film than a televised courtroom drama. Although taped with as many as four cameras, it has been lighted in rich, dark tones like a motion picture. And its cast, including Elliott Gould, Peter Boyle, Robert Carradine, Robert Loggia, Carl Lumbly and Martin Sheen, is worthy of a feature production."

Jason Bailey, writing for the Critic's Notebook of The New York Times, observed "[t]he transcript's best moments feature the kind of dialogue most dramatists would die for, from the Marx Brothers-esque act of Abbie Hoffman and Rubin arriving in court in fake judge's robes to the righteous anger of Bobby Seale, furiously demanding his constitutional rights in an encounter that escalates to his stranger-than-fiction binding and gagging by U.S. marshals. Most of all, focusing on the courtroom allows “Conspiracy” to let this trial function as a miniature version of the riot itself — featuring, as it did, hidebound authority figures, youthful rabble-rousers, demands for social justice and out-of-control cops. Microcosms abound, in other words; in that trial, just as in the riot that precipitated it, the participants were acting out the entire cultural conflict of the moment."

== Accolades ==
The film was the winner of the 1988 CableACE Award for Dramatic Special.

== See also ==
- Steal This Movie! (2000 film)
- Chicago 10 (2007 film)
- William Kunstler: Disturbing the Universe (2009 documentary)
- The Chicago 8 (2011 film)
- The Trial of the Chicago 7 (2020 film)
