= Chicago Seven =

Defendants in a 1969–70 trial

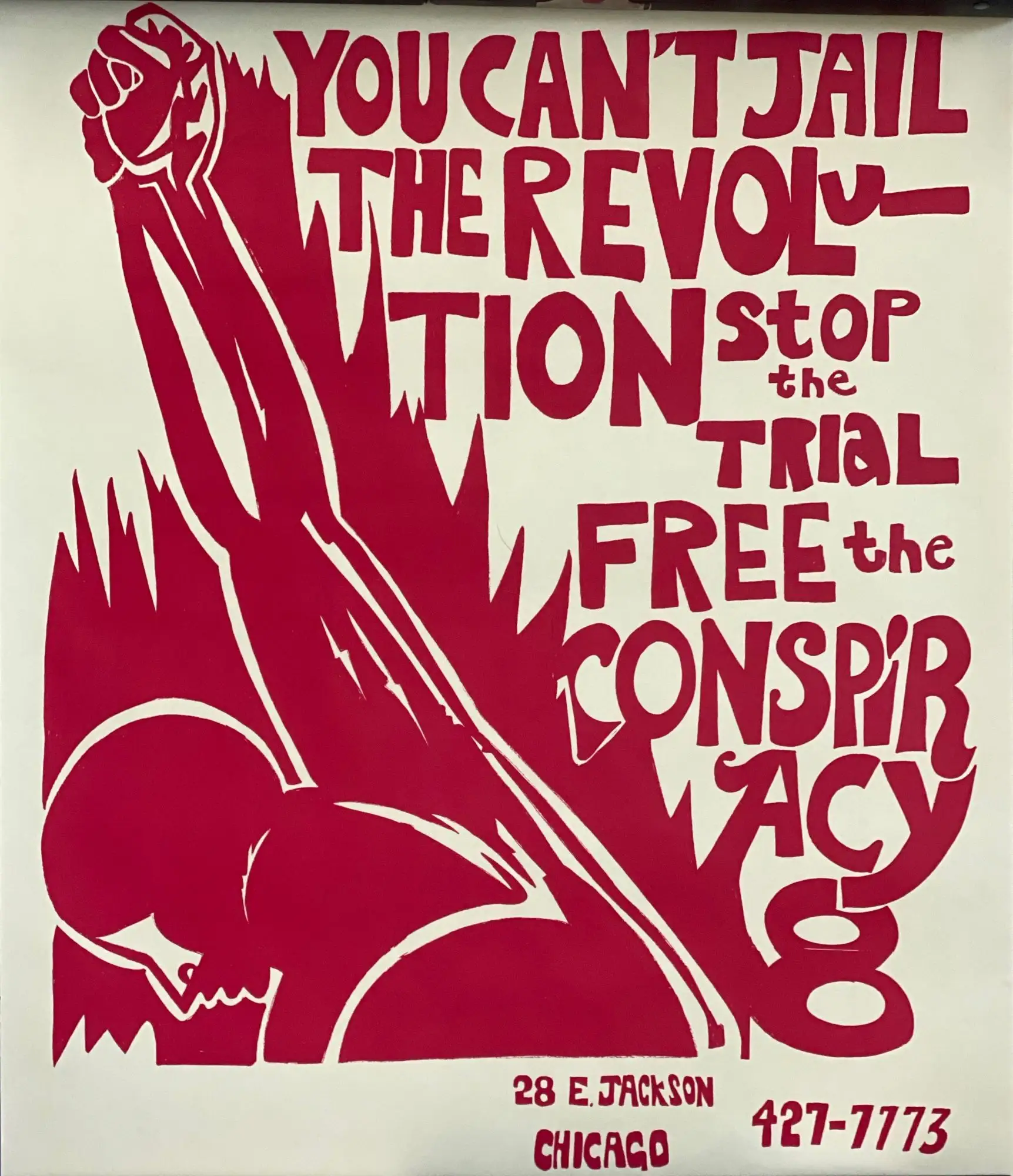
Poster in support of the "Conspiracy 8"

The Chicago Seven, originally the Chicago Eight and also known as the Conspiracy Eight or Conspiracy Seven, were seven defendants—Rennie Davis, David Dellinger, John Froines, Tom Hayden, Abbie Hoffman, Jerry Rubin, and Lee Weiner—charged by the United States Department of Justice with conspiracy, crossing state lines with intent to incite a riot, and other charges related to anti–Vietnam War and 1960s counterculture protests in Chicago, Illinois, during the 1968 Democratic National Convention. The Chicago Eight became the Chicago Seven after the case against codefendant Bobby Seale was declared a mistrial.

All of the defendants were charged with and acquitted of conspiracy; Davis, Dellinger, Hayden, Hoffman, and Rubin were charged with and convicted of crossing state lines with intent to incite a riot; Froines and Weiner were charged with teaching demonstrators how to construct incendiary devices and acquitted of those charges. All of the convictions were later reversed on appeal, and the government declined to retry the case. While the jury deliberated, Judge Julius Hoffman convicted the defendants and their attorneys of contempt of court and sentenced them to jail sentences ranging from less than three months to more than four years. The contempt convictions were also appealed, and some were retried before a different judge.

Since the beginning of the trial in 1969, the defendants and their attorneys have been depicted in a variety of art forms, including film, music, and theater.

== Background ==
=== Planning for the 1968 DNC protests ===
In the fall of 1967, David Dellinger was the director of the National Mobilization Committee to End the War in Vietnam (the Mobe). Planning began during Mobe meetings for an antiwar demonstration at the 1968 Democratic National Convention. A similar plan was created by Students for a Democratic Society Vice President Vernon T. Grizzard, titled "Summer 1968: Possibilities for New Local Organizing". In early 1968, the Tet Offensive against American forces in Vietnam started, and in February, Walter Cronkite said the war was "lost". In March, President Lyndon Johnson ended his campaign for the nomination.

Protests against the war continued, and Rennie Davis and Tom Hayden became directors of the Mobe office in Chicago. A counterculture group known as Yippies, including Jerry Rubin and Abbie Hoffman, also planned a "Festival of Life", announced at a press conference on March 17, as a response to what they described as the Democratic "Convention of Death". In January, the Yippies had issued a statement that included: "Join us in Chicago in August for an international festival of youth music and theater ... Come all you rebels, youth spirits, rock minstrels, truth seekers, peacock freaks, poets, barricade jumpers, dancers, lovers and artists ... We are there! There are 500,000 of us dancing in the streets, throbbing with amplifiers and harmony. We are making love in the parks ..." In a March meeting at Lake Villa, Illinois, coordination of demonstrations was discussed by representatives from various groups; Hayden and Davis drafted a proposal that included "the campaign should not plan violence and disruption against the Democratic National Convention. It should be nonviolent and legal."

Following the assassination of Martin Luther King Jr. in April 1968, there were riots in Chicago and other cities. In June 1968, Robert Kennedy was assassinated.

Most of the permits applied for by the Mobe and the Yippies for protest-related activities were denied. Rennie Davis sought help from the Justice Department, and argued permits would lower the risk of violence between protesters and police, but was unsuccessful. A week before the start of the convention, Mobe organizers sued in federal court to obtain permits to use the parks, but were denied on August 23.

=== The 1968 DNC protests ===
A variety of groups convened in Chicago to protest during the convention week, including the National Mobilization Committee to End the War in Vietnam (the Mobe) and the Yippies. The Black Panther Party and the Southern Christian Leadership Conference also sent representatives to protest racism.

On Friday, August 23, the Yippies nominated their own candidate for president: a 145-pound pig they called Pigasus, who according to Frank Kusch, was "released to the public" at the Civic Center Plaza and promptly "arrested" by police as he was "interviewed" by journalists. Five Yippies were taken to jail, including Jerry Rubin and Phil Ochs, while Pigasus was released to the Chicago Humane Society, and the Yippies were released after they each posted a $25 bond.

By the weekend before the convention, about 2,000 demonstrators had set up camp in Lincoln Park. On Saturday, August 24, Lincoln Park was cleared almost without incident, with Allen Ginsberg leading many protesters out of the park before the 11 p.m. curfew. According to Frank Kusch, police cleared the park and arrested eleven people for failing to disperse, while a crowd outside of the park suddenly ran toward the main street in Old Town yelling "Peace now! Peace now! Peace now!" and then marched for ten blocks before police arrived and the demonstrators quickly blended into the regular crowds on the sidewalks.

For the convention, the 11,900 members of the Chicago Police Department were put on twelve-hour shifts, and nearly 6,000 members of the National Guard were sent to the city, with an additional 5,000 National Guard on alert, and approximately 1,000 FBI and military intelligence officers, and 1,000 Secret Service agents were in the city. The 4,865 city firefighters were ordered to work extra shifts beginning on the Sunday before the convention, and the Chicago Police Department placed 1,500 uniformed officers outside the International Amphitheatre, where the Democratic convention was held, including snipers.

The number of demonstrators in Chicago was estimated to be about 10,000. From inside the International Amphitheatre, CBS evening news anchor Walter Cronkite reported: "The Democratic convention is about to begin in a police state. There just doesn't seem to be any other way to say it."

On Sunday, August 25, protest leaders allegedly told people to "test the curfew", while there were several thousand people in Lincoln Park, around bonfires, beating drums, and chanting. When the park was officially closed at 11 p.m., Chicago police used tear gas and moved in with billy clubs to forcibly remove them from the park. Police formed a skirmish line and cleared the park, ending up on Stockton Drive, with about 200 police facing about 2,000 protesters. Protesters, journalists, photographers, and bystanders were clubbed and beaten by the police.

On August 26, demonstrators gathered in Grant Park and climbed on a statue of General Logan on a horse, which led to violent skirmishes with police. Police hauled a young man down and arrested him, breaking his arm in the process. The only permit granted to the Mobe for the convention week was for a rally at the Grant Park band shell for the afternoon of August 28, and it was granted on August 27, after the convention began. David Dellinger told members of the media, "We'll march with or without a permit", and that Grant Park was only a "staging area for the march".

On the morning of August 28, Abbie Hoffman was arrested for writing the word "FUCK" on his forehead. In the afternoon, Dellinger, Seale, Davis, and Hayden addressed thousands of demonstrators at the band shell in Grant Park. After the rally at the Grant Park bandshell, several thousand protesters attempted to march to the International Amphitheatre, but were stopped in front of the Conrad Hilton Hotel, where the presidential candidates and campaigns were headquartered, by what David Taylor and Sam Morris of The Guardian describe as "a phalanx of National Guard armed with M1 rifles, backed by machine guns and jeeps with cages on top and barbed wire frames in front." In a sit down protest, the crowd chanted "the whole world is watching".

Film and videotape reports from "The Battle of Michigan Avenue", described by Neil Steinberg of the Chicago Sun-Times as "a 17-minute melee in front of the Conrad Hilton", were broadcast on television, interrupting the live coverage of the third evening of the convention. The police violence extended to protesters, bystanders, reporters and photographers, while tear gas reached Hubert Humphrey in his hotel suite. Police pushed protesters through plate-glass windows, then pursued them inside and beat them as they sprawled on the broken glass. 100 protesters and 119 police officers were treated for injuries, and 600 protesters were arrested. Police brutality and demonstrators chanting "The whole world is watching" were filmed by national news outlets and broadcast on the same night that Humphrey won the presidential nomination.

Paul Cowan of The Village Voice reports that by Thursday, Tom Hayden was in disguise by Grant Park, Jerry Rubin was in jail, and Rennie Davis was recovering from a beating by the police. After a speech by Eugene McCarthy in Grant Park that afternoon, a march was joined by delegates and McCarthy supporters but was stopped at 18th Street and Michigan Avenue by the National Guard. Arrests were followed by tear gas and mace, while marchers chanted "The whole world is watching" and retreated to Grant Park. In the park, demonstrators sang "God Bless America", "This Land Is Your Land", and "The Star-Spangled Banner", and waved "V" signs above their heads, asking soldiers to join in. They never did. Phil Ochs sang "I Ain't Marchin' Any More", and demonstrators chanted "join us" softly. Five hours later, police officers raided a party organized by McCarthy workers in the Hilton hotel, and beat them viciously. According to the McCarthy workers, all telephones on their floor had been disconnected a half hour before, and they had no way to call for help.

=== Investigation of the violence ===
Investigations were conducted by the City of Chicago, the U.S. Department of Justice, the House Committee on Un-American Activities (HUAC), and the National Commission on the Causes and Prevention of Violence. On September 6, 1968, the city administration issued a report that focused on "outside agitators" with an "avowed purpose of a hostile confrontation with law enforcement."

Bruce Ragsdale writes that the HUAC chair, Richard Ichord, "suspected communist involvement in the demonstrations", but the hearings "devolved into a bizarre preview of the conspiracy trial when a shirtless, barefooted Jerry Rubin burst into the hearing room with a bandolier of bullets and a toy gun." In October 1968, Abbie Hoffman was arrested for wearing an American flag shirt while trying to attend a HUAC meeting after being subpoenaed to appear. Tom Hayden also testified during the hearings.

On September 4, 1968, Milton Eisenhower, chair of the National Commission on the Causes and Prevention of Violence, announced the commission would investigate and report its findings to President Lyndon Johnson. Supervised by Daniel Walker, more than 200 investigators conducted interviews of more than 1,400 witnesses and reviewed FBI reports and film. The Walker Report was released on December 1, 1968, and described the violence as a "police riot". The report summary included:

That some policemen lost control of themselves under exceedingly provocative circumstances can perhaps be understood; but not condoned. If no action is taken against them, the effect can only be to discourage the majority of policemen who acted responsibly, and further weaken the bond between police and community. The Walker Report also acknowledged provocation and violence by some protesters and stated the "vast majority of the demonstrators were intent on expressing by peaceful means their dissent".

The Department of Justice investigation did not support prosecution of demonstrators. Attorney General Ramsey Clark asked the U.S. attorney in Chicago to investigate the Chicago police.

== Grand jury and indictment ==
On September 9, 1968, a grand jury in the U.S. District Court for the Northern District of Illinois began to investigate demonstration organizers for federal law violations and police officers for civil rights violations. On March 20, 1969, the grand jury indictments of eight demonstrators and eight police officers were publicly announced. Seven police officers were charged with assault and one police officer was charged with perjury. In addition, Enid Roth, an NBC News producer, was indicted on two counts of electronic eavesdropping, which were related to hidden microphones found in closed meetings of the Democratic party platform committee.

The charges against the demonstrators were the first prosecutions under the anti-riot provisions of Title X of the Civil Rights Act of 1968. All were charged with conspiring to use interstate commerce with intent to incite a riot. David Dellinger, Rennie Davis, Tom Hayden, Abbie Hoffman, Jerry Rubin, and Bobby Seale were also charged with crossing state lines with the intent to incite a riot. John Froines and Lee Weiner were charged with teaching demonstrators how to construct incendiary devices that would be used in civil disturbances.

Eighteen others were named by the grand jury as alleged co-conspirators, but not indicted: Wolfe B. Lowenthal, Stewart E. Albert, Sidney M. Peck, Kathy Boudin, Corina F. Fales, Benjamin Radford, Thomas W. Neumann, Craig Shimabukuro, Bo Taylor, David A. Baker, Richard Bosciano, Terry Gross, Donna Gripe, Benjamin Ortiz, Joseph Toornabene, Sara C. Brown, Bradford Fox, and Richard Palmer.

== Trial ==
The original eight defendants were Abbie Hoffman, Jerry Rubin, David Dellinger, Tom Hayden, Rennie Davis, John Froines, Lee Weiner, and Bobby Seale. The defense attorneys were William Kunstler, Leonard Weinglass of the Center for Constitutional Rights, as well as Michael Kennedy, Michael Tigar, Charles Garry, Gerald Lefcourt, and Dennis Roberts. The presiding judge was Julius Hoffman (no relation to Abbie), and the prosecutors were Richard Schultz and Tom Foran.

=== Trial begins ===
The trial began on September 24, 1969. In his opening statement, when prosecutor Richard Schultz mentioned Abbie Hoffman, Abbie Hoffman stood up and blew the jury a kiss, and the judge said, "The jury is directed to disregard the kiss from Mr. Hoffman."

The government called 53 witnesses, including undercover police officer Robert Pierson, who worked as a bodyguard for Abbie Hoffman and Jerry Rubin, and testified that on October 8, 1969, he heard Abbie Hoffman say "If they push us out of the park tonight, we're going to break windows", and about statements made by Rubin, Seale, and Davis. Police officer William Frapolly testified about his undercover work, which included joining Students for a Democratic Society and the National Mobilization Committee. Frapolly testified he heard most of the defendants say they intended to incite police confrontations and other disturbances; he also testified that Weiner and Froines discussed incendiary devices and chemical bombs.

=== Bobby Seale ===
Seale was initially represented by Charles Garry, who appeared at the April 9 arraignment. Before the trial began, Seale had been indicted in Connecticut on charges of conspiracy to murder a suspected police informant and was therefore denied bail during the trial. Garry became unable to travel due to his need to recover from a surgery, and Judge Hoffman denied the request to postpone the trial start date. The judge also refused to allow Seale to represent himself, in part because Kunstler had signed an appearance for Seale on September 24 to be able to visit him in jail, so Kunstler's request to withdraw as Seale's attorney was an "absolutely discretionary" decision by the judge, and Judge Hoffman decided Seale was represented by Kunstler.

Seale protested the judge's actions, arguing that they were not only illegal, but also racist, telling the court on September 26, "If I am consistently denied this right of legal defense counsel of my choice, who is effective, by the judge of this court, then I can only see the judge as a blatant racist of the United States court." Seale had been in Chicago for less than 24 hours over two days of the convention week and had been invited shortly before the convention began as a substitute for Eldridge Cleaver, so the evidence against him was testimony from undercover police officer Robert Pierson, about a speech by Seale in Lincoln Park, where according to Pierson, Seale had urged his audience to "barbecue some pork", and Judge Hoffman, over the objection of the defense, allowed Pierson to give his opinion that this meant "to burn some pigs", i.e., police officers.

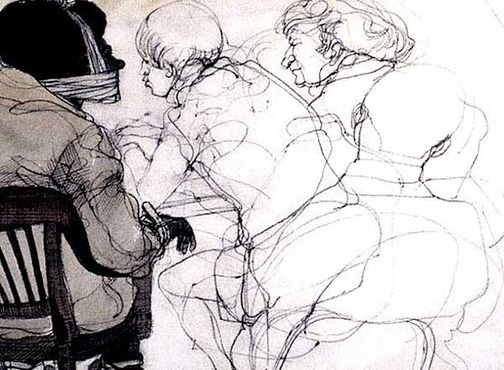
Bobby Seale as depicted by Franklin McMahon at the trial

On the morning of October 29, after Seale called Judge Hoffman a "rotten racist pig, fascist liar", the judge responded: "Let the record show the tone of Mr. Seale's voice was one of shrieking and pounding on the table and shouting", and Seale replied, "If a witness is on the stand and testifies against me and I stand up and speak out in behalf of my right to have my lawyer and to defend myself and you deny me that, I have a right to make those requests. I have a right to make those demands on my constitutional rights. I have a constitutional right to speak, and if you try to suppress my constitutional right to speak out in behalf of my constitutional rights, then I can only see you as a bigot, a racist, and a fascist, and I have said before and clearly indicated on the record."

In the afternoon session of October 29, Judge Hoffman ordered Seale to be bound, gagged, and chained to a chair. According to John Schultz, when the jury was allowed into the courtroom, juror Jean Fritz began weeping, and other jurors "squirmed hard in their seats at the sight."

On three days, Seale appeared in court bound and gagged before the jury, struggling to get free, and at times managing to loudly insist on his right to defend himself. On October 30, in open court, Kunstler declared, "This is no longer a court of order, your Honor; this is a medieval torture chamber." On November 5, the judge declared a mistrial for Seale, and the Chicago Eight became the Chicago Seven, with Seale's case severed for a later trial that never occurred.

=== A political trial ===
On October 15, when the first Moratorium to End the War in Vietnam was observed across the country, the defendants attempted to place American and South Vietnamese flags on the defense table, but Judge Hoffman demanded them removed, stating, "Whatever decoration there is the courtroom will be furnished by the government and I think things look alright in this courtroom." On November 15, the second day of the Moratorium to End the War in Vietnam, Abbie Hoffman brought a Viet Cong flag into the courtroom and then wrestled over it with deputy marshal Ronald Dobroski.

Abbie Hoffman and Rennie Davis testified at the trial. On December 29, when asked about his arrest on August 28 for writing "FUCK" on his forehead, Abbie Hoffman testified, "I put it on for a couple of reasons, one was that I was tired of seeing my picture in the paper and having newsmen come around, and I know if you got that word on your forehead they ain't going to print your picture in the paper. Secondly, it sort of summed up my attitude about the whole thing—what was going on in Chicago." When asked whether he entered into an agreement with Dellinger, Froines, Hayden, Rubin, Weiner or Davis, to come to Chicago for the purpose of encouraging and promoting violence during the Convention week, Abbie Hoffman replied, "We couldn't agree on lunch." When asked by the prosecution about whether it was "a fact that one of the reasons why you came to Chicago was simply to wreck American society", he replied:

My feeling at the time, and still is, that society is going to wreck itself. I said that on a number of occasions, that our role is to survive while the society comes tumbling down around us; our role is to survive. We have to learn how to defend ourselves, given this type of society, because of the war in Vietnam, because of racism, because of the attack on the cultural revolution—in fact because of this trial.

The trial lasted for months, with more than 100 witnesses called by the defense, including singers Phil Ochs, Judy Collins, Arlo Guthrie, and Country Joe McDonald; comedian Dick Gregory; writers Norman Mailer and Allen Ginsberg; and activists Timothy Leary and Jesse Jackson.

Ochs, who had helped to organize some of the demonstrations, told the court he had acquired the pig, called Pigasus, to nominate as the Yippie presidential candidate before being arrested with Rubin and other participants. Judy Collins attempted to sing "Where Have All the Flowers Gone?" during her testimony, before Judge Hoffman forbade it, so Collins recited the lyrics instead. The judge also forbade Ochs from singing "I Ain't Marching Any More," Guthrie from singing "Alice's Restaurant", and McDonald from singing "I-Feel-Like-I'm-Fixin-To-Die-Rag". Ginsberg recited poetry and chants, including O-o-m-m-m-m-m, while providing testimony about his participation in the demonstrations.

On January 28, 1970, Ramsey Clark, the U.S. Attorney General under President Lyndon Johnson during the 1968 Democratic Convention, was barred by the judge from testifying before the jury after Clark testified outside the presence of the jury. Judge Hoffman upheld the prosecution's objections to 14 of Kunstler's 38 questions, but Clark did testify that he had told Foran to investigate through Justice Department lawyers "as is generally done in civil rights cases", rather than through a grand jury.

On February 5, Abbie Hoffman shouted, "Your idea of justice is the only obscenity in this court, Julie", at Judge Hoffman and then yelled shande fur de goyim at him, after Rubin told the judge, "Every kid in the world hates you because they know what you represent. You are synonymous with Adolf Hitler. Adolf Hitler equals Julius Hitler." These insults had followed Judge Hoffman stating that he intended to continue using the revocation of bail in response to the use of "vile epithets" in the courtroom, while the defense attorneys were arguing against the revocation of Dellinger's bail the day before, after Dellinger shouted a "barnyard vulgarity" at a government witness.

On February 6, Abbie Hoffman and Rubin wore judicial robes to court, then threw them down and stepped on them.

On February 14, the case went to the jury, and the jury returned its verdict on February 18.

== Contempt citations ==
During the proceedings, all of the defendants and nearly all of their attorneys were cited for contempt of court by Judge Hoffman.

=== Pre-trial ===
Attorneys Michael Kennedy, Dennis Roberts, Michael Tigar, and Gerald Lefcourt assisted the defense with pretrial motions. Before the trial began, Judge Hoffman held them all in contempt after they attempted to withdraw from the case, issued bench warrants for their arrest, and had Tigar and Lefcourt jailed. After two of the warrants were invalidated by the United States District Court in San Francisco, and while the court was being picketed by protesting attorneys, Judge Hoffman permitted the withdrawal of the attorneys from the case.

=== Bobby Seale ===
On November 5, 1969, after declaring a mistrial in the prosecution of Bobby Seale, Judge Hoffman convicted Seale on 16 charges of contempt, and sentenced Seale to three months in prison on each count—a total of four years, which may have been the longest contempt sentence in U.S. history at the time.

=== Post-trial ===
On February 14 and 15, 1970, while the jury deliberated on the verdict for the remaining defendants, Judge Hoffman convicted all the defendants—and their attorneys Kunstler and Weinglass—on a total of 159 counts of criminal contempt. The sentences for the defendants and their attorneys were as follows:

- Dellinger: 29 months and 16 days on 32 counts
- Davis: 25 months and 14 days on 23 counts
- Froines: 5 months and 15 days on 10 counts
- Hayden: 14 months and 14 days for 11 counts
- Hoffman: 8 months for 24 counts
- Rubin: 25 months and 23 days for 16 counts
- Weiner: 2 months and 18 days on 7 counts
- Weinglass: 20 months and 16 days on 14 counts
- Kunstler: 48 months and 13 days on 24 counts

Six of the seven defendants remanded to jail received haircuts in the Cook County Jail; John Kifner of The New York Times reports that David Dellinger did not, and the others were "shorn of their long hair for what jail officials announced were 'sanitary reasons'", while the lawyers' sentences were stayed until May 4, to allow them to work on the appeal. After the haircuts, Cook County Sheriff Joseph I. Woods showed pictures of the defendants to an audience on February 23, 1970, that Kifner reports consisted of "about 100 laughing and applauding members of the Elk Grove Township Republican organization at a meeting in the suburban Mount Prospect Country Club."

The defendants were released from jail on February 28, 1970.

== Verdict ==
On February 18, 1970, the jury acquitted all seven defendants of conspiracy and acquitted Froines and Weiner on all charges. The jury found Davis, Dellinger, Hayden, Hoffman, and Rubin guilty of traveling across state lines with intent to incite a riot.

In a separate trial, seven of the indicted police officers were acquitted by the jury, and the case against the eighth indicted police officer was dismissed by the prosecution.

== Sentencing ==
On February 20, 1970, in the sentencing phase of the trial, the defendants made statements, including David Dellinger, who said:

[W]hatever happens to us, however unjustified, will be slight compared to what has happened already to the Vietnamese people, to the black people in this country, to the criminals with whom we are now spending our days in the Cook County jail. I must have already lived longer than the normal life expectancy of a black person born when I was born, or born now. I must have already lived longer, 20 years longer, than the normal life expectancy in the underdeveloped countries which this country is trying to profiteer from and keep under its domain and control ... [S]ending us to prison, any punishment the Government can impose upon us, will not solve the problem of this country's rampant racism, will not solve the problem of economic injustice, it will not solve the problem of the foreign policy and the attacks upon the underdeveloped people of the world. The Government has misread the times in which we live, just like there was a time when it was possible to keep young people, women, black people, Mexican-American, anti-war people, people who believe in truth and justice and really believe in democracy, which it is going to be possible to keep them quiet or suppress them.

Rennie Davis told Judge Hoffman, "You represent all that is old, ugly, bigoted, and repressive in this country, and I will tell you that the spirit of this defense table will devour your sickness in the next generation."

The statement by Tom Hayden included:

We have known all along what the intent of the Government has been. We knew that before we set foot in the streets of Chicago. We knew that before we set foot on the streets of Chicago. We knew that before the famous events of August 28, 1968. If those events didn't happen, the Government would have had to invent them as I think it did for much of its evidence in this case, but because they were bound to put us away. They have failed. Oh, they are going to get rid of us, but they made us in the first place. We would hardly be notorious characters if they had left us alone in the streets of Chicago last year, but instead we became the architects, the masterminds, and the geniuses of a conspiracy to overthrow the government. We were invented. We were chosen by the Government to serve as scape goats for all that they wanted to prevent happening in the 1970s.

The statement of Abbie Hoffman included a discussion of early American history, and:

In 1861 Abraham Lincoln in his inaugural address said, and I quote "When the people shall grow weary of their constitutional right to amend the government, they shall exert their revolutionary right to dismember and overthrow that government." If Abraham Lincoln had given that speech in Lincoln Park, he would be on trial right here in this courtroom, because that is an inciteful speech. That is a speech intended to create a riot. I don't even know what a riot is. I thought a riot was fun. Riot means you laugh, ha, ha. That is a riot. They call it a riot.

I didn't want to be that serious. I was supposed to be funny. I tried to be, I mean, but it was sad last night. I am not made to be a martyr. I tried to sign up a few years, but I went down there. They ran out of nails. What was I going to do? So I ended up being funny. It wasn't funny last night sitting in a prison cell, a 5 x 8 room, with no light in the room. I could have written a whole book last night. Nothing. No light in the room. Bedbugs all over. They bite. I haven't eaten in six days. I'm not on a hunger strike; you can call it that. It's just that the food stinks and I can't take it.

Well, we said it was like Alice in Wonderland coming in, now I feel like Alice in 1984, because I have lived through the winter of injustice in this trial. And it's fitting that if you went to the South and fought for voter registration and got arrested and beaten eleven or twelve times on those dusty roads for no bread, it's only fitting that you be arrested and tried under the civil rights act. That's the way it works.

Judge Hoffman sentenced each convicted defendant to five years in prison, as well as a $5,000 fine and costs of prosecution.

== Appeal ==
A United States Court of Appeals for the Seventh Circuit panel composed of Walter Cummings, Thomas Fairchild, and Wilbur Pell heard the appeals related to the criminal convictions and contempt convictions.

On May 11, 1972, the panel dismissed some contempt charges against the lawyers, and reversed all of the other contempt convictions for retrial with a different judge. Judge Edward Gignoux presided over the retrial and found Dellinger, Hoffman, Kunstler, and Rubin guilty of some of the charges but did not sentence any of them to jail or fines. The U.S. Court of Appeals for the Seventh Circuit dismissed four of the contempt convictions against Bobby Seale, remanded the other 12 for retrial before another judge, and the government declined to prosecute the remaining contempt charges.

On November 21, 1972, all of the criminal convictions were reversed by the panel. The majority opinion of the court unanimously found several errors by Judge Hoffman and censured Judge Hoffman and the prosecutors for their conduct during the trial. The court noted, "the demeanor of the judge and the prosecutors would require reversal even if errors did not." Pell wrote a separate opinion concurring with the reversal of the convictions, and finding Title X of the Civil Rights Act of 1968, known as the Anti-Riot Act, to be an unconstitutional infringement of freedom of speech; this was not part of the majority opinion and therefore did not invalidate the statute. The U.S. Department of Justice announced in January 1973 that it would not retry the defendants.

== Cultural representations ==
=== Art ===
- On September 25, 1969, Richard Avedon made his first wall-sized mural portrait of the Chicago Seven. It was first exhibited at the Minneapolis Institute of Art in the summer of 1970 and has since been exhibited in museums around the world. Avedon called the group of defendants "heroic". According to Froines and Weiner, an Avedon photo was used in thank you cards, holiday greetings, and fundraising requests sent to supporters.
- During the trial, a poster created by Sharon Avery and featuring a photograph by Michael Abramson, that said "make a new year's revolution, kids! it'll bring you closer together" depicting Lee Weiner and his girlfriend at the time, Sharon Avery, nude and with Christmas tree lights in their hair, was distributed "to the young people waiting out on the cold to sit in on our trial to thank them for supporting us", according to Weiner.
- Robert Crumb drew the poster for The Conspiracy Stomp, a benefit for the Chicago Eight held at the Aragon Ballroom on November 28, 1969.
- David Hammons, in 'Injustice Case', depicted an African-American man bound to a chair and gagged that "[recalls] how Black Panther leader Bobby Seale was bound and gagged in a Chicago courtroom."

=== Film ===
- In Haskell Wexler's 1969 film Medium Cool, Vincent Canby of The New York Times writes that Wexler "uses some of the real events of [1968] ... as backgrounds that are extensions of the fictional characters."
- The 1970 Kerry Feltham film Chicago 70 (also known as The Great Chicago Conspiracy Circus) was based on the stage play by the Toronto Workshop.
- In 1970, the BBC produced The Chicago Conspiracy Trial, with Ronny Cox as Jerry Rubin, Cliff Gorman as Abbie Hoffman, and Al Freeman Jr. as Bobby Seale; the re-creation of the trial was aired in the US by PBS in July 1975.
- In 1970, Jean-Luc Godard and Jean-Pierre Gorin, of the Dziga Vertov Group, made a parody film of the Chicago 8 trial called Vladimir and Rosa.
- In the 1971 Peter Watkins film Punishment Park, fictional members of the counterculture are put on trial for similar "crimes".
- In the 1971 film Bananas, Woody Allen makes a reference to the binding and gagging of Bobby Seale during the Chicago 8 trial. Allen's character, Fielding Melish, is on trial and defending himself. The judge orders Melish bound and gagged. While bound and gagged, he cross-examines a prosecution witness.
- The 1987 Jeremy Kagan made-for-HBO movie Conspiracy: The Trial of the Chicago 8 was adapted from the Ron Sossi and Frank Condon play The Chicago Conspiracy Trial, is based on the courtroom transcripts, and includes brief interviews with participants in the trial.
- The 2000 Robert Greenwald film Steal This Movie is mostly about Abbie Hoffman (played by Vincent D'Onofrio), and looks at the trial.
- In the 2007 Brett Morgen film Chicago 10, archival footage, including Chicago in August 1968, is mixed with animated scenes based on the trial transcript.
- The 2010 documentary Phil Ochs: There but for Fortune features interviews with a variety of Ochs' associates, including Tom Hayden, Jerry Rubin, and Abbie Hoffman. Stephen Holden of The New York Times writes, "Ochs's involvement with the civil rights and antiwar movements and his presence at the 1968 Democratic National Convention make "There but for Fortune" not only a biography but also a running history of the period's left-wing activism, replete with film clips of that decade's tragic events".
- The 2011 Pinchas Perry film The Chicago 8 includes dialogue from some of the trial transcripts.
- The 2020 Aaron Sorkin film The Trial of the Chicago 7 was distributed by Netflix. The cast features Sacha Baron Cohen, Daniel Flaherty, John Carroll Lynch, Eddie Redmayne, Noah Robbins, Alex Sharp, and Jeremy Strong as the Chicago Seven with Yahya Abdul-Mateen II, Joseph Gordon-Levitt, Michael Keaton, Frank Langella, and Mark Rylance in other roles.

=== Music ===
- Phil Ochs released his 1969 album Rehearsals for Retirement with an image of his own tombstone on the cover, inscribed: "Born: El Paso, Texas 1940" and "Died: Chicago, Illinois 1968", which according to Ryan Smith of Chicago Reader, is an "obvious reference" to Ochs' role in the 1968 Democratic National Convention protests; the album also includes the song "William Butler Yeats Visits Lincoln Park", which describes Chicago during the convention. During the convention protests, Ochs described playing his song "I Ain't Marching Anymore" at a demonstration in Grant Park as "the highlight of [his] career." Ochs brought his guitar and was prepared to sing "I Ain't Marching Anymore" during his testimony at the trial of the Chicago Seven, but was denied the opportunity by the judge.
- The 1969 song "Someday (August 29, 1968)" from the first Chicago (then Chicago Transit Authority) self-titled album.
- The 1970 song "Peace Frog" by the Doors includes the line "Blood in the streets/ in the town of Chicago".
- The 1971 song "Chicago" by Graham Nash, on Nash's solo debut album, Songs for Beginners was inspired by the anti-Vietnam protests at the 1968 Democratic National Convention and the trial of the Chicago Eight, and the song opens with a reference to Bobby Seale, who was gagged and chained in the courtroom.

=== Theatre and plays ===
- The 1970 off-Broadway play The Chicago 70 was an improvised drama by the Toronto Workshop Company based on the Chicago Seven trial transcripts and Lewis Carroll's Alice in Wonderland.
- In 1972, playwright and screenwriter David Petersen's play Little Orphan Abbie based on the transcript of the trial, opened in Seattle, directed by Jody Briggs and starring Glenn Mazen. It was slated for production in New York by director Joe Papp, but had to be postponed and finally cancelled due to extended runs of other plays. It was later produced in Los Angeles, first on stage at the Burbage Theater, directed by Ron Hunter. It was later shot for television by Telemedia Productions, directed by Dick Studebaker. The television version used stock footage of the events in the parks and on the streets of Chicago during the riots.
- In 1979, The Chicago Conspiracy Trial by Ron Sossi and Frank Condon was staged by the Odyssey Theater Ensemble and is based on the trial transcripts. The 15th anniversary production by the Odyssey Theater Ensemble featured Allan Miller (William Kunstler), Albie Selznick (Leonard Weinglass), Paul Provenza (Abbie Hoffman) and George Murdock (Judge Hoffman).
- The 1993 John Goodchild play The Chicago Conspiracy Trial is based on the trial transcripts and produced by L.A. Theatre Works, the BBC and WFMT. The cast included David Schwimmer (Abbie Hoffman), Tom Amandes (Richard Schultz), George Murdock (Judge Julius Hoffman), and Mike Nussbaum (William Kunstler).

=== Parodies ===
- A Far Side cartoon had a boy with seven captured insects looking out on his windowsill to see a bunch of insects marching and holding a sign reading "Free the Mayonnaise Jar Seven".

== See also ==
- Days of Rage
