= Lee Weiner =

American social activist

- Lee Weiner by Franklin McMahon at the Chicago Seven trial, late 1969 or early 1970
- Born: 1939 (age 86–87); Chicago, Illinois, U.S.
- Education: University of Illinois, Urbana-Champaign (BA); Hebrew University; Loyola University, Chicago (MSW); Northwestern University (PhD)

Lee Weiner (born 1939) is an author and member of the Chicago Seven who was charged with "conspiring to use interstate commerce with intent to incite a riot" and "teaching demonstrators how to construct incendiary devices that would be used in civil disturbances" at the 1968 Democratic National Convention. He was acquitted of all charges by the jury and convicted on seven charges of criminal contempt that were later overturned on appeal. In 2020, Weiner published a memoir, Conspiracy to Riot: The Life and Times of One of the Chicago 7.

== Early life and education ==
Lee Weiner was born in 1939 and raised on the South Side of Chicago. Weiner is the only member of the Chicago Seven from Chicago. When the trial of the Chicago Seven began in September 1969, Weiner was a doctoral candidate and teaching assistant at Northwestern University, had previously graduated from the University of Illinois, studied political philosophy at Hebrew University of Jerusalem, and earned a master's degree in social work from Loyola University's School of Social Work in Chicago. At Northwestern University, Weiner worked for Howard S. Becker as a research assistant.

As a caseworker, Weiner witnessed dire poverty in Black neighborhoods, and wrote in his memoir, "Every day ... the work I did drove punishing truths into my head about what was wrong in America."

At the 1968 Chicago demonstrations, Weiner served as a marshal with the National Mobilization Committee to End the War in Vietnam. In 2018, Weiner told Olivia Waxman of TIME magazine that "On Aug[ust] 28, during the huge battle on Michigan Avenue with the National Guard, I separated myself from the crowd to stand on the steps of the Art Institute and watch the crowd of people. It was the only time in my life I thought a revolution might happen in the United States."

== Trial ==
First dubbed the "Conspiracy 8" and later the "Chicago 7", the defendants included Abbie Hoffman and Bobby Seale, as well as "little-known community activist and social worker" Lee Weiner. Each of the defendants contributed an essay to the 1969 book, "The Conspiracy," edited by Peter Babcox and Deborah Abel. In Weiner's essay, "The Political Trial of a People's Insurrection", Weiner writes:

Using the artificial, state-controlled rules of the court, the U.S. government's prosecutors and judge will attempt to interpret the people's insurrection in Chicago as the private and deliberate manipulation of eight evil men. The government will be desperate to play down the independent action of thousands of people who openly resisted illegitimate political and police power. The trial, therefore, must blur and soften the contours of what actually happened, and instead focus upon and magnify the roles of these eight men in particular. The alternative image – one of a popular insurrection rooted in the experience and desires of people that was put down by the deliberate exercise of state-controlled violence – too clearly focuses public attention on what America is all about. The government effort is intended to punish and frighten a growing, insurgent mass movement of both the young and concerned adults, and to protect the official myths of political reality in America.

J. Anthony Lukas described Weiner as "a strangely remote figure who shunned most of the defendants' extracurricular activities." According to Professor Douglas Linder at the University of Missouri–Kansas City School of Law, "Weiner rarely attended defense strategy sessions, perhaps out of a belief that their cause was hopeless. He spent most of his trial hours reading science fiction paperbacks or books on eastern philosophy. Weiner reacted to few courtroom developments, viewing the proceedings with a mixture of scorn and amusement." During the trial, a poster that said "Make a New Year's Revolution, Kids!" featuring Weiner and his girlfriend at the time, Sharon Avery, nude and with lights in their hair, was distributed "to the young people waiting out on the cold to sit in on our trial to thank them for supporting us," according to Weiner.

Groucho Marx was asked to testify at the trial, and Weiner wanted him to teach the courtroom about satire; Groucho said it would be "an honor" but declined, thinking his last name would bias the judge against him. According to Weiner, towards the end of the trial, "there was no question we would be put in jail. I ended up going, mostly for correcting my name. People always pronounced it Wee-ner. It's Wye-ner. When the judge would say Wee-ner, I would shout out, "It's Wye-ner," and he got pissed off and charged me with contempt, which was a perfect summary of my political stance. I was sentenced to two and a half months." While the jury deliberated, the judge cited the defendants and their lawyers for 159 counts of criminal contempt; Weiner was convicted on seven charges of criminal contempt.

After being taken to jail following their convictions for contempt on February 14, 1970, the defendants "almost immediately" stood on top of tables in the common areas and gave speeches of "defiance", getting applause and laughter from fellow inmates, and were quickly put into isolation cells. With the exception of David Dellinger, jail officials cut the long hair of the defendants for 'sanitary reasons.' Weiner recalls Abbie Hoffman "yelled that we should fight, force them to pay a price, that our hair was a symbol of our freedom and of everything we believed and we couldn't just acquiesce," before being held down by guards for the haircut.

On February 19, the jury acquitted all seven defendants of conspiracy and only acquitted Weiner and John Froines on all charges. On February 23, Cook County Sheriff Joseph I. Woods showed pictures of the defendants after their haircuts to an audience that according to John Kifner of The New York Times included "about 100 laughing and applauding members of the Elk Grove Township Republican organization at a meeting in the suburban Mount Prospect Country Club." The defendants were released from jail on February 28, 1970.

Weiner's contempt convictions were later reversed and remanded on appeal. At retrial, Weiner was acquitted of all contempt charges.

== Post-trial ==
After the trial, Weiner left Chicago after accepting an offer to teach in the sociology department of Rutgers University, and moved to Brooklyn with his girlfriend at the time, Sharon Avery. He also founded a short-lived communist collective in Brooklyn.

People magazine reports, "At a birthday party for Black Panther leader Bobby Seale in 1972, Weiner was overheard joking that he was "starting a new Communist party in New Jersey." The remark turned up in print, and he was told that his teaching contract at Rutgers would not be renewed." Weiner completed his PhD in sociology and dissertation, The Professional Revolutionary: Notes on the Initiation and Development of Careers in Revolution Making in 1975.

In the years following the trial, Weiner continued to work and protest for causes, including by participating in protests for Russian Jews and more funding for AIDS research. In the 1980s, while residing in Washington, D.C., he ran a home-based fundraising and direct-mail firm for political candidates and organizations. He later worked for the Anti-Defamation League of B'nai B'rith in New York for 15 years, and was a vice president for direct response at the AmeriCares Foundation in Stamford, Connecticut. He currently resides in Florida, and has offered commentary on similarities from his experience and protests in 2020 and 2021.

== Memoir ==
Weiner has written a memoir, Conspiracy to Riot: The Life and Times of One of the Chicago 7, published in August 2020 by Belt Publishing. An excerpt was published by Belt Magazine on July 23, 2020.

According to Malik Jackson, writing for South Side Weekly, "when reading Weiner's recollection of the demonstrations, which mostly took place on Michigan Ave. and in Grant Park, one is struck by the similarities between this imagery and the events we've witnessed on our own streets in recent years. There is the common instance of police charging crowds and trampling protesters, picking out individuals at random to beat with clubs. There were other instances of undercover cops blending into the crowd to overhear strategic discussions between marshals and subsequently stalking them—which is how Weiner was caught and indicted."

Kirkus Reviews describes the memoir as "a welcome addition to the library of the countercultural left," noting "Weiner closes with a stirring paean to activism. 'While a political life isn't easy,' he writes, 'and while frustration, anger, disappointment, fear, and confusion are sometimes pieces of it, I believe there is no more self-respecting, fulfilling life to try to lead.'"

== Media ==
- Jeremy Kagan interviewed Lee Weiner in 1987 in Conspiracy: The Trial of the Chicago 8 for a personal account of his experiences.
- Oren Nimni and Nathan J. Robinson of Current Affairs conducted a live interview with Lee Weiner, who "speaks about his childhood as a red diaper baby, becoming involved with radical anti-war politics, and being put on mass-televised trial for conspiracy and inciting to riot outside the 1968 Democratic National Convention."
- Malik Jackson of South Side Weekly conducted a live interview with Lee Weiner about his memoir Conspiracy to Riot: The Life and Times of One of the Chicago Seven. "In the conversation, Weiner discusses his life of activism beyond the famous trial where he and seven other organizers were targeted and tried for conspiracy in federal court for their role in the demonstrations at the 1968 Democratic National Convention."
- "The story of the Chicago 7 trial" (Interview with Lee Weiner, CBS Sunday Morning, October 4, 2020)
- Phil Manicki interviewed Lee Weiner about his history as a protester, his work as a community organizer, the Chicago Seven, and more.
- In 2021, Weiner, Aaron Sorkin, Sacha Baron Cohen, Dolores Huerta, Baratunde Thurston, Jill Wine-Banks and Olivia Munn participated in Chicago 7 Town Hall: Voices For Change by Netflix, moderated by Katty Kay.

== In popular culture ==
- Weiner was portrayed by Robert Fieldsteel and appears in the 1987 film Conspiracy: The Trial of the Chicago 8. "The people who were growing up then are in positions of authority now," Weiner said in 1987, "and this was real important in people's lives. Politics is real, again, in people's lives. The message of the trial is that people can and should act politically. In almost every context, there's a way to act politically, effectively."
- Marc Aubin portrayed Weiner in the 2000 film Steal This Movie!
- Chuck Montgomery portrayed Weiner in the 2007 film Chicago 10
- Aaron Abrams portrayed Weiner in the 2011 film The Chicago 8
- Weiner was portrayed by Noah Robbins in the 2020 Sorkin film The Trial of the Chicago 7. When discussing "creative liberties with history" taken by Sorkin "that end up distorting it," Nathan J. Robinson of Current Affairs notes, "defendant Lee Weiner was extremely hairy and hippie-ish but is presented in the film as clean-cut and nerdy." Weiner told The Mirror he believes their story is highly relevant to 2020, and “It is a movie. It is not a documentary. The movie does work – it shows and tells people that resistance to injustice is both possible and necessary – whether it be on the streets with brutal police or in a biased, ugly courtroom."
