= John Froines =

American chemist and anti-war activist (1939–2022)

- Born: John Radford Froines; June 13, 1939; Oakland, California, U.S.
- Died: July 13, 2022 (aged 83); Santa Monica, California, U.S.
- Education: University of California, Berkeley (BS); Yale University (MS, PhD)
- Scientific career
- Fields: Organic chemistry
- Thesis: Investigations of internal returns in selected small ring compounds (1967)
- Doctoral advisor: Kenneth B. Wiberg

John Radford Froines (/ˈfroʊ.ɪnz/; June 13, 1939 – July 13, 2022) was an American chemist and anti-war activist, noted as a member of the Chicago Seven, a group charged with involvement with the riots at the 1968 Democratic National Convention in Chicago. Froines, who held a Ph.D. in chemistry from Yale, was charged with interstate travel for purposes of inciting a riot and with making incendiary devices, but was acquitted. He later served as the Director of Toxic Substances at the federal Occupational Safety and Health Administration and then director of UCLA’s Occupational Health Center. He also served as chair of the California Scientific Review Panel on Toxic Air Contaminants for nearly 30 years before resigning in 2013 amid controversy and claims of conflict of interest.

== Early life and education ==
Froines was born in Oakland, California, on June 13, 1939. His father, George, worked as a shipyard worker and was murdered when John was three years old; his mother, Katherine (Livingston), was a teacher who raised John and his younger brother Robert as a single parent after her husband's death. Froines enlisted in the Air National Guard after completing high school. He then received an associate degree at Contra Costa Community College. He studied chemistry at the University of California, Berkeley, graduating with a Bachelor of Science in 1963.

Froines subsequently undertook postgraduate studies at Yale University, obtaining a Master of Science in 1964 before being awarded a Doctor of Philosophy three years later. His graduate work was done in the laboratory of Dr. Kenneth Wiberg, Yale Professor Emeritus. He won a post-doctoral fellowship from the National Science Foundation to work in the laboratory of Nobel Prize-winning chemist, Dr. George Porter, at the Royal Institution of Great Britain in London from 1966 to 1968.

== Activism and the Chicago Seven conspiracy trial ==
While at Yale, Froines was active in a Students for a Democratic Society (SDS) organizing project in the Hill neighborhood, adjacent to downtown New Haven. Community organizing projects inspired by SDS, and in particular, its first president Tom Hayden, were launched by civil rights and anti-poverty activists in various cities such as Newark, Boston, Cleveland, Chicago, and Oakland. Just as civil rights organizations in the American South were organizing for voting rights and political power for Black Americans, a northern SDS-led movement supported peoples’ community organizations in urban areas to gain some control over policies that were affecting their lives, in particular the severely sub-standard housing and inadequate social welfare programs.

Noted as a member of the Chicago Seven, Froines was indicted along with seven others by the U.S. Justice Department under President Nixon in March 1969 for their participation and leadership in events at the protest demonstrations during the 1968 Democratic National Convention in Chicago. The two-count indictment cited “conspiracy to travel interstate to incite a riot,” and inciting a riot.

After a lengthy trial that drew national media attention, two of the defendants, Froines and Lee Weiner, were acquitted of the charges against them; the others were found guilty on one count. The contempt of court findings, which included those against Froines, were rejected in their entirety after an appeal. According to Gary Libman at The Los Angeles Times, "Froines' courtroom antics were comparatively mild," and included telling jurors that one of the defendants, Black Panther leader Bobby Seale, had been sentenced to four years in prison for contempt while the jury was outside the courtroom. Seale had his case severed from the other defendants after the judge refused to acknowledge his right to have an attorney of his choosing, and had him gagged and bound in the courtroom in an effort to silence him. Upon appeals all convictions in the Chicago Conspiracy Trial (the “Chicago Seven”) were overturned, along with the contempt of court charges leveled by trial judge Julius Hoffman against all defendants.

While still waiting for acquittal in the early 1970s, Froines joined the faculty at Goddard College in Vermont, where he taught chemistry.

From 1970 to 1971, Froines and his wife Ann lived in New Haven, Connecticut, where both worked with the Black Panther Party Defense Committee in support of Bobby Seale and Ericka Huggins during their controversial trial for conspiracy to murder. That trial resulted in a hung jury and the freeing of both defendants. Froines was also involved with organizing the May 1971 antiwar demonstrations in Washington, D.C., a demonstration which resulted in the largest mass arrests in American history.

== Occupational safety and health ==
In September 1968, Froines joined the Chemistry Department at the University of Oregon as an assistant professor. Upon the federal indictments for the activities at the Chicago Democratic Convention, he requested and was granted a leave of absence at the end of his first year of teaching because of the impending trial in Chicago. The university administration resisted the calls for his firing from the university from some Oregon state legislators.

After the two years of full-time anti-war activism, Froines returned to teaching chemistry to undergraduates at Goddard College in Vermont. Two years later he was hired to head the Occupational Health Division of the Vermont Health Department, a position he held for three years. His work focused on health standards for the state's nuclear power plant.

Froines later served as Director of the office of Toxic Substances Standards of the Occupational Safety and Health Administration (OSHA) during the Carter Administration. He was the principal author of important federal standards for regulating workers’ exposure to lead and to cotton dust.

Upon the election of Ronald Reagan, in 1981 Froines took his focus on occupational and environmental health to the Fielding School of Public Health at UCLA, where he became a faculty member. During his tenure at UCLA, he held many leadership roles, including as the director of the Center for Occupational and Environmental Health (for 25 years), the director of the Southern California Particle Center and Supersite, associate director of the Southern California Environmental Health Sciences Center, the director of the UCLA Fogarty Program in Occupational and Environmental Health, and the director of the Sustainable Technology and Policy Program. His research focuses covered the toxicology of arsenic, chromium, and lead, air pollution, and pesticides. He retired in 2011 from the UCLA School of Public Health, in the Department of Environmental Health Sciences.

Also during his career at UCLA, he served for nearly 30 years with other scientists on a state advisory commission, the Scientific Review Panel on Toxic Air Contaminants, and was in later years its chairperson. “Over the decades, the nine-member panel has reviewed 450 assessments on a witch’s brew of toxins: Chloropicrin, methidathion, metam sodium, benzene, tobacco smoke, endosulfan, and many other pesticides and air contaminants that are potential carcinogens, genotoxins, neurotoxins, or all of the above. The panel reviews other scientists’ work, draws conclusions and turns over its best assessment to such regulators as the California Air Resources Board and Department of Pesticide Regulation to develop policy." He resigned in 2013 amid claims that he had conducted independent research with the panel while maintaining ties to other scientists who disapproved of the chemicals he was evaluating, creating a conflict of interest.

=== Controversy ===
Froines was among five University of California scientists who were not re-appointed to the Scientific Review Panel on Toxic Air Contaminants in 2013, after issues were raised about the independence of their scientific recommendations and number of years of service. Part of the controversy involved claims that Froines was in contact with scientists who had stated that some chemicals under review were a public health risk. Froines wrote that the SRP maintained “our commitment to doing the best science possible and we never wavered from that. That is why we were trusted although not always agreed with.” One example of this disagreement was the decision by the California Department of Pesticide Regulations to “ignore its own staff of scientists and a peer review panel led by Froines when setting legal exposure limits of farmworkers to the strawberry fumigant methyl iodide. The department set the limit at more than 100 times what had been recommended. The pesticide was later removed from the market by its manufacturer.

== Awards and recognition ==
The California Air Resources Board honored Froines in 2011 as an “outstanding individual who has made significant contributions toward improving air quality throughout a lifetime of commitment and leadership and innovation in research and environmental policy.”

Physicians for Social Responsibility in Los Angeles recognized Froines and his wife Andrea Hricko in 2012 for their "courageous commitment to scientific integrity and for of increasing our understanding of the health impacts of toxic chemicals on the health of workers and communities."

In 2013, Froines was the Ramazzini Award Recipient and Lecturer for his “pioneering work the develop the federal occupational lead and cotton dust exposure standards in the United States, and his work in California that led to the recognition of diesel exhaust as a significant toxic air contaminant, preserving the health and lives of millions.” The Collegium Ramazzini in Bologna, Italy is an independent, international academy founded in 1982 of internationally renowned experts in the fields of occupational and environmental health.

== Personal life ==
Froines' first marriage was to Ann Rubio Froines. They met while they were involved in the SDS. Together, they had one child (Rebecca). They eventually divorced. He later married Andrea Hricko, and remained married to her until his death. They had one child together (Jonathan).

Froines died on July 13, 2022, at a hospital in Santa Monica, California. He was 83, and suffered from Parkinson's disease prior to his death.

== In popular culture ==
- David Kagen played Froines in the 1987 film Conspiracy: The Trial of the Chicago 8.
- Froines was portrayed by Daniel Flaherty in the 2020 film The Trial of the Chicago 7.
