= Franklin McMahon =

American artist

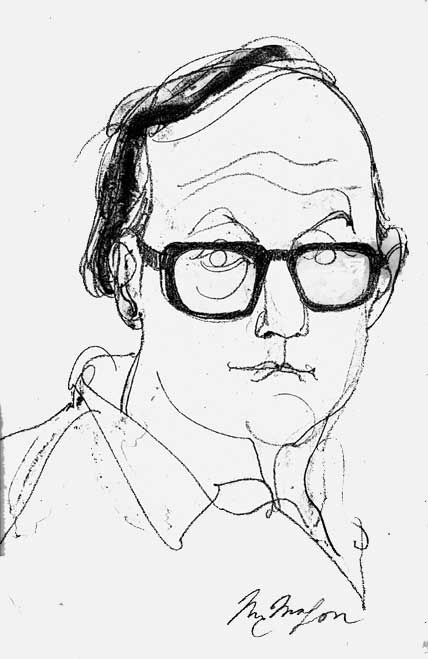
- Self-portrait of Franklin McMahon, circa 1960
- Born: September 9, 1921; Chicago, Illinois, U.S.
- Died: March 3, 2012 (aged 90); Highland Park, Illinois, U.S.
- Occupation: Artist-reporter
- Spouse: Irene Leahy (d. 1997)
- Children: Wm. Franklin, Mark, Mary, Deborah, Patrick, Hugh, Margot, Michelle, Michael
- Parent(s): William McMahon (commodities and oil speculation); Elizabeth Franklin (owner of office supply company)

William Franklin McMahon (September 9, 1921 – March 3, 2012) was an American artist-reporter.

His artistic output also included films and books.

Other than in his very early years when he did illustrations "on spec", he was not an "after-the-fact" illustrator. In his own words, drawing from life made him an "artist-reporter" or a "reportorial artist." "That way," he said, "you can see around the corner."

== Early life ==
Franklin McMahon was born in Chicago, IL in 1921. He and his parents lived in Beverly Hills, CA for a time, returning to Chicago in his teens. He commuted to the Chicago suburb of Oak Park, IL to attend Fenwick High School, where his cartoon drawings were published in the school's newspaper, "The Wick." Collier's Weekly, a weekly national news magazine, noticed one of his cartoons. Thereafter, they paid him when they saw one they wanted to use. When he graduated in 1939, the Colliers connection helped land him his first job, as an apprentice in an art studio. During World War II, he was an Army Air Corps B-17 navigator, and was shot down in action in January 1945. He spent several months in a German prison camp. On occasion, when he could get hold of some paper, he drew his guards.

== Post-war years, family, and continuing life ==
After the war, he married high school sweetheart Irene Leahy and used the GI Bill to attend night classes at Chicago Academy of Fine Arts, American Academy of Art, Harrington College of Design, and the Art Institute of Chicago. Franklin and Irene had nine children. Inspired at a young age by Franklin's work, his son Mark McMahon, went on to continue creating work in the artist-reporter's style.

== Artistic output and areas of activity ==
McMahon's overwhelming main artistic output was his 8,000-9,000 drawings. He also produced films and books. His films incorporate drawings (see Technique section), at a rate of 200–300 drawings per ½ hour of film. The books, although sometimes labelled as "illustrated" by Franklin McMahon, had the same kind of ["on site"] drawings as those from the courtroom, the political arena, and all his other spheres of activity. Even his commercial work had drawings mainly done on site, not after-the-fact illustrations for existing text.

== Civil Rights and the Space Race ==
McMahon's work in both of these aspects of mid-20th Century American history helps illustrate his role as an artist-reporter. He began reporting from the courtroom in 1955, after some of his very early work came to the attention of Life magazine's editors. Because cameras were not allowed at the Mississippi trial of the suspected killers of Chicago teenager Emmett Till, Life commissioned him to go there to sketch courtroom events. His drawings, and in particular, one of Till's great-uncle, Moses Wright, standing to point at the accused men, were seen nationwide. From then on, on-site reporting with his drawings was a major part of his life work.

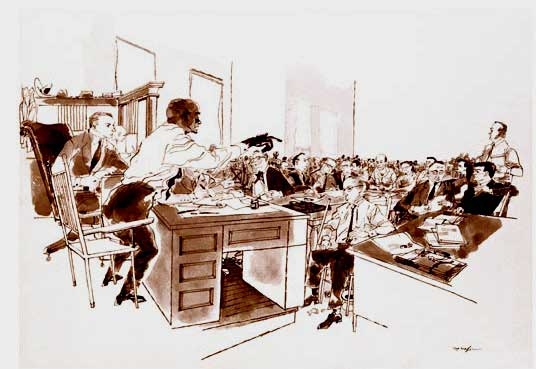
Moses Wright pointing at accused men; Emmett Till Trial, Sumner, Tallahatchie County Mississippi, 1955 published in Life Magazine; Painting by Franklin McMahon

The Emmett Till trial in September 1955 was the early catalyst for the civil rights movement. McMahon's on-site and on-deadline images from Mississippi, published nationwide in Life magazine, provided the visualization that helped spur Rosa Parks' refusal to give up her seat on the bus in December 1955, which then led to the Montgomery bus boycott and to bringing Martin Luther King Jr. to national attention, along with fellow boycott leader Ralph Abernathy. McMahon was in attendance for King's "I Have a Dream" speech during the August 1963 March on Washington for Jobs and Freedom. He also covered the two 1964 mistrials of the murderer of civil rights leader Medgar Evers. In March 1965, King's march for black enfranchisement was going from Selma to the Alabama Capital Montgomery. About that time, Franklin was returning from Cape Kennedy, Florida, after covering one of the US crewed space launches. He heard of the march on his car radio, and took a detour, arriving in time to document King's arrival in Montgomery. He also covered King in Chicago in 1966, the United Farm Workers protest in 1968, and the 1968 Chicago riots following King's death.

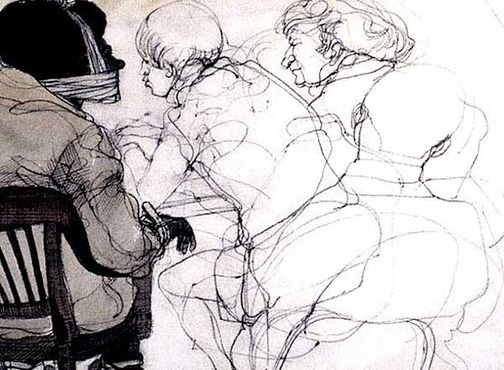
Bobby Seale at the Conspiracy Trial after the 1968 Democratic Convention, Chicago. Painting by Franklin McMahon

In 1969–70, Franklin was courtroom artist at the infamous Chicago Seven "conspiracy" trial of the eight (later just seven) defendants, resulting from protests during the 1968 Democratic Convention in Chicago. The 8th defendant, Bobby Seale, was eventually bound, shackled, and gagged, then separated from the group and sentenced for contempt of court by the judge. The trial lasted five months, with McMahon producing almost 500 courtroom drawings. They were published across the nation, including an entire issue of the Chicago Tribune's Sunday magazine section. The Chicago History Museum currently owns both the collection of 483 drawings from that trial as well as that from the 1955 Emmett Till trial. In 1971, Marv Gold produced and directed the film 69 CR 180, an artist's report by McMahon featuring his courtroom drawings of the 1969 trial. The documentary animation was made, animated and narrated by McMahon, and edited by Ron Clasky.

Civil rights was a continuing interest and vocation: he covered the presidential campaigns of black candidates Shirley Chisholm, U.S. House ('72) and the Reverend Jesse Jackson ('84, '88), and was at the 1995 Million Man March.

During the Space Race of the 1960s and 1970s, Franklin was to return frequently to NASA's mission control, including his coverage of Neil Armstrong's walk on the Moon. All would earn him a mention in NASA's book Eyewitness to Space.

== U.S. Politics ==
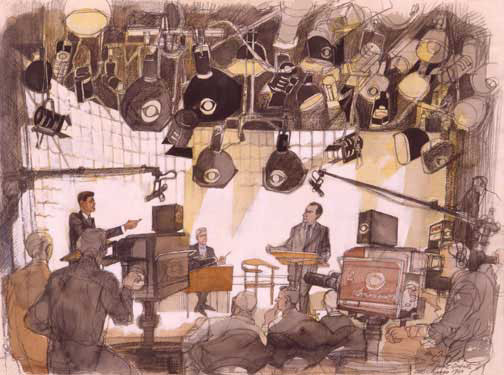
Kennedy-Nixon Debates, Chicago 1960. Painting by Franklin McMahon

He drew Democratic presidential candidate Governor Adlai Stevenson II ('52, '56) at his Libertyville, IL home. One of McMahon's drawings of Stevenson hangs in that home, which is now a state historical site and listed on the National Register of Historic Places. He covered every Democratic and Republican campaign from 1960 through 2008, including attending a vast majority of the conventions, He made first-person drawings of the 1960 Kennedy-Nixon Debates (the first broadcast on live television) and later of Kennedy's funeral. During Richard Nixon's successful 1968 presidential run, Franklin also drew the "unelected White House guys" (H.R. Haldeman, John Ehrlichman and John N. Mitchell), that he correctly predicted would surround Nixon. His take on Nixon's 1974 resignation showed the disgraced ex-president escaping in a helicopter. There are McMahon drawings from the 1973 Watergate hearings, of Senator John McCain's "straight talk express" in New Hampshire in 2000, the stirring Barack Obama speech at the 2004 Democratic Convention, and on the 2004 presidential campaign trail with George W. Bush and Senator John Kerry.

== World religion ==
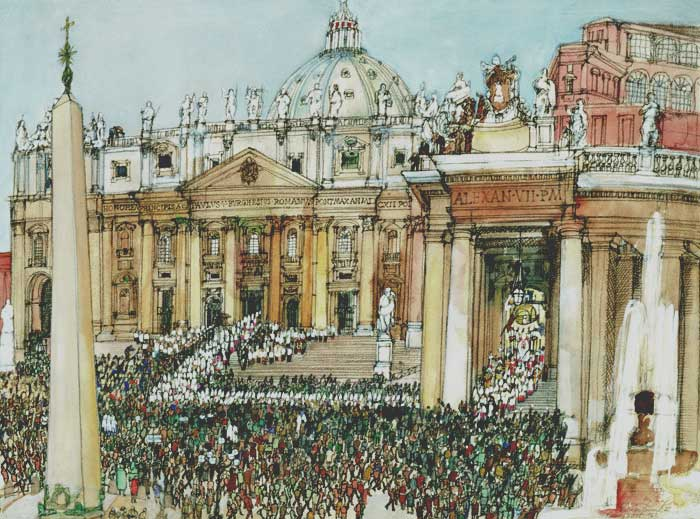
Procession on Opening Day of Second Vatican Council, Rome, 1962 Painting by Franklin McMahon

He was in Rome on October 11, 1962, for Opening Day of the Second Vatican Council, and went on to chronicle that major event through 1965. His film The World of Vatican II covers the opening and closing of Vatican II; and is a literal "travelogue in drawings" of many countries where Catholicism was facing new challenges at that time; and how and by whom they were being met. He followed Papal journeys, Council activations, and ministries in the Church world through the 1970s and 1980s. In the 1990s, he was in Chicago and South Africa with the Parliament of the World's Religions. Drawings he made in South Africa were published by Notre Dame Magazine and accompanied an article by Archbishop Desmond Tutu in U.S. Catholic Magazine.

== Culture and sports ==
McMahon accompanied conductor Sir Georg Solti and the Chicago Symphony Orchestra on their first European tour in 1971. The whimsical title (Real Violins) of his film describing that trip refers to Chicago's reputation as a city where gangsters once carried machine guns in violin cases. He worked for Sports Illustrated Magazine on assignments ranging from the 1959 American League champion baseball team Chicago White Sox and Goose Hunting in Cairo, IL to the Acapulco Yacht Race in Mexico.

== Corporate and industrial ==
McMahon also created artwork for corporations and businesses. A series of decorative plates which he designed with Chicago themes for Continental Illinois National Bank (1972–1982) were given out as premiums at that time. They have since become collector's items, and are still traded on eBay. He did other work for Continental, and also had commercial commissions for McDonald's Corporation, International Harvester, Marshall Field & Company and Borg-Warner, among others. He had been heard to say that his work for Continental put several of his children through college.

== Film productions ==
Franklin and wife, Irene, formed a film distribution company called Rocinante Sight & Sound. They produced several award-winning documentary films, some of which were shown on television (CBS and PBS) for a number of years.

The Chicago Film Archives, a non-profit regional film archive, houses and manages the Franklin McMahon Collection. The collection contains audio reels and films made by Franklin McMahon between the years 1965–1998.

=== Filmography ===
- An American City at Christmas Time: An Artist's View (Chicago, 1978)
- The Artist as Reporter (1977)
- Primary Colors, An Artist on the Campaign Trail., Peabody Award, 1976 (List of Peabody Award winners (1970–1979))
- Real Violins (1975)
- Portrait of an Election WTTW-TV (1972) 2 Chicago Emmys
- 69 CR 180: An Artist's Report (1971)
- World City (1968)
- McMahon's Politicians WTTW-TV (1968) Chicago Emmy
- The World of Vatican II: An Artist's Report (1967)

== Publications ==
His book This Church, These Times contains more than 100 drawings, along with text by Father Francis X. Murphy and introduction by Father Theodore Hesburgh, then the head of the University of Notre Dame. He illustrated an essay on Richard Nixon's White House for World Book Encyclopedia and early in his career, illustrated a number of books for textbook publisher Scott Foresman and Company, including one on the Illinois Constitution, for which he traveled around the state. Other books with his drawings include Vittles and Vice (1952), You are Promise (1974) with Martin Marty, and From the land and back (1972) with Curtis Stadfeld . Also On The Spot Drawing (1969), American national government, Policy and politics, and Eyewitness to Space. In 1994, American Artist Magazine featured his article, "Reporting from Around The World" in their publication, Watercolor.

== Recognition ==
=== Museum and Collection holdings ===
McMahon's work is in the permanent collections of the Library of Congress, the National Air and Space Museum (of the Smithsonian Institution), The University of Chicago, The Borg-Warner Corporation, Time Inc., Binghamton University, The New Britain Museum of American Art, George Washington University, the Lake County IL Discovery Museum as well as the already mentioned 500 + works in the Chicago History Museum. Many of McMahon's works are represented in the Corbis Collection.

=== Exhibitions (a brief list) ===
Works by Franklin McMahon have been exhibited at

- Smithsonian Institution in Washington, D.C.
- Chicago History Museum in Chicago, IL
- New-York Historical Society Museum & Library in New York City
- Brooklyn Museum in Brooklyn, NY
- The John and Mable Ringling Museum of Art of Art in Sarasota, FL
- The Art Institute of Chicago
- Loyola University Museum of Art
- Lake County IL Discovery Museum
- The Mint Museum in Charlotte, NC
- Snite Museum of Art in Notre Dame, IN
- Chicago Botanic Garden in Glencoe, IL
- CNN Center in Atlanta. GA
- Park Avenue Atrium Gallery in New York City
- Kraushaar Galleries in New York City
- The Peace Museum in Chicago, IL (museum closed in 2007)
- Selma Performing Arts Center in Selma, AL
- Benedicta Arts Center in St. Joseph, MN

=== Honors and awards ===
McMahon won the Renaissance Prize of the Art Institute of Chicago. The Society of Illustrators elected him to its Hall of Fame in 2001, and the Artists Guild of New York chose him as "Artist of the Year" in 1963. His documentary films of several presidential campaigns earned him three Emmy Awards and a Peabody Award. He also received the Minority Economic Resources Corporation's Martin Luther King Jr. Award for Civil Rights Achievement (2000), and honorary degrees from Loyola University Chicago (1985) and Lake Forest College(1979). He was a part of the guiding faculty of the Famous Artists School and served as a guest instructor at Syracuse University, Rhode Island School of Design and The Smithsonian Institution. McMahon was a long-standing member of The Society of Typographic Arts (STA), Chicago of which he is an Honorary Member, and a thirty-six year member of the Twenty—Seven Chicago Designers (1950–1986).

== Technique ==
Franklin McMahon's on-the-spot drawings were generally done with a charcoal pencil, then colored in his home studio afterwards, using acrylic watercolors.

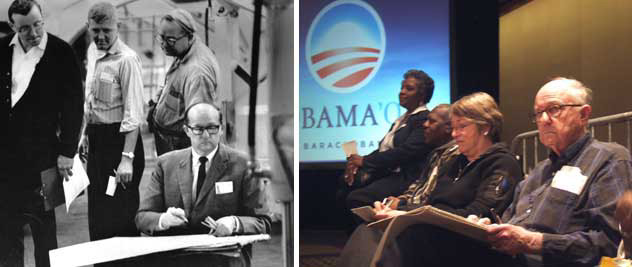
Franklin McMahon drawing in an International Harvester plant circa 1970 and at an Obama '08 victory rally. Photos by Angus MacDougall and Wm. Franklin McMahon

In the films for which he won the Emmy and Peabody awards, the process is similar to what is often done when scanning old daguerreotypes: using a moving camera to make more than a dry slideshow from a series of still images. However, in his films, the path of the camera is computerized, liberal use is made of zooming, and a carefully selected soundtrack accompanies all. The "digital age" equivalent is known as the Ken Burns Effect, but McMahon's films were made decades before Burns' work, and the effect is somewhat different. The following is typical of the reaction when such films of his works are seen by viewers:

This ... motion picture is a film of drawings, but not of static drawings ... it seems to have been made by cameras moving seamlessly over hundreds of drawings. The overall effect is almost that it has been filmed live ... yet it is ... drawings.
