= 1968 Democratic National Convention =

Selection of the Democratic nominee for the 1968 U.S. presidential election in Chicago

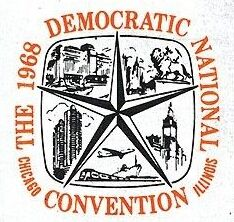
- 1968 presidential election

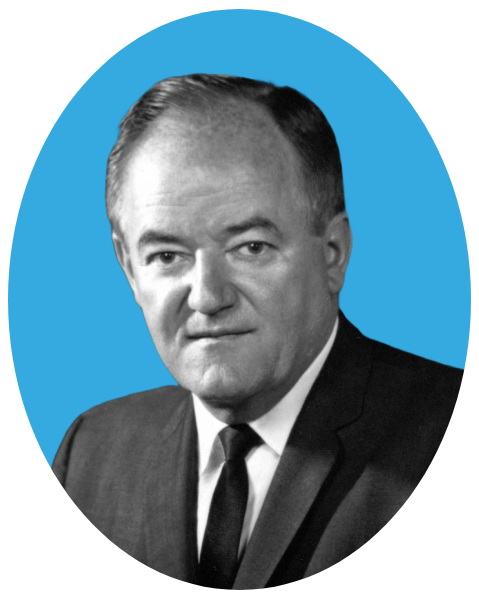
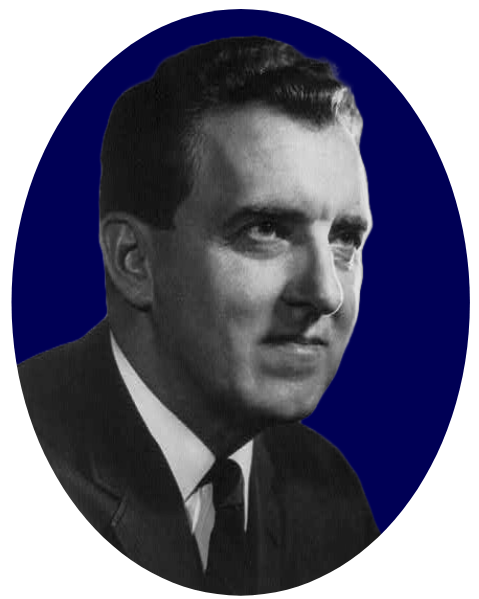
- Nominees; Humphrey and Muskie

Convention
- Dates: August 26–29, 1968
- City: Chicago, Illinois
- Venue: International Amphitheatre

Candidates
- Presidential nominee: Hubert Humphrey of Minnesota
- Vice-presidential nominee: Edmund Muskie of Maine
- Other candidates: Eugene McCarthy; George McGovern

The 1968 Democratic National Convention was held August 26–29 at the International Amphitheatre in Chicago, Illinois, United States. Earlier that year incumbent President Lyndon B. Johnson had announced he would not seek reelection, thus making the purpose of the convention to select a new presidential nominee for the Democratic Party. Vice President Hubert Humphrey and Senator Edmund Muskie of Maine were nominated for president and vice president, respectively.

The event was among the most tense and confrontational political conventions in American history, and became notorious for the televised heavy-handed police tactics of the host, Mayor Richard J. Daley of Chicago. The most contentious issues were the continuing American military involvement in the Vietnam War, and expanding the right to vote to draft-age soldiers by lowering the voting age from 21 to 18 years old. Dissatisfaction with the convention led to significant changes in the rules governing delegate selection, ushering in the modern primary election system.

The year 1968 was a time of riots, political turbulence, and mass civil unrest. The assassination of Martin Luther King Jr. in April of that year, following his opposition to the Vietnam War, further inflamed racial tensions, and protest riots in more than 100 cities followed. The convention also followed the assassination of Robert F. Kennedy, a candidate in the primary, on June 5. Currently second in delegates at the time of his death to the pro-war Humphrey, the loss of Kennedy saw his committed delegates go for Humphrey over candidate Eugene McCarthy, who had been third in delegates.

The Humphrey–Muskie ticket failed to win the confidence of Democratic voters, to unite liberals, or to attract anti-war voters. They were later defeated in the presidential election by the "silent majority" Republican ticket of Richard Nixon and Spiro Agnew.

== Before the convention ==
Film from inside the convention by the United States Information Agency

The Democratic Party, which controlled the House, the Senate, and the White House in 1968, was divided. Senator Eugene McCarthy entered the campaign in November 1967, challenging incumbent President Lyndon Johnson for the Democratic nomination. Senator Robert F. Kennedy entered the race in March 1968.

Johnson, facing dissent within his party, never entered the 1968 race but won the New Hampshire presidential primary in March 1968 as a write-in candidate; he then announced on March 31 that he would not seek re-election. The Wisconsin primary was scheduled for April 2, and public opinion polls showed Johnson as third in the race, behind McCarthy and Kennedy. In his television address announcing his withdrawal from the presidential race, Johnson also announced the United States would stop bombing North Vietnam north of the 19th parallel and was willing to open peace talks. On April 27 Vice President Hubert Humphrey entered the race but did not compete in any primaries; instead he inherited the delegates previously pledged to Johnson and then collected delegates in caucus states, especially in caucuses controlled by local Democratic bosses.

Vietnam War peace talks had begun in Paris on May 13, 1968, but almost immediately became deadlocked as Xuan Thuy, the head of the North Vietnamese delegation, demanded that the U.S. give a promise to unconditionally stop bombing North Vietnam, a demand rejected by W. Averell Harriman of the American delegation. From the start of the bombing under Operation Rolling Thunder in 1965, the North Vietnamese had demanded the U.S. unconditionally halt the bombing as the first step towards peace. It soon became apparent that no progress would be possible in Paris until the U.S. promised to unconditionally cease bombing, as the talks floundered on that issue through the spring, summer and fall of 1968.

After Robert Kennedy's assassination on June 5, the Democratic Party's divisions grew. At the moment of Kennedy's death the delegate count stood at Humphrey 561.5, Kennedy 393.5, McCarthy 258. Kennedy's murder left his delegates uncommitted. Support within the Democratic Party was divided between McCarthy, who ran a decidedly anti-war campaign and was seen as the peace candidate; Humphrey, who was seen as the candidate representing the more hawkish Johnson point of view; and Senator George McGovern, who appealed to some of Kennedy's supporters.

When Vice President Humphrey arrived in Chicago, Daley was not at the airport to greet him, instead sending a police bagpipe band to welcome him. As Humphrey was driven to the Conrad Hilton hotel, he noticed that no one in the streets cheered him, in marked contrast to the arrival of McCarthy, who had been greeted by 5,000 cheering supporters.

== Convention ==
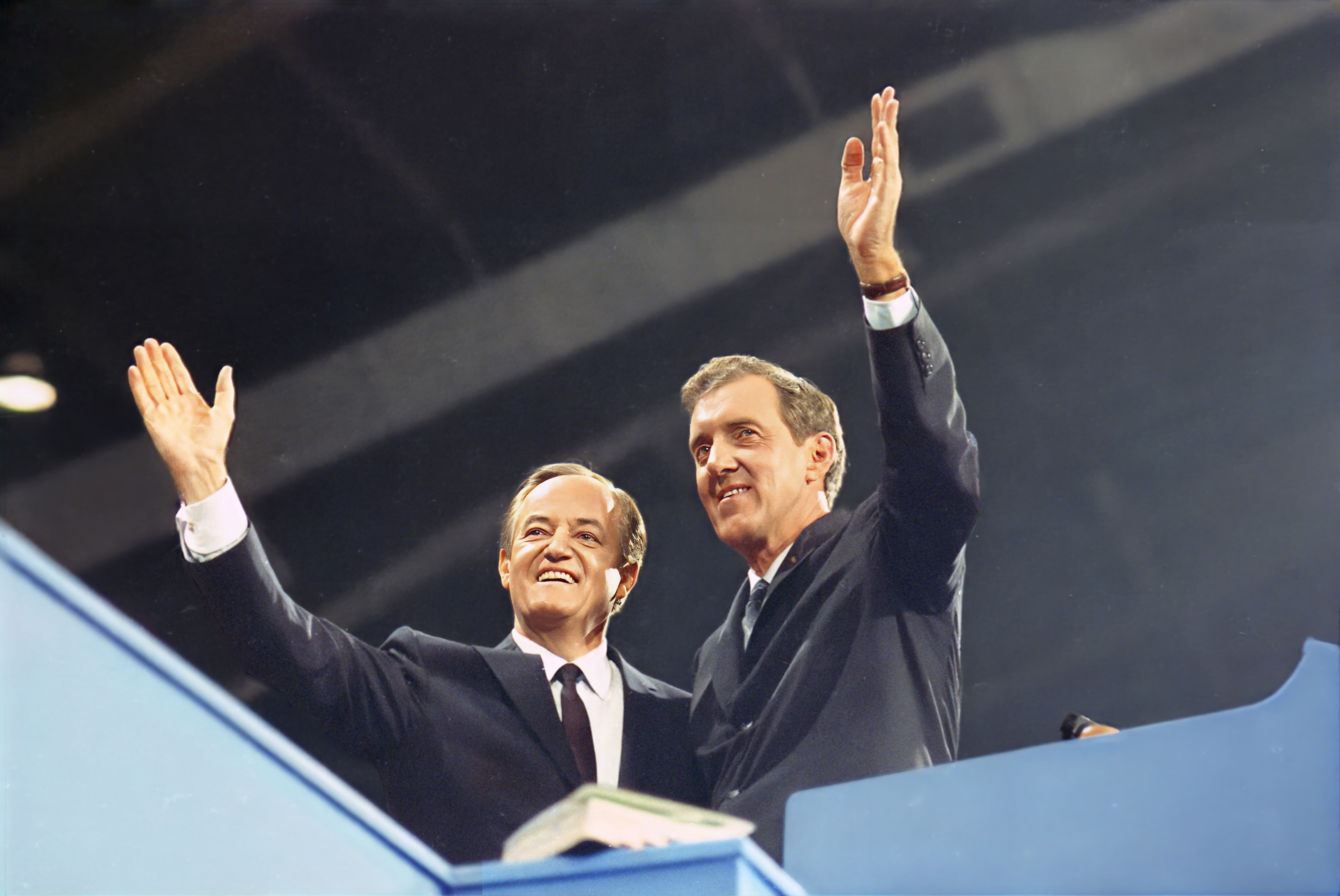
Humphrey and Muskie together at the Democratic National Convention

The convention was among the most tense and confrontational political conventions ever in American history, marked by fierce debate and protest over the Vietnam peace talks and controversy over the heavy-handed police tactics of the convention's host, Mayor Richard J. Daley of Chicago. The keynote speaker was Senator Daniel Inouye of Hawaii.

Before the start of the convention on August 26, several states had competing slates of delegates attempting to be seated at the convention. Some of these delegate credential fights went to the floor of the convention on August 26, where votes were held to determine which slates of delegates representing Texas, Georgia, Alabama, Mississippi and North Carolina would be seated at the convention. The more racially integrated challenging slate from Texas was defeated.

The Conrad Hilton Hotel served as the headquarters hotel for the convention.

=== Vietnam war plank and Johnson's influence ===
Within the convention, tensions arose between pro-war and anti-war Democrats. One of the principal issues at the peace talks in Paris was the North Vietnamese demand that the U.S. unconditionally cease bombing North Vietnam before discussing any other matters. The more dovish Democrats favored the North Vietnamese demand while more hawkish Democrats demanded the North Vietnamese promise to close the Ho Chi Minh Trail as the price of a bombing pause, a demand the North Vietnamese rejected. Vice President Humphrey, confronted with a divided party, attempted to craft a party platform that would appeal to both factions, calling for a bombing pause that "took into account, most importantly, the risk to American troops as well as the response from Hanoi." Humphrey's platform tacitly implied that he would order a complete bombing pause if elected. Anticipating the "Vietnamization" strategy later carried out by Richard Nixon, Humphrey's platform called for the "de-Americanization" of the war as the U.S. gradually pulled American troops out from South Vietnam and shifted the burden of fighting back to the South Vietnamese.

Johnson, despite spending the week at his Texas ranch, maintained tight control over the proceedings, going so far as to have the Federal Bureau of Investigation illegally tap Humphrey's telephones to find out his plans. Humphrey previewed his platform to two of Johnson's more hawkish advisers, Secretary of State Dean Rusk and National Security Advisor Walt Whitman Rostow. Rostow very reluctantly gave his approval while Rusk told Humphrey, "We can live with this, Hubert." Johnson angrily rejected Humphrey's compromise peace plank as a personal affront, telling Humphrey in a telephone call to change it at once. When Humphrey protested that "Dean Rusk approved it," Johnson shouted over the phone: "That's not the way I hear it. Well, this just undercuts our whole policy, and by God, the Democratic Party ought not to be doing that to me, and you ought not to be doing it. You've been a part of the policy." To put further pressure on Humphrey, Johnson called up General Creighton Abrams, the commander of the U.S. forces in Vietnam, to ask if a complete bombing pause would endanger the lives of American soldiers; Abrams, unaware of the intra-Democratic dispute, wrote back that it would. Johnson gave a copy to Hale Boggs, chairman of the Democratic National Committee (DNC), who in turn showed it to various leading delegates to show how reckless and "unpatriotic" Humphrey was in contemplating a bombing pause. Faced with Johnson's fury, Humphrey gave in and accepted a plank more to Johnson's liking. Johnson always felt contempt for Humphrey and liked to bully him, telling Secretary of Defense Clark Clifford that he would respect Humphrey more if only he "showed he had some balls". Though some of Humphrey's advisors counseled him to defy the lame-duck president, Humphrey resignedly stated: "Well, it would not look like an act based on principle or conviction; it would seem like a gimmick. It would seem strange. And it would enrage the president."

The platform that Humphrey had written on Johnson's dictation was intended to be introduced onto the floor of the convention at the end of Day 2 — well after midnight — before Donald Peterson, the manager of Senator McCarthy's campaign in Wisconsin and the head of the Wisconsin delegation, motioned to adjourn the convention and platform fight until the next day. A supporter of the minority plank, he stated his desire for the viewing public to see the debate and for the plank to be debated with full energy. Convention chairman Carl Albert claimed the motion to adjourn was not a recognized motion and declared Peterson out of order. The exhausted delegates on the floor rallied behind the adjournment motion and began chanting "let's go home!", leading to Mayor Daley taking to a microphone and calling for the removal of people in the rafters whom he mistakenly believed to be responsible for the uproar. When this failed to quell the enthusiasm, Daley took to the mic again, now to second the adjournment motion; Daley was not declared out of order, and the mayor's motion was recognized by chairman Albert.

When the plank was finally introduced, it prompted a passionate three-hour long floor debate as anti-war Democrats obstinately objected. The platform was passed with 1,567 delegates (60%) voting for the platform and 1,041 (40%) voting against. When the platform was passed, the delegation from New York put on black armbands and began to sing "We Shall Overcome" in protest. Humphrey later stated that his biggest mistake of the election was to give in to Johnson, contending that if he stuck to his original platform it would have shown his independence and given him a lead in the polls. Humphrey always believed that if he had given his planned speech (which he instead gave in Salt Lake City on September 30, 1968) calling for an unconditional bombing pause of North Vietnam as "an acceptable risk for peace", that he would have won the election.

Humphrey also complained that the convention had been held in late August to coincide with Johnson's birthday, which cost him a month to organize, preferring to have the convention held in July. Complicating the election was the third party candidacy of former Alabama governor George Wallace, who ran on a white supremacist platform promising to undo the changes of the Civil Rights Movement. Conservative whites in the South had long voted as a bloc for the Democrats, but in the 1960s many were starting to move away from the Democratic Party. Nixon had embarked on his Southern strategy of wooing conservative Southern whites over to the Republicans, but Wallace, more extreme on racial questions than was possible for Nixon, threatened to preempt the Southern strategy. Johnson had wanted Humphrey to nominate as his running mate a conservative white Southern Democrat who might prevent Southern whites from voting for Wallace or Nixon, bringing back one of the most loyal Democratic voting blocs of the past century. Humphrey mustered the courage to defy Johnson and choose as his running mate Senator Edmund Muskie of Maine, a dignified, centrist Democrat.

Humphrey had been well known as a liberal supporter of the Civil Rights Movement, and he felt that with Nixon and Wallace competing for the conservative white Southern voters there was no realistic opportunity for him to appeal to that group. In 1948, Humphrey, at that time the mayor of Minneapolis, had first come to national attention when he delivered a speech at the 1948 Democratic National Convention denouncing racial injustices in the South. However, over the protests of liberals, Humphrey did not resist Johnson's decision to seat several all-white delegations from several Southern states despite the complaints that Black Americans (and in the case of the Texas delegation, Mexican-Americans) had been systematically excluded.

Though Johnson had publicly dropped out of the presidential election, he entertained thoughts of re-entering it. He sent his friend and colleague, Texas Governor John Connally, to meet with other southern Democratic governors attending the convention to inquire if they would be willing to support nominating Johnson. Mayor Daley, a strong Johnson supporter, was enthusiastic about having Johnson re-enter. Daley, who was apparently oblivious of the deep antagonism between Johnson and the Kennedy family, favored Senator Ted Kennedy for Johnson's running mate, saying that an "LBJ-TEK" ticket would win easily. Daley was so committed to having Johnson re-enter the race that he had secretly printed up signs reading "We Love LBJ". He also called up Kennedy to discuss his plans, but Kennedy, who was suffering from depression after the recent assassination of his brother Robert, was not interested. It remains unclear if Johnson was serious about re-entering, or if he was merely using the prospect as a threat to control Humphrey. In the end, Connally's polling found the general feeling about the plan to be "No way!"

=== Nomination results ===
In the end, the Democratic Party nominated Humphrey. The delegates had defeated the peace plank by 1,567 3/4 to 1,041 1/4. The loss was perceived to be the result of Johnson and Daley influencing behind the scenes. Humphrey, who had not entered any of the thirteen state primary elections, won the Democratic nomination shortly after midnight, and many delegates shouted, "No! No!" when his victory was announced. The nomination was watched by 89 million Americans. As a sign of racial reconciliation, Humphrey had intended for his nomination to be seconded by a speech by Carl Stokes, the Black mayor of Cleveland, Ohio. Stokes's speech was not shown on live national television as planned, as the networks instead broadcast live the "Battle of Michigan Avenue" that was taking place in front of the Conrad Hilton Hotel. Humphrey announced Senator Edmund Muskie of Maine as his running mate the following morning, whose selection was welcomed by those attending his announcement and ratified by the convention that evening with 1942.5 delegate votes on the first ballot. Humphrey went on to lose the 1968 presidential election to the Republican Richard Nixon.

==== Gallery of candidates ====
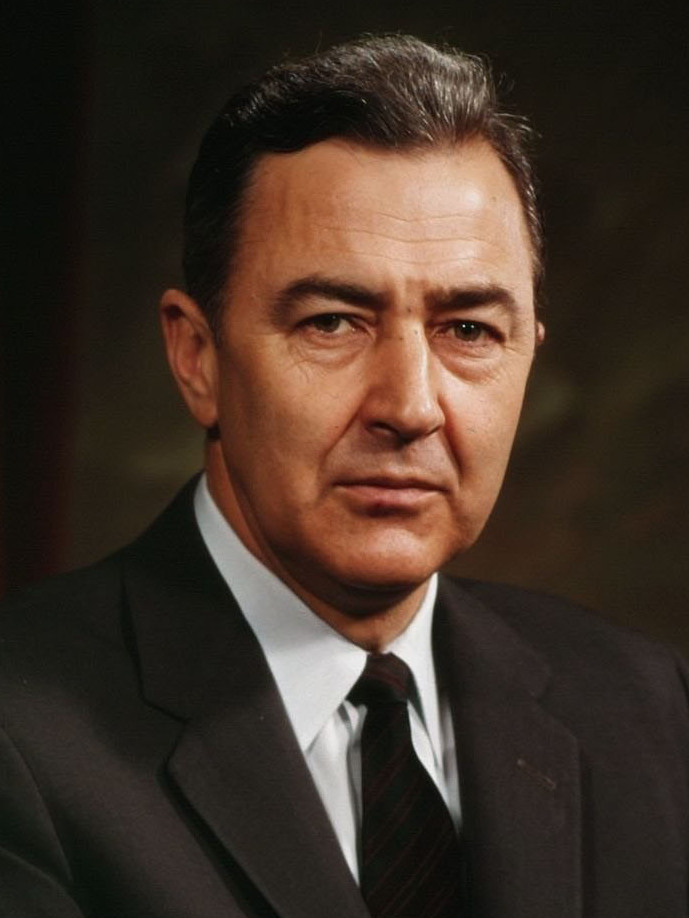
Senator
Eugene McCarthy
of Minnesota
(1959-1971)

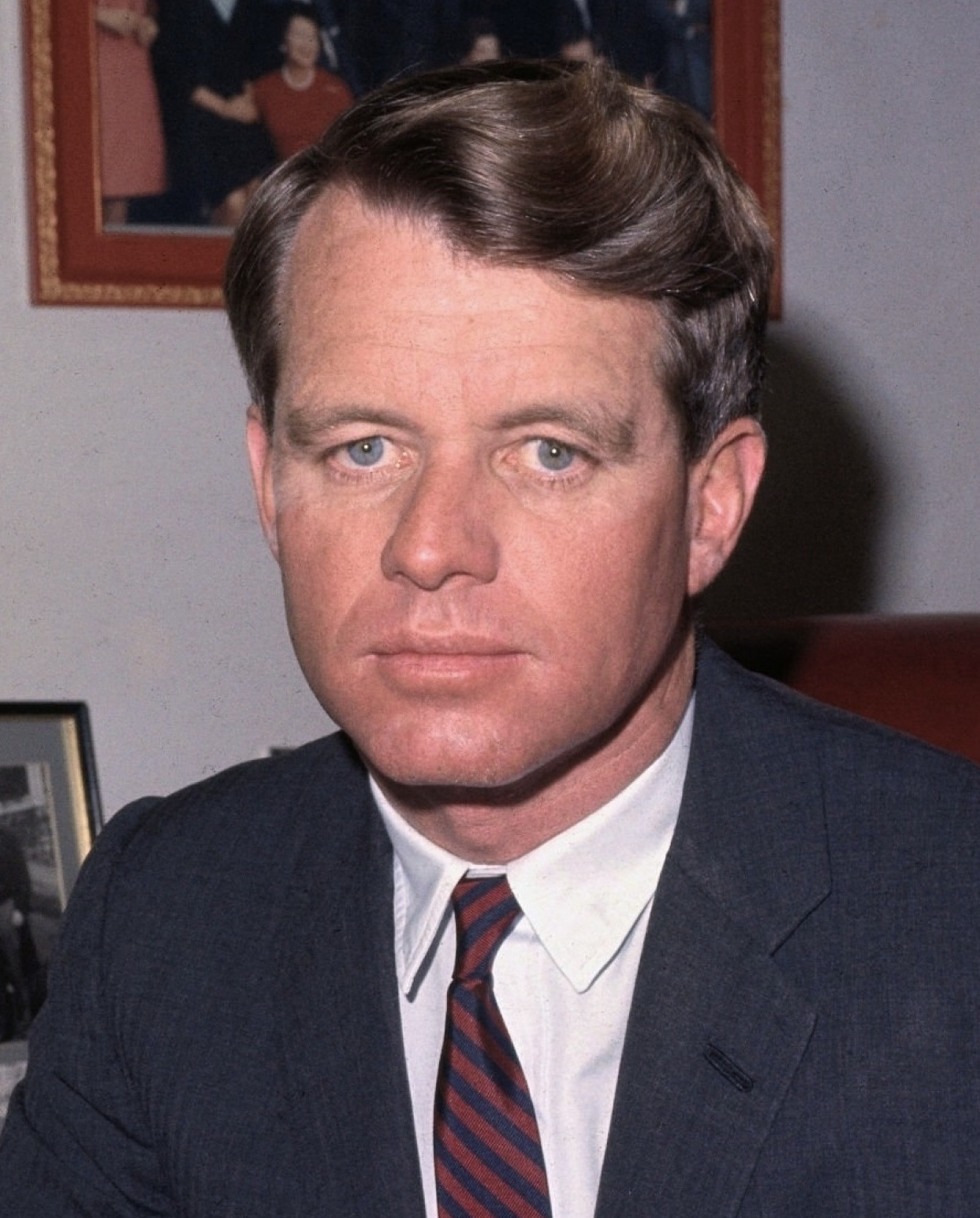
Senator
Robert F. Kennedy
of New York
(1965-1968)
(assassinated)

Senator
George McGovern
of South Dakota
(1963-1981)

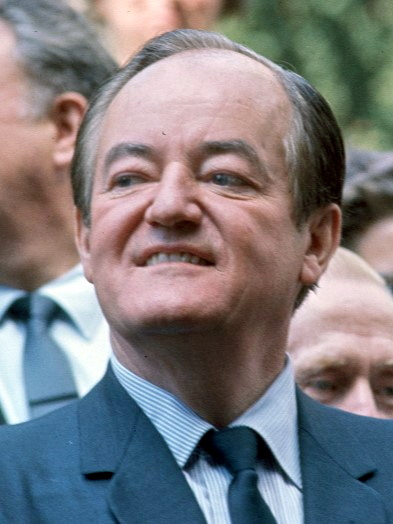
Vice President
Hubert Humphrey
of Minnesota
(1965–1969)

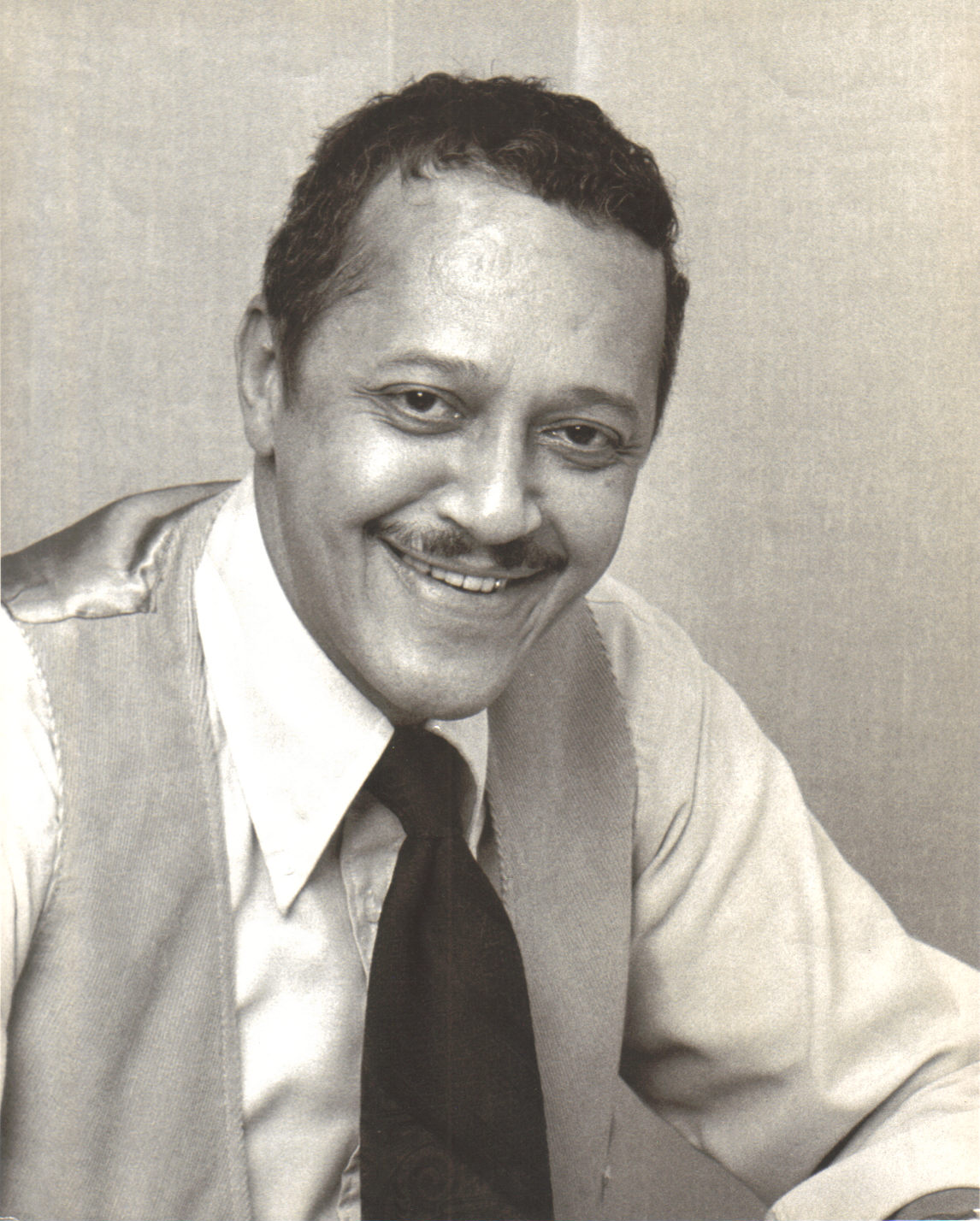
Civil rights activist
Channing Phillips
of Washington, D.C.
(1959-1971)

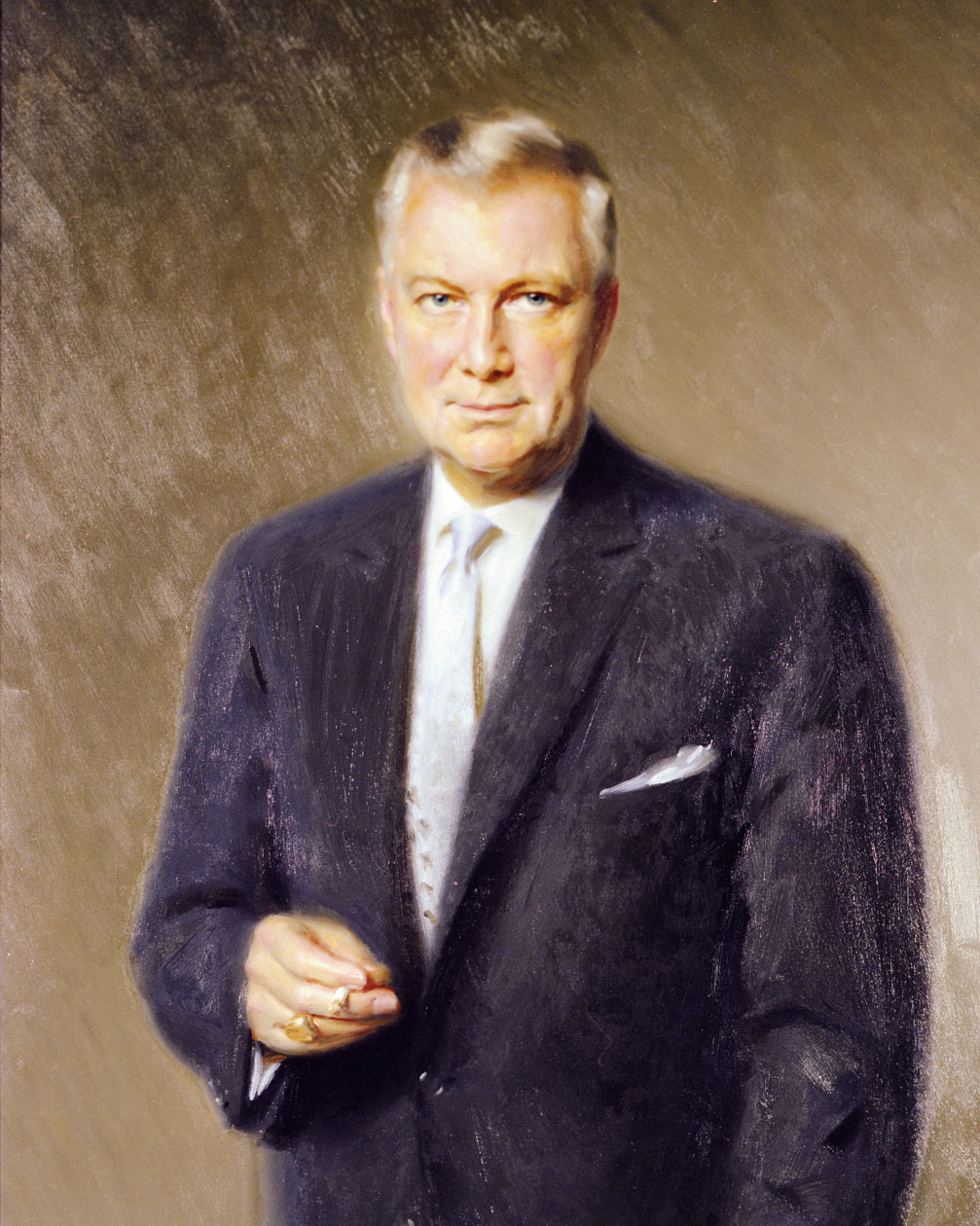
Governor
Dan K. Moore
of North Carolina
(1965–1969)

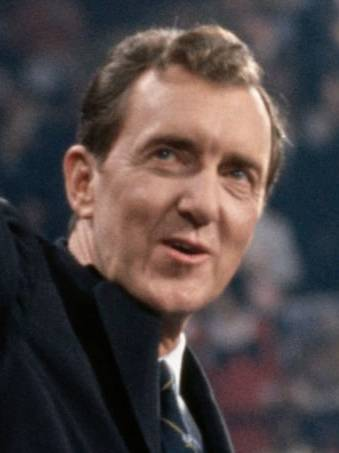
Senator
Edmund Muskie
of Maine
(1959–1980)
(Nominated for vice presidency)

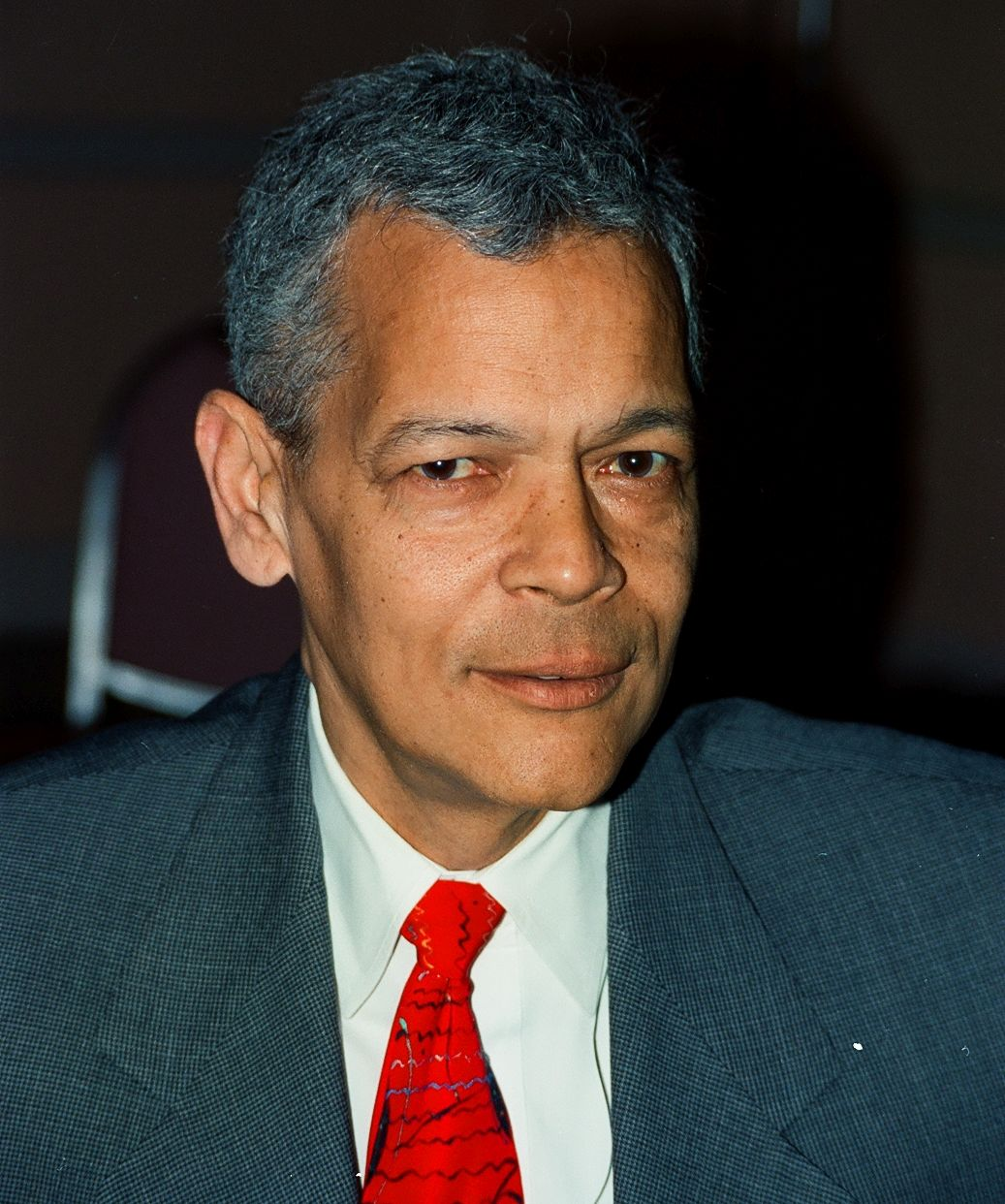
State Representative
Julian Bond
from Georgia
(1967-1975)

==== First ballot ====
1968 Democratic National Convention nomination votes
Presidential candidate	Presidential tally	Vice presidential candidate	Vice presidential tally
Hubert Humphrey	1759.25	Edmund S. Muskie	1942.5
Eugene McCarthy	601	Not Voting	604.25
George S. McGovern	146.5	Julian Bond	48.5
Channing E. Phillips	67.5	David Hoeh	4
Daniel K. Moore	17.5	Edward M. Kennedy	3.5
Edward M. Kennedy	12.75	Eugene McCarthy	3.0
Paul W. "Bear" Bryant	1.5	Others	16.25
James H. Gray Sr.	0.5		
George Wallace	0.5		

== Richard J. Daley and the convention ==
Anti-war demonstrators in Lincoln Park, Chicago, attending a Yippie organized event approximately five miles (8.0 km) north of the convention center. The band MC5 can be seen playing.

The convention's host, Mayor Richard J. Daley of Chicago, intended to showcase his and the city's achievements to national Democrats and the news media. Instead, the proceedings became notorious for the large number of demonstrators and the use of force by the Chicago police during what was supposed to be, in the words of Yippie activist organizers, "A Festival of Life." Crowd control against the demonstrators by the Chicago Police Department and the Illinois National Guard devolved into a police riot. The disturbances were well publicized by the mass media, with some journalists and reporters being caught up in the violence. Network newsmen Dan Rather, Mike Wallace, and Edwin Newman were assaulted by the police while inside the convention hall.

=== Preparation ===
The Democratic National Convention had been held in Chicago twelve years earlier. Daley had played an integral role in the election of John F. Kennedy in 1960. In 1968, however, it did not seem that Daley had maintained the clout which would allow him to bring out the voters again to produce a Democratic victory as he had in 1960.

President Johnson had wanted the Democratic convention to be held in Houston, but Daley had successfully lobbied the president to hold it in Chicago to showcase to the national media Daley's successes in his fifteen years as mayor. On October 7, 1967, Daley and Johnson had a private meeting at a fund raiser for Johnson's re-election campaign, with an entry fee of one thousand dollars per plate (approximately $9,200 in 2025 dollars). During the meeting, Daley explained to the president that there had been a disappointing showing of Democrats in the 1966 congressional races, and the president might lose the swing state of Illinois with its 26 electoral votes if the convention were not held there. Johnson's pro-war policies had already created a great division within the party; he hoped that the selection of Chicago for the convention would eliminate further conflict with opposition. The DNC head for selecting the location was David Wilentz of New Jersey, who gave the official reason for choosing Chicago as, "It is centrally located geographically which will reduce transportation costs and because it has been the site of national conventions for both Parties in the past and is therefore attuned to holding them." The conversation between Johnson and Daley was leaked to the press and published in the Chicago Tribune and several other papers.

Daley ruled Chicago with a tight grip, and was determined to stop the protests which threatened to ruin his moment of triumph. In preparation, Daley had walls erected along the roads to the Amphitheatre through his own neighborhood of Bridgeport to obscure from sight rundown housing in the neighborhood.

=== Daley's fear of the protestors ===
Ten thousand demonstrators gathered in Chicago for the convention, where they were met by 23,000 police and National Guardsmen. When asked about anti-war demonstrators, Daley repeated to reporters that "no thousands will come to our city and take over our streets, our city, our convention".

Daley later said his primary reason for calling in so many Guardsmen and police was reports he received of plots to assassinate Democratic Party leaders including himself. One of Daley's aides told the media that the demonstrators were "revolutionaries bent on the destruction of America". When the media reported that Daley had given orders to the police to restrict the activities of Democratic delegates loyal to McCarthy, Daley gave an outraged press conference saying, "This is a vicious attack on this city and its mayor".

The leaders of the Yippies (Youth International Party), Abbie Hoffman and Jerry Rubin, specialized in outlandish, bizarre rhetoric to provoke media attention, and Daley took many of their outrageous threats seriously.

External videos
- CBS News 1968 Democratic National Convention Coverage, August 28, 1968, C-SPAN

=== Daley and the media ===
Daley's heavy-handed security measures incensed the media. Walter Cronkite complained of "a totally unwarranted restriction of free and rapid access to information". With the convention taking place days after the Warsaw Pact invasion of Czechoslovakia, Eric Sevareid stated that Chicago "runs the city of Prague a close second right now as the world's least attractive tourist destination".

On the second night of the convention, CBS News correspondent Dan Rather was grabbed by security guards and roughed up while trying to interview a Georgia delegate being escorted out of the building. CBS News anchorman Walter Cronkite turned his attention towards the area where Rather was reporting from the convention floor. Rather was grabbed by security guards after he walked toward the delegate who was being hauled out, and asked him, "What is your name, sir?" Rather was wearing a microphone headset and was then heard on national television repeatedly saying to the guards "don't push me" and "take your hands off me unless you plan to arrest me".

After the guards let go of Rather, he told Cronkite:

"Walter ... we tried to talk to the man and we got violently pushed out of the way. This is the kind of thing that has been going on outside the hall, this is the first time we've had it happen inside the hall. We ... I'm sorry to be out of breath, but somebody belted me in the stomach during that. What happened is a Georgia delegate, at least he had a Georgia delegate sign on, was being hauled out of the hall. We tried to talk to him to see why, who he was, what the situation was, and at that instant the security people, well as you can see, put me on the deck. I didn't do very well."

An angry Cronkite tersely replied, "I think we've got a bunch of thugs here, Dan."

On the last night, NBC News switched back and forth between images of the violence to the festivities over Humphrey's victory in the convention hall, highlighting the division in the Democratic Party.

=== "Gestapo tactics" Ribicoff incident ===
Daley's security measures were so intense that it was not possible to walk across the convention floor without jostling other delegates, which added to the tensions as Democrats fiercely argued about whether to accept Johnson's war plank to the platform. All of it was captured live on national television. 'Pro-war' Democrats challenged the presence of the economist John Kenneth Galbraith, who was serving as the floor manager for McCarthy, and sought to have him expelled. Inside the convention hall were televisions showing the police beating and clubbing demonstrators outside, which increased the tension. Robert Maytag, the chairman of the Colorado delegation asked: "Is there any rule under which Mayor Daley can be compelled to suspend the police state terror being perpetrated at this minute on kids in front of the Conrad Hilton [hotel]?" Daley's face flushed with anger while his supporters began to boo Maytag.

On the convention floor, Senator Abraham Ribicoff rose to give a speech nominating McGovern as the Democratic candidate. During his speech, Ribicoff pointed to Daley and said: "With George McGovern, we wouldn't have Gestapo tactics on the streets of Chicago," as raucous dissension broke out. Daley rose up to scream at Ribicoff (as interpreted by lip readers): "Fuck you, you Jew son of a bitch! You lousy motherfucker! Go home!" Ribicoff mildly replied: "How hard it is to accept the truth. How hard it is." Four of Daley's Chicago officials jumped up to usher Ribicoff away, helped by Daley's bodyguards.

Defenders of the mayor would later claim that he was calling Ribicoff a faker, a charge denied by Daley and refuted by Mike Royko's reporting.

=== Daley's response to convention demonstrations ===
Despite attempts to forestall such activity, there were numerous demonstrations on the floor throughout the convention by the disenchanted delegates that Daley was helpless to stop. The head of the Wisconsin delegation, Donald Peterson, spurred one such demonstration when he called at the end of Day 2 for the convention to adjourn until the next morning right before the Vietnam plank was to begin its debate. Daley and the convention chair Carl Albert attempted to resist and shut down the adjournment motion, but when the tired delegates rallied behind the motion, Daley would reverse his opposition and second the motion to adjourn, to which chairman Albert finally relented.

On the final day of the convention, a tribute video for Robert F. Kennedy was shown to the delegates and the home viewing audience. The tribute moved some delegates to tears and eventually the entire convention into song. The delegates sang “Battle Hymn of the Republic,” which was also sung at his widow Ethel's request at the end of his funeral. Chairman Albert attempted to continue with the convention, but his multiple requests for order in the convention were ignored. Daley also showed noticeable displeasure with the demonstration. The convention sang for over 10 minutes before Chicago alderman and future congressman Ralph Metcalfe was able to recapture the convention's attention to offer memoriam to Martin Luther King Jr.

== Protests and police response ==
Film shot by DASPO of the protests and Chicago police and military response to the protests

=== Preparations ===
In 1968, the Yippies and the National Mobilization Committee to End the War in Vietnam (MOBE) had already begun planning a youth festival in Chicago to coincide with the convention, and other groups such as the Students for a Democratic Society (SDS) would also make their presence known. Two SDS leaders, Tom Hayden and Rennie Davis, had planned to keep their protests peaceful, although the lack of permits and threats of violence by the Chicago police made this unlikely to happen. Todd Gitlin, another SDS leader, was highly worried about the potential for violence, and at a speech paraphrased a lyric from "San Francisco (Be Sure to Wear Flowers in Your Hair)", saying: "If you're going to Chicago, be sure to wear some armor in your hair".

Chicago mayor Daley thought that one way to prevent "anti-patriotic" demonstrators from coming to Chicago was to refuse to grant permits which would allow for people to protest legally. The mayor announced restrictions on how close protestors could approach the convention, on their numbers, and on their activities, making very clear his hostility to protesters in his city.

Over 10,000 people had arrived in Chicago to protest the Vietnam War. Daley had the International Amphitheatre, where the convention was being held, ringed with barbed wire while putting the 11,000 officers of the Chicago Police Department on twelve-hour shifts. In addition, there were 6,000 armed men from the Illinois National Guard called up to guard the International Amphitheatre, adding up to a total of 23,000 police and National Guardsmen. Intelligence agents had infiltrated among the protesters, including some from the Central Intelligence Agency, who – contrary to American law – had been sent to spy upon domestic politics. The Chicago police raided the mostly black neighborhoods of South Chicago to stage mass arrests of the Blackstone Rangers, a black power group that was allegedly planning to assassinate Humphrey.

=== Yippie publicity stunts ===
The leaders of the Yippies (Youth International Party), Abbie Hoffman and Jerry Rubin, attempted to provoke authorities by proclaiming: "We are dirty, smelly, grimy and foul...we will piss and shit and fuck in public...we will be constantly stoned or tripping on every drug known to man". Surrounded by reporters on August 23, 1968, Yippie leader Rubin, folk singer Phil Ochs, and other activists held their own convention with their candidate Pigasus, an actual pig. When the Yippies paraded Pigasus at the Civic Center, ten policemen arrested Ochs, Rubin, Pigasus, and six others, attracting media attention.

A peaceful demonstration was held in Lincoln Park led by Rubin and Hoffman, with the Yippie leaders calling the demonstrators to respect the 11 pm curfew. The Beatnik poet Allen Ginsberg ended the demonstration by chanting "Om". The next day was supposed to be the "Festival of Life" in Lincoln Park, but the police confiscated the truck upon which a rock band was to play. The demonstrators and police began shouting insults at each other while the police fired tear gas into the crowd and beat up the photographers and journalists present. Tom Hayden, one of the leaders of the SDS and co-organizer of the protests, was arrested.

The next day, what was billed as "Unbirthday Party" for President Johnson was planned to be held in Lincoln Park. Hayden, who had been freed on bail after his arrest the previous day, attended the "Unbirthday Party". He was recognized by a policeman, Constable Ralph Bell, who beat him and then arrested him for violating his bail conditions. Also attending the "Unbirthday Party" were Rubin and Bobby Seale of the Black Panther Party, who both called for "roasting pigs" in their speeches. In the evening, a demonstration was held at Grant Park opposite the Hilton Hotel, which was peaceful as bands such as Peter, Paul and Mary played folk music. When 600 Illinois National Guardsmen appeared, Hayden, who had been bailed out a second time, picked up his megaphone to shout that everybody should go home.

=== Riots ===
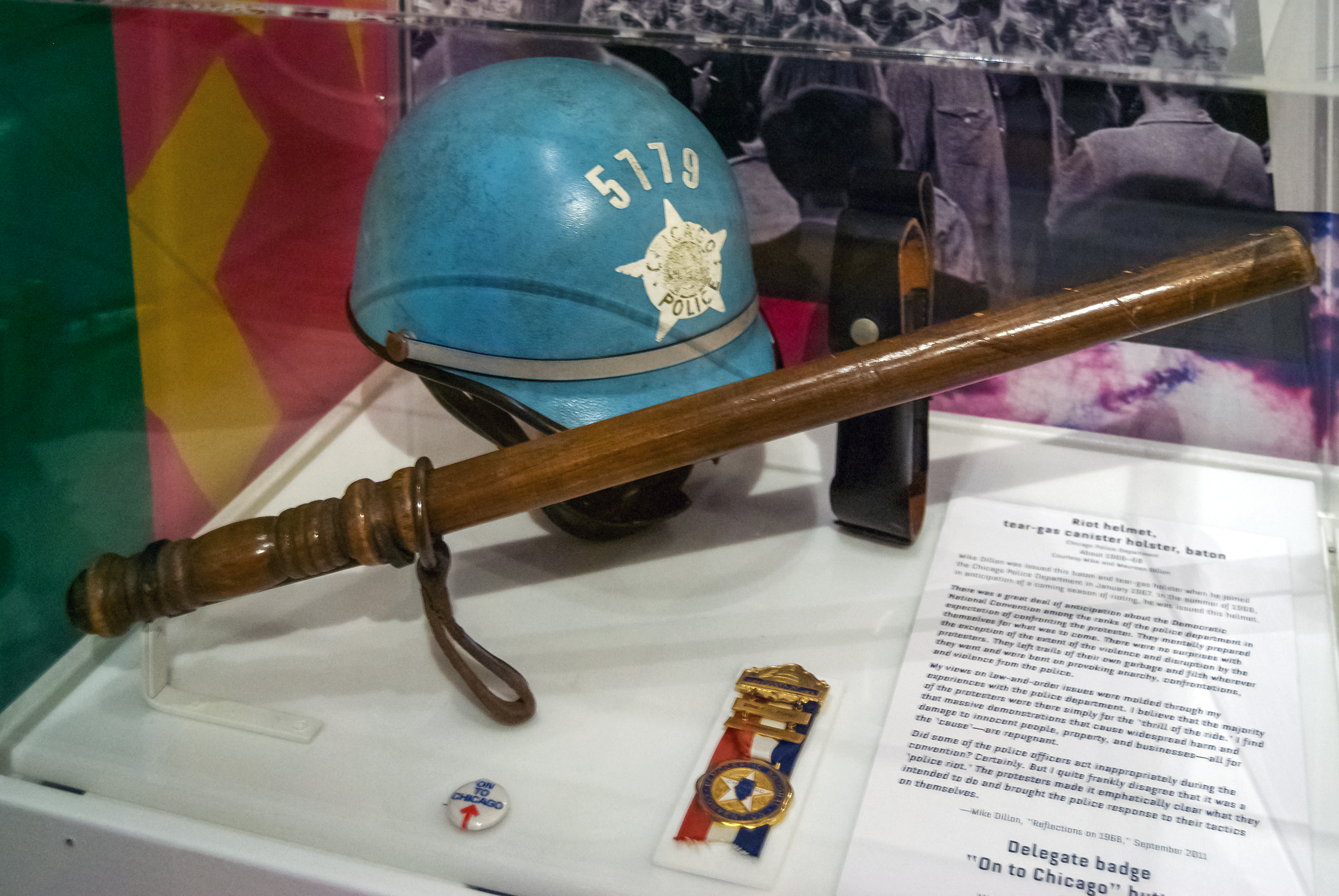
Chicago Police helmet and billy club circa 1968 (photographed 2012)

Chicago police drag an anti-Vietnam war protester across Michigan Avenue on August 28, 1968, as the crowd chants "The whole world is watching".

On August 28, 1968, around 10,000 protesters gathered in Grant Park for the demonstration, intending to march to the International Amphitheatre where the convention was being held. At approximately 3:30 pm, a young man lowered the American flag that was in the park. The police broke through the crowd and began beating the young man, while the crowd pelted the police with food, rocks, and chunks of concrete. The chants of some of the protesters shifted from, "Hell no, we won't go!" to, "Pigs are whores!"

Hayden encouraged protesters to move out of the park to ensure that if the police used tear gas on them, it would have to be done throughout the city. The police regained control of the situation after firing tear gas and chased the demonstrators down the streets, beating them with clubs and rifle butts and arresting them. The amount of tear gas used to suppress the protesters was so great that it made its way to the Conrad Hilton, where it disturbed Humphrey while in his shower. The police sprayed demonstrators and bystanders with mace and were taunted by some protesters with chants of, "Kill, kill, kill!" The police responded by shouting, "Get out of here, you cocksuckers!". Police indiscriminately attacked all who were present, regardless of if they were involved in the demonstrations or not. Dick Gregory, the comedian who attended the protests, told the crowd that the police were merely following the orders of Daley and "the crooks downtown".

The MOBE leaders then decided to march down Michigan Avenue to the Conrad Hilton hotel, where many of the Democratic delegates were staying. The Illinois National Guard guarding the hotel fired tear gas while the police moved in to beat the demonstrators. The police assault in front of the hotel during the evening of August 28 became the most famous image of the Chicago demonstrations of 1968, as the entire event took place live under television lights for seventeen minutes while the crowd chanted, "The whole world is watching". Samuel Brown, one of the organizers for Senator McCarthy, lamented the violence, saying: "Instead of nice young people ringing doorbells, the public saw the image of mobs shouting obscenities and disrupting the city". Brown stated the demonstrations at Chicago had been a disaster for the anti-war movement, as the American people saw the protesters as the trouble-makers and the heavy-handed police response as justified. The general feeling at the time was the hippies were intent upon destroying everything good in America and the Chicago police had acted correctly in beating such dangerous anti-social types bloody. In a telephone call to President Johnson on Saturday, September 7, 1968, Daley described some of the activity undertaken by elements of the protesters, which he described as "Professional Trouble Makers". These activities included the burning of the American Flag, raising of the Viet Cong flag and throwing both manure and urine at the police.

=== Aftermath ===
The Chicago Study Team (Walker Report) that investigated the violent clashes between police and protesters at the convention stated that the police response was characterized by:

unrestrained and indiscriminate police violence on many occasions, particularly at night. That violence was made all the more shocking by the fact that it was often inflicted upon persons who had broken no law, disobeyed no order, made no threat. These included peaceful demonstrators, onlookers, and large numbers of residents who were simply passing through, or happened to live in, the areas where confrontations were occurring.

The Walker Report, "headed by an independent observer from Los Angeles police – concluded that: 'Individual policemen, and lots of them, committed violent acts far in excess of the requisite force for crowd dispersal or arrest. To read dispassionately the hundreds of statements describing at firsthand the events of Sunday and Monday nights is to become convinced of the presence of what can only be called a police riot.'"

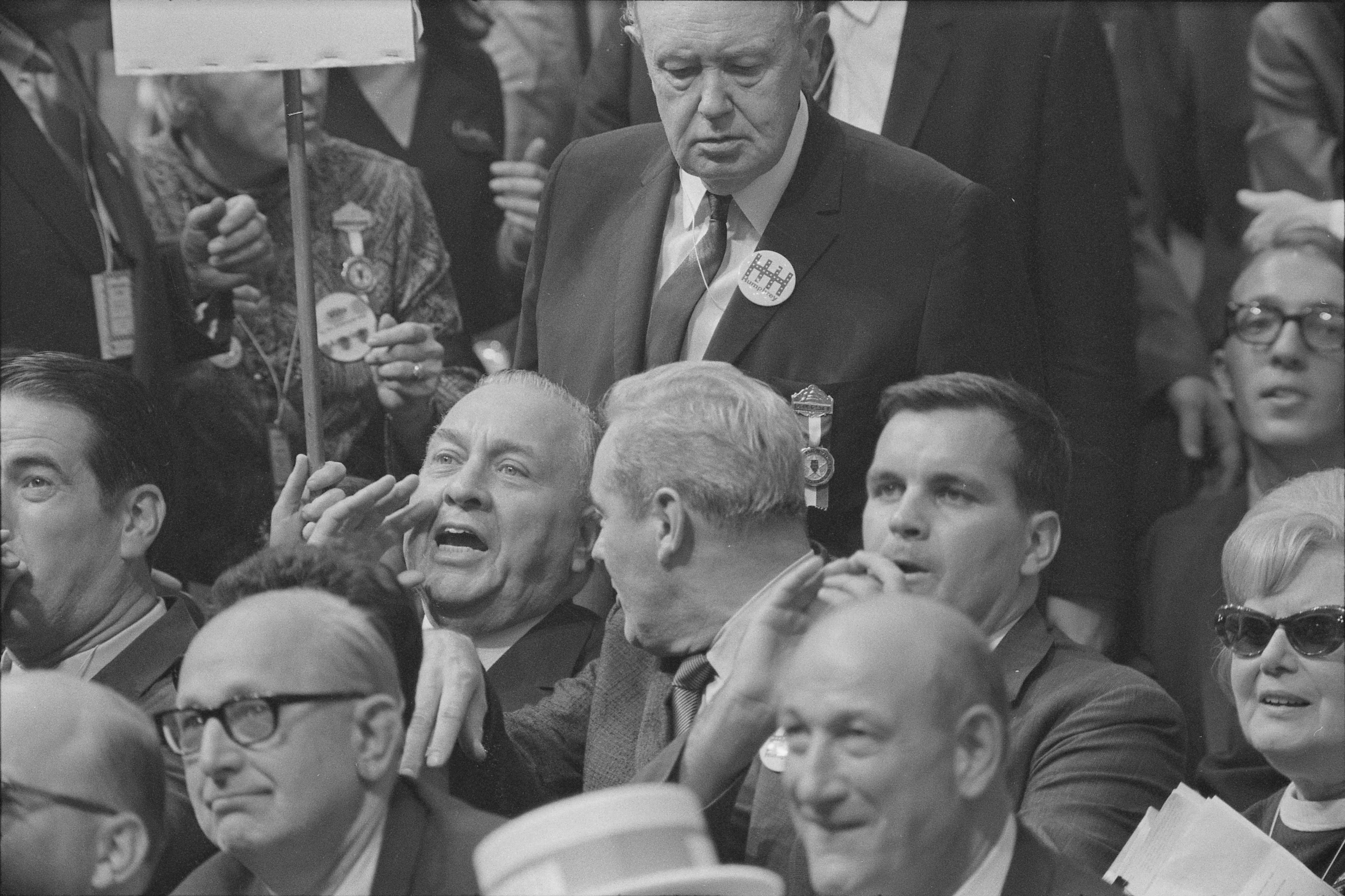
Illinois delegates (including then Mayor Richard J. Daley and his son future mayor Richard M. Daley) react to Senator Abraham Ribicoff's criticism of the Chicago Police. Reports differ as to whether the elder Daley shouted, "You faker!" or, "Fuck you, you Jew son of a bitch."

According to The Guardian, "[a]fter four days and nights of violence, 668 people had been arrested, 425 demonstrators were treated at temporary medical facilities, 200 were treated on the spot, 400 given first aid for tear gas exposure and 110 went to hospital. A total of 192 police officers were injured." Among the 668 people arrested, men outnumbered women almost eight to one, two-thirds of those arrested were ages 18 to 25, and over half lived within 40 miles of Chicago.

After the Chicago protests, some demonstrators believed the majority of Americans would side with them over what had happened in Chicago, especially because of police behavior. The controversy over the war in Vietnam overshadowed their cause. Daley shared he had received 135,000 letters supporting his actions and only 5,000 condemning them. Public opinion polls demonstrated that the majority of Americans supported the mayor's tactics. It was often commented through the popular media that on that evening, America decided to vote for Richard Nixon.

Phone call between President Lyndon B. Johnson and Richard Daley, August 29, 1968

After the convention, which had very publicly exposed the fault-lines between hawkish and dovish Democrats, Humphrey was 22 points behind Nixon in the polls. By contrast to the violence and chaos in Chicago, the Republican convention in Miami had been a model of order and unity, which made Nixon appear better qualified to be president as even Humphrey himself conceded in private.

On September 30, 1968, Humphrey gave a speech in Salt Lake City that he had intended to deliver at the convention in Chicago, saying he was willing to unconditionally stop the bombing of North Vietnam to break the deadlock in the peace talks in Paris. At this point, Humphrey, who was behind in the polls, saw his numbers began to rise; Nixon was certainly concerned in October 1968 that he might lose the election. By late October 1968, Humphrey had a slight lead with 44% intending to vote for him compared to 43% for Nixon. The election of 1968 was one of the closest ever in American history with Nixon winning 31.7 million votes, Humphrey 31.2 million votes and Wallace 10 million votes.

=== Chicago Seven ===
A grand jury charged eight defendants with conspiracy, crossing state lines with intent to incite a riot, and other federal crimes following the 1968 Democratic National Convention. The defendants became known as the Chicago Eight: Abbie Hoffman, Jerry Rubin, Tom Hayden, Bobby Seale, Rennie Davis, David Dellinger, John Froines, and Lee Weiner. During the trial, the case against Bobby Seale was declared a mistrial, and the Chicago Eight then became the Chicago Seven. Demonstrations were held daily during the trial, organized by the MOBE, the Young Lords led by Jose Cha Cha Jimenez, and the local Black Panther Party led by chairman Fred Hampton. In February 1970, five of the seven defendants were convicted of crossing state lines with intent to incite a riot, and all were acquitted of conspiracy. Froines and Weiner were acquitted on all charges.

While the jury was deliberating, Judge Julius Hoffman sentenced the defendants and their attorneys to jail terms ranging from 2 1/2 months to 4 years for contempt of court. In 1972, the convictions were reversed on appeal, and the government declined to bring the case to trial again.

== The McGovern–Fraser Commission ==
In response to the party disunity and electoral failure that came out of the convention, the party established the Commission on Party Structure and Delegate Selection (informally known as the McGovern–Fraser Commission), to examine current rules on the ways candidates were nominated and make recommendations designed to broaden participation and enable better representation for minorities and others who were underrepresented. The commission documented that in many places in America the Democratic Party was "an autocratic, authoritarian organization" that engaged in the "shameful exploitation of the voter".

The commission established more open procedures and affirmative action guidelines for selecting delegates. The changes imposed by the commission required that the number of delegates who were Black, women, Hispanic and between the ages of 18 and 30 reflected the proportion of the people in those groups in every congressional district. In addition the commission required all delegate selection procedures to be open; party leaders could no longer handpick the delegates in secret. The changes brought about by the commission ended the ability of local bosses who headed political machines such as Daley to ensure delegations that were subservient to them attended conventions. The rule changes brought by the commission also marked the beginning of the end of the Democratic delegations that were almost entirely male and usually entirely white, ensuring in the future Democratic delegations would be more diverse. An unforeseen result of these rules was a large shift toward state presidential primaries. Prior to the reforms, Democrats in two-thirds of the states used state conventions to choose convention delegates. In the post-reform era, over three-quarters of the states use primary elections to choose delegates, and over 80% of convention delegates are selected in these primaries.

== See also ==
- 1968 Democratic Party presidential primaries
- 1968 Republican National Convention
- 1968 United States presidential election
- History of the United States Democratic Party
- Hubert Humphrey 1968 presidential campaign
- List of Democratic National Conventions
- Protests of 1968
- Superdelegate, a Democratic Party delegate classification which originated following the 1968 national convention
- United States presidential nominating convention

Preceded by 1964; Atlantic City, New Jersey	Democratic National Conventions	Succeeded by 1972; Miami Beach, Florida
