= Julius Hoffman =

American judge (1895-1983)

Senior Judge of the United States District Court for the Northern District of Illinois
- In office February 3, 1972 – July 1, 1983

Judge of the United States District Court for the Northern District of Illinois
- In office May 14, 1953 – February 3, 1972
- Appointed by: Dwight D. Eisenhower
- Preceded by: Seat established
- Succeeded by: Richard Wellington McLaren

Personal details
- Born: Julius Jennings Hoffman; July 7, 1895 Chicago, Illinois, U.S.
- Died: July 1, 1983 (aged 87) Chicago, Illinois, U.S.
- Education: Illinois Institute of Technology; Northwestern University (BPhil, LLB)

Julius Jennings Hoffman (July 7, 1895 – July 1, 1983) was an American attorney and jurist who served as a United States district judge of the United States District Court for the Northern District of Illinois. He is most well known for presiding over the Chicago Seven trial, during which he showed bias against the defense, including by ordering Bobby Seale to be bound and gagged. His sentences against the defendants and their lawyers to jail terms for contempt were all later vacated or reversed on appeal.

== Early life and education ==
Hoffman was born in Chicago, Illinois, the son of Bertha (Weisberg) and Aaron Hoffman. His parents were Russian Jewish immigrants. Hoffman attended the Lewis Institute (now the Illinois Institute of Technology) and then received a Bachelor of Philosophy degree from Northwestern University at the age of sixteen in 1912. He received a Bachelor of Laws from Northwestern University School of Law in 1915.

== Career ==
Hoffman worked in the private practice of law in Chicago with the law firm of White and Hawxhurst from 1915 to 1936 and with the law firm of Markheim, Hoffman, Hungerford & Sollo from 1944 to 1947. He was general counsel for the Brunswick-Balke-Collender Company from 1936 to 1944. He was a Judge of the Superior Court of Cook County, Illinois from 1947 to 1953.

=== Federal judicial service ===
Hoffman was nominated by President Dwight D. Eisenhower on April 27, 1953, to the United States District Court for the Northern District of Illinois, to a new seat created by 64 Stat. 443. He was confirmed by the United States Senate on May 13, 1953, and received commission the next day. He assumed senior status on February 3, 1972. He served until his death on July 1, 1983, in Chicago.

==== Notable cases ====
Over the course of his career as a judge, Hoffman presided over numerous important cases, including a tax evasion case against Tony Accardo, an obscenity case against Lenny Bruce, a deportation suit against alleged Nazi war criminal Frank Walus, and several desegregation suits. Both the obscenity conviction and the conviction of Frank Walus were overturned, with the courts citing Hoffman’s overzealous nature as the reason in both cases.

His reading of federal statute was notably overturned in the Supreme Court decision Hoffman v. Blaski, 363 U.S. 335 (1960), which limited the scope of federal transfer of venue under 28 U.S.C. §1404(a).

==== Chicago Seven ====
Hoffman's most notable case was the trial from April 9, 1969, to February 20, 1970, that involved charges against protesters arrested during the 1968 Democratic Convention, originally known as the "Chicago Eight". During the course of the Chicago Eight trial, Hoffman refused to allow the defendant Bobby Seale to represent himself after Seale's original attorney became ill. This prompted conflicts with Seale that led to Hoffman ordering Seale to be gagged and shackled in the courtroom and eventually jailed for contempt. Finally, Hoffman removed Seale from the trial, leaving the case with only seven defendants, at which point the trial became known as the "Chicago Seven" trial. Because of this, and his non-objective attitude, Hoffman became the favorite courtroom target of the Chicago Seven defendants, who often openly insulted the judge. Abbie Hoffman (no direct relation) told Judge Hoffman "you are a shande far dee Goyim" ["a disgrace (to the Jewish community) in front of the Gentiles" in Yiddish] and that "[y]ou would have served Hitler better." He later added that "your idea of justice is the only obscenity in the room." Both Rennie Davis and Jerry Rubin told the judge, "This court is bullshit."

All seven were found by a jury to be not guilty of conspiracy, but five of the defendants were found guilty of inciting a riot, and Hoffman sentenced each of the five to the maximum penalty: five years in prison and a fine of $5,000, plus court costs. In addition, Hoffman sentenced all eight defendants and both of their lawyers (William Kunstler and Leonard Weinglass) to lengthy jail terms for contempt of court.

On May 11, 1972, the United States Court of Appeals for the Seventh Circuit vacated all of the contempt convictions, and on November 21, 1972, reversed all of the substantive convictions on a number of grounds. Among other things, the appeals court found that Hoffman had not sufficiently measured the biases of the jury and that he had exhibited a "deprecatory and often antagonistic attitude toward the defense."

== Later life ==
In 1974, author Joseph Goulden wrote a book called The Benchwarmers, which was an exposé of the powerful and often private world of federal judges. Goulden conducted an in-depth investigation of Hoffman and pointed out that he had an abrasive reputation among Chicago lawyers even before his most famous case. Goulden mentioned a survey that had been done among Chicago attorneys who had recently appeared before the judge and 78% had an unfavorable opinion of him. They responded overwhelmingly negatively to the questions, "Does he display an impartial attitude?" and "Is he courteous to both the prosecution and defense?"

In 1982, the Executive Committee of the United States District Court ordered that Hoffman not be assigned any new cases because of his age and complaints that he was acting erratically and abusively from the bench. However, he continued to preside over his existing ongoing cases until his death from natural causes the next year, a week before his 88th birthday.

== In popular culture ==
- David Opatoshu portrayed Hoffman in the 1987 TV docudrama Conspiracy: The Trial of the Chicago 8.
- Roy Scheider played him in the 2007 animated documentary Chicago 10.
- Philip Baker Hall portrayed him in the 2010 film The Chicago 8.
- Frank Langella played him in the 2020 film The Trial of the Chicago 7.
- John Prine mentioned him in the third verse of his song "Illegal Smile", from his self-titled debut album.

== See also ==
- List of Jewish American jurists

Legal offices
New seat	Judge of the United States District Court for the Northern District of Illinois; 1953–1972	Succeeded by Richard Wellington McLaren
