= Frank Condon =

American dramatist

Frank Condon, MA, MFA, (b. Derbyshire, England, 1943) is a playwright and theatrical production director, the founding Artistic Director of River Stage, in Sacramento, California, and a professor of theatre at Cosumnes River College. Condon is best known for bringing controversial plays to the theatre.

== Early life and education ==
Condon immigrated to the United States from the United Kingdom with his family when he was eight. After graduating from high school, he joined the United States Army. "I went in as a ‘gung-ho’ young man, and I came out as a disenchanted, angry, more mature young man", he later said. He then went on to study theatre at the University of California, Santa Barbara, where he earned bachelor's and master's degrees, after which he taught theater at Santa Barbara High School for four years. Condon then moved on to San Diego, where he earned a master of fine arts degree in directing at the University of California, San Diego.

== Career ==
Condon teamed up with writer and producer Ron Sossi in 1979 to create The Chicago Conspiracy Trial, which is based on testimony at the famous trial after the 1968 Democratic convention. It ran for fourteen months and won numerous awards.

He has worked with Garry Trudeau, of Doonesbury fame, on the highly successful runs of Trudeau’s Rap Master Ronnie, which he directed in Los Angeles, San Diego, San Francisco, Seattle and Toronto. The play poked fun at then-President Ronald Reagan, in an attempt at capturing the essence of Reagan's Teflon presidency by means of a satirically portraying the television character Max Headroom.

As an artistic director for the Odyssey Theatre in Los Angeles, he directed several highly successful productions of new plays and helped create the Odyssey's international reputation for theatre. Condon directed the original production of McCarthy at the Odyssey Theatre and the original production of Mark Medoff’s The Majestic Kid at the Denver Center Theatre Company.

He has been affiliated with a number of theatre schools, including the American Academy of Dramatic Arts, the Dell'Arte School of Comedy, the University of California, Los Angeles, and the University of Southern California. He has been the staff director at the Mark Taper Forum, a guest director for several major regional theatres and the director for a number of inaugural productions to open theatres. He was invited by Luis Valdez to direct the first play in El Teatro Campesino's home theatre in San Juan Bautista.

In 1994, in the wake of the devastating Northridge earthquake, Condon left Southern California with his family to take an opportunity at Cosumnes River College to found a new theatre, River Stage, rather than inheriting an existing stage beset by someone else's "headaches".

Condon is one of the founders of The League of Sacramento Theatres, a member of the Stage Directors and Choreographers Society and the Dramatists Guild.

== Recognition ==
The Chicago Conspiracy Trial, co-written and directed by Condon, received five LA Drama Critics’ Awards. Condon has received the Sacramento Mayor and County Supervisors' Fellowship Award from the Sacramento Metropolitan Arts Commission for "A lifetime contribution to the field on a national level." He has received numerous other honors including a National Endowment for the Arts director's fellowship and Los Angeles Drama Critics Circle Awards for both directing and playwriting.
