= List of non-fiction works made into feature films =

This is a list of nonfiction works that have been made into feature films. The title of the work is followed by the work's author, the title of the film, and the year of the film. If a film has an alternate title based on geographical distribution, the title listed will be that of the widest distribution area.

The list does not include documentary films that are based on real events and people which are not based chiefly on a written work. For other documentary film categories, see documentaries.

== Books ==
Non-fiction work(s)	Film adaptation(s)	Ref.
13 Hours (2014), Mitchell Zuckoff	13 Hours: The Secret Soldiers of Benghazi (2016)	
The Accidental Billionaires (2009), Ben Mezrich	The Social Network (2010)	
Across the Wide Missouri (1947), Bernard DeVoto	Across the Wide Missouri (1951)	
Air America (1985), Christopher Robbins	Air America (1990)	
Alive: The Story of the Andes Survivors (1974), Piers Paul Read	Alive: The Miracle of the Andes (1993)	
All the President's Men (1974), Bob Woodward and Carl Bernstein	All the President's Men (1976)	
American Prometheus: The Triumph and Tragedy of J. Robert Oppenheimer (2005), Kai Bird and Martin J. Sherwin	Oppenheimer (2023)	
An Anthropologist on Mars (1995), Oliver Sacks	At First Sight (1999)	
An Anthropologist on Mars (1995), Oliver Sacks	The Music Never Stopped (2011)	
And the Band Played On (1987), Randy Shilts	And the Band Played On (1993)	
Awakenings (1973), Oliver Sacks	Awakenings (1990)	
The Big Short (2010), Michael Lewis	The Big Short (2015)	
Black Hawk Down (1999), Mark Bowden	Black Hawk Down (2001)	
A Brief History of Time (1988), Stephen Hawking	A Brief History of Time (1991)	
Bringing Down the House (2003), Ben Mezrich	The Last Casino (2004)	
Bringing Down the House (2003), Ben Mezrich	21 (2008)	
The Broken Seal: "Operation Magic" and the Secret Road to Pearl Harbor (1967), Ladislas Farago	Tora! Tora! Tora! (1970)	
Bully: A True Story of High School Revenge (1998), Jim Schutze	Bully (2001)	
Casino: Love and Honor in Las Vegas (1995), Nicholas Pileggi	Casino (1995)	
Charlie Wilson's War: The Extraordinary Story of the Largest Covert Operation in History (2003), George Crile III	Charlie Wilson's War (2007)	
A Civil Action (1996), Jonathan Harr	A Civil Action (1998)	
Class Action: The Story of Lois Jenson and the Landmark Case That Changed Sexual Harassment Law (2002), Clara Bingham and Laura Leedy Gansler	North Country (2005)	
The Conquest of Space (1949), Chesley Bonestell & Willy Ley	Conquest of Space (1955)	
The Dam Busters (1951), Paul Brickhill	The Dam Busters (1954)	
The Day the World Ended (1969), Gordon Thomas and Max Morgan-Witts	When Time Ran Out (1980)	
Dead Man Walking (1993), Sister Helen Prejean	Dead Man Walking (1995)	
Dispatches (1977), Michael Herr	Apocalypse Now (1979)	
Dispatches (1977), Michael Herr	Full Metal Jacket (1987)	
Dylan Goes Electric! Newport, Seeger, Dylan, and the Night That Split the Sixties (2015), Elijah Wald	A Complete Unknown (2024)	
Escape from Alcatraz (1963), J. Campbell Bruce	Escape from Alcatraz (1979)	
The Execution of Charles Horman: An American Sacrifice (1978), Thomas Hauser	Missing (1982)	
The Falcon and the Snowman: A True Story of Friendship and Espionage (1979), Robert Lindsey	The Falcon and the Snowman (1985)	
Fast Food Nation (2001), Eric Schlosser	Fast Food Nation (2006)	
The Final Days (1976), Bob Woodward and Carl Bernstein	The Final Days (1989)	
Fire in the Valley: The Making of the Personal Computer (1984), Paul Freiberger and Michael Swaine	Pirates of Silicon Valley (1999) (TV)	
The Flight of Dragons (1979), Peter Dickinson	The Flight of Dragons (1982) (TV)	
Follow the Rabbit-Proof Fence (1996), Doris Pilkington Garimara	Rabbit-Proof Fence (2002)	
Freeing the Whales (1989), Tom Rose	Big Miracle (2012)	
The French Connection (1969), Robin Moore	The French Connection (1971)	
Friday Night Lights: A Town, a Team and a Dream (1990), H. G. Bissinger	Friday Night Lights (2004)	
The Game of Their Lives: The Untold Story of the World Cup's Biggest Upset (1996), Geoffrey Douglas	The Game of Their Lives (2005)	
The Gangs of New York: An Informal History of the Underworld (1928), Herbert Asbury	Gangs of New York (2002)	
The Hindenburg (1972), Michael M. Mooney	The Hindenburg (1975)	
Homicide: A Year on the Killing Streets (1991), David Simon	Homicide: The Movie (2000) (TV)	
In Cold Blood (1966), Truman Capote	In Cold Blood (1967)	
Imperial Life in the Emerald City (2006), Rajiv Chandrasekaran	Green Zone (2010)	
Into the Wild (1996), Jon Krakauer	Into the Wild (2007)	
Killers of the Flower Moon (2017), David Grann	Killers of the Flower Moon (2023)	
The Last Days of Patton (1981), Ladislas Farago	The Last Days of Patton (1986) (TV)	
Lazarus and the Hurricane: The Freeing of Rubin "Hurricane" Carter (1991), Sam Chaiton and Terry Swinton	The Hurricane (1999)	
The Longest Day (1959), Cornelius Ryan	The Longest Day (1962)	
Lost Moon (1994), Jim Lovell and Jeffrey Kluger	Apollo 13 (1995)	
The Man Who Never Was (1954), Ewen Montagu	The Man Who Never Was (1956)	
The Mars Project (1952), Wernher von Braun	Conquest of Space (1955)	
The Men Who Stare at Goats (2004), Jon Ronson	The Men Who Stare at Goats (2009)	
Midnight in the Garden of Good and Evil (1994), John Berendt	Midnight in the Garden of Good and Evil (1997)	
Moneyball (2003), Michael Lewis	Moneyball (2011)	
The Monuments Men: Allied Heroes, Nazi Thieves and the Greatest Treasure Hunt in History (2007), Robert M. Edsel and Bret Witter	The Monuments Men (2014)	
The Mountain Road (1958), Theodore H. White	The Mountain Road (1961)	
The Mothman Prophecies (1975), John Keel	The Mothman Prophecies (2002)	
A Night to Remember (1955), Walter Lord	A Night to Remember (1958)	
Nomadland (2017), Jessica Bruder	Nomadland (2020)	
Ondskan (The Evil) (1981), Jan Guillou	Evil (2003)	
The One That Got Away (1956), Kendall Burt and James Leasor	The One That Got Away (1957)	
The Onion Field (1973), Joseph Wambaugh	The Onion Field (1979)	
The Orchid Thief (1998), Susan Orlean	Adaptation. (2002)	
Patton: Ordeal and Triumph (1963), Ladislas Farago	Patton (1970)	
The Perfect Storm (1997), Sebastian Junger	The Perfect Storm (2000)	
Pork Chop Hill: The American Fighting Man in Action, Korea, Spring, 1953 (1956), S. L. A. Marshall	Pork Chop Hill (1959)	
Prince of the City: The True Story of a Cop Who Knew Too Much (1978), Robert Daley	Prince of the City (1981)	
The Rite: The Making of a Modern Exorcist (2009), Matt Baglio	The Rite (2011)	
The Saga of Billy the Kid (1925), Walter Noble Burns	Billy the Kid (1930)	
The Saga of Billy the Kid (1925), Walter Noble Burns	Billy the Kid (1941)	
The Saga of Billy the Kid (1925), Walter Noble Burns	The Outlaw (1943)	
The Saga of Billy the Kid (1925), Walter Noble Burns	The Left Handed Gun (1958)	
The Saga of Billy the Kid (1925), Walter Noble Burns	Pat Garrett and Billy the Kid (1973)	
The Saga of Billy the Kid (1925), Walter Noble Burns	Gore Vidal's Billy the Kid (1989) (TV)	
The Sea Around Us (1951), Rachel Carson	The Sea Around Us (1953)	
A Season on the Brink (1986), John Feinstein	A Season on the Brink (2002)	
The Secret Life of Plants (1973), Peter Tompkins and Christopher Bird	The Secret Life of Plants (1979)	
The Serpent and the Rainbow (1985), Wade Davis	The Serpent and the Rainbow (1988)	
The Smartest Guys in the Room (2003), Bethany McLean and Peter Elkind	Enron: The Smartest Guys in the Room (2005)	
The Story of Mankind (1921), Hendrik Willem van Loon	The Story of Mankind (1957)	
Storyville, New Orleans (1974), Al Rose	Pretty Baby (1978)	
Ten Days that Shook the World (1919), John Reed	October: Ten Days That Shook the World (1928)	
Ten Days that Shook the World (1919), John Reed	Reds (1981)	
Ten Days that Shook the World (1919), John Reed	Red Bells (1982)	
Ten Rillington Place (1961), Ludovic Kennedy	10 Rillington Place (1971)	
The Three Faces of Eve (1957), Corbett H. Thigpen and Hervey M. Cleckley	The Three Faces of Eve (1957)	
True Blue: The Oxford Boat Race Mutiny (1987), Daniel Topolski	True Blue (1996)	
The True Story of Christopher Emmanuel Balestrero, Maxwell Anderson	The Wrong Man (1956)	
The Turning Point (1982), Fritjof Capra	Mindwalk (1990)	
Twelve Days of Terror (2001), Richard G. Fernicola	12 Days of Terror (2004)	
Voyage of the Damned (1974), Gordon Thomas and Max Morgan-Witts	Voyage of the Damned (1976)	
We Were Soldiers Once... And Young (1992), Harold G. Moore and Joseph L. Galloway	We Were Soldiers (2002)	
Zodiac (1986), Robert Graysmith	Zodiac (2007)	

=== Biographies ===
Book	Subject	Film adaptation(s)	Ref.
Abbie Hoffman: American Rebel (1982), Marty Jezer	Abbie Hoffman	Steal This Movie! (2000)	
The Agony and the Ecstasy (1961), Irving Stone	Michelangelo	The Agony and the Ecstasy (1965)	
Aimée & Jaguar. Eine Liebesgeschichte, Berlin 1943 (1994), Erica Fischer	Lilly Wust and Felice Schragenheim	Aimée & Jaguar (1999)	
Blow: How a Small- Town Boy Made $100 Million With the Medellin Cocaine Cartel and Lost It All (1993), Bruce Porter	George Jung	Blow (2001)	
Camille Claudel: 1864-1943 (1988), Reine-Marie Paris	Camille Claudel	Camille Claudel (1988)	
Carve Her Name with Pride (1956), R.J. Minney	Violette Szabo	Carve Her Name with Pride (1958)	
Chaplin: His Life and Art (1985), David Robinson	Charles Chaplin	Chaplin (1992)	
Diamond Jim Brady (1933), Parker Morrell	Diamond Jim Brady	Diamond Jim (1935)	
Frida: A Biography of Frida Kahlo (1983), Hayden Herrera	Frida Kahlo	Frida (2002)	
The General (1995), Paul Williams	Martin Cahill	The General (1998)	
The Great Impostor (1959), Robert Crichton	Ferdinand Waldo Demara	The Great Impostor (1961)	
The Honest Courtesan (1992), Margaret Rosenthal	Veronica Franco	Dangerous Beauty (1998)	
Jackson Pollock: An American Saga (1989), Steven Naifeh and Gregory White Smith	Jackson Pollock	Pollock (2000)	
Joe Gould's Secret (1965), Joseph Mitchell	Joe Gould	Joe Gould's Secret (2000)	
Inside Hitler's Bunker (2002), Joachim Fest	Adolf Hitler	Der Untergang (Downfall) (2004)	
The Life and Times of Cleopatra (1958), by Charles Marie Franzero	Cleopatra	Cleopatra (1963)	
Magic Fire: The Story of Wagner's Life and Music (1954), Bertita Harding	Richard Wagner	Magic Fire (1954)	
The Man Who Was Peter Pan (1998 play), Allan Knee	J. M. Barrie	Finding Neverland (2004)	
Marie Antoinette: The Journey (2001), Antonia Fraser	Marie Antoinette	Marie Antoinette (2006)	
Our Sunshine (1991), Robert Drewe	Ned Kelly	Ned Kelly (2003)	
Phantom Crown: The Story of Maximilian & Carlota of Mexico (1934), Bertita Harding	Maximilian I of Mexico and Charlotte of Belgium	Juarez (1939)	
Savage Messiah (1931), H. S. Ede	Henri Gaudier-Brzeska	Savage Messiah (1972)	
Seabiscuit: An American Legend (1999), Laura Hillenbrand	Seabiscuit	Seabiscuit (2003)	
Stung: The Incredible Obsession of Brian Molony (2002), Gary Stephen Ross	Brian Molony	Owning Mahowny (2003)	
Triumph Over Pain (1940), René Fülöp-Miller	William T. G. Morton	The Great Moment (1944)	
Truman (1992), David McCullough	Harry S. Truman	Truman (1995)	
Truman Capote: In Which Various Friends, Enemies, Acquaintances, and Detractors Recall His Turbulent Career (1997), George Plimpton	Truman Capote	Infamous (2006)	
Viva Villa! (1933), Edgecumb Pinchon & Odo B. Stade	Pancho Villa	Viva Villa! (1934)	
Wallace: The Classic Portrait of Alabama Governor George Wallace (1968), Marshall Frady	George Wallace	George Wallace (1997)	
The White Rabbit (1952), Bruce Marshall	F. F. E. Yeo-Thomas	The White Rabbit (1967) (TV) (mini)	
The Wild Boy of Aveyron (1802), Jean Marc Gaspard Itard	Victor of Aveyron	The Wild Child (French: L'Enfant Sauvage) (1970)	
Wired: The Short Life and Fast Times of John Belushi (1984), Bob Woodward	John Belushi	Wired (1989)	
Wiseguy (1985), Nicholas Pileggi	Henry Hill	Goodfellas (1990)	

=== Autobiographies and memoirs ===
Book	Film adaptation(s)
84, Charing Cross Road (1970), Helene Hanff	84 Charing Cross Road (1987)
Act One (1959), Moss Hart	Act One (1963)
Adolf Hitler: My Part in His Downfall (1971), Spike Milligan	Adolf Hitler: My Part in His Downfall (1972)
American Sniper (2012), Chris Kyle	American Sniper (2014)
Angela's Ashes (1996), Frank McCourt	Angela's Ashes (1999)
Another Bullshit Night in Suck City (2004), Nick Flynn	Being Flynn (2012)
The Autobiography of Malcolm X (1965), Malcolm X and Alex Haley	Malcolm X (1992)
The Basketball Diaries (1978), Jim Carroll	The Basketball Diaries (1995)
Before Night Falls (1992), Reinaldo Arenas	Before Night Falls (2000)
Belles on Their Toes (1950), Frank Bunker Gilbreth, Jr. and Ernestine Gilbreth Carey	Belles on Their Toes (1952)
Between a Rock and a Hard Place (2004), Aron Ralston	127 Hours (2010)
Born on the Fourth of July (1976), Ron Kovic	Born on the Fourth of July (1989)
Bound for Glory (1943), Woody Guthrie	Bound for Glory (1976)
Bravo Two Zero (1993), Andy McNab	Bravo Two Zero (1999)
Breaking the Surface (1996), Greg Louganis	Breaking the Surface: The Greg Louganis Story (1997) (TV)
Cash: The Autobiography (1997), Johnny Cash	Walk the Line (2005)
Castaway (1983), Lucy Irvine	Castaway (1986)
Catch Me If You Can (1980), Frank Abagnale	Catch Me If You Can (2002)
Cheaper by the Dozen (1948), Frank Bunker Gilbreth, Jr. and Ernestine Gilbreth Carey	Cheaper by the Dozen (1950)
Cheaper by the Dozen (1948), Frank Bunker Gilbreth, Jr. and Ernestine Gilbreth Carey	Cheaper by the Dozen (2003)
Chopper (1991–2011) (series), Mark Brandon Read	Chopper (2000)
Crazy (1999), Benjamin Lebert	Crazy (2000)
Day of the Stranger (1989), Novalyne Price Ellis	The Whole Wide World (1996)
The Devil's Double (2003), Latif Yahia	The Devil's Double (2011)
The Devil's Workshop (Czech: Komando padělatelů) (1983), Adolf Burger	The Counterfeiters (2007)
A Diary of A Demonstrator (1983), Soe Hok Gie	Gie (2005)
The Diary of a Young Girl (Dutch: Het Achterhuis: Dagboekbrieven van 12 Juni 1942 – 1 Augustus 1944, The Annex: Diary Notes from 12 June 1942 – 1 August 1944) (1947), Anne Frank	The Diary of Anne Frank (1959)
The Diary of a Young Girl (Dutch: Het Achterhuis: Dagboekbrieven van 12 Juni 1942 – 1 Augustus 1944, The Annex: Diary Notes from 12 June 1942 – 1 August 1944) (1947), Anne Frank	Diary of Anne Frank (Dutch: Dagboek van Anne Frank) (1962) (TV)
The Diary of a Young Girl (Dutch: Het Achterhuis: Dagboekbrieven van 12 Juni 1942 – 1 Augustus 1944, The Annex: Diary Notes from 12 June 1942 – 1 August 1944) (1947), Anne Frank	The Diary of Anne Frank (1967) (TV)
The Diary of a Young Girl (Dutch: Het Achterhuis: Dagboekbrieven van 12 Juni 1942 – 1 Augustus 1944, The Annex: Diary Notes from 12 June 1942 – 1 August 1944) (1947), Anne Frank	Anne no Nikki: Anne Frank Monogatari (アンネの日記 アンネ·フランク物語, Anne no nikki: Anne Furanku monogatari) (1979) (TV)
The Diary of a Young Girl (Dutch: Het Achterhuis: Dagboekbrieven van 12 Juni 1942 – 1 Augustus 1944, The Annex: Diary Notes from 12 June 1942 – 1 August 1944) (1947), Anne Frank	The Diary of Anne Frank (1980) (TV)
The Diary of a Young Girl (Dutch: Het Achterhuis: Dagboekbrieven van 12 Juni 1942 – 1 Augustus 1944, The Annex: Diary Notes from 12 June 1942 – 1 August 1944) (1947), Anne Frank	The Diary of Anne Frank (Dutch: Het dagboek van Anne Frank) (1985)
The Diary of a Young Girl (Dutch: Het Achterhuis: Dagboekbrieven van 12 Juni 1942 – 1 Augustus 1944, The Annex: Diary Notes from 12 June 1942 – 1 August 1944) (1947), Anne Frank	Anne no nikki (アンネの日記) (1995)
The Diary of a Young Girl (Dutch: Het Achterhuis: Dagboekbrieven van 12 Juni 1942 – 1 Augustus 1944, The Annex: Diary Notes from 12 June 1942 – 1 August 1944) (1947), Anne Frank	Anne Frank: The Whole Story (2001) (TV) (mini)
The Diary of a Young Girl (Dutch: Het Achterhuis: Dagboekbrieven van 12 Juni 1942 – 1 Augustus 1944, The Annex: Diary Notes from 12 June 1942 – 1 August 1944) (1947), Anne Frank	The Diary of Anne Frank (German: Das Tagebuch der Anne Frank) (2016)
The Diary of a Young Girl (Dutch: Het Achterhuis: Dagboekbrieven van 12 Juni 1942 – 1 Augustus 1944, The Annex: Diary Notes from 12 June 1942 – 1 August 1944) (1947), Anne Frank	Where Is Anne Frank (2021)
The Disaster Artist (2013), Greg Sestero and Tom Bissell	The Disaster Artist (2017)
Donnie Brasco: My Undercover Life in the Mafia (1988), Joseph D. Pistone	Donnie Brasco (1997)
Don't Worry, He Won't Get Far on Foot: The Autobiography of a Dangerous Man (1989), John Callahan	Don't Worry, He Won't Get Far on Foot (2018)
Elegy for Iris (1999), John Bayley	Iris (2001)
Enemy Coast Ahead (1946), Guy Gibson	The Dam Busters (1954)
Carandiru Station (Portuguese: Estação Carandiru) (2001), Drauzio Varella	Carandiru (2003)
Fair Game (2007), Valerie Plame	Fair Game (2010)
Finding Fish (2001), Antwone Quenton Fisher	Antwone Fisher (2002)
Gifted Hands: The Ben Carson Story (1990), Ben Carson	Gifted Hands: The Ben Carson Story (2009) (TV)
Girl, Interrupted (1993), Susanna Kaysen	Girl, Interrupted (1999)
A Gloomy Soliloquy (1946), Olavi Paavolainen	Sign of the Beast (1981)
Gorillas in the Mist (1983), Dian Fossey	Gorillas in the Mist (1988)
Growing Up Brady: I Was a Teenage Greg (1992), Barry Williams	Growing Up Brady (2000) (TV)
Gypsy: A Memoir, Gypsy Rose Lee	Gypsy (1962)
Gypsy: A Memoir, Gypsy Rose Lee	Gypsy (1993) (TV)
Hard Sell: The Evolution of a Viagra Salesman (2005), Jamie Reidy	Love & Other Drugs (2010)
Hideous Kinky (1992), Esther Freud	Hideous Kinky (1998)
Highest Duty (2009), Sully Sullenberger	Sully (2016)
How to Lose Friends & Alienate People (2001), Toby Young	How to Lose Friends & Alienate People (2008)
I Am a Fugitive from a Georgia Chain Gang! (1932), Robert Elliott Burns	I Am a Fugitive from a Chain Gang (1932)
I Know Why the Caged Bird Sings (1969), Maya Angelou	I Know Why the Caged Bird Sings (1979) (TV)
I, Tina (1986), Tina Turner	What's Love Got to Do with It (1993)
I Was Hitler Youth Salomon (German: Ich war Hitlerjunge Salomon) (1990), Solomon Perel	Europa Europa (1990)
I'll Cry Tomorrow (1954), Lillian Roth	I'll Cry Tomorrow (1955)
Iron & Silk (1986), Mark Salzman	Iron & Silk (1990)
Jarhead (2003), Anthony Swofford	Jarhead (2005)
Julie & Julia: 365 Days, 524 Recipes, 1 Tiny Apartment Kitchen (2005), Julie Powell	Julie & Julia (2009)
Lady Sings the Blues (1956), Billie Holiday	Lady Sings the Blues (1972)
The Learning Tree (1964), Gordon Parks	The Learning Tree (1969)
Leaving Las Vegas (1990), John O'Brien	Leaving Las Vegas (1995)
Life Is Not a Fairy Tale (2005), Fantasia Barrino	Life Is Not a Fairy Tale: The Fantasia Barrino Story (2006) (TV)
Listen to the Voices of the Sea (日本戦歿学生の手記 きけ、わだつみの声, Nippon senbotsu gakusei no shuki: Kike wadatsumi no koe) (1949), Elyesa Bazna	Listen to the Voices of the Sea (1950)
Live from Baghdad (1991), Robert Wiener	Live from Baghdad (2002)
Lone Survivor (2007), Marcus Lutrell	Lone Survivor (2013)
The Man-eaters of Tsavo (1907), John Henry Patterson	Bwana Devil (1952)
The Man-eaters of Tsavo (1907), John Henry Patterson	The Ghost and the Darkness (1996)
Man in Black: His Own Story in His Own Words (1975), Johnny Cash	Walk the Line (2005)
Marley & Me (2005), John Grogan	Marley & Me (2008)
Midnight Express (1977), Billy Hayes	Midnight Express (1978)
A Mighty Heart (2003), Mariane Pearl	A Mighty Heart (2007)
Mommie Dearest (1978), Christina Crawford	Mommie Dearest (1981)
The Motorcycle Diaries (Spanish: Diarios de motocicleta) (1995), Che Guevara	The Motorcycle Diaries (2004)
Mr. Nice (1996), Howard Marks	Mr Nice (2010)
Murder, Inc. (1951), Burton Turkus	Murder, Inc. (1960)
My Autobiography (1964), Charlie Chaplin	Chaplin (1992)
My Dog Skip (1995), Willie Morris	My Dog Skip (2000)
My Early Life: A Roving Commission (1930), Winston Churchill	Young Winston (1972)
My Father and Myself (1968), J. R. Ackerley	Secret Orchards (1979)
My Left Foot (1954), Christy Brown	My Left Foot (1989)
My Life in France (2006), Julia Child	Julie & Julia (2009)
My Posse Don't Do Homework (1992), LouAnne Johnson	Dangerous Minds (1995)
My Week with Marilyn (2000), Colin Clark	My Week with Marilyn (2011)
The Naked Civil Servant (1968), Quentin Crisp	The Naked Civil Servant (1975) (TV)
Never Cry Wolf (1963), Farley Mowat	Never Cry Wolf (1983)
Nine and a Half Weeks: A Memoir of a Love Affair (1978), Elizabeth McNeill	9½ Weeks (1986)
One Who Walked Alone (1986), Novalyne Price Ellis	same as above
Operation Cicero (German: Der Fall Cicero) (1950), Ludwig Carl Moyzisch	5 Fingers (1952)
Our Cancer Year (1994), Harvey Pekar and Joyce Brabner	American Splendor (2003)
Out of Africa (1937), Karen Blixen	Out of Africa (1985)
Papillon (1969), Henri Charrière	Papillon (1973)
Papillon (1969), Henri Charrière	Papillon (2017)
Permanent Midnight (1995), Jerry Stahl	Permanent Midnight (1998)
The Phantom Prince: My Life with Ted Bundy (1981), Elizabeth Kendall	Extremely Wicked, Shockingly Evil and Vile (2019)
The Pianist (1946), Władysław Szpilman	The Pianist (2002)
Please Don't Eat the Daisies (1957), Jean Kerr	Please Don't Eat the Daisies (1960)
Pour en finir avec Octobre (1982), Francis Simard	Octobre (1994)
Prisoners are People (1952), Kenyon J. Scudder	Unchained (1955)
Private Parts (1993), Howard Stern	Private Parts (1997)
Proved Innocent: The Story of Gerry Conlon of the Guildford Four (1990), Gerry Conlon	In the Name of the Father (1993)
Prozac Nation (1994), Elizabeth Wurtzel	Prozac Nation (2001)
Raging Bull: My Story, Jake LaMotta	Raging Bull (1980)
Reversal of Fortune: Inside the von Bülow Case (1985), Alan Dershowitz	Reversal of Fortune (1990)
Riding in Cars with Boys (1992), Beverly D'Onofrio	Riding in Cars with Boys (2001)
Rocket Boys (1998), Homer Hickam	October Sky (1999)
Rogue Trader: How I Brought Down Barings Bank and Shook the Financial World (1995), Nick Leeson	Rogue Trader (1999)
A Rumor of War (1977), Philip Caputo	A Rumor of War (1980) (TV) (mini)
Running with Scissors (2002), Augusten Burroughs	Running with Scissors (2006)
See No Evil (2003), Robert Baer	Syriana (2005)
Seven Pillars of Wisdom (1926), T. E. Lawrence	Lawrence of Arabia (1962)
Seven Pillars of Wisdom (1926), T. E. Lawrence	A Dangerous Man: Lawrence After Arabia (1990)
Seven Years in Tibet (German: Sieben Jahre in Tibet. Mein Leben am Hofe des Dalai Lama) (1952), Heinrich Harrer	Seven Years in Tibet (1997)
Shake Hands with the Devil: The Failure of Humanity in Rwanda (2003), Roméo Dallaire	Shake Hands with the Devil (2007)
The Short-Timers (1979), Gustav Hasford	Full Metal Jacket (1987)
The Soloist: A Lost Dream, an Unlikely Friendship, and the Redemptive Power of Music (2008), Steve Lopez	The Soloist (2009)
Somebody Up There Likes Me (1955), Rocky Graziano	Somebody Up There Likes Me (1956)
The Story of My Life (1903), Helen Keller	The Miracle Worker (1962)
The Story of My Life (1903), Helen Keller	The Miracle Worker (1979) (TV)
The Story of My Life (1903), Helen Keller	Helen Keller Monogatari: Ai to Hikari no Tenshi (ヘレン·ケラー物語 愛と光の天使) (1981) (TV)
The Story of My Life (1903), Helen Keller	The Miracle Worker (2000) (TV)
The Story of My Life (1903), Helen Keller	Black (2005)
Soul Surfer (2004), Bethany Hamilton	Soul Surfer (2011)
The Story of the Trapp Family Singers (1949), Maria von Trapp	The Trapp Family (German: Die Trapp-Familie) (1956)
The Story of the Trapp Family Singers (1949), Maria von Trapp	The Trapp Family in America (German: Die Trapp-Familie in Amerika) (1958)
The Story of the Trapp Family Singers (1949), Maria von Trapp	The Sound of Music (1965)
The Strawberry Statement (1969), James Simon Kunen	The Strawberry Statement (1970)
A Tale of Love and Darkness (2002), Amos Oz	A Tale of Love and Darkness (2012)
The Taliban Shuffle (2011), Kim Barker	Whiskey Tango Foxtrot (2016)
A Taste of My Own Medicine (1988), Edward Rosenbaum	The Doctor (1991)
Then They Came for Me (2011), Maziar Bahari	Rosewater (2014)
To America with Love (1976), Abbie Hoffman	Steal This Movie! (2000)
Touching the Void (1988), Joe Simpson	Touching the Void (2003)
Truth and Duty: The Press, the President and the Privilege of Power (2005), Mary Mapes	Truth (2015)
Tuesdays with Morrie (1997), Mitch Albom	Tuesdays with Morrie (1999)
Twelve Years a Slave (1853), Solomon Northup	Solomon Northup's Odyssey (1984) (TV)
Twelve Years a Slave (1853), Solomon Northup	12 Years a Slave (2013)
UFO Crash at Roswell (1991), Kevin D. Randle and Donald R. Schmitt	Roswell (1994)
Under the Tuscan Sun (1996), Frances Mayes	Under the Tuscan Sun (2003)
The Walton Experience (1978), Travis Walton	Fire in the Sky (1993)
Wild (2012), Cheryl Strayed	Wild (2014)
The Wolf of Wall Street (2007), Jordan Belfort	The Wolf of Wall Street (2013)
Yes Man (2005), Danny Wallace	Yes Man (2008)

=== Manuals and self-help books ===
Book	Film adaptation(s)
Act Like a Lady, Think Like a Man (2009), Steve Harvey	Think Like a Man (2012)
Act Like a Lady, Think Like a Man (2009), Steve Harvey	Think Like a Man Too (2014)
Everything You Always Wanted to Know About Sex* (*But Were Afraid to Ask) (1969), David Reuben	Everything You Always Wanted to Know About Sex* (*But Were Afraid to Ask) (1972)
He's Just Not That Into You (2004), Greg Behrendt and Liz Tuccillo	He's Just Not That Into You (2009)
The Joy of Sex (1972), Alex Comfort	Joy of Sex (1984)
Life Begins at Forty (1932), Walter B. Pitkin	Life Begins at 40 (1935)
Queen Bees and Wannabes (2002), Rosalind Wiseman	Mean Girls (2004)
Queen Bees and Wannabes (2002), Rosalind Wiseman	Mean Girls 2 (2011) (TV)
Queen Bees and Wannabes (2002), Rosalind Wiseman	Mean Girls (2024)
The Secret (2006), Rhonda Byrne	The Secret: Dare to Dream (2020)
Sex and the Single Girl (1962), Helen Gurley Brown	Sex and the Single Girl (1964)
What to Expect When You're Expecting (1984), Heidi Murkoff and Sharon Mazel	What to Expect When You're Expecting (2012)

== Essays and articles ==
Essay/article	Film adaptation(s)
"Adventures in the Ransom Trade", William Prochnau, Vanity Fair	Proof of Life (2000)
"The Allman Brothers Story", Cameron Crowe and Faybeth Diamond, Rolling Stone, 6 December 1973	Almost Famous (2000)
"The Ballad of the Urban Cowboy: America's Search for True Grit", Aaron Latham, Esquire, 1978	Urban Cowboy (1980)
"Biker Boyz", Michael Gougis, New Times LA, April 2000	Biker Boyz (2003)
"The boys in the bank: A fouled-up holdup moves step by step from threats to farce to violence", P. F. Kluge and Thomas Moore, Life, 22 September 1972	Dog Day Afternoon (1975)
"A Butler Well Served by This Election", Wil Haygood, The Washington Post, 2008	The Butler (2013)
"The Death and Life of Dith Pran", Sydney Schanberg, The New York Times Magazine, 20 January 1980	The Killing Fields (1984)
Fear and Loathing in Las Vegas, Hunter S. Thompson, based on two-part series in Rolling Stone, 1971	Fear and Loathing in Las Vegas (1997)
"The Flash of Genius", John Seabrook, The New Yorker, 1993	Flash of Genius (2008)
"The Great Escape: How the CIA Used a Fake Sci-Fi Flick to Rescue Americans from Tehran", Joshuah Bearman, Wired, 2007	Argo (2012)
"Jerry and Marge Go Large", Jason Fagone, The Huffington Post, 2018	Jerry & Marge Go Large (2022)
"Life's Swell", Susan Orlean, Outside, 1998	Blue Crush (2002)
"The Man Who Knew Too Much", Marie Brenner, Vanity Fair, 1996	The Insider (1999)
"Mark of a Murderer", Mike McAlary, Esquire, 1997	City by the Sea (2002)
"The Muse of the Coyote Ugly", Elizabeth Gilbert, GQ, March 1997	Coyote Ugly (2000)
"Nazi Spies in America", Leon G. Turrou, New York Post, 5 December 1938 – 4 January 1939	Confessions of a Nazi Spy (1939)
"Racer X", Ken Li, Vibe, 1998	The Fast and the Furious (2001)
"Shattered Glass", Buzz Bissinger, Vanity Fair, 1998	Shattered Glass (2003)
"Someone to Lean On", Gary Smith, Sports Illustrated, 16 December 1996	Radio (2003)
"Something's Got To Give", Darcy Frey, The New York Times Magazine	Pushing Tin (1999)
"To See and Not See", Oliver Sacks	At First Sight (1999)
Tora! Tora! Tora!, Gordon W. Prange, Reader's Digest, October–November 1963	Tora! Tora! Tora! (1970)
"Tribal Rites of the New Saturday Night", Nik Cohn, New York, 1976	Saturday Night Fever (1977)
"The Worst Marriage in Georgetown", Franklin Foer, The New York Times Magazine, 6 July 2012	Georgetown (2019)

== See also ==
- Film adaptation
- Films based on the Bible
- List of films based on magazine articles
- Lists of works of fiction made into feature films
- Lists of film source material
