= Gary Rader =

American army draft protester (1944–1973)

Gary Eugene Rader
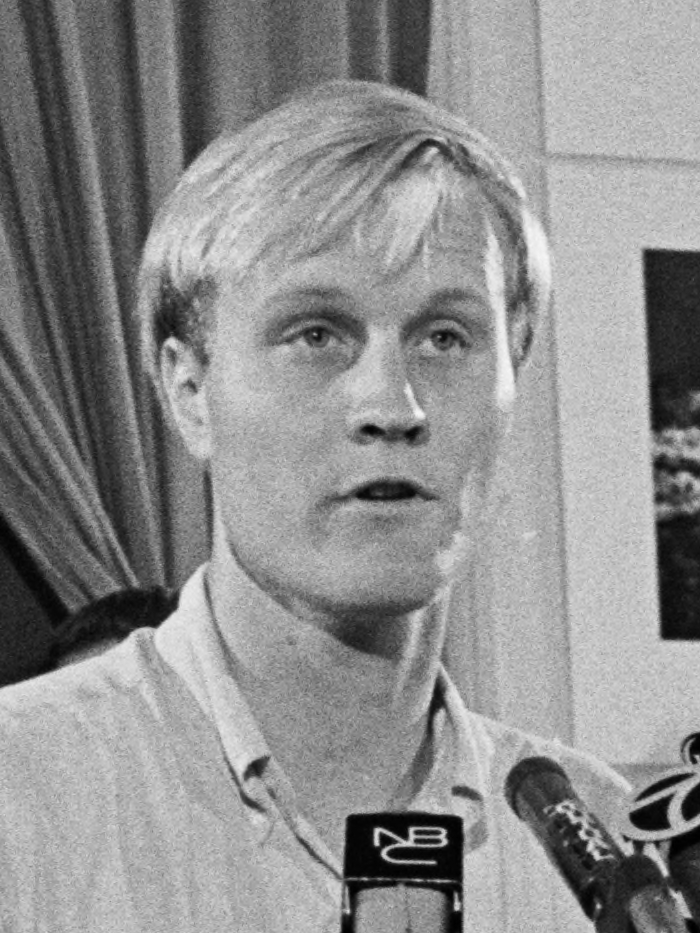
- Rader in 1967
- Born: January 14, 1944; Albuquerque, New Mexico, U.S.
- Died: November 1973 (aged 29) Boston, Massachusetts, U.S.
- Allegiance: United States
- Branch: United States Army Reserve
- Education: Northwestern University

Gary Eugene Rader (January 14, 1944 – November 1973) was an American Army Reservist known for burning his draft card in protest of the Vietnam War, while wearing his U.S. Army Special Forces uniform. Afterward, he engaged in anti-war activism.

== Background ==
Upon turning 18, Rader registered for the draft, and received his draft card from the Selective Service System. He entered Northwestern University in Evanston, Illinois, as an undergraduate student of political science. His status as a college student deferred his being drafted into the military. Upon leaving college, in mid-1965 he was re-classified as 1A: available for unrestricted military duty. He signed up for the U.S. Army Reserve, then trained for the Army Special Forces, commonly known as the Green Berets. Of this elite formation, Rader said, "I wanted to see what the best was like." Reading Ramparts magazine in February 1966, he was struck by an article, "The whole thing was a lie!", from ex-Green Beret Master Sergeant Donald Duncan who turned down a field commission to the rank of captain and left the Army. Duncan wrote that a majority of South Vietnamese citizens were in favor of North Vietnamese politics, or against Saigon politics, or both. After realizing this, Duncan said he "had to accept also that the position, 'We are in Vietnam because we are in sympathy with the aspirations and desires of the Vietnamese people,' was a lie." Duncan did not think the U.S. should be a part of Vietnam's political disputes, and he opined that "anti-communism is a lousy substitute for democracy." He wrote that the U.S. should get out of Vietnam and let them decide their own fate, even though he felt that a united Vietnam would not be better off "under Ho's brand of communism."

Rader went on active duty in September 1966 and was sent to Fort Bragg in North Carolina, the home of the regular Army Special Forces. Rader said that he spoke to Green Beret soldiers returning from Vietnam and that they reported similar experiences to Duncan's. The responses these soldiers gave were ones Rader classified as belonging primarily to two groups: one group saying they were following orders and the other group saying the Vietnamese did not know what was best for them, that they needed to be "trained". A much smaller group said that the war was wrong and that they would refuse to go back. Rader finished active duty in mid-January 1967 "thoroughly disgusted with the Army".

Before his active Army Reserve assignment, Rader had been developing with Kenneth Janda at Northwestern a computerized notification system. In January 1967 the two men's work was published as a report on "a computerized system for automatically notifying social scientists of new journal articles", ones in their area of interest.

== Draft-card burning ==
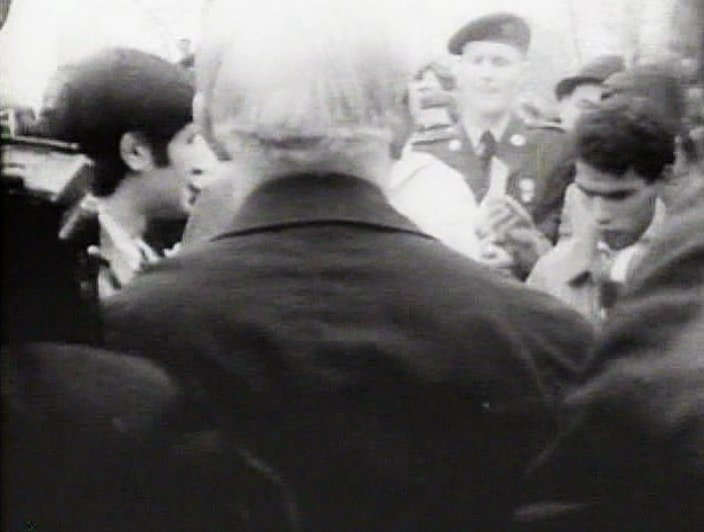
Rader, wearing his Green Beret uniform, burned his draft card on April 15, 1967, at Sheep Meadow, Central Park, New York City

Frustrated with his Army experiences in February and March, on April 14, 1967, Rader heard about a large anti-war protest which was to take place the next day in New York City. He contacted the leader of the student protesters coming from Cornell University and said he would join them. At Sheep Meadow, Central Park, wearing his Green Beret uniform covered by a black ski jacket, he assembled with the group of draft card burners and their friends. At around 11:30 am after 60 men began burning their cards, he removed his jacket, placed his beret on his head "at the correct angle", and burned his draft card.

A large number of people were attending or watching this rally, including anti-war activist Abbie Hoffman, New York City policemen, FBI men, newsreel cameramen, reporters, photographers and passers-by. Time magazine estimated 75 total cards burnt; however, participant Martin Jezer wrote that there were about 158 in all.

On April 17, he wrote a letter of resignation to his company commander. The 23-year-old Rader was arrested by FBI agents several days later at his home in Evanston. He was held in a Chicago prison cell overnight and released on bail the next day. Penalties he faced included up to five years in prison, up to $10,000 fine, and an additional six-months in jail for wearing his uniform without approval. Of the Sheep Meadow draft-card burners, only Rader was charged with the federal crime. Most of the others, according to Jezer who burned his own card at the rally, were visited by FBI agents but not charged. Rader was arraigned on April 28; seven men burned their draft cards at his arraignment.

In May 1967 in response to the Sheep Meadow demonstration, 56-year-old anarchist intellectual Paul Goodman published a piece in The New York Review of Books sympathetic to draft-card burning. The editors printed a handful of responses, including one from Rader who described his motivation for the act. Writing five months after being arrested, he expected that it was not likely that he would be tried for burning his draft card: "the Army does not like to court-martial in the glare of publicity."

== Chicago draft resistance ==
Rader determined that he would devote his time to working against the draft and against U.S. military involvement in Vietnam. For Liberation magazine he wrote about his plans: "We are no longer interested in merely protesting the war; we are out to stop it." In September 1967 with anti-war activist David F. Greenberg, he founded Chicago Area Draft Resisters (CADRE), an organization with links to the national protest movement. In association with the National Mobilization Committee to End the War in Vietnam (The Mobe), Rader helped organize the "March on the Pentagon" held on October 21, 1967. For this rally, Rader worked with Abbie Hoffman, David Dellinger, Jerry Rubin, William Francis Pepper, Carl Davidson of Students for a Democratic Society, Professor Robert Greenblatt of The Mobe, Lincoln Lynch of the Congress of Racial Equality, and Amy Swerdlow of Women Strike for Peace (WSP). Rader stood up and spoke at the March on the Pentagon; Norman Mailer described the speech he gave as being "thought by many to be the best hour of them all." Rader was arrested and put in jail with other protesters. There, he took part in a hunger strike, and was fed intravenously by prison personnel.

Rader wrote letters and made public appearances in support of CADRE. In December 1967, he took part in an interview which was broadcast on WAMU, the second part of a series on the Vietnam War; the first part's interview subject had been General William Westmoreland. He wrote a letter seeking funds for CADRE from readers of The Movement, a publication of the Student Nonviolent Coordinating Committee. He wrote to WSP to ask for bail donations and legal defense resources, urging the women to "get behind this fine group of young idealists, working not for themselves, but for the future of the race."

CADRE printed original articles as well as reprints of other articles, and made the literature available to young people in the Chicago metropolitan area. CADRE raised funds to bail out any imprisoned for draft resistance, and established a pool of lawyers willing to take such cases. Rader moved to New York in February 1968 but he continued to work for the cause of war resistance. CADRE helped organize Chicago area activities for March 1968 including a week of protest and a day of civil disobedience. During the 1968 Democratic National Convention, CADRE was present at protests outside of the convention. The organization faded after 1973 when President Richard Nixon abolished the draft, and by 1974 or 1975, CADRE ceased operation.

Rader's CADRE partner Greenberg had been a member of The Mobe, and in 1967 he wrote a monograph for CADRE: Vietnam and the draft. Later he earned a Ph.D. in high-energy physics, then became interested in crime and society. Greenberg is a sociology professor emeritus at New York University and has published several books. After Rader committed suicide in a Boston psychiatric hospital in November 1973, Greenberg dedicated his 1993 book to him as well as to German Green Party founder Petra Kelly who died in 1992 and prisoner rights activist Fay Stender who died in 1980.
