= Draft-card burning =

Vietnam War draft protests, 1964–1973

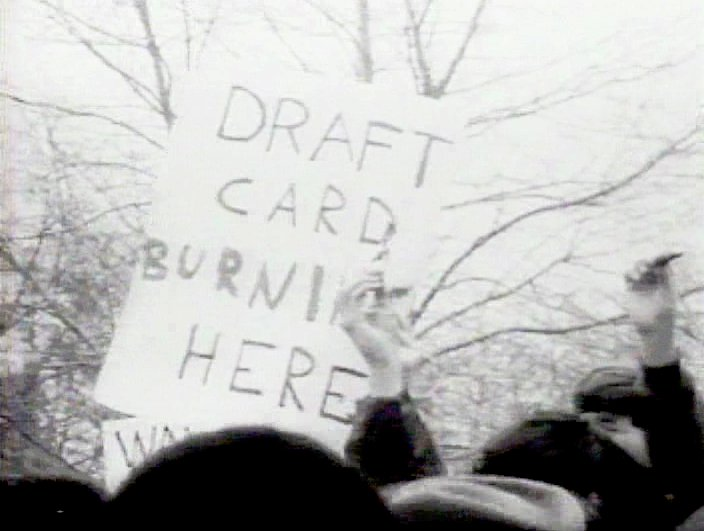
Young men burn their draft cards in New York City on April 15, 1967, at Sheep Meadow, Central Park.

Draft-card burning was a symbol of protest performed by thousands of young men in the United States and Australia in the 1960s and early 1970s as part of the anti-war movement. The first draft-card burners were American men participating in the opposition to United States involvement in the Vietnam War. The first well-publicized protest was in December 1963, with a 22-year-old conscientious objector, Gene Keyes, setting fire to his card on Christmas Day in Champaign, Illinois. In May 1964, a larger demonstration, with about 50 people in Union Square, New York, was organized by the War Resisters League chaired by David McReynolds.

By May 1965, it was happening with greater frequency around the US. To limit this kind of protest, in August 1965, the United States Congress enacted a law to broaden draft card violations to punish anyone who "knowingly destroys, knowingly mutilates" his draft card. Subsequently, 46 men were indicted for burning their draft cards at various rallies, and four major court cases were heard. One of them, United States v. O'Brien, was argued before the Supreme Court. The act of draft-card burning was defended as a symbolic form of free speech, a constitutional right guaranteed by the First Amendment. The Supreme Court decided against the draft-card burners; it determined that the federal law was justified and unrelated to the freedom of speech.

In Australia, following the 1966 troop increases directed by Prime Minister Harold Holt, conscription notices were burned at mass demonstrations against Australian involvement in Vietnam. In June 1968, the government reacted by strengthening penalties for infractions of the Menzies government 1964 National Service Act, including the burning of registration cards. War protest ceased in 1972 when Australia's new Labor government withdrew troops from Vietnam and abolished conscription.

From 1965 to 1973, very few men in the US were convicted of burning their draft cards. Some 25,000 others went unpunished. Before 1965, the act of burning a draft card was already prohibited by US statute—the registrant was required to carry the card at all times, and any destruction of it was thus against the law. Also, it was entirely possible for a young man to destroy his draft card and still answer his country's call to service by appearing at an induction center and serving in the military, and it was possible for a registrant to faithfully keep his card on his person but fail to appear when called. The draft card was not an essential part of the government's ability to draft men into the military. Thus draft-card burning was an act of war resistance more than it was draft resistance.

The image of draft-card burning was powerful and influential in American politics and culture. It appeared in magazines, newspapers, and television, signaling a political divide between those who backed the US government and its military goals and those against US involvement in Vietnam. Richard Nixon ran for president in 1968 on a platform based partly on putting an end to the draft, to undercut protesters making use of the symbolic act. As president, Nixon ended the draft in 1973, rendering the symbolic act of draft-card burning unnecessary.

== Background ==
=== United States ===
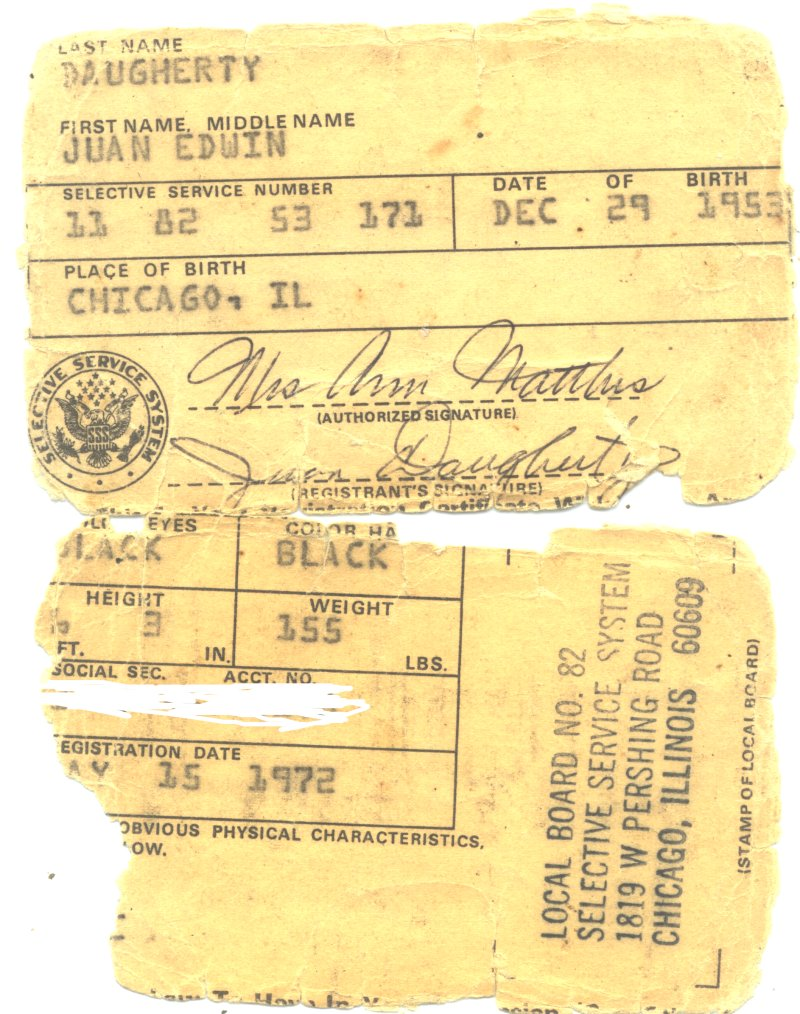
A Vietnam-era draft card worn out from years in a wallet

From 1948, under the Selective Service Act, all American men aged 18 through 25 were required to register with a local draft board. In case of war, the able-bodied ones among them could be drafted to serve in the military. The law required the men to always carry their draft cards with them. These were small cards bearing the registrant's identifying information, the date and place of registration, and a unique Selective Service number.

In an amendment sponsored by Congressmen L. Mendel Rivers and William G. Bray, on August 31, 1965, the law was augmented with four words to include penalties for any person who "knowingly destroys, knowingly mutilates" the card under 50 U.S.C. § 462(b)(3). Strom Thurmond moved the bill through the Senate, calling draft-card burning "contumacious conduct" which "represents a potential threat to the exercise of the power to raise and support armies." At the time, many observers (including the U.S. Court of Appeals for the First Circuit) believed that Congress had intentionally targeted anti-war draft-card burners.

=== Australia ===
Following the 1964 National Service Act, legislated in response to the Indonesia–Malaysia confrontation, 20-year-old Australian men were subject to military service based on a birthday lottery. In April 1965, Prime Minister Sir Robert Menzies sent a battalion of Army regulars to Vietnam, beginning an overseas involvement that lasted for seven years and provoked deeply divisive debate back home. In early 1966, Menzies retired, and Harold Holt became prime minister. In March 1966, Holt announced troop increases, bringing the total commitment to 4,500 men in Vietnam, a tripling of effort. Significantly, conscripts could now be sent into combat. Protests broke out, including a draft-card burning demonstration outside of Holt's home. In late June 1966 with President Lyndon B. Johnson listening, Holt spoke in Washington, D.C., in support of American policy. In his speech, he closed by saying that Australia was a "staunch friend" of America, willing to go "all the way with LBJ". This statement was widely criticized in Australia. Marxist writer and draft-card burner Andy Blunden said in July that, "by following America into Vietnam, Holt's Australia is playing the role of Mussolini's Italy." In December the government bolstered the Vietnam presence with 1,700 more troops.

John Gorton took the Prime Minister position in January 1968. In June 1968, the government doubled the penalty for burning registration cards. In 1971, the government committed to a gradual but total withdrawal from Vietnam—following both Australian opinion and America's new policy. In 1972, all troops including the advisory team were ordered home from Vietnam. Draft resisters in jail were freed. The final birthday lottery was held September 22, 1972.

== US court cases ==
=== Early cases ===
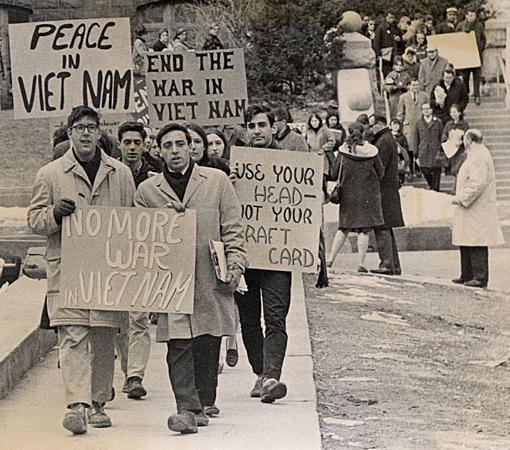
Antiwar protesters at the University of Wisconsin in 1965

On October 15, 1965, David J. Miller burned his draft card at a rally near the Armed Forces Induction Center on Whitehall Street in Manhattan. He spoke briefly to the crowd from atop a sound truck and then tried but failed to burn his card with matches—the wind kept blowing them out. The crowd offered a lighter, and it worked. Miller was arrested by the FBI three days later in Manchester, New Hampshire, while setting up peace literature on a table. The 24-year-old pacifist, member of the Catholic Worker Movement, became the first man convicted under the 1965 amendment. In April 1966 with his wife and breast-feeding baby in attendance, he was sentenced to 30 months in prison. The case was argued in the United States Court of Appeals for the Second Circuit in June. Miller's attorney held that "symbolic speech is protected by the First Amendment; burning a draft card is a most dramatic form of communication, and there is a constitutional right to make one's speech as effective as possible." The court did not agree. The case was decided later that year in October: Miller's conviction was confirmed, and his sentence upheld. Loudon Wainwright Jr. wrote in Life magazine that Miller, "without really knowing it, might be embarking on a lifelong career of protest." Miller remained free on bail until June 1968 at which time he served 22 months in federal prison.

At an anti-war rally at the Iowa Memorial Union in Iowa City, Iowa, on October 20, 1965, 20-year-old Stephen Lynn Smith, a student at the University of Iowa, spoke to the crowd and burned his draft card. He said, "I do not feel that five years of my life are too much to give to say that this law is wrong." He had previously alerted newspaper reporters and two television stations, and they were present to record his act. Smith said he was against the involvement of the US in Vietnam and that he was against the system of conscription. In November 1966 he was found guilty and placed on probation for three years.

In June–July 1967, United States v. Edelman was argued and decided in the US Second Circuit. Tom Cornell, Marc Paul Edelman, and Roy Lisker had burned their draft cards at a public rally organized by the Committee for Non-Violent Action in Union Square, New York City, on November 6, 1965. A fourth man older than 36 also burned his card at the rally but was not indicted. Edelman, Cornell, and Lisker were convicted and sentenced to six months.

=== United States v. O'Brien ===
On the morning of March 31, 1966, David Paul O'Brien and three companions burned their draft cards on the steps of the South Boston Courthouse in front of a crowd that included several FBI agents. After the four men came under attack from some of the crowd, an FBI agent ushered O'Brien inside the courthouse and advised him of his rights. O'Brien made a confession and produced the charred remains of the certificate. He was then indicted for violating § 462(b)(3) and put on trial in the United States District Court for the District of Massachusetts.

O'Brien argued that the four words ("knowingly destroys, knowingly mutilates") added to the draft card law were unconstitutional and an abridgment of the freedom of speech. He argued that the amendment served no valid purpose because the Selective Service Act already required draft registrants to carry their card on their persons at all times; thus, any form of destruction was already a violation. He explained that he burned the draft card publicly as a form of symbolic speech to persuade others to oppose the war "so that other people would reevaluate their positions with Selective Service, with the armed forces, and reevaluate their place in the culture of today, to hopefully consider my position." On January 24, 1968, the Supreme Court determined that the 1965 amendment was constitutional as enacted and as applied and that it did not distinguish between public or private destruction or mutilation of the draft card. They determined that nothing was necessarily expressive in burning a draft card. Chief Justice Earl Warren said, "we cannot accept the view that an apparently limitless variety of conduct can be labeled 'speech' whenever the person engaging in the conduct intends thereby to express an idea." O'Brien's previous sentence of six years was upheld.

The Supreme Court's conclusion was criticized by legal observers such as Dean Alfange Jr. for its "astonishingly cavalier" treatment. Many saw in O'Brien's act a clear communicative element with the "intent to convey a particularized message", an intent to which the court did not give much weight. Instead, the court weighed as more significant the government's interest "in assuring the continued availability of issued Selective Service certificates."

In 1975, legal scholar John Hart Ely found fault with O'Brien. He pointed out that the draft-card-burning question was not decided in relation to the similar one surrounding the act of flag burning, an issue the court had avoided for years. Ely's analysis was aided by that of Thomas Scanlon in 1972, in A Theory of Freedom of Expression, which interpreted the freedom of speech broadly, including such public and political acts as self-immolation. In 1990 O'Brien was analyzed again by critics following the case United States v. Eichman which determined that flag burning was a form of free speech and some made comparisons to the earlier 1984 case Clark v. Community for Creative Non-Violence which determined that sleeping at a protest rally location in a downtown park was valid as a symbolic expression intended to bring attention to the plight of people experiencing homelessness. These expansive interpretations of the freedom of speech appeared large enough to include draft-card burning. The position in O'Brien was that the individual's right to freedom of speech did not limit the government in prohibiting harmful conduct. However, the harmful conduct of burning a draft card did not have the normal test applied: it was not determined to be a case of "clear and present danger".

In 1996, future Supreme Court Justice Elena Kagan pointed out that the O'Brien court did not appear to be concerned whether the law as enacted or enforced "matched, or even resembled", the asserted government interest of stopping draft resistance protests. Kagan noted that the law prohibiting the destruction of the draft card "interfered" with only one point of view: that of the anti-war protester. She suggested a successful challenge to O'Brien might come from focusing on such skewed constraints.

== Rallies ==
On Armed Forces Day in the United States (Saturday, May 16, 1964), in New York, 12 students at a rally burned their draft cards.

At the University of California, Berkeley, on May 5, 1965, amid a protest march of several hundred people carrying a black coffin to the Berkeley draft board, 40 men burned their draft cards. One of them told reporters the act was symbolic—he said "we can get new cards if we apply for them." On May 22, 1965, the Berkeley draft board was revisited, with 19 men burning their cards. President Lyndon B. Johnson was hanged in effigy.

In August 1965, Life carried a photograph of a man demonstrating in front of the Armed Forces Induction Center on Whitehall Street in Manhattan, July 30, 1965. Like David J. Miller a few months later, he was a member of the Catholic Worker Movement. He was not arrested.

Antiwar activist Abbie Hoffman burned his draft card privately in the spring of 1967. Hoffman's card classified him as 4F—unfit for service—because of bronchial asthma. His act was purely symbolic; he would never be drafted. However, Hoffman supported those registrants who were burning their cards.

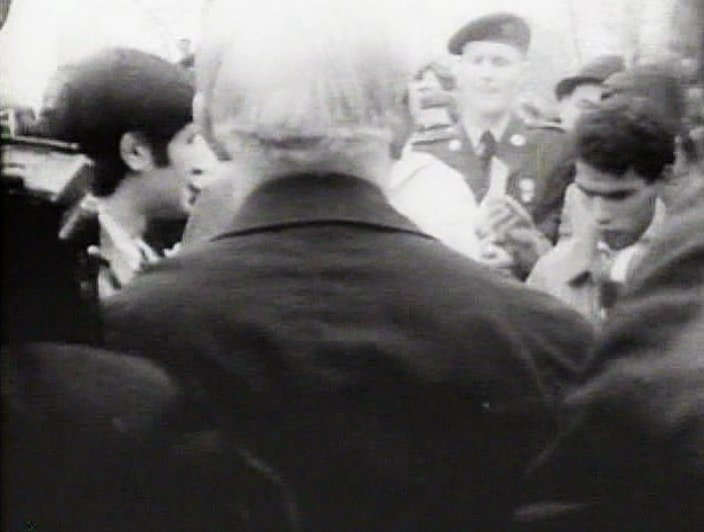
Green Beret Gary Rader offers his draft card to be burnt.

On April 15, 1967, at Sheep Meadow, Central Park, New York City, some 60 young men, including a few students from Cornell University, came together to burn their draft cards in a Maxwell House coffee can. Surrounded by their friends who linked arms to protect them, the men began burning their cards. Others rushed in to join them, holding their burning cards up. Watching this were police, FBI men, newsreel camera operators, reporters, photographers and passers-by. Uniformed Green Beret Army reservist Gary Rader walked to the center and burned his draft card. The 23-year-old was arrested by FBI agents several days later at his home in Evanston, Illinois. Time magazine estimated 75 total cards; participant Martin Jezer wrote that there were about 158 cards burnt in all. Future Youth International Party leader Hoffman was in attendance.

The reports of this large protest were discussed by the leaders of the Spring Mobilization Conference, a march of 150,000 people led by Rev. Martin Luther King Jr. and Dr. Benjamin Spock starting from Sheep Meadow. The May conference developed into the National Mobilization Committee to End the War in Vietnam, known as The Mobe. In January 1968, Spock was indicted on charges of encouraging draft evasion, with the Boston 5. He was convicted on July 10, 1968. The charges were overturned on appeal in July 1969.

In May 1967 in response to the Sheep Meadow demonstration, 56-year-old anarchist intellectual Paul Goodman published a piece in The New York Review of Books sympathetic to both public and private draft-card burning. The editors printed a salvo of responses. One from Ann D. Gordon, a doctoral student of American history, said that private, individual acts of card burning were useless in stopping the war. Jezer wrote a letter thanking Goodman for his support and, as an eyewitness, corrected him on certain details. Jezer said the FBI arrested only Rader; FBI agents merely visited other participants. Goodman's article exhorted his readers to massive direct action in draft resistance; in response, folk singer Robert Claiborne wrote to the Review to say that Goodman's plan would "check the growth of the peace movement and markedly reduce prospects for ending the war." Claiborne asserted that the "great majority" of Americans were "squares" over 30 and not in favor of war protest even though they were likely interested in "ending the slaughter of their sons and other people's sons."

October 16, 1967, was a day of widespread war protest organized by The Mobe in 30 cities across the US, with some 1,400 draft cards burned. At the Unitarian Arlington Street Church in Boston, draft registrants were allowed to turn in their draft cards to be sent as a package to Selective Service as an act of civil disobedience against the war. Those offering their draft cards split into two groups: a group of 214 turned in their cards, and 67 chose to burn their cards. These 67 used an old candle from prominent Unitarian preacher William Ellery Channing to supply the flame. One woman, Nan Stone, burned a draft card belonging to Steve Paillet—the 1965 law allowed anyone to be punished for draft-card burning, even someone who was not registered for the draft. Stone later typed up the information from the 214 turned-in cards to serve as a database of war resisters. She found that the average and median age of the men was 22 and that three out of four came from Harvard, Yale, or Boston University.

At San Francisco's Federal Building on December 4, 1967, some 500 protesters witnessed 88 draft cards collected and burned.

About 1,000 draft cards were turned in on April 3, 1968, in nationwide protests organized by The Mobe. In Boston, 15,000 protesters watched 235 men turn in their draft cards. War protesters were increasingly choosing the more profound act of turning in their draft cards, which gave the government the name and address of the protesters. Burning the draft card destroyed the evidence, and by this time, was seen as less courageous.

== Reactions ==
=== Within the anti-war movement ===
Even some supporters of the anti-war movement, such as William Sloane Coffin, expressed concern that the tactic was "unnecessarily hostile."

=== High media exposure ===
Many in America were unhappy with the draft-card burners or the frequent depiction of them in the media. Joseph Scerra, national commander of the Veterans of Foreign Wars, spoke against what he saw as too much news coverage: "All of our young people are not burning up their draft cards. All of our young people are not tearing up the flag. All of our youth are not supporting North Vietnam and carrying Viet Cong flags." In October 1967 at a rally in support of the government, a news photograph was snapped of a man kissing his draft card, his girlfriend smiling at his side. In Playboy's November 1967 issue, Playboy Playmate Kaya Christian wrote that her "turn-offs" were "hypocrites" and "draft card burners".

Leftist Ramparts magazine showed four draft cards being burned on the December 1967 cover. The Saturday Evening Post, a conservative publication, put an image of a draft-card burning on its January 27, 1968 cover. In 1967 off-Broadway and 1968 on Broadway and in London's West End, the musical Hair featured a climactic scene in Act I of a group of men in a hippie "tribe" burning their draft cards while the main character Claude struggles with the decision to join them. Later, when the musical was staged in Yugoslavia, the draft-card burning scene was removed, as the local protesting youth viewed their army positively as a vehicle to fight off a possible invasion by the Soviet Union.

=== Framing the movement ===
President Johnson spoke strongly against the draft-card protesters, saying in October 1967 that he wanted the "antidraft movement" investigated for Communist influences. Reporting on his reaction, The New York Times presented the protests as being against the draft rather than the war. Many commentators focused on draft resistance as an explanation rather than the more challenging war resistance: the protesters' main concern.

=== Political impact ===
In 1968, when Richard Nixon was running for president, he promised to make the military into a purely volunteer force. In this, he was following others who had suggested such a strategy, including Donald Rumsfeld of the Republican Wednesday Group the year before. At the beginning of his second term as president, Nixon stopped the draft after February 1973. The last man to be drafted entered the US Army on June 30, 1973.
