= InsideOUT Writers =

U.S. nonprofit organization

- Formation: 1996
- Type: non profit
- Purpose: support network for formerly incarcerated young people
- Location: Los Angeles, California
- Key people: Sister Janet Harris
- Website: www.insideoutwriters.org

InsideOUT Writers (IOW) is a Los Angeles-based non-profit organization that conducts weekly writing classes inside Los Angeles County juvenile halls and jails. IOW also serves as a support network for formerly incarcerated young people. Since 1996, more than 11,000 youth have participated in over 15,000 classes.

During each class, students are given multiple writing prompts and are then asked to share their work and both receive and provide feedback from the writing circle. IOW also convenes annual writing retreats at juvenile detention facilities and publishes In Depth, a literary journal of students and alumni writings. The classes are taught by writers, poets, screenwriters, journalists, educators and other volunteers. Notable teachers have included Scott Budnick, Bruce Lisker and Mark Salzman. The organization is funded both by the county and private donors.

== History ==
InsideOUT Writers was founded in 1996 by Sister Janet Harris, PBVM, who was serving as the Catholic chaplain at Central Juvenile Hall. While speaking to the young inmates about what they were going through, she found them frustrated, hopeless, afraid, and wondered: "What outlets could she provide for them to process those feelings?" Sister Janet decided to start a writing experience at Central Juvenile Hall. She recruited then-Los Angeles Times writer Duane Noriyuki to come and teach a writing class. In 1996, Noriyuki wrote a piece for the Los Angeles Times about Harris's ministry entitled Sister of Mercy.

Shortly after the beginning of the program, Mario Rocha, who was on trial for murder, met Sister Harris when he was selected for the writing program. Harris was struck by his demeanor and was impressed with his writing skills. Ultimately, she became convinced of his innocence, even though he was convicted of murder, and she began her own investigation. After Harris found new witnesses and persuaded the law firm of Latham Watkins to take on the case for free, Rocha was exonerated.

Several notable figures have participated in IOW. In 2003, Scott Budnick began volunteering as an InsideOUT teacher at the Barry J. Nidorf Juvenile Hall in Sylmar, California. As of 2014, Budnick still volunteers at the Nidorf Juvenile Hall. After this experience and others, Budnick began to tell administrators and politicians about the problems he was seeing in the juvenile justice and criminal justice systems, and founded the Anti-Recidivism Coalition. Bruce Lisker, who was wrongfully convicted of murdering his mother, has taught with IOW. Mark Salzman taught for IOW at Central, and wrote a book about his experience. Christina McDowell, author of After Perfect, teaches with IOW.

In 2011, IOW teamed with the Los Angeles Opera to perform stories written by incarcerated youths at Central.

== Alumni program ==
In 2010, InsideOUT formalized an Alumni Program. When students get out of detention, InsideOUT provides case management, life skills training, continued creative writing classes, and mentoring, to build on what happens inside. During weekly writing circles, former incarcerated students reflect on their time on the inside and since.

Several InsideOUT alums have written about their experience with the program. IOW alums have also advocated for juvenile and criminal justice reforms. Jimmy Wu, a former student of Harris and Salzman, was the first IOW alumnus of to be hired by IOW.

Scott Budnick mentored Prophet Walker through IOW while Walker was incarcerated. Upon Walker's release from prison, Walker founded the Anti-Recidivism Coalition with Budnick and ran to be Assemblyman for California's 64th District. In 2015, Walker was a guest of Michelle Obama at the State of the Union.
