= Scott Budnick =

Scott Budnick may refer to the following:

- Scott Budnick (soccer) (born 1971), retired American soccer player
- Scott Budnick (film producer) (fl. 1990s–2020s), American film producer
