= Chicago 10: Speak Your Peace =

Chicago 10
- Promotional poster
- Directed by: Brett Morgen
- Written by: Brett Morgen
- Produced by: Graydon Carter; Brett Morgen
- Starring: Hank Azaria; Dylan Baker; Nick Nolte; Mark Ruffalo; Roy Scheider; Liev Schreiber; James Urbaniak; Jeffrey Wright
- Edited by: Stuart Levy
- Music by: Jeff Danna
- Production companies: Consolidated Documentaries; Participant Productions; River Road Entertainment; Curious Pictures
- Distributed by: Roadside Attractions
- Release date: January 18, 2007 (Sundance)
- Running time: 110 minutes
- Country: United States
- Language: English
- Box office: $177,490

Chicago 10: Speak Your Peace is a 2007 American animated documentary written and directed by Brett Morgen that tells the story of the Chicago Eight. The Chicago Eight were charged by the United States federal government with conspiracy, crossing state lines with intent to incite a riot, and other charges related to anti-Vietnam War and countercultural protests in Chicago, Illinois during the 1968 Democratic National Convention.

The film features the voices of Hank Azaria, Dylan Baker, Nick Nolte, Mark Ruffalo, Roy Scheider, Liev Schreiber, James Urbaniak, and Jeffrey Wright in an animated reenactment of the trial based on transcripts and rediscovered audio recordings. It also contains archival footage of Abbie Hoffman, David Dellinger, William Kunstler, Jerry Rubin, Bobby Seale, Tom Hayden, and Leonard Weinglass, and of the protest and riot itself.

== Plot ==
At the 1968 Democratic Convention, protesters, denied permits for public demonstrations, repeatedly clashed with the Chicago Police Department, and these clashes were witnessed live by a television audience of over 50 million. The events had a polarizing effect on the country.

Needing to find a scapegoat for the disturbances, the Nixon Administration charged eight of the most vocal activists with conspiracy, inciting to riot, along with other charges and brought them to trial a year later. The defendants represented a broad cross-section of the anti-war movement, from counter-culture icons Abbie Hoffman and Jerry Rubin, to renowned pacifist David Dellinger.

Seven of the defendants were represented by Leonard Weinglass and famed liberal attorney William Kunstler, who went head-to-head with prosecution attorney Tom Foran. The eighth defendant, Bobby Seale, co-chair of the Black Panther Party, insisted on defending himself and was bound, gagged and handcuffed to his chair, on the order of Judge Julius Hoffman.

== Cast ==
- Hank Azaria as Abbie Hoffman and Allen Ginsberg
- Dylan Baker as David Dellinger and David Stahl
- Nick Nolte as Tom Foran
- Mark Ruffalo as Jerry Rubin
- Roy Scheider as Judge Julius Hoffman
- Liev Schreiber as William Kunstler
- James Urbaniak as Rennie Davis and Richard Schultz
- Reg Rogers as Tom Hayden
- Jeffrey Wright as Bobby Seale
- Ebon Moss-Bachrach as Paul Krassner
- Debra Eisenstadt as Mary Ellen Dahl and Waitress
- Lloyd Floyd as Robert Pierson / Arthur Aznavoorian / Police officer
- Leonard Weinglass as himself
- Catherine Curtin as Barbara Callender
- Chuck Montgomery as Lee Weiner
- Dave Boat as Norman Mailer, Marshal #1
- Roger L. Jackson as Marshal #2, Reporter #4, Reporter #6
- Amy Ryan as Anita Hoffman

== Production ==
The title of the film is drawn from a quote by Jerry Rubin, who said, "Anyone who calls us the Chicago Seven is a racist. Because you're discrediting Bobby Seale. You can call us the Chicago Eight, but really we're the Chicago Ten, because our two lawyers went down with us." The animated courtroom sequences were also informed by Rubin's description of the trial as a "cartoon show".

Morgen tells IONCINEMA, "We took events that happened forty years ago and ultimately wrote a film about today. I wasn’t born then so I couldn’t do it any other way," and "That’s why when Allen Ginsberg goes to the witness stand and says: ‘Politics is theater and magic, is the manipulation by the media of imagery that hypnotizes the country into believing in a war that didn’t exist’, he’s not speaking about the Vietnam war, he's referring to Colin Powell testimony in front of United Nations. That was my interpretation of it." Music from the 60s was not used in the film because according to Morgen, it "became a cliché, something anachronistic." Morgen explained to Chicago Magazine that the inclusion of music by artists such as Black Sabbath, Rage Against the Machine, the Beastie Boys, and Eminem is because "I don’t think of this as a movie about 1968 at all. I think this is a movie about 2007 and 2008."

== Release ==
The film premiered January 18, 2007 at the 2007 Sundance Film Festival. It later premiered at Silverdocs, the AFI/Discovery Channel Documentary Festival in Downtown Silver Spring, Maryland. The film opened in the United States on February 29, 2008; with a limited release, peaking at just 14 theatres, it earned $177,490 at the box office. It was aired nationally on the PBS program Independent Lens on October 29, 2008.

== Critical reception ==
On the review aggregator website Rotten Tomatoes, 80% of 85 critics' reviews are positive, with an average rating of 6.7/10. The website's consensus reads: "Brett Morgan's half-animated, half-documentary film is an arresting, sometimes visionary portrait of the historic and chaotic trial." Metacritic, which uses a weighted average, assigned the film a score of 69 out of 100, based on 24 critics, indicating "generally favorable" reviews.

Jim Emerson of RogerEbert.com gave the film 3.5 out of 4 stars, and wrote:

Through the kaleidoscopic prism of Brett Morgen's uproarious Chicago 10, a zippy mixture of documentary footage and motion-capture animation, we see how the confrontations between police and protesters at the 1968 Democratic National Convention played out as political theater...[d]uring the trial, the defendants turned Judge Julius Hoffman's kangaroo courtroom into the stage for a wild farce, complete with kisses, costumes and paper airplanes.... Through the prism of this movie we can see how [Abbie] Hoffman's satirical brand of 'political theater,' a concept he did not invent but adeptly exploited, may have seemed both cynical and naive at the time, but was keenly perceptive, even prescient.

== Accolades ==
The film was the winner of the Silver Hugo for Best Documentary at the Chicago International Film Festival in 2008. The film was nominated in 2009 for Best Documentary Screenplay from the Writers Guild of America and nominated for a News & Documentary Emmy Award in 2009 for Outstanding Individual Achievement in a Craft: Graphic Design and Art Direction.

== See also ==
- Conspiracy: The Trial of the Chicago 8
- Steal This Movie!
- William Kunstler: Disturbing the Universe
- The Chicago 8
- The Trial of the Chicago 7
