= Anti-Recidivism Coalition =

Los Angeles-based non-profit organization

- Formation: 2013
- Location: Los Angeles, California
- Founder: Scott Budnick
- Website: www.antirecidivism.org

The Anti-Recidivism Coalition (ARC) is a Los Angeles–based nonprofit organization founded by Scott Budnick. ARC is a support network for formerly incarcerated individuals and advocates for criminal justice reform. ARC's mission is to reduce incarceration, improve the outcomes of formerly incarcerated individuals, and build healthier communities.

== History ==
In 1997, Budnick first became interested in juveniles in prison after reading a Rolling Stone article about Brandon Hein and three other youths who were found guilty of first-degree murder and sentenced to life without the possibility of parole in California, even though three of them never touched the weapon. Budnick sent the article to a producer who optioned it for a documentary film called Reckless Indifference.

In 2003, Budnick began volunteering at the Barry J. Nidorf Juvenile Hall in Sylmar, California. Budnick was a volunteer teacher for a group called InsideOUT Writers. As of 2014, Budnick still volunteers at the Nidorf Juvenile Hall. After this experience and others, Budnick began to tell administrators and politicians about the problems he was seeing in the juvenile justice and criminal justice systems. After the success of Budnick's The Hangover franchise, Budnick was able to leverage the work he does for incarcerated juveniles. Jake Gyllenhaal went with Budnick to the Sylmar juvenile detention center, to Men's Central Jail and out to California State Prison, Los Angeles County.

In 2012, Budnick was named California's Volunteer of Year by Governor Jerry Brown for a program he envisioned. After seeing kids desperate to change their lives but unable to because of California law at that time, Budnick and others launched a pilot program out of Los Angeles County where every single kid coming into the prison system—if they are doing the right things on their own—got to go to a place where they could get their high school diploma or GED, go to college classes, learn a trade, and be in self-help programs and substance-abuse programs. In 2013, the program was adopted statewide.

== Founding ==
Budnick began to see many of the kids he worked with—in some of his college programs—come out of prison and going into universities, community colleges, and obtaining employment. Budnick saw a network of ex-offenders and ex-gang-members who were changing their lives. Then, Budnick and others started doing retreats where the formerly incarcerated young people would meet with mentors and lawyers, and eventually formed a private Facebook page where they organized events and provided support.

In 2013, Budnick officially launched the Anti-Recidivism Coalition (ARC), a formal organization of formerly-incarcerated young adults who work to support one another, and that also aims to lower the number of people flowing into the criminal justice system through policy advocacy and community organizing. Budnick said "I started to see that there was not an organization out there that had high-achieving guys coming out of prison who could articulate why hope is important and why kids deserve a second chance and why kids are different from adults."

As of 2015 Robert Downey Jr. was serving on the board of the ARC. In 2019, Sam Lewis was appointed executive director of Anti-Recidivism Coalition.

=== Support network ===
ARC serves as a support network and a connection to services for over one hundred formerly incarcerated individuals. Members must commit to live crime-free, gang-free, drug-free, in school or working, and in service to their community. ARC provides support through mentoring, case management, internship and employment opportunities, regular support network meetings and social outings. Members receive mentoring from professional adult volunteers, known as ARC Allies, and through ARC’s Leadership Council that includes formerly incarcerated youth who are now university graduates, lawyers, engineers, politicians and other successful professionals. ARC host retreats for members of the ARC network.

=== Policy advocacy ===
ARC’s policy reform advocacy is conducted by formerly incarcerated individuals who have successfully transformed their lives. In 2014, ARC teamed up with the Ford Foundation and others to host a TEDx conference inside Ironwood State Prison with hundreds in attendance. ARC produced a documentary about the event. Prophet Walker, a founding member of ARC, was a guest of Michelle Obama's at the 2015 State of the Union. After serving a six-year prison sentence, Walker sought to strengthen the bond between police officers and inner-city residents. ARC's Budnick writes about criminal justice policy for the Huffington Post. ARC successfully advocated for California Senate Bill 260, which guarantees that offenders who received long sentences as juveniles have the opportunity to be considered for parole.

In 2015, James Anderson, a formerly incarcerated young man and first founding staff of ARC, spoke alongside John Legend in Sacramento about criminal justice reform. With the help of ARC, Anderson was accepted into UCLA. Anderson has met personally with President Barack Obama.

== Supporters and funding ==
Robert Downey Jr., Brent Bolthouse, Dede Gardner, Jake Gyllenhaal, Hill Harper, Bruce Karatz, and Damon Lindelof, among others, serve on the board of directors. Major donors have included the California Endowment, the California Wellness Foundation and the Conrad N. Hilton Foundation. Ben Lear, Common, Jonah Hill, Mike Tollin, Nasir Jones, Raul Ruiz, Tony Cardenas, and Zach Galifianakis, among others, serve on ARC's Advisory Board.
