= Shanghai Red =

2006 film directed by Oscar L. Costo

- Directed by: Oscar L. Costo
- Written by: Oscar L. Costo
- Produced by: Oscar L. Costo; Vivian Wu
- Starring: Vivian Wu; Richard Burgi
- Cinematography: Adam Kane
- Edited by: Josh Muscatine
- Music by: Randy Miller
- Production companies: Shanghai Film Group; MARdeORO Films
- Distributed by: Indican Pictures
- Release dates: 27 August 2006 (Montreal World Film Festival); 29 April 2007 (China)
- Running time: 118 minutes
- Countries: United States; China
- Languages: English; Mandarin

Shanghai Red (Chinese: 红美丽) is a 2006 Chinese-American thriller-drama film directed by Oscar L. Costo, starring Vivian Wu and Richard Burgi.

== Cast ==
- Vivian Wu as Zhu Mei Li
- Richard Burgi as Michael Johnson
- Sun Honglei as Lawyer
- Ge You as Mr. Feng
- Kenny Bee as Lian Wei
- Tong Zhengwei as Wei Ma
- Monica Mok as Ma Fang
- Roger Yuan as Mr. Lee

== Release ==
The film premiered at the Montreal World Film Festival on 27 August 2006.

== Reception ==
Ronnie Scheib of Variety praised the performances of Wu and Sun, and wrote that the film "provides its own correctives, taking unexpected detours at all the plot’s weakest, most predictable moments, and thereby defusing action-movie cliches."

Gary Goldstein of the Los Angeles Times wrote that Costo "effectively tells the film’s carefully unfolding story in flashbacks", while Kane's "rich" cinematographer "vividly captures a mostly sleek and seductive Shanghai".

Maggie Lee of The Hollywood Reporter wrote that "any attempt at psychological penetration is distracted by all the action, suspense, romance and Shanghai city tours that fill up the film’s running time."
