= Vivian Wu =

Chinese actress (born 1966)

- 邬君梅
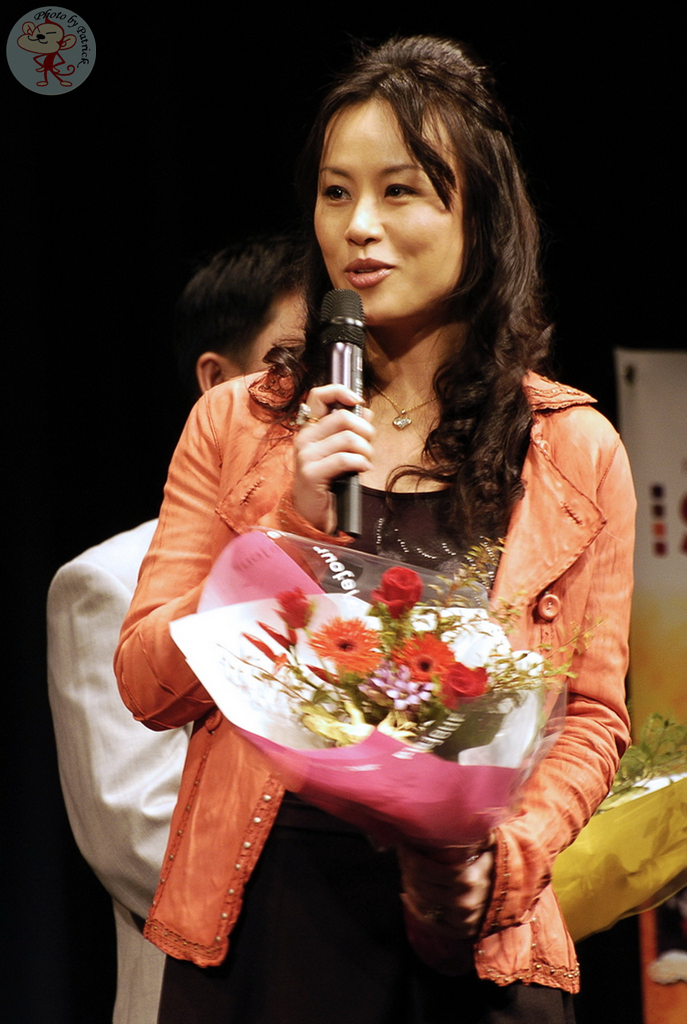
- Wu in 2007
- Born: Wu Junmei; February 5, 1966 (age 60); Shanghai, China
- Citizenship: United States
- Occupation: Actress
- Years active: 1981–present
- Spouse: Oscar Luis Costo (m. 1994)

Chinese name
- Traditional Chinese: 鄔君梅
- Simplified Chinese: 邬君梅
Transcriptions
Standard Mandarin
- Hanyu Pinyin: Wū Jūnméi
- IPA: [ú tɕýn.měɪ]

Vivian Wu (née Wu Junmei; Chinese: 邬君梅; born February 5, 1966) is a Chinese-born American actress. Starring in a variety of North American and Chinese productions, her big break came in 1987, when she appeared in the biographical film The Last Emperor. She later went to starring in films Iron & Silk (1990), The Guyver (1991), Heaven & Earth (1993), Teenage Mutant Ninja Turtles III (1993), The Joy Luck Club (1993), and most notably playing the leading roles in The Pillow Book (1996) and The Soong Sisters (1997). In 2020, she starred as Dr. Lu Wang in the Netflix science fiction drama series Away, while in 2023, she portrayed Vivian Zhu in the Apple TV+ murder mystery comedy series The Afterparty.

== Early life ==
Wu Junmei was born in Shanghai, China. Wu is the daughter of Zhu Manfang, one of the leading actresses in China during the 1940s and 1950s. She attended Shanghai Shixi High School and began acting at the age of 16 in Shanghai Film Studio. In 1987, she attended the Hawaii Pacific University, studying tourism.

== Career ==
In 1985, Wu was given an audition for the role of Wenxiu in Bernardo Bertolucci's 1987 film The Last Emperor. Six months later, she was chosen for the role, making her big screen debut. Wu went on to star in the drama film Shadow of China (1989), directed and co-written by Mitsuo Yanagimachi, followed by the action comedy Iron & Silk (1990). The following year, she appeared in the poorly received superhero comedy film The Guyver with Mark Hamill. She was chosen by People as one of The 50 Most Beautiful People in the World in 1990.

Wu gained some critical acclaim after appearing in The Joy Luck Club (1993), directed by Wayne Wang, and playing the leading role in the erotic drama film The Pillow Book (1996). Wu also played Mitsu in the 1993 film Teenage Mutant Ninja Turtles III. She portrayed the historical figure of Soong Mei-ling in the films The Soong Sisters (1997) and The Founding of a Republic (2009), as well as the 2011 television series Departed Heroes. As May-Lin Eng in Eve and the Fire Horse (2005), Wu received a Genie Award nomination.

Beside films, Wu has worked in television, making guest appearances in shows such as The Untouchables, L.A. Law, Tales from the Crypt, Highlander: The Series, JAG, Murder, She Wrote, F/X: The Series, ER, and Ghost Whisperer. She was one of the original four judges of Hunan TV's World's Got Talent.

Wu also starred in the live action video game Supreme Warrior (1994) and appeared in the video game Indiana Jones and the Emperor's Tomb as Mei Ying.

In 2020, Wu made her return to Hollywood productions after nearly 25 years with a starring role as Chinese astronaut Lu Wang in the Netflix science fiction drama Away opposite Hilary Swank.

== Personal life ==
Wu married Cuban-born American director and producer Oscar Luis Costo in 1994. She later became a United States citizen.

== Filmography ==
=== Film ===
- The Last Emperor (1987)
- Iron & Silk (1990)
- Shadow of China (1990)
- The Guyver (1991)
- Heaven & Earth (1993)
- Teenage Mutant Ninja Turtles III (1993) as Mitsu
- The Joy Luck Club (1993)
- Vanishing Son (TV) (1994)
- Woman Rose (1996)
- The Pillow Book (1996)
- The Soong Sisters (1997)
- A Bright Shining Lie (1998) (TV Film)
- The Legend of Pig Eye (1998)
- Blindness (1998)
- 8½ Women (1999)
- Dinner Rush (2000)
- Roses Are Red (2000)
- Red Skies (2002)
- Encrypt (2003)
- Beauty Remains (2005)
- Kinamand (2005)
- Eve and the Fire Horse (2005)
- Shanghai Red (2006)
- Desires of the Heart (2008)
- The Founding of a Republic (2009)
- Shanghai Blue (2010)
- Snow Flower and the Secret Fan (2011)
- The Story of a Piano (2011)
- Departed Heroes (2011)
- To Forgive (2012)
- Judge Zhan (2012)
- The Palace (2013)
- Feed Me (2013)
- Who is Undercover (2014)
- Perfect Couple (2014)
- The Queens (2015)
- Go Lala Go 2 (2015)
- Everybody's Fine (2016)
- Youth Dinner (2017)
- The Chinese Widow (2017)
- Father and Son (2017)
- Cry Me a Sad River (2018)
- Knockout (2019)
- Dead Pigs (2019)
- Slanted (2025)

=== TV series ===
- Millennium - "Siren" (1998)
- Dwelling Narrowness (2009)
- Strange World (1999 - 2000)
- Highlander: The Series (1994) May-Ling Shen
- Secret Agent Man (2000) "Uncle SAM" Ling #1
- JAG “Deja Vu” (1995) Angelique Sonsiri
- Tales from the Crypt "Comes the Dawn" (1995) Jeri Drumbeater
- Murder She Wrote "Kendo Killing" (4 Jan 1996) Miko Ishida
- The First Half of My Life (2017)
- Ruyi's Royal Love in the Palace (2018)
- Qin Dynasty Epic (2019)
- Away (2020)
- Station 19 (2021)
- Irma Vep (2022)
- The Afterparty (2023)
- A Better Life (2025)

=== Video games ===
- Supreme Warrior (1995) as Yu Ching
- Indiana Jones and the Emperor's Tomb (2003)
