= Wang Zhiwen =

Chinese actor

Wang Zhiwen (Chinese: 王志文; pinyin: Wáng Zhìwén, born June 25, 1966) is a Chinese actor born in Shanghai, China. He was selected by for his acting abilities at an early age and began to pursue a career in acting that has flourished in recent years, culminating in his role in Chen Kaige's Together. He also starred in the 2006 film A Battle of Wits as the King of Liang and the 2004 film Ai Zuozhan where he played Wah. In 2000, he became the first Chinese actor to win the "Grand Slam", after winning "Best Actor" at the three biggest Chinese-language television awards including the Feitian Award, the Golden Eagle Award and the Magnolia Award.

== Selected filmography ==
Year	English title	Chinese title	Role	Notes
1989	A Secret Cover	秘密采访	Mai Kefeng	
1991	Frustrated Childhood	风雨故园	Mr. Zhiling	
1994	Blush	红粉	Lao Pu	
1995	Weekend Lover	周末情人	Lala	
1995	Flying Tigers	飞虎队	Zhang Lan	
1997	Eighteen Springs	半生缘	Yu Jin	
1997	Feels Like Spring	像春天一样	Xiao Liang	Television film
1998	The Emperor and the Assassin	荊柯刺秦王	Marquis Changxin	
2000	Superconductor			
2001	The Marriage Certificate	谁说我不在乎		
2002	Together	和你在一起	Professor Jiang	Hundred Flowers Award for Best Supporting Actor
2002	On the Other Side of the Bridge	芬妮的微笑	Ma Yunlong	
2005	Beauty Remains		Mr. Huang	
2005	Gimme Kudos	求求你表扬我	Gu Guoge	
2006	The Obscure	小说		
2006	A Battle of Wits	墨攻	The King of Liang	
2007	Brothers	兄弟	Tam Shun Tin	
2007	Fuwa	福娃	Ares	Voice role
2009	Wheat	麦田	Lord Chong	
2009	The Message	风声	Wang Daoxiang	
2009	Visitors from the Sui Dynasty	隋朝来客		
2014	The Golden Era			
2014	Gone with the Bullets			
2017	Love Education			
2018	The Way We Were	归去来	Shu Wang	
2019	English			
