= Steal This Movie! =

- Theatrical release poster
- Directed by: Robert Greenwald
- Written by: Marty Jezer; Bruce Graham
- Produced by: Jon Avnet; Ken Christmas; Vincent D'Onofrio
- Starring: Vincent D'Onofrio; Janeane Garofalo; Jeanne Tripplehorn; Kevin Corrigan; Donal Logue; Panou
- Cinematography: Denis Lenoir
- Edited by: Kimberly Ray
- Music by: Mader
- Production companies: Ardent Films; Greenlight Productions; Lakeshore International; Robert Greenwald Productions
- Distributed by: Lions Gate Films
- Release dates: March 4, 2000 (Santa Barbara); August 18, 2000 (United States)
- Running time: 107 minutes
- Country: United States
- Language: English
- Box office: $76,424

Steal This Movie! is a 2000 American biographical film directed by Robert Greenwald and written by Bruce Graham, based on the 1976 book To America with Love: Letters From the Underground by Anita and Abbie Hoffman and the 1992 book Abbie Hoffman: American Rebel by Marty Jezer. The film follows 1960s radical figure Abbie Hoffman, and stars Vincent D'Onofrio and Janeane Garofalo, with Jeanne Tripplehorn and Kevin Pollak.

The film follows Hoffman's (D'Onofrio) relationship with his second wife Anita (Garofalo) and their "awakening" and subsequent conversion to an activist life. The title of the film is a play on Hoffman's 1971 counter-culture guidebook titled Steal This Book.

Steal This Movie! premiered at the 2000 Santa Barbara Film Festival, and also showed at the South by Southwest Film Festival.

== Cast ==
- Vincent D'Onofrio as Abbie Hoffman
- Janeane Garofalo as Anita Hoffman
- Jeanne Tripplehorn as Johanna Lawrenson
- Kevin Pollak as Gerry Lefcourt
- Donal Logue as Stew Albert
- Kevin Corrigan as Jerry Rubin
- Alan Van Sprang as David Glenn
- Troy Garity as Tom Hayden (father of Troy Garity)
- Michael Cera as america Hoffman (age 7)
- Ingrid Veninger as Judy Albert
- Stephen Marshall as Louis Wertzel
- Joyce Gordon as Florence Hoffman
- Bernard Kay as John Hoffman
- Jean Daigle as Sheriff
- Johnie Chase as Josh
- Toni Ellwand as Mother

== Reception ==
On review aggregator website Rotten Tomatoes, the film holds an approval rating of 51% based on 43 reviews, and an average rating of 4.7/10. The site's critical consensus reads, "D'Onofrio's performance fails to do justice to Hoffman, and the depiction of the 60s also rings false." On Metacritic, the film has a weighted average score of 36 out of 100, based on 26 critics, indicating "generally unfavorable reviews".

Some criticism of the film is that it is hagiographic of Abbie Hoffman and fails to give proper credit to other activists of the era like Paul Krassner, who co-founded the Yippies with Hoffman and his wife. Other critics disliked the film's editing, which frequently relied upon the use of documentary footage, voiceovers, and subtitles to help advance the plot. However, nearly all film reviewers agreed that the strong acting performance of Vincent D'Onofrio as Hoffman overcame the film's otherwise minor flaws and modest budget.

In September 2000, america Hoffman, son of Abbie and Anita, filed suit against Lions Gate Films in an attempt to block further distribution of the film, accusing the film-makers of invasion of privacy and presenting an "unauthorized, false and uncomplimentary portrayal" of him as a child. In the suit, america protested his portrayal in the film as "a wimpy, quiet, sulking and effeminate 'mama's boy,'" and accused film-makers of implying america "may be a homosexual." Hoffman later dropped the suit and retracted his claims against the film-makers, stating "I understand that the filmmaker's characterization of me and my relationship to my father was made in good faith and with honorable intentions."

== See also ==
- Conspiracy: The Trial of the Chicago 8 (1987 film)
- Chicago 10 (2007 film)
- William Kunstler: Disturbing the Universe (2009 documentary)
- The Chicago 8 (2011 film)
- The Trial of the Chicago 7 (2020 film)
