= To America with Love =

1976 book by Anita and Abbie Hoffman

To America with Love: Letters from the Underground is a 1976 book by Anita and Abbie Hoffman. It was part of the basis for the film Steal This Movie! in 2000.

== Editions ==
- New York: Stonehill Pub. Co.: [distributed by G. Braziller], c1976. ISBN 0-88373-044-8 (1st edition), ISBN 0-88373-052-9) paperback reprint)
