= Central Juvenile Hall =

Youth detention center in Los Angeles County

Coordinates: 34.0641°N 118.2072°W

- Interactive map of Central Juvenile Hall
- Location: Lincoln Heights, Los Angeles
- Status: Operational
- Opened: 1921
- Managed by: Los Angeles County Probation Department

Central Juvenile Hall (also known as Eastlake Juvenile Hall or Central) is a youth detention center in Los Angeles County. Central houses both boys and girls. The Central Juvenile Hall complex was originally established in 1912 as the first juvenile detention facility in Los Angeles County. The hall sits on twenty-two and one-half acres of land in Lincoln Heights, Los Angeles. The facility has 24 buildings including living units, two infirmaries, two school buildings, two gyms, kitchen facilities, a chapel, and mechanical areas.

== Conditions ==
In 2014, the Los Angeles County Grand Jury criticized the conditions of the hall, and proposed that it be torn down. Into 2016, juvenile justice reform advocates pushed a proposal that would split the Los Angeles County Probation Department in two parts, one for overseeing juveniles and one for adults.

One former Central ward wrote about his experience in solitary confinement in 1962. Into the 2000s, former inmates recalled being placed in solitary confinement at Central.

== Programs ==
In 1997, Sister Janet Harris, then Catholic Chaplain at Central, cofounded InsideOUT Writers (IOW). The organization uses creative writing to encourage personal growth and transformation within the California juvenile justice system and still teaches writing workshops inside Central. Mark Salzman taught for IOW at Central, and wrote a book about his experience. In 2011, IOW teamed with the Los Angeles Opera to perform stories written by incarcerated youths at Central.

In 2012, rap artist RZA spoke to teen fathers at Central. UpRising Yoga has held yoga classes for boys and girls incarcerated at Central.

In 2016, Center for the Empowerment of Families (CEF) Executive Director, Renee Curry, introduced the first Therapeutic Ballet-Mentorship program. The Dance for Healing Project was developed by Renee and Jamie Hammond-Carbetta, Pony Box Theatre's Choreographer. A dance program model the two first created in 2014, it includes all genres of dance for incarcerated girls and boys identified as impacted by trauma experiences. Namely youth previously affected by sex trafficking, domestic violence, neglect & caregiver substance abuse. The program includes coping skills continuance monitoring and mentorship upon release. CEF Mentors Cambreisha Montgomery, Akwi Devine & CEF's Board Member Roz Freeman, are also responsible for the innovation and functionality of this mentorship program. Mentors and the dance instructors are survivors, yet many hold Masters in Public Health, Masters in Counseling Psychology; or Fine Arts degrees in Dance.

CEF is 10 year nonprofit provider for therapeutic programming at LA County Probation facilities, and it is also responsible for RZA's visit to Juvenile Hall through its Fatherhood program developed by Dr. Sharon Jacques-Rabb.

== Notable juvenile inmates ==
- Jonah Deocampo, rapper better known as "Bambu"; arrested for robbery at 16 and served 2 years
- Stanley Williams (1953-2005), Crips gang member and spree killer; did stints in Central
