= Beauty Remains (film) =

2005 Chinese-Hong Kong American film by Ann Hu

- Directed by: Ann Hu
- Written by: Michael Eldridge; Beth Schacter; Wang Bin; Liu Weibing
- Produced by: Ira Deutchman; Ann Hu; Song Zhenshan; Joshua A. Green; Han Sanping; Nina Wang; Lisa Lu
- Starring: Zhou Xun; Vivian Wu; Wang Zhiwen
- Cinematography: Scott Kevan
- Edited by: Fritz Donnelly
- Music by: Sasha Gordon
- Production companies: China Film Group Corporation; Chinachem; Emerging Pictures; Media Asia Films; Shanghai Film Group
- Distributed by: Emerging Pictures; Film1 (Netherlands)
- Release dates: 14 February 2005 (China); 17 March 2006 (Cleveland); 19 September 2007 (New York, United States)
- Running time: 87 minutes
- Countries: China; Hong Kong; United States
- Language: Mandarin

Beauty Remains (Chinese: 美人依旧) is a 2005 Chinese-language drama film directed by Ann Hu, starring Zhou Xun, Vivian Wu and Wang Zhiwen. The film had its North American premiere at the Cleveland International Film Festival on March 17, 2006.

== Plot ==
Fei (played by Zhou Xun), who has been away from home for fifteen years, is returned home by his half-sister Yingzi (played by Vivian Wu) due to his father's will. Since she was a youngster, Xiaofei had vowed to be a promising woman because of her mother's impoverished upbringing. Her sister's aristocratic demeanor, on the other hand, was full of temptations for Fei. Fei eventually grew accustomed to her sister's presence. It appears that I have rediscovered my sense of belonging. When Fei discovered that her sister only planned to use her to gain the fortune and then travel abroad with her lover Mr. Huang (played by Wang Zhiwen), she was devastated. She didn't want to be separated from her sister or her home. At this point, the uncertainty exhibited by the emotional Mr. Huang provided Xiaofei with a chance for retaliation. However, vengeance and desire did not provide her with the satisfaction she had hoped for.

== Cast ==
- Zhou Xun as Zhang Fei
- Vivian Wu as Yingzi
- Wang Zhiwen as Mr. Huang
- Lisa Lu as Woman Gambler
- Zhu Manfang as Bai
- Shen Chang as Xiao Tian
- Ju Xue
- Shen Yuqian as Miss Bai
- Wang Jianjun
- Yang Lixin
- Xu Xiyan
- Liu Mengyi

== Reception ==
Matt Zoller Seitz of The New York Times wrote that Kevan's cinematography "contributes to the sense that these hot-blooded characters are frozen by family obligations, social status and the changes unfolding beyond their bedroom walls." Len Klady of Screen Daily wrote that "The specificity of the setting instils a potent dramatic context but ultimately the universality of the emotional terrain is so rich and textured that borders blur and a vibrant heart survives that should provide this international co-production with ample global access." Frank Lovece of Film Journal International wrote that while the ending is "inexplicable", the film's "tapestry and matrix of confused emotions is as breathtaking as the period fashions and as breathless as, well, Breathless."

Elizabeth Weitzman of the New York Daily News rated the film 2 stars and called it "overwrought" but "beautifully atmospheric". Robert Koehler of Variety called the film "unappealing" and "stiff". Aaron Hillis of The Village Voice wrote that the film "plays like the work of a fifth-generation Chinese hack faking a lavish Hollywood saga on an indie budget".
