= Iron & Silk =

1986 novel by Mark Salzman

- First edition
- Author: Mark Salzman
- Language: English
- Genre: Biography
- Publisher: Random House
- Publication place: Canada
- English publication date: 1986
- ISBN: 0-394-55156-7

Iron and Silk is a 1986 autobiographical novel written by Mark Salzman. It describes his experiences in China as an English teacher and as a student of Kung Fu. The book was later made into a film of the same name.

== Plot summary ==
Salzman, a member of the Yale-China expedition crew, is offered a position to teach English at the Changsha Medical University for two years. While he is there, he learns Chinese martial arts of many different kinds. He studies from the martial arts master Pan Qingfu.

He encounters political activists, travels, and deals with many different kinds of people, some of them very traditional.
