= Abbie Hoffman: American Rebel =

1982 book by Martin Jezer

- Author: Marty Jezer
- Publisher: Rutgers University Press
- Publication date: 1992
- Pages: 345
- ISBN: 978-0-8135-1850-3
- LC Class: HN90.R3H58

Abbie Hoffman: American Rebel is a biography of radical Abbie Hoffman, by Marty Jezer. It was published in 1992 by Rutgers University Press. Los Angeles Times reviewer Jonathan Kirsch, noting that Jezer had been Hoffman's "cohort" and "a veteran of 'the Woodstock Nation'", found the book to be "sympathetic but curiously aloof" and opined that it did not succeed in getting "behind the mask of comedy that Hoffman invariably presented to the world." The New York Times reviewer Todd Gitlin called the book "a solid account of the life of an inventive, destructive luftmensch, and a valuable cautionary tale for both the left and the right." Entertainment Weekly said it was "a sympathetic history of a maligned decade" that "details Hoffman's humor, manic energy, depressive spells, political skills, and above all, his incurable and still contagious optimism" and gave the book an "A" grade.

The book later served as source material for the 2000 Hoffman biopic, Steal This Movie!
