= Mark Salzman =

American writer (born 1959)

- Born: Mark Joseph Salzman; December 3, 1959 (age 66); Greenwich, Connecticut, U.S.
- Education: Yale University
- Occupations: Writer; actor; cellist
- Spouse: Jessica Yu
- Children: 2
- Writing career
- Notable work: Iron & Silk

Mark Joseph Salzman (born December 3, 1959, in Greenwich, Connecticut) is an American writer. Salzman is best known for his 1986 memoir Iron & Silk, which describes his experiences living in China as an English teacher in the early 1980s.

Salzman grew up in Ridgefield, Connecticut, the oldest child of a piano teacher mother and a social worker father. He studied Chinese Language and Literature at Yale University. He graduated Phi Beta Kappa, summa cum laude in 1982 and spent the next two years in Changsha, Hunan, teaching English at Hunan Medical College and studying martial arts with Pan Qingfu, a Chinese martial arts teacher and kung fu movie actor. His experiences in China are recounted in his first book, Iron & Silk: A young American encounters swordsmen, bureaucrats and other citizens of contemporary China, published in 1986. Salzman received several literary awards for Iron & Silk. The book was made into a 1990 film of the same title. Salzman wrote the screenplay and starred as himself in the film. Though the real venue of the story was in Changsha, the film was shot in Hangzhou, Zhejiang, China.

Salzman plays the cello. In high school, he played the cello for the Norwalk Youth Symphony. In 1996, he performed as guest cellist with YoYo Ma, pianist Emmanuel Ax, and others at Alice Tully Hall for the 20th anniversary performance of Live From Lincoln Center.

After receiving his 2000 Guggenheim Fellowship, Mark Salzman spent time as a stay-at-home parent. Salzman, along with three other men, was featured in the 2007 documentary Protagonist, directed by his wife, Jessica Yu. In 2011 he presented a multimedia monologue, An Atheist in Freefall, at the New York Public Library as part of the exhibition Three Faiths: Judaism, Christianity, Islam.

Salzman continued writing fiction and nonfiction after Iron and Silk. These include a memoir on growing up in suburbia, and one on his work as a creative writing instructor for juvenile delinquents. The most recent is his 2012 memoir, The Man in the Empty Boat, about his search for equanimity after personal catastrophes, which included his sister's untimely death and his own nervous breakdown. Common to his later works is a theme of struggling to reach an ideal but falling short, and the quiet changes within a person who faces the possibility of never achieving their goal. Salzman continues to perform the cello; in January 2020 he and his daughter gave a benefit performance for the Hakone Foundation, in Saratoga California.

Salzman and his wife Jessica Yu, a fellow Yale graduate and an Academy Award-winning filmmaker, have two daughters. The family makes their home in Southern California.

== Works by Salzman ==
- Iron & Silk (1986), ISBN 0-394-55156-7
- The Laughing Sutra (1991)
- The Soloist (1994)
- Lost in Place: Growing Up Absurd in Suburbia (1995)
- Lying Awake (2000)
- True Notebooks (2003), a book about his experience as a writing teacher in Central Juvenile Hall, as well as the inmates and their writing
- The Man in the Empty Boat (2012), about his struggles with anxiety and writer's block.
