= Anita Hoffman =

American activist, writer, and prankster (1942–1998)

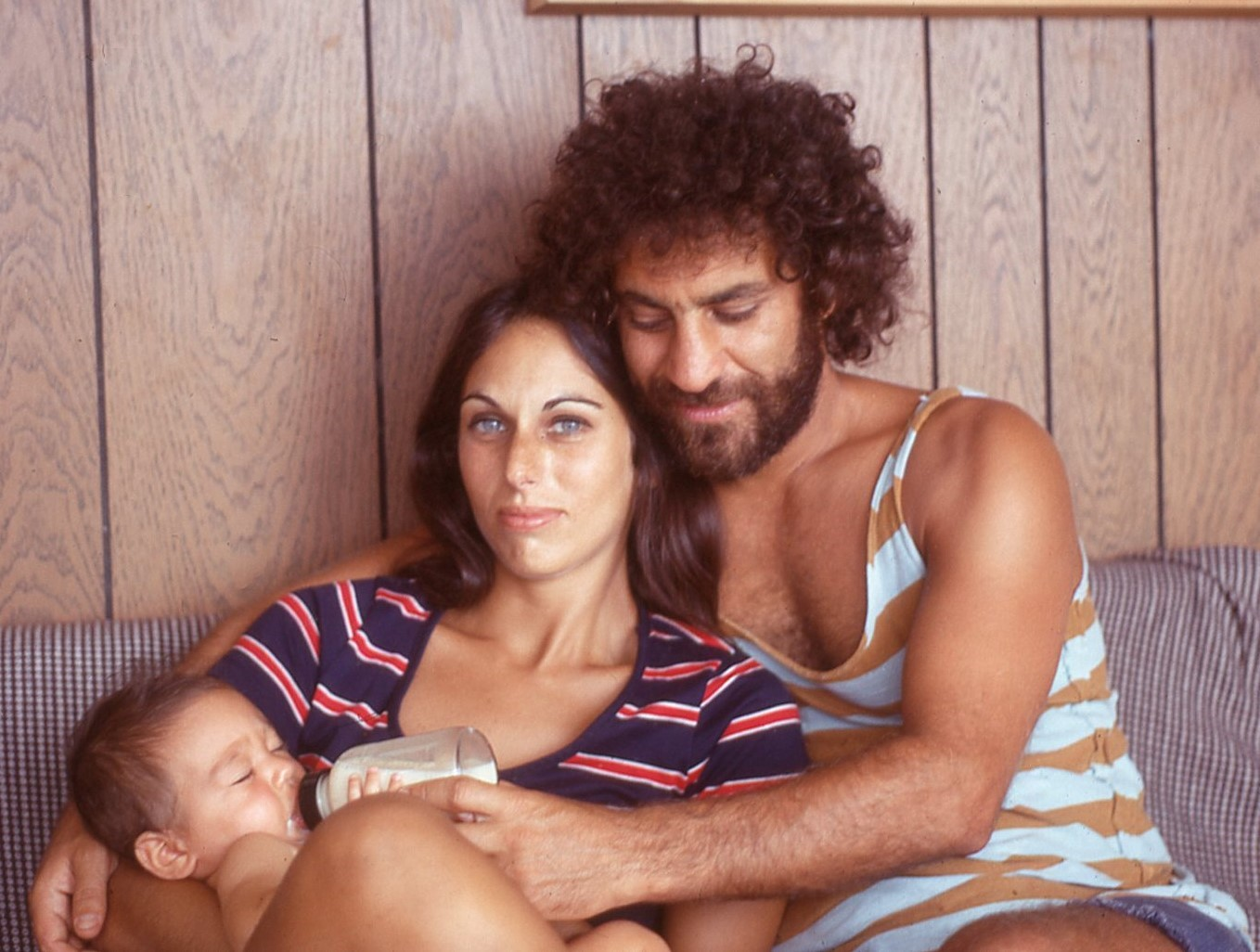
Anita Hoffman (center) in 1972 with husband Abbie Hoffman and son america Hoffman

Anita Hoffman (née Kushner, March 16, 1942 – December 27, 1998) was an American Yippie activist, writer, prankster, and the wife of Abbie Hoffman.

Hoffman helped her husband plan some of the most memorable pranks of the Yippie movement. She supported Abbie Hoffman during his time underground while raising their son, america (deliberately stylized with a lowercase a) Hoffman.

Hoffman edited a book published in 1976 of letters she and Abbie had written to each other from April 1974 through early March 1975 while Abbie was "underground" to avoid a prison sentence for allegedly selling cocaine, titled To America with Love: Letters From the Underground. She also authored the novel Trashing, which she wrote under the pseudonym Ann Fettamen.

According to CNN, in "one of her most audacious moves, she went on a sort of diplomatic mission to Algeria to meet with Black Panther leader Eldridge Cleaver, and try to forge a coalition between the Panthers and the Yippies."

She died of breast cancer on December 27, 1998, aged 56.

Her life was dramatized in the 2000 film Steal This Movie, in which she was portrayed by Janeane Garofalo.
