= Scott Budnick (film producer) =

American film producer

Scott Budnick is an American film producer whose work includes serving as one of the executive producers of The Hangover (2009), the highest-grossing R-rated comedy of all time.

He is also noteworthy for his efforts as a volunteer in California State prisons and advocacy on behalf of prisoners, and he was awarded the 2012 California Governor's Volunteer of the Year for his efforts. He founded the Anti-Recidivism Coalition.

== Early life and education ==
Budnick grew up in Atlanta and graduated Woodward Academy in 1995. He attended Emory University graduating in 1999 with a Bachelor of Business Administration and a B.A. in Film.

== Work as a producer ==
Budnick was former executive Vice President of Todd Phillips' Green Hat Films. He produced Old School, Due Date, The Hangover, The Hangover Part II, War Dogs and Just Mercy.

He is currently CEO of One Community, LLC – a film, television, and new media co-financing company which encourages positive change. He was executive producer of Just Mercy under the One Community banner.

== Anti-Recidivism Coalition ==
In 1997, Budnick became interested in juveniles in prison after reading a Rolling Stone article about Brandon Hein and three other youths who were found guilty of first-degree murder and sentenced to life without the possibility of parole in California, even though three of them never touched the weapon. Budnick sent the article to a producer who optioned it for a documentary film called Reckless Indifference.

In 2003, Budnick began volunteering at the Barry J. Nidorf Juvenile Hall in Sylmar, California as a volunteer teacher for a group called InsideOUT Writers. After this experience and others, Budnick began to tell administrators and politicians about the problems he was seeing in the juvenile justice and criminal justice systems. After the success of The Hangover franchise, Budnick was able to leverage the work he does for incarcerated juveniles. Jake Gyllenhaal went with Budnick to the Sylmar juvenile detention center, to Men's Central Jail and out to California State Prison, Los Angeles County.

In 2012, Budnick was named California's Volunteer of Year by Governor Jerry Brown for a program he envisioned. After seeing young people desperate to change their lives but unable to because of California law at that time, Budnick and others launched a pilot program in Los Angeles County where every young person coming into the prison system were able to get their high school diploma or GED, go to college classes, learn a trade, and be in self-help programs and substance-abuse programs. In 2013, the program was adopted statewide.

Many of the young people came out of prison and went to university, community college, or gained employment. Budnick saw a network of ex-offenders and ex-gang-members who were changing their lives. Then, Budnick and others started holding retreats where formerly incarcerated young people would meet with mentors and lawyers, and eventually formed a private Facebook page where they organized events and provided support.

In 2013, Budnick officially launched the Anti-Recidivism Coalition, an organization of formerly-incarcerated young adults who work to support one another, and which also aims to lower the number of people entering the criminal justice system through policy advocacy and community organizing. Budnick said "I started to see that there was not an organization out there that had high-achieving guys coming out of prison who could articulate why hope is important and why kids deserve a second chance and why kids are different from adults."

For his work with youth, Budnick was selected as a board member for Barack Obama's foundation, the My Brother's Keeper Alliance.

== Filmography ==
- The Hangover (2009) — executive producer
- The Hangover Part II (2011) — producer
- War Dogs (2016) - producer
- Just Mercy (2019) — executive producer
