= Iron & Silk (film) =

1991 film

- Directed by: Shirley Sun
- Screenplay by: Mark Salzman
- Based on: Iron & Silk by Mark Salzman
- Produced by: Shirley Sun
- Starring: Mark Salzman; Pan Qingfu; Vivian Wu; Jeanette Lin Tsui
- Cinematography: James Hayman
- Edited by: James Y. Kwei; Geraldine Peroni
- Music by: Michael Gibbs
- Production companies: SUN-Productions; Tokyo Broadcasting System
- Distributed by: Prestige Films (United States); Cineplex Odeon Films (Canada)
- Release dates: January 20, 1990 (Sundance Film Festival); February 15, 1991 (New York City)
- Running time: 101 minutes
- Country: United States
- Language: English

Iron & Silk is a 1990 American action comedy-drama based on the eponymous book by American writer Mark Salzman. It details his journey to China after college to study Chinese wu shu, better known in the west as kung fu, and to teach English. Though not trained as an actor, Salzman starred as himself, as did Pan Qingfu, who claimed no one else could portray him on film. Salzman's experiences occurred in Changsha, Hunan, though the film was shot in Hangzhou, Zhejiang. The film was directed by Shirley Sun, and was the editorial debut for Geraldine Peroni.

== Plot ==
Mark Franklin arrives in Hangzhou, China to teach Chinese teachers the English language. He learns the refinements of correct behavior among Chinese people, makes friends with his pupils, falls in love with the young doctor Ming, learns wushu (Chinese martial arts) from the famous teacher Pan... but also learns about political repression, especially when he's forbidden contact with some of his friends.

== Cast ==
=== Main cast ===
- Mark Salzman as Mark Franklin
- Vivian Wu as Ming
- Pan Qingfu as himself, a martial arts master
- Jeanette Lin Tsui as Teacher Hei
- Sun Xudong as Sinbad

=== Others ===
- To Funglin as Old Sheep
- Hu Yun as Fatty Du
- Dong Hangcheng as Teacher Cai
- Lu Zhiquan as Teacher Li
- Xiao Ying as April
- Yang Xiru as Dr. Wang
- Zhuang Genyuan as Teacher Xu
- Jiang Xihong as Teacher Zhang
- He Saifei as the Yue opera performer who played Madame White Snake
- Xia Saili (He Saifei's sister) as the Yue opera performer who played Xu Xian
- Chen Huiling as the Yue opera performer who played Xiaoqing

== Reception ==
The movie gained mostly positive reviews, ranging from a "modest charmer; a true sleeper" to "unsophisticated [and] bittersweet". The movie was met with some criticism, ranging from "an unhappy teenager's fantasy of finally fitting in" to "we're talking geekarama here".
