= Pan Qingfu =

Chinese martial artist

Pan Qingfu (Chinese: 潘清福; 9 May 1936 – 30 June 2017), also known as Grandmaster Pan, was a Chinese martial artist.

Grandmaster Pan's awards include a Hall of Fame award from the United International Kung Fu Federation, a Hall of Fame Award from the World Christian Martial Arts Federation, the International Legend Hall of Fame award from the USA Wushu Kung Fu Federation and a Hall of Fame Award from Black Belt magazine. He was the Honorary President of the United Wushu Federation of Canada. In 2002, he was honored with a special ceremony where he became the only person ever conferred with a Level 10 degree, from the Confederation of Canadian Wushu Organizations, an organization that only has 9 levels. Grandmaster Pan won the Chinese national Kung-Fu championships multiple times, and served as a coach at the Shenyang Physical Education Institute. In the mid-1960s, Pan was recruited by the Chinese government to capture Triad leaders, eventually capturing 23, and earning the name "Gangbuster". He also worked as an instructor for the Beijing Police and the Chinese Special Forces.

He appeared in several films, including Shaolin Temple (1982, Jet Li's first starring film), and a role as himself in Iron & Silk (1990) and Talons of the Eagle (1992).

Grand Master Pan died on 29 June 2017 in Kitchener, Ontario, Canada.
