= Martin Jezer =

American writer and activist (1940–2005)

Marty Jezer (November 21, 1940 – June 11, 2005) was an activist and author. Born Martin Jezer and raised in the Bronx, he earned a history degree from Lafayette College. He was a co-founding member of the Working Group on Electoral Democracy, and co-authored influential model legislation on campaign finance reform that has so far been adopted by Maine and Arizona. He was involved in state and local politics, as a campaign worker for Bernie Sanders, Vermont's Independent Congressional Representative, and as a columnist and Town Representative.

== Writer and activist ==
Jezer had been an influential figure in progressive politics from the 1960s to the time of his death. He was editor of WIN magazine (Workshop In Nonviolence), from 1962-8, was a writer for Liberation News Service (LNS), and was active in the nuclear freeze movement, and the organic farming movement (he helped found the Natural Organic Farmers' Association). In 1968, he signed the "Writers and Editors War Tax Protest" pledge, vowing to refuse tax payments in protest against the Vietnam War. More recently he was active in progressive causes in Vermont, including the universal health care movement. In 1968 Jezer co-founded, with Verandah Porche, Richard Wizansky, and Ray Mungo, "Total Loss (Packer Corners) Farm" in Guilford, Vermont. After moving to Guilford, he continued writing for WIN magazine, as well as Green Mountain Post, and the NOFA newsletter. His main political outlet from 1998 to 2005 was as a writer of a weekly column for the Brattleboro Reformer that often appeared on the web sites Common Dreams and TomPaine.com; his columns were frequently reprinted in the periodical The Progressive Populist.

Jezer stuttered from childhood and wrote a memoir about his condition. He was an important figure in the self-help community for people who stutter, and received the "Member of the Year" award from the National Stuttering Association in 2001. He was also an active member of Speak Easy, based in New Jersey.

== Books by Marty Jezer ==
- The Dark Ages: Life in the United States 1945-1960 (South End Press, 1982). ISBN 0-89608-128-1
- Rachel Carson: Biologist and Author (Chelsea House Publications, 1988). ISBN 1-55546-646-X
- Abbie Hoffman: American Rebel (1992; Rutgers University Press, 1993). ISBN 0-8135-2017-7
- Stuttering: A Life Bound Up In Words (1997; Small Pond Press, 2003). ISBN 0-9725345-0-4 (website with six downloadable chapter excerpts plus an article about stuttering, authorized by Jezer)
- Opening of the Western Frontier (Bluewood Books, 2000), in The Making of America series. ISBN 0-912517-45-X
- The Civil War (Bluewood Books, 2001), in The Making of America series. ISBN 0-912517-50-6
