= Abbie Hoffman =

American activist (1936–1989)

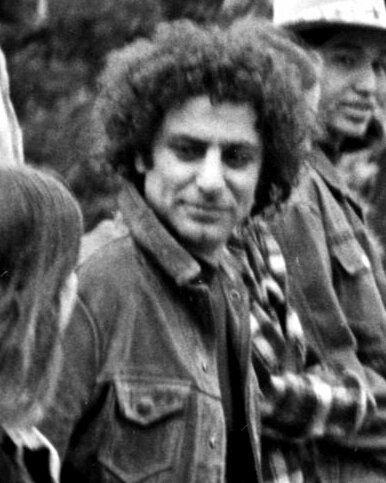
- Hoffman in 1969
- Born: Abbot Howard Hoffman; November 30, 1936; Worcester, Massachusetts, U.S.
- Died: April 12, 1989 (aged 52); Solebury Township, Pennsylvania, U.S.
- Other names: FREE!; Barry Freed
- Education: Worcester Academy; Brandeis University (BA); University of California, Berkeley (MA)
- Occupations: Writer; psychologist; speaker; activist
- Years active: 1966–1989
- Known for: Political philosophy, social revolution, guerrilla theater, civil rights movement, gift economics
- Notable work: Revolution for the Hell of It; Woodstock Nation; Steal This Book
- Movement: Yippie, 1960s counterculture
- Spouses: Sheila Karklin (m. 1960; div. 1966); Anita Kushner (m. 1967; div. 1980)
- Children: 3

Abbot Howard Hoffman (November 30, 1936 – April 12, 1989) was an American political and social activist who co-founded the Youth International Party ("Yippies") and was a member of the Chicago Seven. He was also a leading proponent of the Flower Power movement.

As a member of the Chicago Seven, Hoffman was charged with and tried for activities during the 1968 Democratic National Convention, for conspiring to use interstate commerce with intent to incite a riot and crossing state lines with the intent to incite a riot under the anti-riot provisions of Title X of the Civil Rights Act of 1968. Five of the Chicago Seven defendants, including Hoffman, were convicted of crossing state lines with intent to incite a riot; all of the convictions were vacated after an appeal and the U.S. Department of Justice declined to pursue another trial. Hoffman, along with all of the defendants and their attorneys, also was convicted and sentenced for contempt of court by the judge; these convictions also were vacated after an appeal.

Hoffman continued his activism into the 1970s, and following a 1973 anti-drug sting he became a fugitive and changed his name until 1980, when he turned himself in. He is an icon of the anti-Vietnam war movement and the counterculture of the 1960s. He died by suicide with a phenobarbital overdose in 1989 at age 52.

== Early life and education ==
Abbot Howard Hoffman was born November 30, 1936, in Worcester, Massachusetts, to Florence (née Schanberg) and John Hoffman. Hoffman was raised in a middle-class Jewish household and had two younger siblings. Hoffman's mother, Florence Schanberg, was born in Clinton, Massachusetts, to Orthodox Jewish immigrants from Austria. His father, John Hoffman, was born in Russia shortly after the failed 1905 revolution but rarely discussed his origins due to the anti-communist climate of the time. Hoffman only began to uncover his paternal family history while writing his autobiography in the 1970s.

According to family accounts, the Hoffmans originally bore the surname Shapoznikoff and were lower-middle-class Jewish shopkeepers in Russia. Seeking to escape czarist repression, a relative named Jacob Shapoznikoff allegedly obtained or assumed the identity of a German named Hoffman to emigrate to the United States. He traveled via Siberia and Japan to California, eventually settling in New York, where he facilitated the immigration of other family members. Hoffman's paternal grandparents, Morris and Anna Shapoznikoff, immigrated to the U.S. around 1910.

During his school days, he became known as a troublemaker who started fights, played pranks, vandalized school property, and referred to teachers by their first names. In his second year, Hoffman was expelled from Classical High School, a now-closed public high school in Worcester. As an atheist, Hoffman wrote a paper declaring that, "God could not possibly exist, for if he did, there wouldn't be any suffering in the world." The irate teacher ripped up the paper and called him "a Communist punk." Hoffman jumped on the teacher and started fighting him until he was restrained and removed from the school. On June 3, 1954, 17-year-old Hoffman was arrested for the first time, for driving without a license. After his expulsion, he attended Worcester Academy, graduating in 1955. Hoffman engaged in many behaviors typical of rebellious teenagers in the 1950s, such as riding motorcycles, wearing leather jackets, and sporting a ducktail haircut.

Upon graduating, he enrolled at nearby Brandeis University, where he studied under professors such as noted psychologist Abraham Maslow, often considered the father of humanistic psychology. He was also a student of Marxist theorist Herbert Marcuse, who Hoffman said had a profound effect on his political outlook. Hoffman would later cite Marcuse's influence during his activism and his theories on revolution. He was on the Brandeis tennis team, which was coached by journalist Bud Collins. Hoffman graduated with a B.A. in psychology in 1959. That fall, he enrolled at the University of California, Berkeley, where he completed coursework toward a master's degree in psychology. Soon after, he married his girlfriend Sheila Karklin in May 1960.

== Countercultural activism ==
=== Early activity ===
Before his days as a leading member of the Yippie movement, Hoffman was involved with the Student Nonviolent Coordinating Committee (SNCC), and organized Liberty House, which sold items to support the civil rights movement in the southern United States. During the Vietnam War, Hoffman was an anti-war activist, using deliberately comical and theatrical tactics.

In late 1966, Hoffman met with a radical community-action group called the Diggers and studied their ideology. He later returned to New York and published a book with this knowledge. Doing so was considered a violation by the Diggers. Diggers co-founder Peter Coyote explained:

Abbie, who was a friend of mine, was always a media junky. We explained everything to those guys, and they violated everything we taught them. Abbie went back, and the first thing he did was publish a book, with his picture on it, that blew the hustle of every poor person on the Lower East Side by describing every free scam then current in New York, which were then sucked dry by disaffected kids from Scarsdale.

One of Hoffman's well-known stunts was on August 24, 1967, when he led members of the movement to the gallery of the New York Stock Exchange (NYSE). The protesters threw fistfuls of real and fake dollar bills down to the traders below, some of whom booed, while others began to scramble frantically to grab the money as fast as they could. Accounts of the amount of money that Hoffman and the group tossed was said to be as little as $30 to $300. Hoffman claimed to be pointing out that, metaphorically, that's what NYSE traders "were already doing." "We didn't call the press," wrote Hoffman, "At that time we really had no notion of anything called a media event." Yet the press was quick to react and by evening the event was reported around the world. After that incident, the stock exchange spent $20,000 (approximately equivalent to $193,000 in 2025) to enclose the gallery with bulletproof glass.

In October 1967, David Dellinger of the National Mobilization Committee to End the War in Vietnam asked Jerry Rubin to help mobilize and direct a march on the Pentagon. The protesters gathered at the Lincoln Memorial as Dellinger and Dr. Benjamin Spock gave speeches to the mass of people. From there, the group marched towards the Pentagon. As the protesters neared the Pentagon, they were met by soldiers of the 82nd Airborne Division who formed a human barricade blocking the Pentagon steps. Not to be dissuaded, Hoffman vowed to levitate the Pentagon claiming he would attempt to use psychic energy to levitate the Pentagon until it would turn orange and begin to vibrate, at which time the war in Vietnam would end. Allen Ginsberg led Tibetan chants to assist Hoffman, and also present was writer and filmmaker Norman Mailer.

=== Chicago Seven conspiracy trial ===
Hoffman was a member of a group of defendants that became known as the Chicago Seven (originally known as the Chicago Eight), which included fellow Yippies Jerry Rubin, David Dellinger, Rennie Davis, John Froines, Lee Weiner, Tom Hayden, and Bobby Seale (before his trial was severed from the others), who were charged by the United States federal government with conspiracy, crossing state lines with intent to incite a riot, and other charges related to anti-Vietnam War and countercultural protests in Chicago, Illinois during the 1968 Democratic National Convention.

Presided over by Judge Julius Hoffman (no relation to Hoffman, about which he joked throughout the trial), Abbie Hoffman's courtroom antics frequently grabbed the headlines; one day, defendants Hoffman and Rubin appeared in court dressed in judicial robes, while on another day, Hoffman was sworn in as a witness with his hand giving the finger. Judge Hoffman became the favorite courtroom target of the Chicago Seven defendants, who frequently would insult the judge to his face. Abbie Hoffman told Judge Hoffman "you are a shande fur de goyim [disgrace in front of the gentiles]. You would have served Hitler better." He later added that "your idea of justice is the only obscenity in the room." Both Davis and Rubin told the judge, "This court is bullshit." When Hoffman was asked in what state he resided, he replied the "state of mind of my brothers and sisters."

Other celebrities were called as "cultural witnesses" including Allen Ginsberg, Phil Ochs, Arlo Guthrie, Judy Collins, Norman Mailer and others. Hoffman closed the trial with a speech in which he quoted Abraham Lincoln, making the claim that the president himself, were he alive today, would also have been arrested in Chicago's Lincoln Park.

On February 18, 1970, Hoffman and four of the other defendants (Rubin, Dellinger, Davis, and Hayden) were found guilty of intent to incite a riot while crossing state lines. All seven defendants were found not guilty of conspiracy. At sentencing, Hoffman suggested the judge try LSD and offered to set him up with "a dealer he knew in Florida." (The judge was known to be headed to Florida for a post-trial vacation.) Each of the five was sentenced to five years in prison and given a $5,000 fine (equivalent to $41,000 in 2025).

However, all convictions were subsequently overturned by the Seventh Circuit Court of Appeals.

=== Continuing protests ===
At Woodstock in 1969, Hoffman interrupted the Who's performance to attempt to speak against the jailing of John Sinclair of the White Panther Party. He grabbed a microphone and yelled, "I think this is a pile of shit, while John Sinclair rots in prison...". Pete Townshend was adjusting his amplifier between songs and turned to look at Hoffman over his left shoulder. Townshend shouted "Fuck off! Fuck off my fucking stage!" and reportedly ran at Hoffman with his guitar and hit Hoffman in the back, although Townshend later denied attacking Hoffman. Townshend later said that while he actually agreed with Hoffman on Sinclair's imprisonment, he would have knocked him offstage regardless of the content of his message, given that Hoffman had violated the "sanctity of the stage," i.e., the right of the band to perform uninterrupted by distractions not relevant to the show. The incident took place during a camera change and was not captured on film. The audio of this incident, however, can be heard on The Who's box set Thirty Years of Maximum R&B (Disc 2, Track 20, "Abbie Hoffman Incident").

In Woodstock Nation, Hoffman mentions the incident and says he was on a bad LSD trip at the time. Joe Shea, then a reporter for the Times Herald-Record, a local newspaper that covered the event on-site, said he saw the incident. He recalled that Hoffman was actually hit in the back of the head by Townshend's guitar and toppled directly into the pit in front of the stage. He does not recall any "shove" from Townshend, and discounts both men's accounts.

In 1971, Hoffman published Steal This Book, which advised readers on how to live for free. (Many readers followed his advice and stole the book, leading many bookstores to refuse to carry it.) The book contained a section called "Free Communication," in which Hoffman encourages his readership to take to the stage at rock concerts to use the pre-assembled audience and PA system to get their message out. However, he mentions that "interrupting the concert is frowned upon since it is only spitting in the faces of people you are trying to reach."

Hoffman was also the author of several other books, including Vote! co-written with Rubin and Ed Sanders.

== Later life ==
=== Arrest and flight ===
Hoffman was arrested on August 28, 1973, for intent to sell and distribute cocaine. He always maintained that undercover police agents entrapped him into a drug deal and planted suitcases of cocaine in his office. In the spring of 1974, Hoffman skipped bail, underwent cosmetic surgery to alter his appearance, and hid from authorities for several years.

Some believed that Hoffman made himself a target. In 1998, Peter Coyote stated:

The FBI couldn't infiltrate us. We did everything anonymously, and we did everything for nothing because we wanted our actions to be authentic. It's the mistake that Abbie Hoffman made. He came out, he studied with us, we taught him everything, and then he went back and wrote a book called Free, and he put his name on it! He set himself up to be a leader of the counterculture, and he was undone by that. Big mistake.

Hoffman lived under the name Barry Freed in Fineview, New York, near Thousand Island Park, a private resort on the St. Lawrence River. He helped coordinate an environmental campaign to preserve the St. Lawrence River. Hoffman also was the travel columnist for Crawdaddy! magazine. On September 4, 1980, he surrendered to authorities, and he appeared the same day on a pre-taped edition of ABC's 20/20 in an interview with Barbara Walters. Hoffman received a one-year sentence but was released after four months.

=== Return to activism ===
In November 1986, Hoffman was arrested along with 14 others, including Amy Carter, the daughter of former President Jimmy Carter, for trespassing at the University of Massachusetts Amherst. The charges stemmed from a protest against the Central Intelligence Agency's recruitment on the UMass campus. Since the university's policy limited campus recruitment to law-abiding organizations, the defense argued that the CIA engaged in illegal activities. The federal district court judge permitted expert witnesses, including former Attorney General Ramsey Clark and a former CIA agent who testified that the CIA carried on an illegal Contra war against the Sandinista government in Nicaragua in violation of the Boland Amendment.

In three days of testimony, more than a dozen defense witnesses, including Daniel Ellsberg, and former Contra leader Édgar Chamorro, described the CIA's role in more than two decades of covert, illegal, and often violent activities. In his closing argument, Hoffman, acting as his own attorney, placed his actions within the best tradition of American civil disobedience. He quoted from Thomas Paine, "the most outspoken and farsighted of the leaders of the American Revolution: 'Every age and generation must be as free to act for itself, in all cases, as the ages and generations which preceded it. Man has no property in man, neither has any generation a property in the generations which are to follow.'"

Hoffman concluded: "Thomas Paine was talking about this Spring day in this courtroom. A verdict of not guilty will say, 'When our country is right, keep it right; but when it is wrong, right those wrongs.'" On April 15, 1987, the jury found Hoffman and the other defendants not guilty.

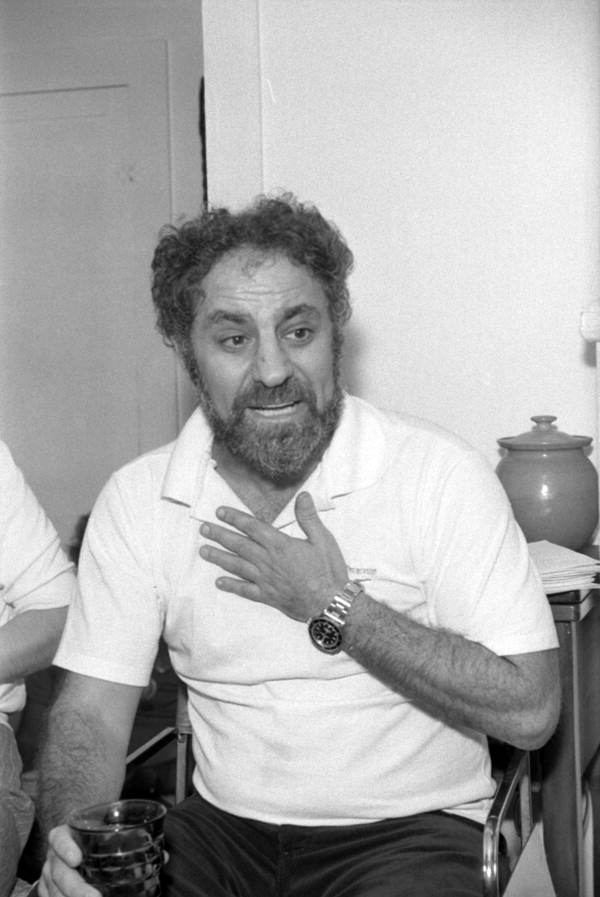
Hoffman in Tallahassee, Florida, 1989

After his acquittal, Hoffman acted in a cameo appearance in Oliver Stone's later-released anti-Vietnam War film, Born on the Fourth of July (1989). He essentially played himself in the movie, waving a flag on the ramparts of an administration building during a campus protest that was being teargassed and crushed by state troopers.

Despite his return to activism, Hoffman also grew frustrated with the growing unwillingness of the younger generation to engage in protests.

In 1987 Hoffman summed up his views:

You are talking to a leftist. I believe in the redistribution of wealth and power in the world. I believe in universal hospital care for everyone. I believe that we should not have a single homeless person in the richest country in the world. And I believe that we should not have a CIA that goes around overwhelming governments and assassinating political leaders, working for tight oligarchies around the world to protect the tight oligarchy here at home.

Later that same year, Hoffman and Jonathan Silvers wrote Steal This Urine Test (published October 5, 1987), which exposed the internal contradictions of the war on drugs and suggested ways to circumvent its most intrusive measures. Although Hoffman's satiric humor was on display throughout the book, Publishers Weekly wrote that "the extensive, in-depth research and a barrage of facts and figures ... make this the definitive guide to the current drug-testing environment."

Stone's Born on the Fourth of July was released on December 20, 1989, just eight months after Hoffman's suicide on April 12, 1989. At the time of his death, Hoffman was at the height of a renewed public visibility, one of the few 1960s radicals who still commanded the attention of the media. He regularly lectured about the CIA's covert activities, including assassinations disguised as suicides. His Playboy article (October 1988), outlining the connections that constitute the "October Surprise", brought that alleged conspiracy to the attention of a wide-ranging American readership for the first time.

== Personal life ==
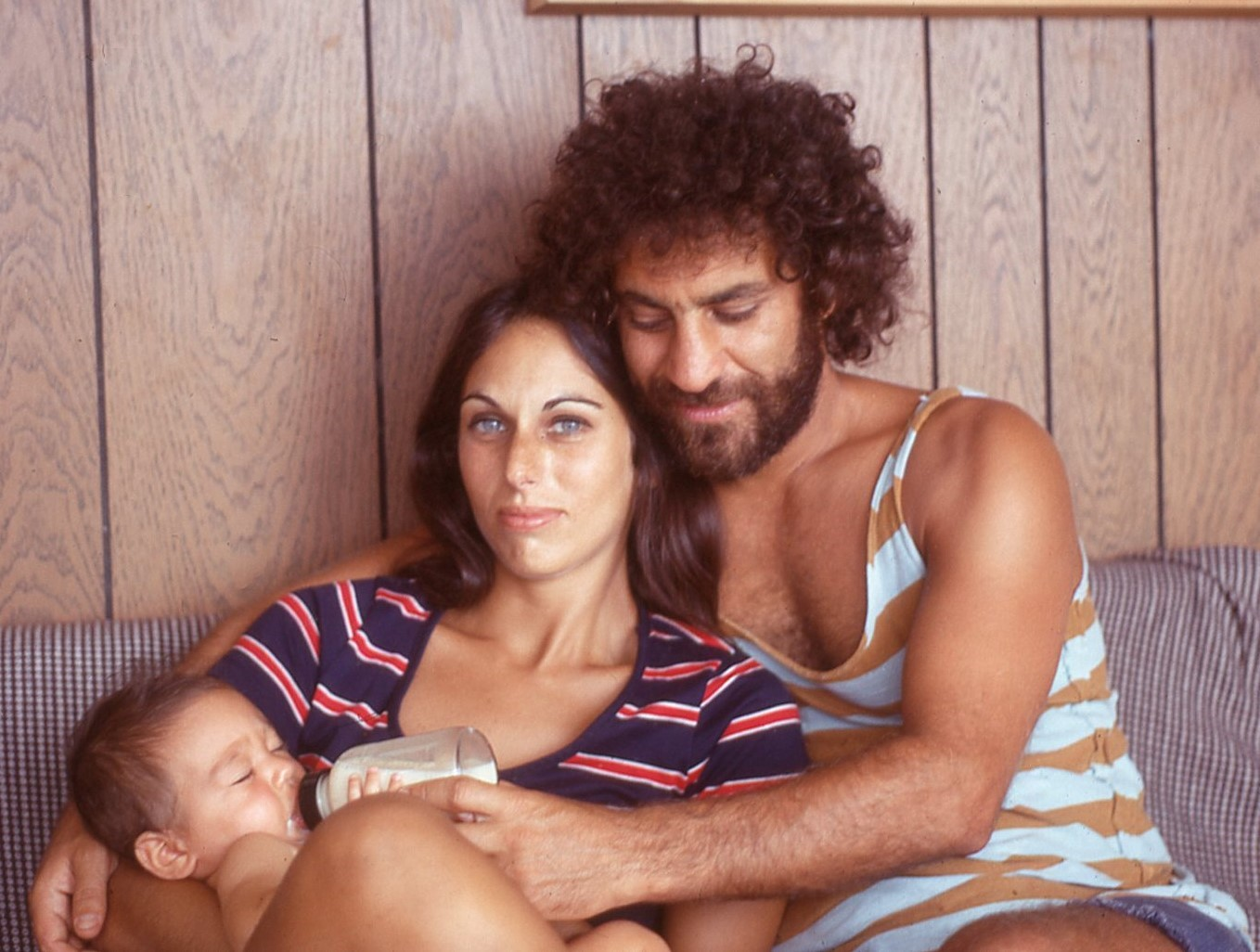
Hoffman (right) with wife, Anita, and son in 1972

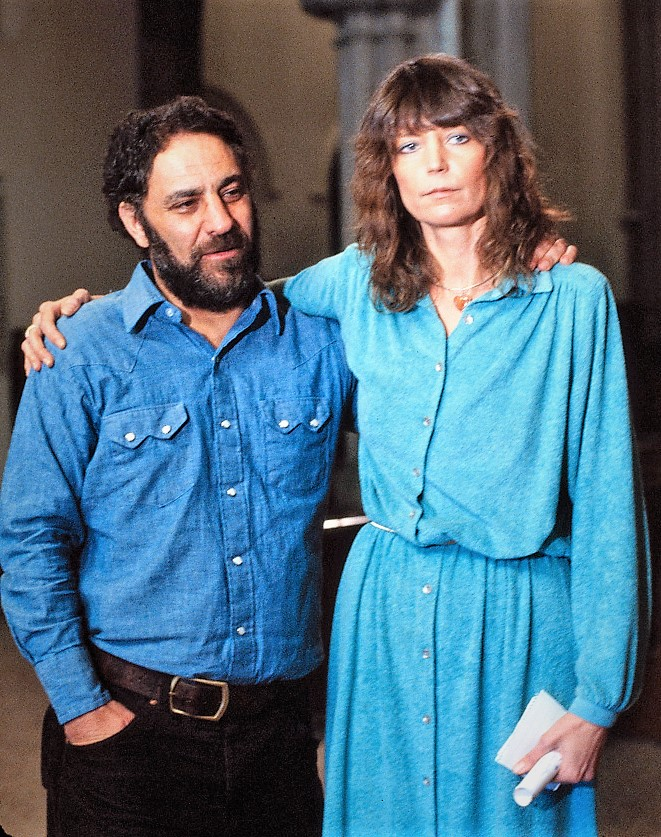
Hoffman and Johanna Lawrenson in 1981

In 1960, Hoffman married Sheila Karklin (1938–2021), and had two children, including Andrew. Hoffman and Karklin divorced in 1966. In 1967, he married Anita Kushner (1942–1998) in Manhattan's Central Park. They had one son, America. Hoffman and Kushner effectively were separated when Hoffman became a fugitive in 1973, although they were not formally divorced until 1980. While underground, Hoffman's companion was Johanna Lawrenson.

His personal life drew a great deal of scrutiny from the Federal Bureau of Investigation (FBI), whose file on him was 13,262 pages long.

== Death ==
Hoffman was found dead in his apartment in Solebury Township, Pennsylvania, on April 12, 1989, age 52. The cause of death was suicide by overdose from 150 phenobarbital tablets and liquor. Two hundred pages of handwritten notes were nearby, many detailing his moods. He had been diagnosed with bipolar disorder in 1980. He had recently changed treatment medications and was reportedly depressed when his 83-year-old mother was diagnosed with cancer (she died in 1996 at age 90). Some who were close to him claimed that he was also unhappy about reaching middle age, combined with the fact that the radical upheaval and rebelliousness of the 1960s and 1970s had been followed by a conservative backlash in the 1980s. In 1984, he had expressed dismay that the current generation of young people were not as interested in protesting and social activism as the youth had been during the 1960s.

His death was officially ruled a suicide. Hoffman's fellow Chicago Seven defendant David Dellinger disputed this; he said, "I don't believe for one moment the suicide thing" and said that Hoffman had "numerous plans for the future." However, the coroner stood by the ruling, saying, "There is no way to take that amount of phenobarbital without intent. It was intentional and self-inflicted."

His memorial service was held a week later in Worcester, Massachusetts, at Temple Emanuel, the synagogue that he attended as a child, with 1,000 friends and family members in attendance.

== Works ==
=== Books ===
- Fuck the System (pamphlet, 1967) printed under the pseudonym George Metesky
- Revolution for the Hell of It (1968, Dial Press) published under the pseudonym "Free"
  - Revolution for the Hell of It: The Book That Earned Abbie Hoffman a 5 Year Prison Term at the Chicago Conspiracy Trial. Including Abbie Hoffman's Special Introduction to this edition "Chicago: Two Years After" (1970 reprint, Pocket Books, SBN 671-78032-8)
  - Revolution for the Hell of It: The Book That Earned Abbie Hoffman a 5 Year Prison Term at the Chicago Conspiracy Trial (2005 reprint, ISBN 1-56025-690-7)
- Woodstock Nation: A Talk-Rock Album (1969, Random House)
- Steal This Book (1971, Pirate Editions)
  - Steal This Book (1996 reprint, ISBN 1-56858-217-X)
  - Archive.org copy
- Vote! A Record, A Dialogue, A Manifesto – Miami Beach, 1972 and Beyond (1972, Warner Books) by Hoffman, Jerry Rubin, and Ed Sanders
- To America with Love: Letters from the Underground (1976, Stonehill Publishing) by Hoffman and Anita Hoffman
  - To America with Love: Letters from the Underground (2000 second edition, ISBN 1-888996-28-5)
- Soon to Be a Major Motion Picture (1980, Perigee, ISBN 0-399-50503-2)
  - The Autobiography of Abbie Hoffman (2000 second edition, ISBN 1-56858-197-1)
- Square Dancing in the Ice Age: Underground Writings (1982, Putnam, ISBN 0-399-12701-1)
- Steal This Urine Test: Fighting Drug Hysteria in America (1987, Penguin, ISBN 0-14-010400-3) by Hoffman and Jonathan Silvers
- The Best of Abbie Hoffman (1990, Four Walls Eight Windows, ISBN 0-941423-42-5)
- Preserving Disorder: The Faking of the President 1988 (1999, Viking, ISBN 0-670-82349-X) by Hoffman and Jonathan Silvers

=== Record ===
- Abbie Hoffman and the Joint Chiefs of Staff. Wake Up, America! Big Toe Records (1971)

== Media ==
=== Interviews ===
- Ken Jordan interview from January 1989, published in Reality Sandwich, May 2007

=== Appearances in documentary films ===
Hoffman is featured in interviews and archival news footage in the following documentaries:

- Last Summer Won't Happen (1968), film by Peter Gessner & Tom Hurwitz; "a sympathetic but not uncritical document of the East Village in New York during that year (1968), capturing the movement's internal conflicts and contradictions".
- Hoffman's speech during the 1968 Democratic National Convention is featured in the 1969 Canadian fiction/documentary hybrid film, Prologue.
- Breathing Together: Revolution of the Electric Family (1971)
- Lord of the Universe (1974), satirical documentary, winner of the DuPont-Columbia Award in broadcast journalism, ISBN 0-89774-102-1
- It Was 20 Years Ago Today (1987) Documentary about the year in which the Beatles' Sgt. Pepper's Lonely Hearts Club Band was released.
- Growing Up in America (1988), documentary on radical politics in the 1960s, First Run Features
- My Dinner with Abbie (1990).
- My Name Is Abbie (1998), Hoffman's first interview after seven years in hiding, Mystic Fire Video, ISBN 1-56176-381-0
- Phil Ochs: There but for Fortune (2010), biographical documentary on the life and times of the singer-songwriter, First Run Features

=== Appearances in feature films ===
- Born on the Fourth of July (1989); Hoffman appears as an organizer of the Syracuse University student strike which was triggered by the Kent State shooting. He died before the film was released, and a dedication to him is included in the credits.

=== Appearances on television ===
- The Merv Griffin Show, March 27, 1970. Merv's guests were Abbie Hoffman, Daria Halprin, Mark Frechette, Virginia Graham, and Tony Dolan. CBS blurred the video of Hoffman so viewers at home would not see his American flag pattern shirt, even though other guests had worn the same shirt in the past, uncensored, and Pat Boone appeared in an automobile commercial on that very broadcast wearing a similar flag-motif shirt.
- Vanguard Press's 10th Anniversary Media Bash, February 17, 1988, Moderated by Peter Freyne. With Abbie Hoffman, Dave Dellinger, and Bernie Sanders.
- The Coca Crystal Show: If I Can't Dance, You Can Keep Your Revolution, Manhattan Cable Television (Channel J), Public Access Cable TV, New York City.

=== Appearances on radio ===
- Abbie Hoffman on WMCA radio, 1971
- Abbie Hoffman on WBAI radio

- August 27, 1968 telephone recording of speeches during the Chicago DNC protests broadcast by Bob Fass

- Abbie Hoffman – 1988 – Howard Stern Show

== In popular culture ==
- Hoffman is portrayed by Sacha Baron Cohen in The Trial of the Chicago 7 (2020). Baron Cohen was nominated for Best Supporting Actor in the 93rd Academy Awards.
- Michael Lembeck portrayed Hoffman in the 1987 HBO television film Conspiracy: The Trial of the Chicago 8.
- Hoffman was portrayed by Richard D'Alessandro in the 1994 film Forrest Gump, speaking against "the war in Viet-fucking-nam" at a protest rally at the Lincoln Memorial Reflecting Pool facing the Washington Monument.
- Hoffman's life was dramatized in the 2000 film Steal This Movie!, in which he was portrayed by Vincent D'Onofrio.
- Hank Azaria's voice is heard as the animated Hoffman in the film Chicago 10 (2007).
- Thomas Ian Nicholas portrays Hoffman in the 2010 film titled The Chicago 8.
- Bern Cohen played the lead role in the 2011 Off Broadway play Abbie.
- Hoffman is mentioned in the song "Stuck in the 90's" on the 1993 album Bargainville by Canadian vocal group Moxy Früvous.
- A doll in Hoffman's likeness is used in a Raggedy Ann parody in the animated series Histeria!.
- In season 4 of Wings (episode 13 "Labor Pains"), Faye describes an encounter with Hoffman at a protest in 1966.
- Hoffman is mentioned by Officer Bookman in the 1991 Seinfeld episode "The Library".
- The 1992 song "Scum Lives On" by Jerusalem Slim, a band featuring former Hanoi Rocks members Michael Monroe and Sami Yaffa, and Billy Idol guitarist Steve Stevens, includes the line "Was Abbie Hoffman really suicide?" The song was later re-recorded by Monroe and Yaffa's band Demolition 23 for their 1994 self-titled album.

== See also ==
- List of peace activists
- 1980 October Surprise theory
