= Judy Gumbo =

Canadian-American activist (1943–2026)

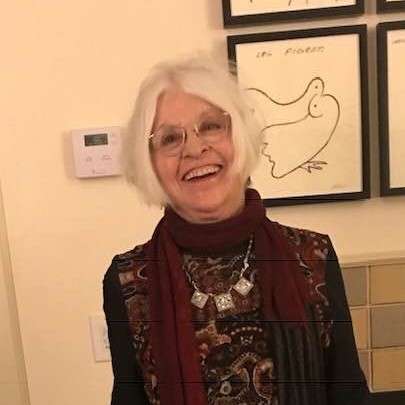
- Gumbo in 2019
- Born: Judith Lee Clavir; June 25, 1943; Toronto, Ontario, Canada
- Died: September 14, 2026 (aged 83); Berkeley, California, U.S.
- Occupation: Activist
- Spouse(s): David Hemblen (m. 1966; div. 1968) Stew Albert (m. 1977; died 2006) David Dobkin (m. 2008; died 2014) Arthur Eckstein (m. 2017)
- Children: 1

Judith Lee Clavir (June 25, 1943 – September 14, 2026), known as Judy Gumbo, was a Canadian-American activist. She was an original member of the Yippies, the Youth International Party, a 1960s counter culture and satirical anti-war group, alongside Anita and Abbie Hoffman, Nancy Kurshan and Jerry Rubin, and her husband Stew Albert.

== Early life and education ==
Gumbo was born Judith Lee Clavir in Toronto on June 25, 1943. Of her family, she said: "We were both Jewish and 'godless' Communists as the far right likes to claim. Instead of synagogue, our rituals took place in front of bookshelves, my atheistic family's holy of holies." She received a bachelor's degree in sociology from the University of Toronto, where she also attended graduate school.

== Activism ==
Gumbo moved to Berkeley in the fall of 1967 and became involved with the activist community. She worked at the 1960s underground newspaper the Berkeley Barb, and helped found its offshoot Berkeley Tribe.

In 1968, after joining the Yippies, she campaigned for a presidential nomination for the pig Pigasus during the protests at the Democratic National Convention in Chicago. She advocated for women's rights, in part through W.I.T.C.H. (Women's International Terrorist Conspiracy from Hell), a Yippie guerrilla theater feminist group.

In 1970, during the Vietnam War, Gumbo and two other Yippie women visited the former North Vietnam.

In 1972, the FBI described Gumbo as "the most vicious, the most anti-American, the most anti-establishment, and the most dangerous to the internal security of the United States". In 1975, she discovered that a tracking device had been placed on her car. Her home was broken into and a listening device was installed. It was active for 8 days. She later took part in a lawsuit that successfully challenged warrantless wiretapping.

Gumbo and fellow activist Stew Albert were married in 1977. She was given her nickname, Gumbo, by Black Panther Party leader Eldridge Cleaver.

In 2013, Gumbo returned to unified Vietnam to take part in a celebration of the 40th anniversary of the Paris Peace Accords. Her memoir, Yippie Girl: Exploits in Protest and Defeating the FBI, was published in May 2022.

== Personal life and death ==
Gumbo was married to Albert from 1977 until his death in 2006. She was married to actor David Hemblen from 1966–1968, and David Dobkin, a co-founder of Berkeley Co-Housing, from 2008 until his death in 2014. She married historian Arthur Eckstein in 2017. She and Albert had a daughter.

Gumbo died from complications of dementia in Berkeley, California, on September 14, 2026, at the age of 83.

== Bibliography ==
- Gumbo, Judy; Yippie Girl: Exploits in Protest and Defeating the FBI;Three Rooms Press; May 2022; pp. 342 ISBN 978-1953103185
