= Steve Conliff =

American activist, writer and historian

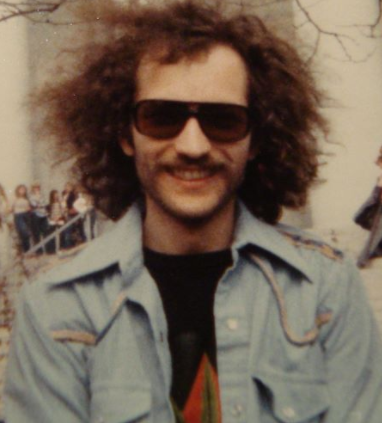
- Steve Conliff at the Ohio Statehouse during his campaign for Governor of Ohio, 1978
- Born: Steven Edwin Conliff; November 24, 1949; Milwaukee, Wisconsin, United States
- Died: June 1, 2006 (aged 56); Columbus, OH
- Education: Miami University, Ohio State University
- Occupations: writer, publisher, political organizer, social satirist
- Spouse: Suzan Bird Conliff
- Children: 3
- Writing career
- Pen name: Leon Yipsky, Zorba the Freak
- Language: English
- Period: 60s and 70s
- Subjects: Yippies, politics, American Left, mass movements, Native American history
- Notable works: Blacklisted News: Secret Histories from Chicago, '68, to 1984

Steven Conliff (November 24, 1949 – June 1, 2006) was a Midwestern-based Native American writer, historian, social satirist, alternative-media publisher and political activist in the 1960s and 1970s.

Conliff is chiefly remembered for throwing a banana cream pie at James A. Rhodes, the governor of Ohio, in 1977, at the opening of the Ohio State Fair in Columbus, Ohio.

== Biography ==
Steve Conliff attended Miami University of Ohio, where he worked extensively with the National Mobilization Committee to End the War in Vietnam, known as "the mobe". It was during his time with the mobe that he began to question the effectiveness of "politics as usual" and at about the same time, met up with the Youth International Party (Yippies). It was as a newly-converted Yippie that Conliff moved to Columbus, Ohio, in 1970, briefly attending Ohio State University. Most of his activities revolved around politics and political organizing; he was a gifted and tireless organizer. One of his first experiences passing out anti-war leaflets at a local campus burger-joint got him arrested for vagrancy; he immediately challenged the constitutionality of the vagrancy laws as discriminatory against youth and poor people.

In the summer of 1970, Steve Conliff started his first Yippie publication, Purple Berries—which later morphed into the publication Sour Grapes. Conliff was also one of the founders of the Columbus Free Press (to which he contributed up until his passing) and the public-education-critical Subversive Scholastic (1978–84). He regularly wrote for YIPster Times (1972–78), HVPTA / Bite Magazine (1978-80), and Overthrow (1979–98). In addition, Conliff's work also appeared in High Times, News From Indian Country, Akwesasne Notes, Open Road, Take Over, Fifth Estate, In These Times and The Mohican News—among numerous other zines and underground newspapers, frequently writing under the pseudonym "Leon Yipsky." He helped launch countless other publications, and published the local magazine Columbus Entertainment (which focused on cultural diversity before it was fashionable) from 1986 to 1988. (Note: Not to be confused with the current magazine of the same name, which is its own entity.) A tribal descendant, Conliff presented papers detailing Mohican Indian history on the Stockbridge-Munsee Reservation (2001) at the New York State Museum in Albany (2004). He also contributed American Indian ethnography to Notable Native Americans (Gale 1995) and Volume 1 of the Gale Encyclopedia of Native American Tribes (Gale 1998).

Steve Conliff was an important leader of the Yippies' second wave, which included well-known activists such as Tom Forcade, Ben Masel, A.J. Weberman, Aron Kay (another famous pie thrower), David Peel, and Dana Beal. He was also the transatlantic coordinator of the Rock Against Racism USA campaign of 1979, helping to organize concerts in Columbus, Dayton, Madison, Detroit, Chicago, and New York City.

== The Pie and the Gubernatorial Campaign ==
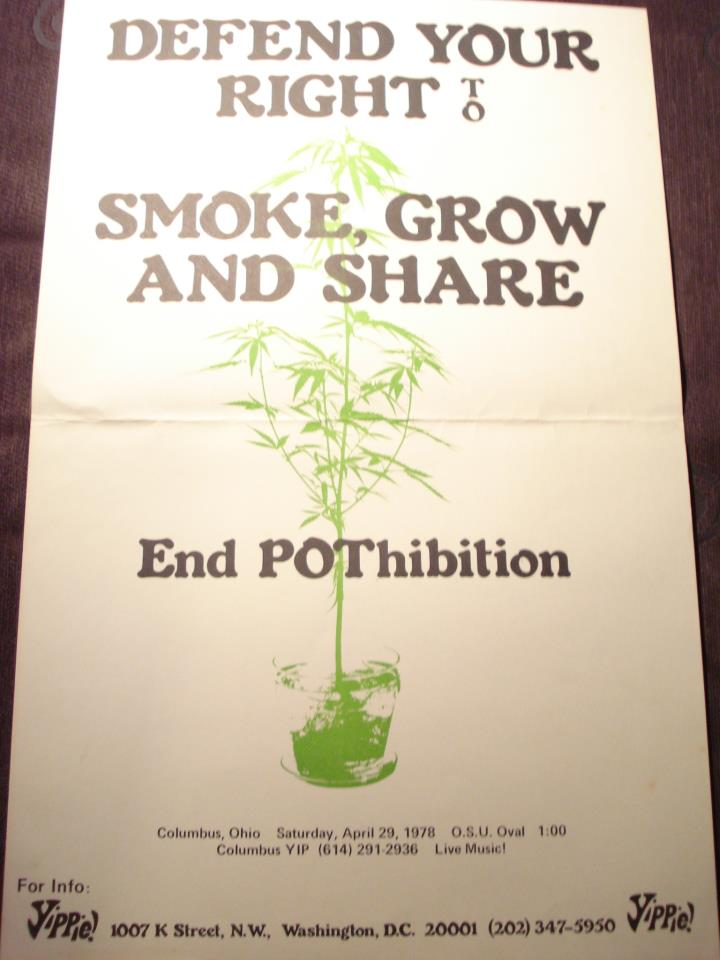
Poster advertising Yippie-sponsored Smoke-In at Ohio State University, April 29, 1978. This event also served as an unofficial "Conliff for Governor" rally.

Steve Conliff's decision to throw a pie at Governor Rhodes was due to Rhodes' direct role in the Kent State shootings; particularly 1) the ordering of Ohio National Guard troops onto campus, and 2) his angry speech given the day before the shootings (May 3, 1970) to assembled news media. Rhodes' infamous speech was said to inflame conservatives as well as the guardsmen occupying campus, thereby lighting the fuse of an already-incendiary situation:

We have seen here at the City of Kent especially, probably the most vicious form of campus-oriented violence yet perpetrated by dissident groups and their allies in the State of Ohio ... these people just move from one campus to the other and terrorize a community. They're worse than the Brown Shirts and the communist element and also the Night Riders and the vigilantes. They're the worst type of people that we harbor in America. And I want to say that they're not going to take over the campus. And the campus now is going to be part of the County and the State of Ohio.

In 1977, the Kent State University Administration decided to build a gymnasium on the exact site of the Kent State shootings, where there was already a small but respectful memorial to the four slain students erected by B'nai B'rith. This provoked a series of protests: there were numerous demonstrations and an infamous "Tent City" erected on the site that eventually had to be bulldozed down, its 193 inhabitants forcibly removed and arrested. It was in this carnival atmosphere that the pieing of Governor James Rhodes took place. After pieing Rhodes and the generally-positive reaction, Conliff decided to run for governor against Rhodes, as a Republican. This campaign was not treated very seriously by Ohio media, but gave Conliff access to various conservative venues in which he delivered anti-war, anti-capitalist and pro-marijuana speeches to decidedly-unfriendly audiences with aplomb, which he seemed to enjoy:

Yippie Conliff says he's too young to serve as governor even if elected, but sees no problem with the state not having a governor.

When his Lieutenant Governor candidate, yippie Leatrice Urbanowicz, was thrown off the GOP ballot for being a registered Democrat, that was also an occasion for more Yippie hoopla.

== Zorba the Freak ==
One of Conliff's continuing characters throughout his work was an alter ego, "the Leader of the Street People", named Zorba the Freak. Zorba liked to dish about other Yippies (who often recognized themselves in his stories) and became locally legendary, as well as an inside joke among the Yippies. According to Columbus poet-activist Steve Abbott:

In journalism, historically, columnists have created alter egos who they supposedly interview but who speak for them. Finley Peter Dunne did Mr. Dooley. Mike Royko did Slats Grobnik. And William Raspberry always had the taxicab driver in Washington. Conliff had someone called Zorba the Freak—incredibly funny, incredibly well-written pieces that combine satire and commentary.

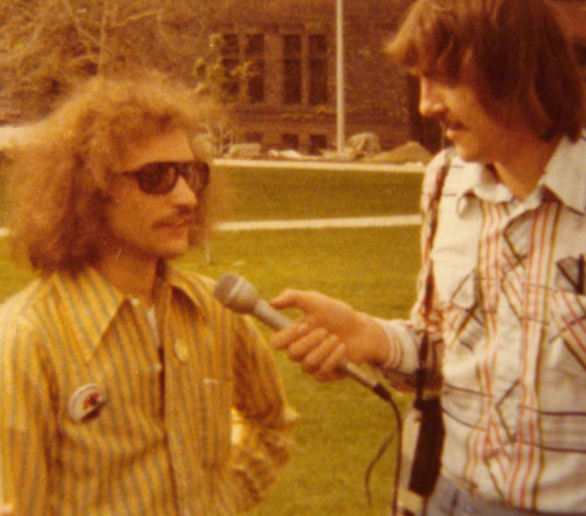
Steve Conliff gives interview to Ohio State Lantern reporter during his gubernatorial campaign, 1978

== Blacklisted News ==
With Dana Beal and the New Yippie Book Collective, Conliff published the 733-page anthology Blacklisted News: Secret Histories from Chicago 1968 to 1984, foreword by William Kunstler. Steve Conliff wrote over half of this volume, a detailed chronicle of specific Yippie actions all over the world (in the middle section titled "The Dreaded Yippie Curse") and a colorful collection of underground posters, jeremiads, essays, news clippings, comics, photos, articles, reviews and other counter-cultural history.

== Personal life ==
Conliff met artist Suzan Bird in 1970, while she was working in the hippie enclave of Pearl Alley, adjacent to the OSU campus:

He was selling Purple Berries, and he would come by E.G. Leather on Pearl Alley trying to get ads. It was one of the old hippie shops. I worked there at the time, so I would sit on the porch and talk to him, and we got to know each other fairly well just sitting and chatting.

The two married in 1973 and had three sons. Bird's art work often accompanied Conliff's written pieces, especially in Purple Berries and Sour Grapes.

Steve Conliff died of lung cancer on June 1, 2006.

== Bibliography ==
- We Are Not McGovernable: What Cronkite Didn't Tell You about the '72 Democratic Convention - Youth International Party, 1972
- Purple Berries and Sour Grapes - Ohio YIP periodicals, 1970-1974
- Subversive Scholastic 1978–1984
- Peace in Persia - Poetry inspired by the Iran hostage crisis, 1981
- Zeitgeist: The Ballad of Tom Forcade - A lyric 'epic' poem first published in full in Blacklisted News—has been excerpted numerous times as an obituary for Forcade and the "Zippies" (Zeitgeist International Party) -- the radical breakaway Yippie faction that demonstrated at the 1972 Republican and Democratic Conventions in Miami Beach.
- Blacklisted News: Secret Histories from Chicago, '68, to 1984 - Bleecker Publishing, 1983
- Chief Buffalo and The Green Arm - Two novels uploaded to the free internet in the early 00s, now unavailable, circa 2003
- 8060 Olentangy River Road posthumously published, 2010
