= Nancy Kurshan =

American activist (born 1944)

- Born: February 4, 1944 (age 82)
- Occupation: Founder of Youth International Party
- Known for: Activism

Nancy Sarah Kurshan (born February 4, 1944, in Brooklyn, NY) is an American activist, raised as a "red diaper baby", and best known for being a founder of the Youth International Party (whose members were popularly known as Yippies).

== Early life and activism ==
Kurshan was a participant in the civil rights and peace movements as far back as high school. During her college years in Madison, Wisconsin, she was a member of Friends of SNCC (the Student Nonviolent Coordinating Committee) and CORE, and participated in the first demonstration against the Vietnam War in Washington, D.C., in April 1965. She then began to pursue a Ph.D. in psychology at UC Berkeley where she met Jerry Rubin. She dropped out to join Rubin in New York where they worked for the Mobe (National Mobilization Committee to End the War in Vietnam) on the 1967 demo to shut down the Pentagon.

Kurshan initiated a guerrilla theater women's group called W.I.T.C.H. (Women's International Terrorist Conspiracy from Hell) along with Robin Morgan, Sharon Krebs, and Roz Payne. When Rubin appeared in front of HUAC (House Un-American Activities Committee) dressed as an international guerrilla, she joined him, appearing as a witch to put a hex on HUAC. At the conclusion of the "Chicago Conspiracy Trial", when all the defendants were initially found guilty, Kurshan and Anita Hoffman burned judges' robes during a press conference as a denunciation of the guilty verdict (which was later reversed on appeal). Photos of this action appeared on front pages all across the world.

Robin Morgan wrote about Kurshan in her famous essay entitled "Goodbye to All That". Morgan suggested that Kurshan and many other women (Morgan among them) needed to free themselves from the male domination of the left and their respective partners. In 1970 Kurshan traveled to North Vietnam on an all-women's trip that included Judy Gumbo and Jeanne Plamandon of the White Panther Party.

Not long after, Kurshan left Rubin. She then went on to join the Weather Underground as a public member until its demise. She participated for many years thereafter in the efforts to free political prisoners such as the Puerto Rican political prisoners, Sundiata Acoli, Geronimo Pratt, and many others. She was active in the fight against control unit prisons as a founding member of the Committee to End the Marion Lockdown. She has also authored a popular analysis called "Women And Imprisonment in the United States", which has appeared in countless texts and books about prisons and repression, and in 2013, the Freedom Archives published Out of Control, her book about the battle to end control unit prisons.

== Personal life ==
Kurshan is Jewish. Along the way, Kurshan married Chicago epidemiologist Steve Whitman, raised two children, got a master's degree in social work and worked for 20 years as a social worker in the Chicago Public Schools. Whitman died in 2014.

== In popular culture ==
Mayim Bialik plays Kurshan in the 2011 film The Chicago 8.
