= Stew Albert =

American political activist (1939–2006)

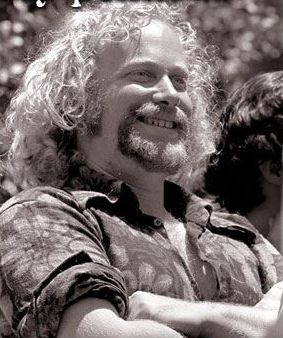
- Born: December 4, 1939; New York City, U.S.
- Died: January 30, 2006 (aged 66); Portland, Oregon, U.S.
- Known for: Political activism, writing
- Spouse: Judy Gumbo

Stewart Edward "Stew" Albert (December 4, 1939 – January 30, 2006) was an early member of the Yippies, an anti-Vietnam War political activist, and an important figure in the New Left movement of the 1960s.

== NYC ==
Born in the Sheepshead Bay section of Brooklyn, New York, to a New York City employee, he had a relatively conventional political life in his youth, though he was among those who protested the execution of Caryl Chessman. Albert was Jewish. He graduated from Pace University, where he majored in politics and philosophy, and worked for a while for the City of New York welfare department.

== San Francisco ==
In 1965, he left New York for San Francisco, where he met the poet Allen Ginsberg at the City Lights Bookstore. Within a few days, he was volunteering at the Vietnam Day Committee in Berkeley, California. It was there he met Jerry Rubin and Abbie Hoffman, with whom he co-founded the Youth International Party or Yippies. He also met Bobby Seale and other Black Panther Party members there and became a full-time political activist. Rubin once said that Albert was a better educator than most of the professors.

== Activism ==
Among the many activities he participated in with the Yippies were throwing money off the balcony at the New York Stock Exchange, the Exorcism of the Pentagon, and the 1968 Presidential campaign of a pig named Pigasus. He was arrested at the disturbances outside the 1968 Democratic National Convention and was named as an unindicted co-conspirator in the Chicago Seven case. His wife Judy Gumbo Albert claimed, according to his New York Times obituary, that this was because he was working as a correspondent for the Berkeley Barb. Later, he would work closely with the Berkeley Tribe underground newspaper and lived at the Tribe's commune when he was not traveling for political engagements.

== 1970 ==
In 1970, he ran for sheriff of Alameda County, California, in revenge for "getting my balls sprayed with hot, painful chemicals as a welcome-to-prison health measure" after being arrested in 1969. Although he lost to the incumbent, Frank Madigan, Albert garnered 65,000 votes, in an ironic twist, in a race with the sheriff who had supervised his earlier incarceration during the Vietnam Day Committee anti-draft protests in downtown Oakland.

== 1971 ==
After the Weather Underground helped Timothy Leary escape from a California prison, where he had been imprisoned for possessing LSD, Albert helped arrange for Leary to stay with Eldridge Cleaver in Algeria. In 1971, he was subpoenaed before several grand juries investigating the political bombing of the U. S. Capitol by the Weather Underground in March 1971, as well as a conspiracy by the Piggy Bank Six to bomb several branches of First National City Bank in Manhattan the previous year. He was not charged in either case.

== 1978 ==
In the early 1970s, he and his wife sued the FBI for planting an illegal wiretap in his house. They won a $20,000 settlement and, in 1978, two FBI supervisors were fired for this action.

== Oregon ==
In 1984, he and his wife moved to Portland, Oregon. They co-edited an anthology, The Sixties Papers: Documents of a Rebellious Decade, that collected material that originated in the Civil Rights Movement, Students for a Democratic Society, the anti-war movement, the counterculture, and the women's movement.

His memoir, Who the Hell is Stew Albert?, was published by Red Hen Press in 2005. He ran the Yippie Reading Room until he died of liver cancer brought on by hepatitis in 2006. Two days before his death, he posted on his blog, "My politics haven't changed."

== In popular culture ==
In the 2000 film Steal This Movie! Albert is played by Donal Logue.

== See also ==
- List of peace activists

== Sources ==
- The Spies Who Thought We Were Messy by Stew Albert
- Almost Sheriff Yippie by Stew Albert
- Associated Press obituary 1 February 2006
