= Robert M. Ockene =

Robert M. Ockene (1934 – December 2, 1969) was a book editor, anti-war activist, co-founder of the Youth International Party (the Yippies), and a founder of Veterans and Reservists to End the War in Vietnam. He was an editor at Grossman Publishers where he edited and produced the book that brought Ralph Nader to national attention, Unsafe at Any Speed. Later, he became an executive editor at Bobbs-Merrill Company.

He attended the March on the Pentagon in October 1967. There, he conceived the idea that the counter-cultural hippies of the anti-war movement needed leadership distinct from the political new left leaders of the movement. He met with Jerry Rubin, Abbie Hoffman, and Paul Krassner during November and December 1967 to develop the idea into what became the Youth International Party, or Yippies.

Also in 1967, Ockene helped organize Supports-in-Action, a group which grew into the prominent Vietnam-era draft resistance organization, Resist. He was also a noted war tax protester, and was a signatory of the Writers and Editors War Tax Protest.

Ockene died of leukemia on December 2, 1969.
