= Steven Whitman =

American public health academic (1943–2014)

- Born: May 19, 1943; Brooklyn, New York, U.S.
- Died: July 21, 2014 (aged 71); Chicago, Illinois, U.S.
- Education: University of Pittsburgh; Yale University
- Occupations: Social epidemiologist and public health researcher

Steven Whitman (May 19, 1943 – July 21, 2014) was an American social epidemiologist and public health researcher.

== Early life and education ==
Whitman was born on May 19, 1943, in Brooklyn, New York, where he grew up in a poor household. He received his master's degree in biometrics from the University of Pittsburgh in 1964, followed by a master's degree in biostatistics from Yale University in 1968. He went on to receive his Ph.D. in biostatistics from Yale in 1969.

== Career ==
Whitman joined the faculty of Miles College in Birmingham, Alabama, after graduating from Yale. He also taught at other institutions in Birmingham, such as Holy Family Catholic High School, before joining the faculty of Chicago's Northwestern University in 1978. At Northwestern, he was a senior epidemiologist at the Center for Urban Affairs and Policy Research (since renamed the Institute for Policy Research) from 1978 to 1991. In 1991, he left the faculty of Northwestern to join the Chicago Department of Public Health as deputy commissioner and director of the epidemiology program. In 2000, he was hired to found the Sinai Urban Health Institute (SUHI), at which point he left the Chicago Department of Public Health. He served the head of the SUHI from 2000 until his death.

== Research ==
As head of the Chicago Department of Public Health's epidemiology program, Whitman played a major role in studying and explaining the 1995 Chicago heat wave. At the SUHI, he conducted research on racial disparities in breast cancer mortality among women in Chicago and other American cities. He also researched racial disparities in health in the United States more generally.

== Death ==
Whitman died of cancer on July 21, 2014, at Rush University Medical Center in Chicago; he was 71 years old. He is survived by his wife, Nancy Kurshan and their two children, adoptive daughter Rosa Kurshan-Emmer and adoptive son Michael Kurshan-Emmer, along with his adoptive daughter, professor and writer Imani Perry (from his marriage to Theresa Perry).
