= Dana Beal =

American social and political activist

Dana Beal at an event at Washington Square Park in 2025

Dana Beal speaking at Northeastern University during the Boston Ibogaine Forum, January 2009

Irvin Dana Beal (born January 9, 1947, in Ravenna, Ohio) is an American social and political activist, best known for his efforts to legalize marijuana and to promote the benefits of ibogaine as an addiction treatment. He is a founder and long-term activist in the Youth International Party (Yippies), and founded the Yipster Times newspaper in 1972. The Yipster Times was renamed Overthrow in 1978, and ended publication in 1989.

== History and activism ==
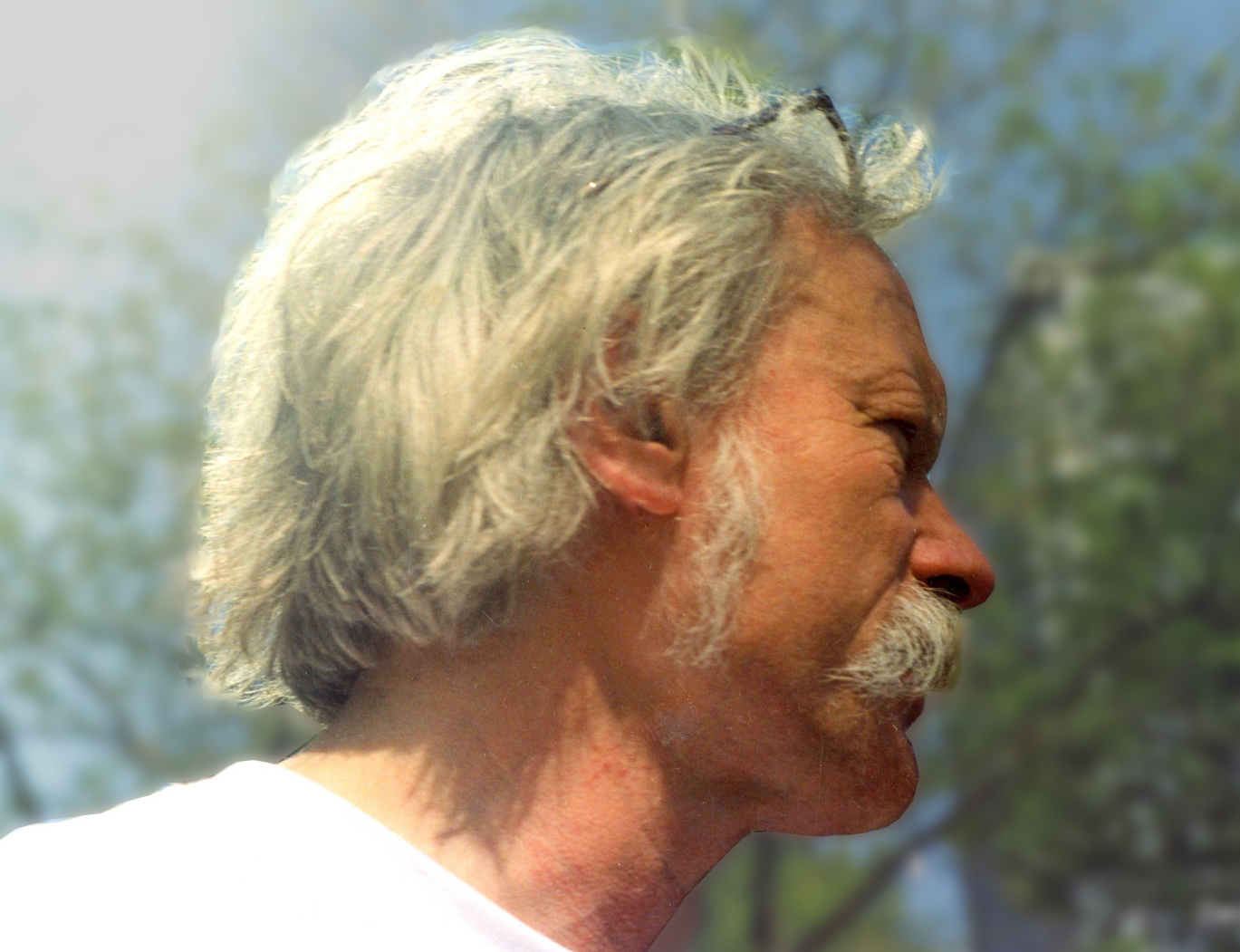
Beal sometime in the early-to-mid 1990s

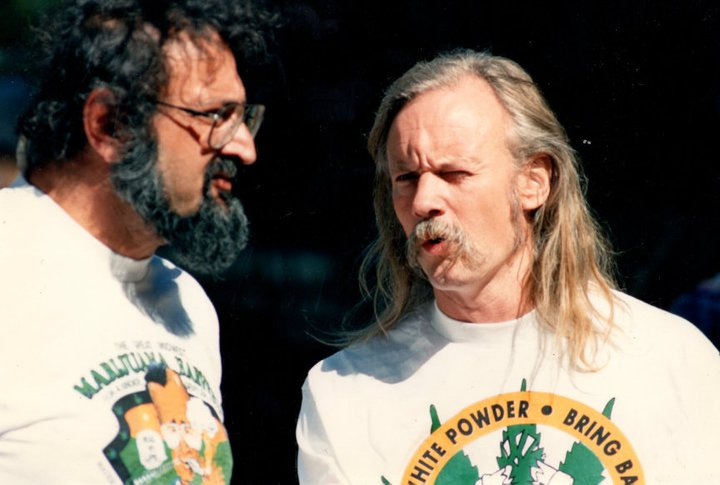
Jack Herer and Beal at the September 1989 Great Midwest Marijuana Harvest Fest in Madison, Wisconsin, organized by fellow Yippie and legalization activist Ben Masel

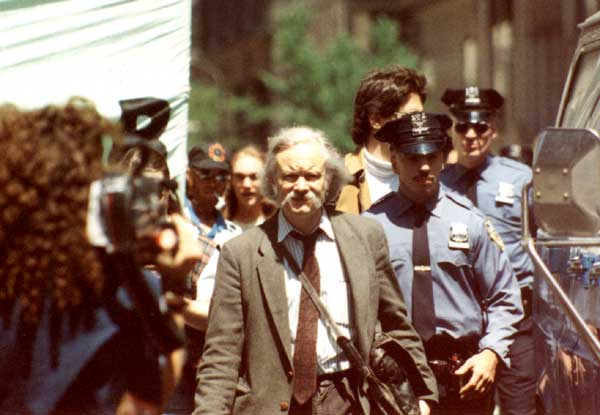
Beal marches at the head of the New York City Marijuana March in 1994.

Beal was born in Ravenna, Ohio, in 1947. In August 1963, he hitchhiked to Washington, D.C., to attend the March on Washington and heard Martin Luther King Jr.'s "I Have a Dream" speech. In October 1963, Beal organized a demonstration of 2000 people to protest the Ku Klux Klan's 16th Street Baptist Church bombing in Birmingham.

In 1971, The New York Times referred to Beal as a "major theoretician and behind‐the‐scenes leader of the underground youth movement.":

Beal was described in interviews as a founder of several radical youth groups, including the Yippies, and as organizer of many "pro‐pot" demonstrations, such as the second annual smoke‐in and anti‐C.I.A. heroin march held in Washington July 4.

His friends and associates identified Beal, who does not use his first name, Irvin, as one of the first movement writers to argue for a merger of political radicalism and the psychedelic life style ... Abbie Hoffman and Jerry Rubin, Yippie leaders who garnered national attention during the 1968 Democratic convention demonstrations, agreed in separate telephone interviews that Beal was an important figure in the movement.

"He is a unique blend of a street person and a theoretician," said Mr. Hoffman. "His writings are far more important and impressive than people like me and Jerry Rubin."

Mr. Rubin said Beal's writings "were a strong force in helping us understand who we are." ... Mr. Hoffman and Mr. Rubin said Beal's most important works were "Right on Culture Freaks" and "Weather Yippie," which were rèprinted in more than 100 underground newspapers in this country and abroad.

The articles called for more militancy on the part of young radicals but criticized what Beal saw as the élitism and lack of humanity in the more violent radical groups.

Dana Beal also helped organize some of the U.S. versions of the "Rock Against Racism" concerts.

== Global Marijuana March ==
The worldwide Global Million Marijuana March (GMM or MMM) event began in 1999 with Beal as the major organizer. It now takes place in hundreds of cities around the world in addition to New York City, which has had various marijuana rallies since 1967.

Beal has a long history of marijuana activism both inside and outside of New York City, and has often been called "The Lenin of the Marijuana Movement". In July 1972 in Miami Beach, Florida Beal was one of the organizers of a Zippie-led marijuana smoke-in outside the 1972 Democratic Convention.

== Ibogaine ==
Beal has promoted ibogaine as an addiction interrupter. He asserts that addiction is a disease that can be treated with ibogaine.

Beal helped to organize the Boston Ibogaine Forum held in February 2009 at Northeastern University. During the forum, he gave a presentation on the chemistry and pharmacology of ibogaine. Beal also participated in the Ibogaine Forum held at the University of Otago, New Zealand, on 5 and 6 September 2009, as well as a similar information-session in the Netherlands in 2017.

Beal also helped to organize the European Ibogaine Forum, September 2017 in Vienna.

== Social engagement ==
Beal's "Cures Not Wars" site included information on the Global Marijuana March and the use of ibogaine in addiction treatment. He also works on behalf of people with AIDS and cancer who frequently require medical marijuana. Beal was given an honorary board seat on the 'New York State Committee To Legalize Marijuana' on 4/20/2015 by Dennis Levy, the HIV+ African American President.

In 2015, prompted by New York's Compassionate Care Act, Beal organized a patients' rights group, which drafted a bill requesting that NYC's City Council administer users' cooperatives for patients who need medical marijuana:

"We're trying to set up a five-borough patients co-op for people with serious maladies, including ones that aren't on the state list," says Dana Beal, a longtime cannabis activist and one of about ten contributors to the bill. "The law and the regulations don't cover people who are [also] legitimate patients. We believe that under home rule, we can extend better availability and better prices to more people.

During the 2016 US presidential election campaign, Beal organized a demonstration in Scranton, Pennsylvania, in which pro-cannabis activists carried a 51-foot, inflatable marijuana joint to a Hillary Clinton rally, while also passing around "an open letter to Hillary Clinton" asking her to remove cannabis from the Controlled Substances Act.

== Yippie Museum ==
In 2004, the infamous Yippie "headquarters" at #9 Bleecker Street in New York City (also Beal's home for decades) officially became the Yippie Museum and Cafe and was legally chartered by the Board of Regents of New York State at their March 21, 2006, meeting. Its stated purpose was to preserve the activities and artifacts of the Youth International Party. Beal served on the museum/cafe's Board of Directors.

In January 2014, the 9 Bleecker Street building went into foreclosure. The old Yippie building was cleaned out, and in July 2014, the building was transformed into a Bowery-area boxing club called "Overthrow", deliberately retaining much of its original Yippie/60s-revolutionary decor. The boxing club would remain in the location for about a decade, until closing in November 2024 due to financial difficulties.

== Repeated arrests ==
=== Illinois (2008) ===
Beal was arrested June 3, 2008, in Mattoon, Illinois, about 170 miles south of Chicago, on suspicion of money laundering. The Associated Press reported that he appeared before a judge on June 12, and was charged with obstruction of justice. He was released on $7,500 bail.

According to The New York Times, police responded to a report of two women arguing at a restaurant. The two women were traveling with Beal and another man. Mick McAvoy is the first assistant state's attorney for Coles County, Illinois. According to the Times, "Mr. McAvoy said witnesses told the police that Mr. Beal had placed bags beneath nearby vehicles. Mr. McAvoy said the police found two duffel bags containing more than $150,000 in cash. At that point, Mr. McAvoy said, a drug-sniffing dog was brought in to smell the bags." According to Beal's attorney, Ronald Tulin of Charleston, Illinois, the police said the money smelled of marijuana. Beal has always said that the money was en route to support an ibogaine-based drug treatment clinic in Mexico.

On August 6, 2008, Judge Richard Scott found probable cause for a jury trial for Beal and Jesse Balcom, 31, of Silver Spring, Maryland. The trial began in November 2008 on obstruction of justice charges, because it was alleged that Beal and his associate were hiding the bags of money in expectation that the police might search their van. The outcome of the trial was that Beal pleaded guilty to misdemeanor marijuana possession and was fined $1,300. Obstruction of justice charges were dismissed. Federal authorities are seeking forfeiture of the money involved.

=== Nebraska (2009) ===
Beal, Christopher Ryan, and James Statzer were arrested at 10:35 p.m. on September 30, 2009, in Ashland, Nebraska. Police claim that they were stopped because the conversion van they were in was driving erratically, and because the rear license plate was obstructed. Police allegedly found 150 pounds of marijuana in the van. All three faced charges of possession with intent to deliver and having no drug tax stamp. Ryan and Statzer were held on $100,000 bond each. Beal was held on $500,000 bond. According to the Omaha World-Herald, Saunders County attorney Scott Tingelhoff said that there was an effort on the web to raise Beal's bail. He had to raise 10 percent ($50,000) in order to be released.

Beal was represented in his case by Glenn Shapiro of the law firm Schaefer and Shapiro in Omaha, Nebraska.

=== Arrest and conviction in Wisconsin (2011) ===
Beal was arrested on Jan. 6, 2011 with 186 pounds of marijuana during a traffic stop in Barneveld, Wisconsin. He and driver Lance Ramer of Omaha, Nebraska, were held on $50,000 bond each in the Iowa County Jail in Dodgeville. Authorities won't release the police report because federal officials say it might compromise a national drug investigation which runs "from California to New York, with multiple locations."

On September 20, 2011, Dana Beal was sentenced to 2 1/2 years in prison. He was credited with 267 days already served for the time he was in jail. He was also sentenced to 2 1/2 years parole after getting out of prison.

=== Heart attack and re-sentencing in Wisconsin (2011) ===
On September 27, 2011, the day he was to be transferred to a state prison in Wisconsin, Beal suffered a heart attack. He had a double bypass operation a week later. Due to the health issues and costs Beal was released on bail while in the hospital. He was re-sentenced on December 29. His prison sentence was reduced by six months.

Beal turned himself in to the Wisconsin prison system on February 15, 2012, to begin serving his sentence. One week later he had another, minor, heart attack. The next day a stent was placed in a coronary artery.

=== Bench trial and sentencing in Nebraska (2012) ===
On April 20, 2012, Beal was moved to the Saunders County jail in Wahoo, Nebraska, where he had a bench trial later that year, on August 27 related to the 2009 arrest. On December 10, 2012, Judge Mary Gilbride sentenced Beal to 4 to 6 years in prison in Nebraska. An appeal was filed. On December 26, 2012, Beal was moved from Nebraska back to Fox Lake Correctional Institution in Wisconsin.

=== Arrest in California (2017) ===
High Times account of the arrest of cannabis activist Dana Beal in December, 2017:

High Times' sources indicate the bust was on Highway 36, near the Humboldt-Trinity county line. This connects with Route 299, the main road that links Humboldt County on the coast to Interstate 5 in the Central Valley, over the rugged Trinity Alps.

The quantity Beal was caught with (22 lbs) usually results in an "own recognizance" release in Trinity County, meaning no bail. But this time, bail has reportedly been set at a steep $75,000—possibly due to Beal's notoriety and past record.

Beal is said to face two charges: misdemeanor possession of cannabis for sale and felony attempt to transport marijuana across state lines. His driver was also charged, identified as Michigan resident James Statzer.

Beal and Statzer have been arrested together before—most recently, a year ago this week in Oregon, after a state trooper stopped them for driving outside the line and over the speed limit. A search turned up 55 pounds of marijuana. In June, the Clackamas County district attorney declined to prosecute the case, citing irregularities in the search.

Beal and Statzer both entered pleas of not guilty. Beal was later released on bail. His lawyer had successfully argued that given age and health issues, he was not a flight risk. Statzer was also released on bail.

=== Arrest following Ukraine trip (2024) ===
In 2023, Beal travelled to Ukraine to promote ibogaine treatment for war veterans. He was reportedly detained when returning to the US in September 2023. He was subsequently arrested in Gooding County, Idaho in January 2024, and held on $250,000 bail.

As of March 13, 2024, Beal is free on bail, but not permitted to leave the US.

== Advocacy of Cynthia Nixon ==
In Spring 2018, Dana Beal supported New York gubernatorial candidate Cynthia Nixon, who spoke at the yearly New York City Cannabis parade in support of legalization.

== Joints for Jabs ==
In Spring 2021, Beal organized "Joints for Jabs NYC" in Union Square, encouraging vaccination against COVID-19:

[On] April 20, volunteers organized by Mr. Beal, members of the group ACT UP and others handed out more than a thousand joints to people who could show that they were at least 21 and had received a Covid vaccine. A similar distribution is planned for May 1 to coincide with an annual May Day marijuana march held in Manhattan.

As of October 2022, Beal was actively searching for a new home, as well as a method of manufacturing ibogaine in mass-market pill form.

On May 6, 2023, Beal gave a speech before the NYC Cannabis Parade, the first rally after a three-year hiatus.

== See also ==
- List of civil rights leaders
