= Nobody for President =

Parody political candidate

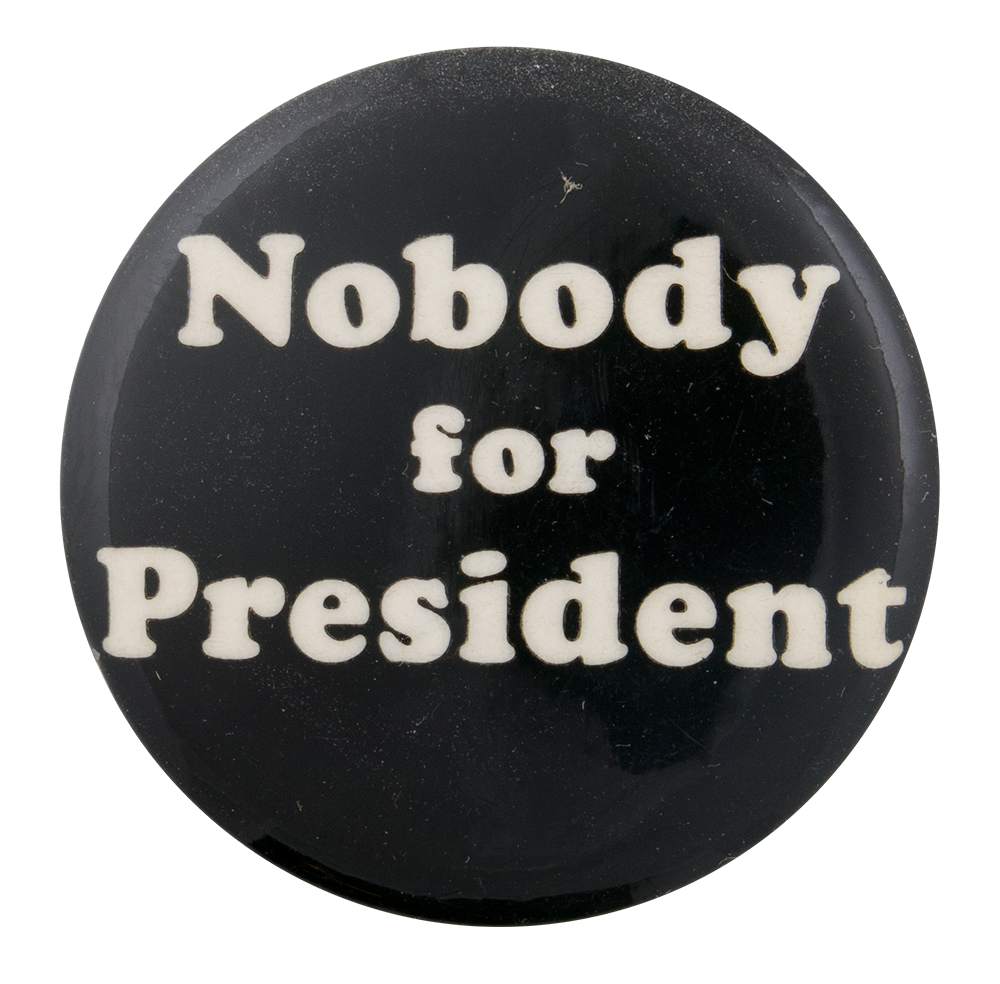
A 1976 Nobody for President campaign button

Nobody for President was a parodic campaign for the 1976 United States presidential election, as well as the 1980, 1984, and 1988 presidential elections.

Wavy Gravy, master of ceremonies for the Woodstock Festival and official clown of the Grateful Dead, is believed to have nominated Nobody at the Yippie national convention outside the Republican National Convention in Kansas City in 1976. Another of those responsible, Arthur Hoppe (a syndicated columnist for the San Francisco Chronicle) claims to have distributed "several thousand" Nobody for President campaign buttons and to have written "dozens of columns extolling Nobody's virtues." It was the second time the Yippies had nominated an ineligible candidate for the Presidency, following the nomination of a boar named Pigasus eight years prior.

The organizers of the campaign staged a ticker-tape parade down a boulevard in Berkeley, California, with motorcycle police flanking a convertible limousine occupied by nobody. The campaign's slogans included "Because Nobody Is In Washington Right Now, Working For You," "Nobody's Perfect," and "Nobody Should Have Too Much Power."

== See also ==
- Frivolous political party
- Non-human electoral candidates
- Uncommitted (voting option)
- Unabomber for President
- None of the Above
- Who's on First?
