= Pete Wagner =

American political cartoonist (born 1955)

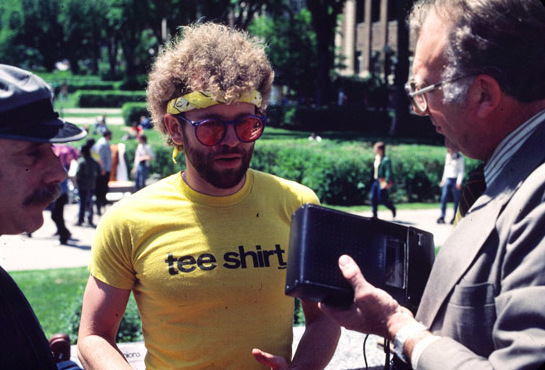
- Pete Wagner with Marv Davidov at Generic Demonstration, Univ. of MN, Minneapolis, 1982
- Born: January 26, 1955; Bay View, Milwaukee, Wisconsin
- Occupation(s): Political cartoonist, activist

Pete Wagner (born January 26, 1955) is an American political cartoonist, activist, author, scholar and caricature artist whose work has been published in over 300 newspapers and other periodicals. His cartoons and activist theatrics have been the subject of controversy and media attention.

== Cartooning career ==
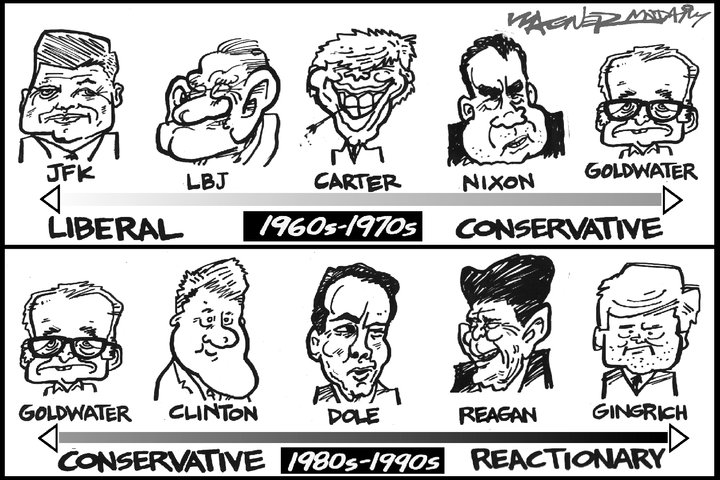
1998 political cartoon Wagner drew for the Minnesota Daily

Wagner was influenced by Sanders to work in an acerbic, hard-hitting style of political cartooning with connections to punk subculture. His main goal is "to get people to focus on an issue and provoke a response", he said in 1999. Despite the uncompromising tone, several of the public figures featured in his cartoons asked for copies of the drawing for themselves or their office, such as Minnesota Governor Rudy Perpich, University of Wisconsin-Milwaukee J. Martin Klotsche, United States Senator Paul Wellstone and one mayor of Madison.

Wagner's political cartoons were syndicated by the Collegiate Press Service from 1973 to 1976, but also by large-circulation publications such as Time magazine and The Washington Post, as well as The Progressive, In These Times, High Times and, briefly in 1977, Hustler magazine.

Wagner's cartoons won a national Society of Professional Journalists award in 1976 for a cartoon drawn while at the Minnesota Daily, six more SPJ awards between 1985 and 1991 for cartoons drawn while at City Pages, an honorable mention in the John Fischetti competition and several Minnesota Newspaper Association awards, also while at City Pages. One of his cartoons was shown in an exhibit at the Whitney Museum of Art in New York.

As of 2021, he still works as a caricature artist performing at private events, as an entertainer and drawing commissioned pieces from photographs.

== Activism ==
Wagner described himself in the 1970s and 1980s as "an activist who also happens to be a cartoonist". He frequently used guerrilla theatre that fueled controversies. He protested speaking engagements by many leading conservative of the time, such as Anita Bryant, Ronald Reagan and Jerry Falwell in ways that attracted media attention. He ran for student president of the University of Minnesota in 1976, under the "Tupperware Party".

Several of his protests were organized with the same group of people, which he named The Brain Trust. The final action of the group, an unthemed protest to which several thousand people were invited to bring their own issues, took place in 1982. The protest inspired one in the same style in Denver later in the Summer.

Wagner's political activism also has taken the form of multimedia political comedy shows, one of which toured 33 colleges in the late 1970s and early 1980s. He also edited a local humor magazine called "Minne HA! HA! - The Twin Cities' Sorely Needed Humor Magazine" sporadically between 1978 and 1993).

Wagner has worked with Minneapolis environmental activist Leslie Davis, joining Davis as his running mate in Davis' bid for governor of Minnesota in 2002.

== Books ==
- Wagner, Pete, Buy This Book. A Charter Member of the Slandered Seventies Sticks up for the Me Generation, 1980.
- Wagner, Pete, "Buy This Too". 1987.
