= Pigasus (politics) =

Pig and political candidate

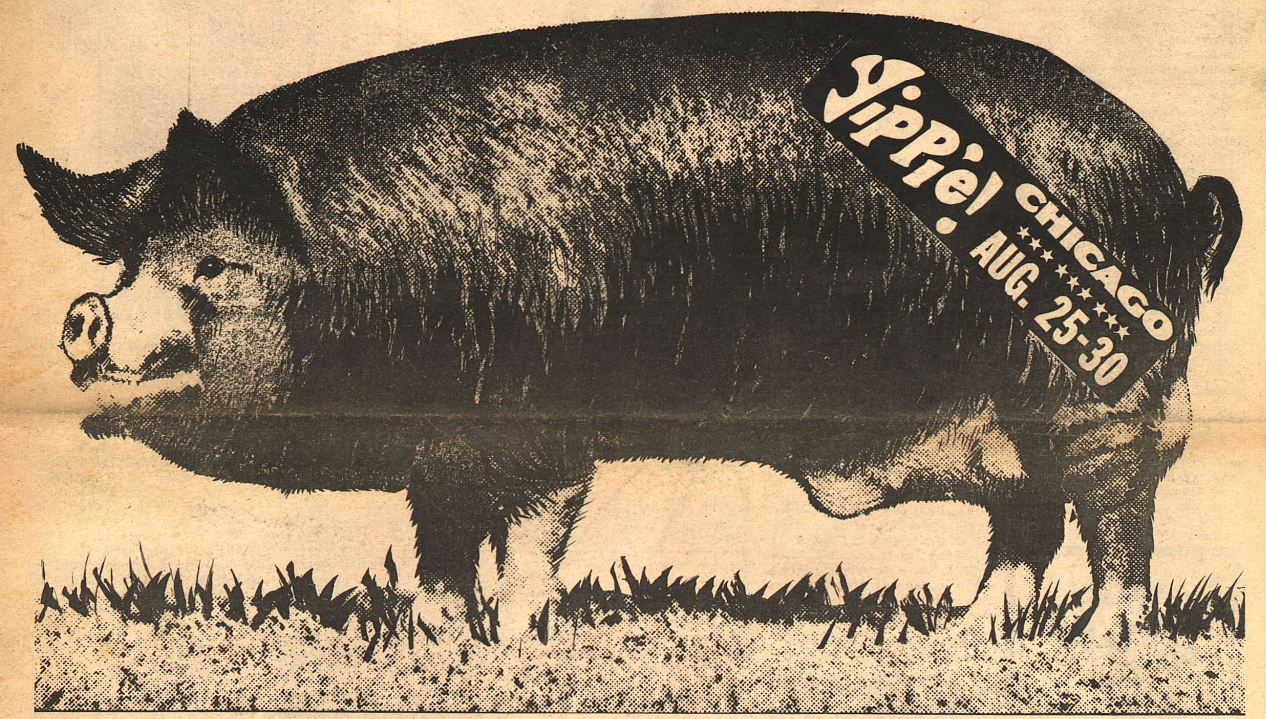
- An illustration of Pigasus from Berkeley Barb, 1968

1968 candidate for President of the United States

Personal details
- Party: Youth International Party

Pigasus, also known as Pigasus the Immortal and Pigasus J. Pig, was a 145-pound (66 kg) domestic pig that was nominated for President of the United States as a theatrical gesture by the Youth International Party on August 23, 1968, just before the opening of the Democratic National Convention in Chicago, Illinois. The youth-oriented party (whose members were commonly called "Yippies") was an anti-establishment and countercultural revolutionary group whose views were inspired by the free speech and anti-war movements of the 1960s, mainly the opposition to United States involvement in the Vietnam War.

Yippies were known for using dramatic theatrics in their demonstrations, and they used Pigasus as a way to mock the social status quo. At a rally announcing his candidacy, Pigasus was confiscated by Chicago policemen and several of his Yippie backers were arrested for disorderly conduct.

== Campaign for U.S. President ==
In 1968, Pigasus was nominated for the U.S. presidency by the Youth International Party (Yippies). The pig's name was a play on the name Pegasus, the winged horse in Greek mythology.

Selected for the campaign by group members Dennis Dalrymple, Abbie Hoffman and Jerry Rubin, candidate Pigasus was obtained from a farmer by folk-singer and fellow Yippie Phil Ochs. According to Hoffman the pig was acquired in Belvidere, Illinois. His candidacy was announced during the massive protests leading up to and during the 1968 Democratic National Convention in Chicago.

One reason why the Yippies preferred Pigasus was that "if we can't have him in the White House, we can have him for breakfast."

== Press conference and arrests ==
The nomination of Pigasus for president occurred on the morning of August 23, 1968, at the Chicago Civic Center (subsequently renamed as the Richard J. Daley Center) in front of the Picasso sculpture.

Pigasus was transported to the rally in a station wagon, escorted by seven Yippies. There were 50 Yippies carrying campaign signs and handing out literature. There were about 200 spectators on hand, along with ten uniformed Chicago policemen and several detectives, under the personal supervision of 1st District Commander James Riordan. The pig was placed in a police wagon and taken to the Chicago Anti-Cruelty Society.

Jerry Rubin was in the process of reading the "acceptance speech" for him when Pigasus was "arrested" by the police. Seven Yippies, including Jerry Rubin and Phil Ochs, were arrested and charged with disorderly conduct. The driver of the station wagon was also charged with obstructing traffic. Rubin later said that a policeman came to the jail cell and said "You guys are all going to jail for the rest of your lives—the pig squealed on you!" However, the Yippies were released after each posted a $25 bond.

== After the 1968 Democratic convention ==
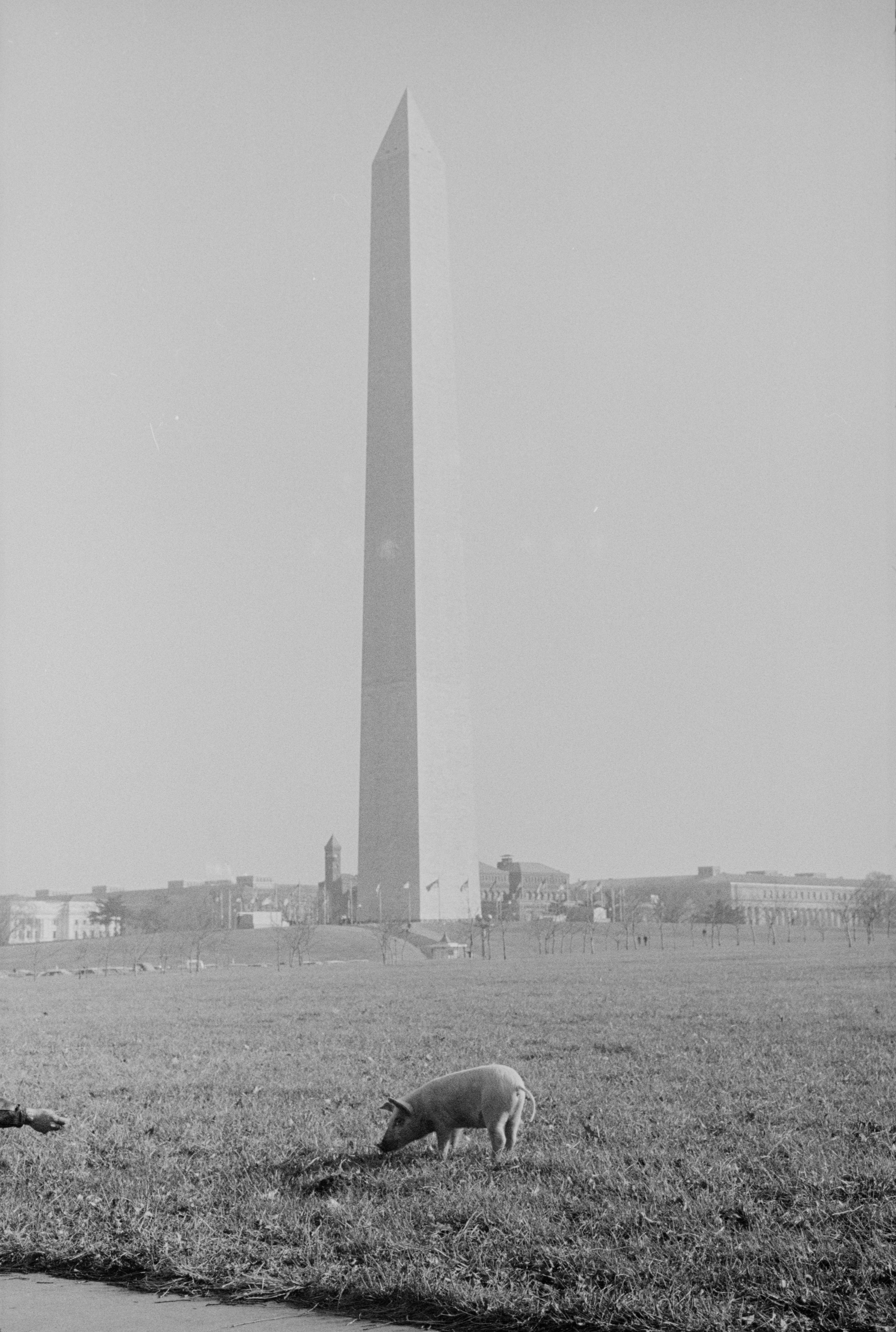
Pigasus J. Pig in front of the Washington Monument during his 1969 inhoguration

Sources vary on the fate of Pigasus. There is some speculation that a police officer ate him.

The Chicago Tribune, on September 30, 1968, said that after Pigasus was taken into custody by Chicago police, they transported him to the Anti-Cruelty Society, along with a sow called "Mrs. Pigasus", and a piglet, all collected after being paraded by the Yippies as part of their demonstrations around the time of the convention. The swine were later transferred to a farm in Grayslake, Illinois.

Five months after the nomination of Pigasus, during the inauguration ceremony of President Richard Nixon, the Yippies held their own "in-HOG-uration" ceremony – for President Pigasus.

Eight years after the Pigasus stunt, the Yippies would nominate another candidate for President: Nobody.

Many years later, The New York Times obituaries for Dennis Dalrymple, Abbie Hoffman and Jerry Rubin all highlighted the nomination of Pigasus for President during the Democratic Convention of 1968 as an extraordinary moment in political theater.

== See also ==
- List of individual pigs
- List of practical joke topics
- Chicago Seven
- Tactical frivolity
- 1968 Democratic National Convention protests
- Cornelius the First (from Rhinoceros Party)
