= Jerry Rubin =

American social activist and counterculture icon (1938–1994)

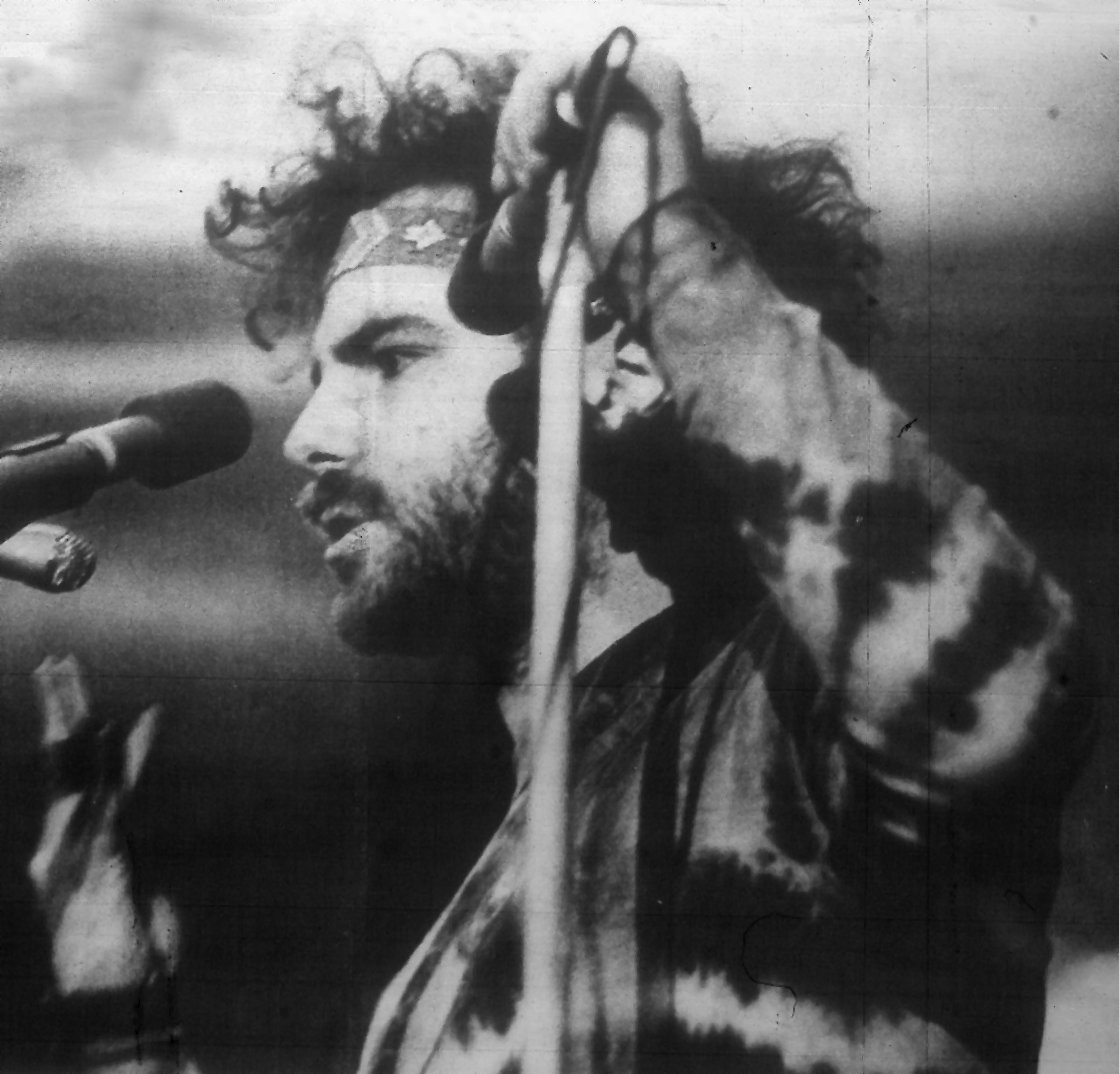
- Rubin in 1970
- Born: Jerry Clyde Rubin; July 14, 1938; Cincinnati, Ohio, U.S.
- Died: November 28, 1994 (aged 56); Los Angeles, California, U.S.
- Education: Oberlin College; Hebrew University; University of Cincinnati (BA); University of California, Berkeley
- Spouse: Mimi Leonard (1978–1992)
- Children: 2

Jerry Clyde Rubin (July 14, 1938 – November 28, 1994) was an American social activist, anti-war leader, and counterculture icon during the 1960s and early 1970s. Despite being known for holding radical views when he was a political activist, he ceased holding his more extreme views at some point in the 1970s and instead opted for a successful career as a businessman. In the 1960s, during his political activism heyday, he was known for being one of the co-founders of the Youth International Party (YIP) whose members were referred to as Yippies, and standing trial in the Chicago Seven case.

== Early life and education ==
Rubin was born in Cincinnati, Ohio, the son of Esther (Katz), a homemaker, and Robert Rubin, a trucker who later became a Teamsters' union official.

Rubin attended Cincinnati's Walnut Hills High School, co-editing the school newspaper, The Chatterbox and graduating in 1956. While in high school Rubin began to write for The Cincinnati Post, compiling sports scores from high school games. He attended Oberlin College, and Hebrew University in Jerusalem, and later went on to graduate from the University of Cincinnati, receiving a degree in history. Rubin attended the University of California, Berkeley in 1964 but dropped out to focus on social activism.

Rubin's parents died within ten months of each other, leaving Rubin to take care of his younger brother, Gil, who was 13 at the time. Jerry wanted to teach Gil about the world and planned to take him to India. When relatives threatened to sue to obtain custody of Gil, Jerry decided to take his brother to Israel instead, settling in Tel Aviv. There, Rubin worked on a kibbutz, and studied sociology while his brother, who had learned Hebrew, decided to stay in Israel and moved permanently to a kibbutz. Before returning to social and political activism, Rubin made a visit to Havana, to learn first-hand about the Cuban revolution.

== Social activism ==
Rubin began to demonstrate on behalf of various left-wing causes after dropping out of UC Berkeley. Rubin also ran for mayor of Berkeley, on a platform opposing the Vietnam War, and supporting Black power and the legalization of marijuana, receiving over 20 percent of the vote. Rubin turned his attention to political protest, his first in Berkeley, protesting against the refusal of a local grocer to hire African Americans. Soon Rubin was leading protests of his own. Rubin organized the Vietnam Day Committee, that led some of the first big protests against the Vietnam War. He took part in planning the world's largest teach-in against the war, organized rallies and demonstrations that attempted to stop a train transporting troops to the Oakland Army Base, as well as trucks carrying napalm. The Vietnam Day Committee was a unique early antiwar organization in that it enjoyed large local participation and is believed to be a forerunner to the national movement against the war in Vietnam.

Rubin was one of the founding members of the Youth International Party (YIP) or Yippies, along with social and political activist Abbie Hoffman and satirist Paul Krassner. The Yippies were not a formal organization with a membership list or a direct relationship with constituency but played upon the media's appetite for anything new and different. They were influenced by Marshall McLuhan's ideas on the importance of electronic communication and believed that if radical events were made more entertaining the media, especially television would give them greater coverage.

As Rubin recollected:

... [T]he more visual and surreal the stunts we could cook up, the easier it would be to get on the news, and the more weird and whimsical and provocative the theater, the better it would play.

Rubin's appearance before the House Un-American Activities Committee (HUAC) hearings is a good example of the Yippies’ emphasis on conducting political protest as theater, and drawing as much attention as possible to their dissent by turning it into a spectacle. Rubin was subpoenaed by HUAC in Washington but instead of pleading the Fifth Amendment as was common, he entered the room dressed in a rented 18th-century American Revolutionary War uniform, proudly claiming to be a descendant of Jefferson and Paine. "Nothing is more American than revolution," he told the committee. Rubin, showing a total lack of concern or worries, lightheartedly blew soap bubbles as members of Congress questioned his Communist affiliations. He subsequently appeared before the HUAC as a bare-chested guerrilla in Viet Cong pajamas, with war paint and carrying a toy M-16 rifle, and later as Santa Claus.

As Martin A. Lee and Bruce Shlain remark in their book Acid Dreams:

It was a political ploy designed to make a mockery of the HUAC proceedings; the congressmen were caught off guard, and Rubin's stunt became page-one news throughout the country.

Another media stunt that gave the Yippies free publicity, not only in the United States but all over the world, was when Rubin, Hoffman and others brought the New York Stock Exchange to a halt by tossing money into the air and watched gleefully as stockbrokers scrambled to collect bills.

Yet another successful act in Yippies "guerrilla theater" was when during the Democratic National Convention of 1968 the Youth International Party nominated their own candidate for the presidency. The nominee was Pigasus the Immortal, a 145-pound (66 kg) pig that they felt was an appropriate alternative to Richard Nixon, Vice President Hubert Humphrey and Alabama governor George Wallace. At the official introductions at Pigasus' first press conference, Rubin, while holding the candidate in his arms, demanded he be given Secret Service protection and be brought to the White House for a foreign policy briefing. He also promised, on behalf of Pigasus, a fair election campaign and if Pigasus won the election he would be eaten. This would, maintained Rubin, reverse the usual democratic process in which the pig is elected "and proceeds to eat the people."

In his book DO IT!: Scenarios of the Revolution Rubin says "media does not report "news," it creates it. An event happens when it goes on TV and becomes a myth." He goes on to say:

TV time goes to those with the most guts and imagination. I never understood the radical who comes on TV in a suit and tie. Turn off the sound and he could be the mayor! The words may be radical, but the television is a non-verbal instrument! The way to understand TV is to shut off the sound. No one remembers any words they hear; the mind is a technicolor movie of images, not words. I've never seen "bad" coverage of a demonstration. It makes no difference what they say about us. The picture is the story.

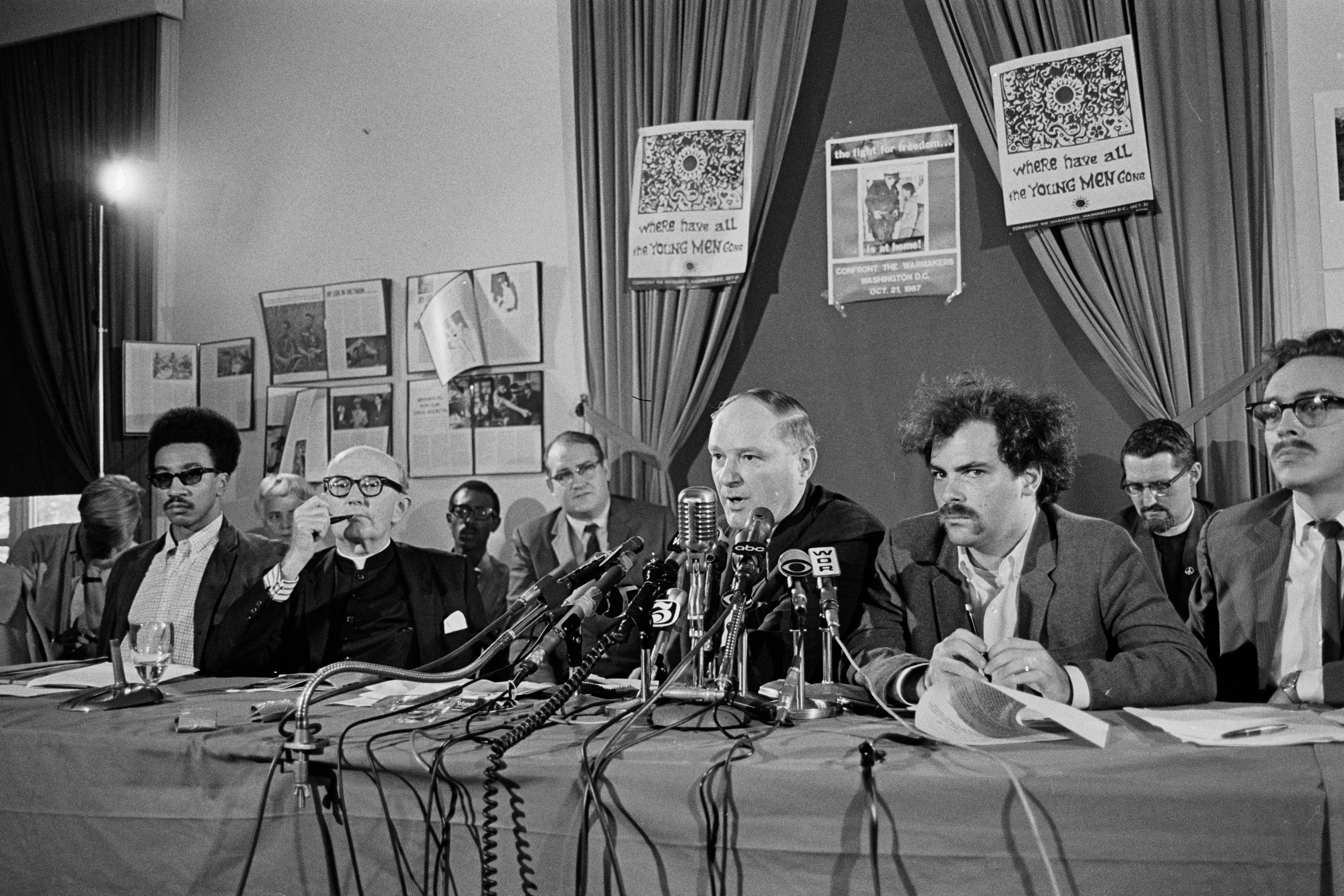
Rubin (far right) at an anti-war press conference, August 1967

In October 1967, David Dellinger of the National Mobilization Committee to End the War in Vietnam asked Rubin to help mobilize and direct a March on the Pentagon. The protesters gathered at the Lincoln Memorial as Dellinger and Dr. Benjamin Spock gave speeches to the mass of people.

From there, the group marched towards the Pentagon. As the protesters neared the Pentagon, they were met by soldiers of the 82nd Airborne Division. who formed a human barricade blocking the Pentagon steps. Not to be dissuaded, Hoffman vowed to levitate the Pentagon while Allen Ginsberg led Tibetan chants to assist. Eventually, things turned ugly. By the time the group's 48-hour permit expired, approximately 680 protesters had been jailed and 50 hospitalized.

As one member of the march recalled:

Then someone in authority decided that the Pentagon steps had to be cleared. Rifle butts came down on people's heads with dull, ugly, wet-sounding thumps. Blood splashed on to the steps. There were shouts of "Link arms! Link arms!", mixed with screams of pain and curses. People were dragged off and arrested. The brutality was appalling and the people standing on the steps began throwing debris at the soldiers. I saw a garbage can sail over my head. I feared people might be trampled in panic as they tried to escape from the clubs and rifle butts.

In spite of the brutality of the police, the spirits of the demonstrators were not dampened. Many were exhilarated by what had transpired and some felt it was an event that would mark a turning point. "It made me see we could build a movement by knocking off American symbols," said Rubin. He added:

We had symbolically destroyed the Pentagon, the symbol of the war machine, by throwing blood on it, by pissing on it, dancing on it ... painting 'Che lives' on it. It was a total cultural attack on the Pentagon. The media had communicated this all over the country and lots of people identified with us, the besiegers.

Rubin later played an instrumental role in the anti-war demonstration that accompanied the 1968 Democratic National Convention in Chicago by helping to organize the Yippie "Festival of Life" in Lincoln Park. He spoke along with Hoffman at an anti-war rally at the Grant Park bandshell on August 28, 1968, and instructed demonstrators to resist if a riot broke out. The extent of violence between Chicago police and demonstrators (which an official government report called a "police riot") was not anticipated by the Yippie leaders. Some 1,500 people were injured. The arrest and trial of the Yippie leaders (known later as the Chicago Conspiracy Trial) which began on September 24, 1969, eventually led to the trial of Rubin and seven others on charges of incitement to riot, including Hoffman, Rennie Davis, John Froines, David Dellinger, Lee Weiner, Tom Hayden, and Bobby Seale.

The defendants were commonly referred to as the "Chicago Eight". Seale's trial was severed from the others after he demanded the right to serve as his own lawyer and was sentenced to four years in prison for contempt of court, making the Chicago Eight the Chicago Seven. The trial developed into a quiet spectacle, or "hippie-guerillas theater" as Rubin described it. Rubin, Hoffman and other defendants made a mockery of the court, widely covered by the press, with The New York Times and The Washington Post reporting on it. Rubin, who had declared the trial to be "the Academy Award of protest" at one point paraded back and forth in front of Judge Julius Hoffman (no relation to defendant Hoffman), thrusting his arm in a Nazi salute and shouting "Heil Hitler!" Another time he and Hoffman wore judge's robes to court. Judge Hoffman ordered both men to remove the robes. They did – but underneath they wore blue Chicago police shirts. "The day Abbie and I came in wearing judges' robes was a stoned idea," Rubin said later. "It was a turning point in the trial in terms of theatrics, and it just went on from there."

In spite of the danger of being busted, Rubin smoked marijuana before the trial. "I got stoned a lot for the trial because it was such complete theater – a front-row seat to history – and marijuana intensifies every experience." Judge Hoffman added to the spectacle. Among other things, Judge Hoffman ordered for Black Panther leader Bobby Seale to be bound, gagged, and chained to his chair for a sizable portion of the trial.

Rubin, along with the six other defendants, was found not guilty on the charge of conspiracy but guilty (with four other defendants) on the charge of incitement. He was also sentenced by the judge to more than three years in prison for contempt of court. All of the convictions for incitement were later overturned by an appeals court, who cited judicial and prosecutorial misconduct. The contempt of court citations were also overturned on appeal. The contempt charges were re-tried in 1972 however the U.S. Justice Department declined to retry any of the defendants for either conspiracy or incitement.

The Vietnam War politicized marijuana, turning it from a sign of an immoral or corrupt person, suffering from amotivational syndrome (psychological condition associated with diminished inspiration to participate in social activities) into deliberate, calculated civil disobedience.

Jerry Rubin remarked in 1970:

Smoking pot makes you a criminal and a revolutionary. As soon as you take your first puff, you are an enemy of society.

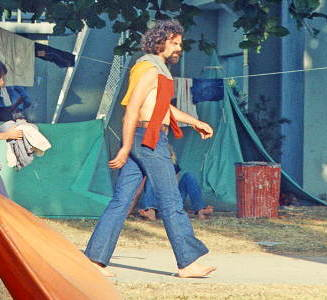
Rubin protesting during the 1972 Republican convention

In 1972, Rubin continued his activism, this time in Miami Beach to organize protests for both the Republican and Democratic Conventions. This time, the local community knew the Yippies were coming and they organized behind a Rubin of their own, Ellis Rubin, a well-known attorney. On June 4, 1972, the Rubins debated at the Unitarian Church in Miami, in front of 500 highly charged churchgoers on both sides of the issue, only divided by a church aisle. Jerry began the debate by thanking "Uncle Ellis" for the invitation to debate. Ellis, who was not related to Jerry, feigned disgust at the association and the event was "on". After barbs in both directions, it ended abruptly when Jerry famously dropped an "F-bomb" and Ellis took leave to lead the locals out in a protest of their own.

Rubin was also interviewed on television by journalist Dorothy Fuldheim about his book Do It. In the interview, Rubin started to quiz Fuldheim, asking her if she drank. He then referred to the police as "pigs," which offended Fuldheim, who replied, "I've got a shock for you. I'm very friendly with policemen." Rubin responded "Well, I've got a shock for you. I'm very friendly with the Black Panther Party." At this, Fuldheim threw her book and kicked Rubin off the set saying "Out! Stop the interview" as the cameras rolled.

== Post-activism ==
Rubin held a post-election party at his home in New York in January 1973, attended by John Lennon and Yoko Ono, after Democratic presidential candidate George McGovern had lost to Republican incumbent President Richard Nixon in the 1972 presidential election. Soon after, Rubin retired from politics entirely, becoming an entrepreneur and businessman.

In the 1980s, Rubin was now more known for being a Yuppie capitalist. Despite no longer maintaining the more radical counterculture views he once held and being regarded as a sellout by some of his former 1960s associates, it has been acknowledged that Rubin sought to use his business investments to promote social awareness. He embarked on a debating tour with Abbie Hoffman titled "Yippie versus Yuppie". Rubin's argument in the debates was that activism was hard work and that the abuse of drugs, sex, and private property had made the counterculture "a scary society in itself." He maintained that:

Wealth creation is the real American revolution. What we need is an infusion of capital into the depressed areas of our country.

— Jerry Rubin

A later political cartoon portrayed Rubin as half-guerrilla and half-businessman.

Rubin's differences with Hoffman were on principle rather than completely personal. However, it was acknowledged that his evolving views did not sit well with Hoffman. When Hoffman died by suicide in 1989, Rubin attended his funeral.

In his memoir Growing (Up) at Thirty-Seven Rubin emphasizes the importance of uniting the personal and the political. He writes:

Friends ask me, "Isn't your inward growth trip an escape from social reality?" Yes, it's a far cry from leading a march on the Pentagon to sitting cross-legged, counting my breaths. But there is no contradiction. We activists in the 1960s eventually lost touch with ourselves. Arica, est, bioenergetics, and other growth trips are to creating a centered individual who moves politically from a deep place. Dissatisfaction is not the only source for political action; people can be political from a personally satisfied place ... We have an opportunity to transform the planet, but first we need to free ourselves from the conditioning of the past and find our natural internal harmony; to lower our defenses and establish our common humanity.

== Other appearances ==
Jerry Rubin appeared posthumously in the 2002 British documentary by Adam Curtis, The Century of the Self. He appears in episode part 3 of 4. This segment of the documentary discusses the Erhard Seminars Training, also known as The est Training, of which Rubin was a graduate. In his autobiography Growing (Up) at Thirty-Seven Rubin dedicates a chapter on his experience of taking the est Training. He explains why est appealed to him, even though he had initially resisted it:

Something theatrically revolutionary was happening at est. In the 1960s we had used political guerrilla theater to get people to see beyond their roles. Now Werner was creating a psychological theater provoking people into self-confrontation. Whenever people discover themselves, they grow and learn − and that has to be revolutionary. (My act is liking something only if I can call it "revolutionary".)

Rubin also appeared on Saturday Night Live's second episode of its first season. He was announced as "Jerry Rubin, Leader of the Yippie Movement." The sketch is a fake commercial for wallpaper featuring famous protest slogans from the 1960s and 1970s (e.g., "Make Love, Not War", "Off the Pig!", "Give Peace a Chance", "Hell No, We Won't Go!", etc.). He ends the sketch by parodying a famous radical slogan as "Up against the wall-paper, posters!" (with the last word bleeped out in a reference to Up Against the Wall Motherfuckers).

== Author ==
Rubin's anti-establishment beliefs were put down in writing in his 1970 book, DO IT!: Scenarios of the Revolution, with an introduction by Black Panther Eldridge Cleaver and unconventional design by Quentin Fiore. In 1971, his journal, written while incarcerated in the Cook County Jail, was published under the title We are Everywhere. The book includes an inside view of the trial of the Chicago Seven, but otherwise focuses on the Weather Underground, the Black Panthers, LSD, women's liberation and his view of a coming revolution.

In 1976, Rubin wrote the book Growing (Up) at Thirty-Seven, which contained a chapter about his experience at an Erhard Seminars Training (EST) session, later included in the book American Spiritualities: A Reader (2001) edited by Catherine L. Albanese. In Growing (Up) at Thirty-Seven, Rubin claims a rational society cannot be built by people who are out of touch with themselves and can't even run their own lives rationally. Real political change will not happen unless people transform their own personal reality, and their own relationships. Much like Arthur Koestler in his collections of essays The Yogi and the Commissar, Rubin argues that political work and self-development has to go hand in hand. It was important, he said, that people lived the society they hoped to create.

As explained in Growing (Up) at Thirty-Seven Rubin experimented with many self-improvement techniques to overcome his own personal defects, everything from the est training, hypnotism, meditation and yoga to rolfing, acupuncture, the Arica School, Gestalt therapy and the bioenergetic analysis of Wilhelm Reich's pupil Alexander Lowen. In a review of the book Derek VanPelt comments on Rubin's self quest:

Rubin, though a crude writer, takes it all in from a fairly skeptical viewpoint and reports in entertaining, thoughtful, and sometimes funny prose. The depth and sincerity of his search is apparent, and his call for a cooperative relationship between new consciousness and new politics is one of the more promising prospects of the seventies.

In 1980, Rubin authored a self-help book with his wife, Mimi Leonard, entitled The War Between the Sheets: What's Happening with Men in Bed and What Men and Women Are Doing About It. It was not well received.

== Business ==
Sometime in the mid-1970s, Rubin reinvented himself as a businessman. Friend and fellow Yippie Stew Albert claimed Rubin's new ambition was giving capitalists a social consciousness. In 1980 he began a new career on Wall Street as stockbroker with the brokerage firm John Muir & Co. "I know that I can be more effective today wearing a suit and tie and working on Wall Street than I can be dancing outside the walls of power," he said.

In the 1980s, he became known for his promotion of business networking, having created Business Networking Salons, Inc., a company that organized parties at the Studio 54 and Palladium nightclubs in Manhattan, where thousands of young professionals and entrepreneurs met and shared ideas. Near the end of his life, Rubin became interested in the science of life extension and was heavily involved in multi-level marketing of health foods and nutritional supplements. "In 1991, he and his family moved to Los Angeles," according to an Observer.com profile of him, "where he became a successful independent marketer for a Dallas-based firm that sold a nutritional drink called Wow!, made with kelp, ginseng, and bee pollen. Ironically, Bobby Seale became one of his salesmen."

== Death ==
On November 14, 1994, Rubin was struck by a motorist as he attempted to cross Wilshire Boulevard, in front of his penthouse apartment in the Westwood area of Los Angeles, California. It was a Monday evening and weekday traffic was heavy, with three lanes moving in each direction. One motorist swerved to avoid Rubin, but a second driver, immediately behind the first, struck him. He was taken to the UCLA Medical Center, where he died of a heart attack two weeks later. He is interred in the Hillside Memorial Park Cemetery in Culver City, California.

State Senator Tom Hayden (D-Santa Monica), Rubin's fellow Chicago Seven member, said after the latter's death:

He was a great life force, full of spunk, courage and wit. I think his willingness to defy authority for constructive purposes will be missed. Up to the end, he was defying authority.

== In popular culture ==
- After Rubin's 1994 death, Weekend Update host Norm Macdonald quipped, "Yippie! Jerry Rubin died last week! Oh, I’m sorry, that should read, 'Yippie Jerry Rubin died last week.'"
- DO IT! was also the inspiration for a track of the same name on the 1972 Aphrodite's Child album 666.
- Barry Miller played Rubin in the 1987 film Conspiracy: The Trial of the Chicago 8.
- Mark Ruffalo voiced Rubin in the 2007 animated documentary Chicago 10.
- Danny Masterson portrays Jerry Rubin in the 2011 movie The Chicago 8, written and directed by Pinchas Perry. It was filmed in September and October 2009. The film is based closely on the trial transcripts and most of the action takes place in the courtroom.
- In the 2000 film about Abbie Hoffman, Steal This Movie, Rubin was portrayed by Kevin Corrigan.
- In the 2020 film The Trial of the Chicago 7, Rubin is played by Jeremy Strong.

== Bibliography ==
- Rubin, Jerry (1970). DO IT!: Scenarios of the Revolution. Simon & Schuster. ISBN 978-0671205355.
- Rubin, Jerry (1971). We Are Everywhere. Harper & Row. ISBN 978-0060137243.
- Rubin, Jerry (1976). Growing (Up) at Thirty-Seven. M. Evans & Company. ISBN 978-0871311894.
- Rubin, Jerry; Leonard, Mimi (1980). The War Between the Sheets: What's Happening with Men in Bed and What Men and Women Are Doing About It. Putnam. ISBN 978-0399900938.

== See also ==
- List of peace activists
