= Flower power =

Slogan of passive resistance and nonviolence

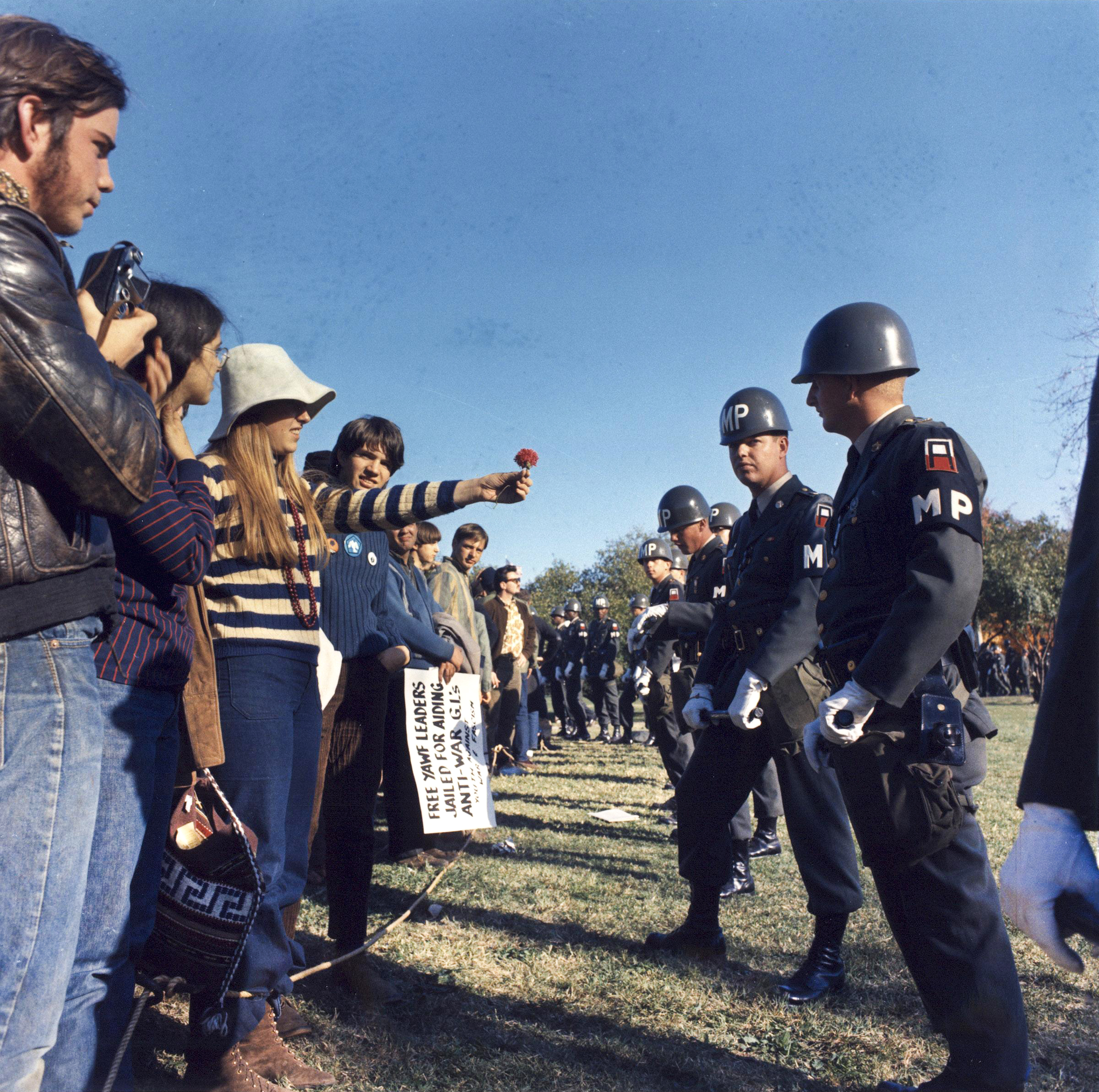
A demonstrator offers a flower to military police at an anti-Vietnam War protest at The Pentagon in Arlington, Virginia, October 21, 1967

Flower power was a political movement and slogan used during the late 1960s and early 1970s as a symbol of passive resistance and nonviolence. It is rooted in the anti-war movement which was opposed to U.S. involvement in the Vietnam War. The expression was coined by Beat poet Allen Ginsberg in 1965 as a means to transform war protests into peaceful affirmative spectacles. Hippies embraced the symbolism by dressing in clothing with embroidered flowers and vibrant colors, wearing flowers in their hair, and distributing flowers to the public, becoming known as flower children. The term later became generalized as a modern reference to the hippie movement and the so-called counterculture of drugs, psychedelic music, psychedelic art, and social permissiveness.

== Etymology ==
=== Origins ===
The term "Flower Power" originated in Berkeley, California, as a symbolic action of protest against the Vietnam War. In a November 1965 essay titled How to Make a March/Spectacle, Ginsberg, a poet, advocated for protesters to be provided with "masses of flowers" to hand out to policemen, press, politicians and spectators. The use of props like flowers, toys, flags, candy and music were meant to turn anti-war rallies into a form of street theater thereby reducing the fear, anger and threat that is inherent within protests. In particular, Ginsberg wanted to counter the "specter" of the Hells Angels motorcycle gang who supported the war, equated war protesters with communists and had threatened to violently disrupt planned anti-war demonstrations at the University of California, Berkeley. Using Ginsberg's methods, the protest received positive attention and the use of "flower power" became an integral symbol in the counterculture movement.

In 1965, Sky Saxon of Californian rock band the Seeds began to use the term "flower rock" to describe their music. Their manager DJ Lord Tim Hudson claimed to have coined the terms "flower power" and "flower child" encouraging the band to write songs such as "March of the Flower Children" for their album Future (1967). Hudson said, "Seed music is the original Flower Power music". Daryl Hooper, the Seeds keyboardist said,

When Sky actually wrote the lyric to that song it was about a girlfriend he was having trouble with. He initially called us 'flower rock music' 'cause the words are kind of flowery, and... the girls used to toss flowers at us on stage. So it became 'flower power'.

=== Definition ===
In December 1967, English journalist Peter Fryer published a glossary on hippie slang entitled "A to Z of Zowie," in the Sunday Observer, which defined flower power as "from Flower Children or Beautiful People. Revolutionary philosophy akin to ideas of Young Liberals, e.g. Make Love Not War. Characteristic: bell." According to writer Skip Stone's 1999 book Hippies from A to Z, "Flower Power was the hippie equivalent of the Black Power movement. An extension of the Peace and Love theme, Flower Power assumed that the power of Love would win out over violence and hate."

== Movement ==
"The cry of 'Flower Power' echoes through the land. We shall not wilt. Let a thousand flowers bloom."

— Abbie Hoffman, Workshop in Nonviolence, May 1967

By late 1966, the Flower Power method of guerilla theater had spread from California to other parts of the United States. The Bread and Puppet Theater in New York City staged numerous protests which included handing out balloons and flowers with their anti-war literature. Workshop in Nonviolence (WIN), a magazine published by New York activists, encouraged the use of Flower Power.

In May 1967, Abbie Hoffman organized the Flower Brigade as an official contingent of a New York City parade honoring the soldiers in Vietnam. News coverage captured Flower Brigade participants, who carried flowers, flags and pink posters imprinted with LOVE, being attacked and beaten by bystanders. In response to the violence, Hoffman wrote in WIN magazine, "Plans are being made to mine the East River with daffodils. Dandelion chains are being wrapped around induction centers... The cry of 'Flower Power' echoes through the land. We shall not wilt." On the next Sunday, WIN activists declared Armed Forces Day as "Flower Power Day" and held a rally in Central Park to counter the traditional parade. Turnout was low and, according to Hoffman, the rally was ineffective because guerilla theater needed to be more confrontational.

In October 1967, Hoffman and Jerry Rubin helped organize the March on the Pentagon using Flower Power concepts to create a theatrical spectacle. The plan included a call for marchers to attempt to "levitate" the Pentagon. When the marchers faced off against more than 2500 Army national guard troops forming a human barricade in front of the Pentagon, some demonstrators held out flowers and a few placed their flowers in the soldiers' rifle barrels.

External images
- The classic photo of a young woman with a flower facing-off against soldiers with fixed bayonets, by Marc Riboud
- Pulitzer Prize-nominated Flower Power photo by Bernie Boston.

Photographs of flower-wielding protesters at the Pentagon march became iconic images of 1960s anti-war protests. One photo called "The Ultimate Confrontation" (by French photojournalist Marc Riboud), showed Jan Rose Kasmir, a high school student of 17, clasping a chrysanthemum and gazing at bayonet-wielding soldiers. Smithsonian Magazine said the photo, which was published throughout the world, was "a gauzy juxtaposition of armed force and flower child innocence".

Another photo from the march, titled Flower Power (by Washington Star photographer Bernie Boston), was nominated for the 1967 Pulitzer Prize. The photo shows a young man in a turtleneck sweater placing carnations in the rifle barrels of military policemen. The young man in the photo is most commonly identified as George Edgerly Harris III, an 18-year-old actor from New York who later performed in San Francisco under the stage name of Hibiscus. According to writer and activist Paul Krassner, however, the young man was Yippie organizer "Super-Joel" Tornabene. Harris died in New York City in 1982 from HIV/AIDS, while Tornabene died in Mexico in 1993.

On 10 December 1971, John Lennon, an outspoken critic of the war, appeared at a rally for John Sinclair, a political activist and founding member of the White Panther Party, who had been sentenced to 10 years for marijuana possession. He said, "OK so Flower Power didn't work. So what. We start again."

By the early 1970s, the Flower Power anti-war movement had faded primarily due to the end of the military draft in 1972 and the start of American withdrawal from combat activities in Vietnam in January 1973.

== Cultural heritage ==
The iconic center of the Flower Power movement was the Haight-Ashbury district in San Francisco. By the mid-1960s, the area, marked by the intersection of Haight and Ashbury streets, had become a focal point for psychedelic rock music. Musicians and bands like Jefferson Airplane, the Grateful Dead and Janis Joplin all lived a short distance from the famous intersection. During the 1967 Summer of Love, thousands of hippies gathered there, popularized by hit songs such as "San Francisco (Be Sure to Wear Flowers in Your Hair)".

A July 7, 1967, Time cover story on "The Hippies: Philosophy of a Subculture", and an August CBS News television report on "The Hippie Temptation", as well as other major media exposure, brought the hippie subculture to national attention and popularized the Flower Power movement across the country and around the world. In the summer of 1967, the Beatles' hit single "All You Need Is Love" served as an anthem for the movement. On 25 June, the Beatles performed the song on the Our World international satellite broadcast, for an audience estimated at 400 million.

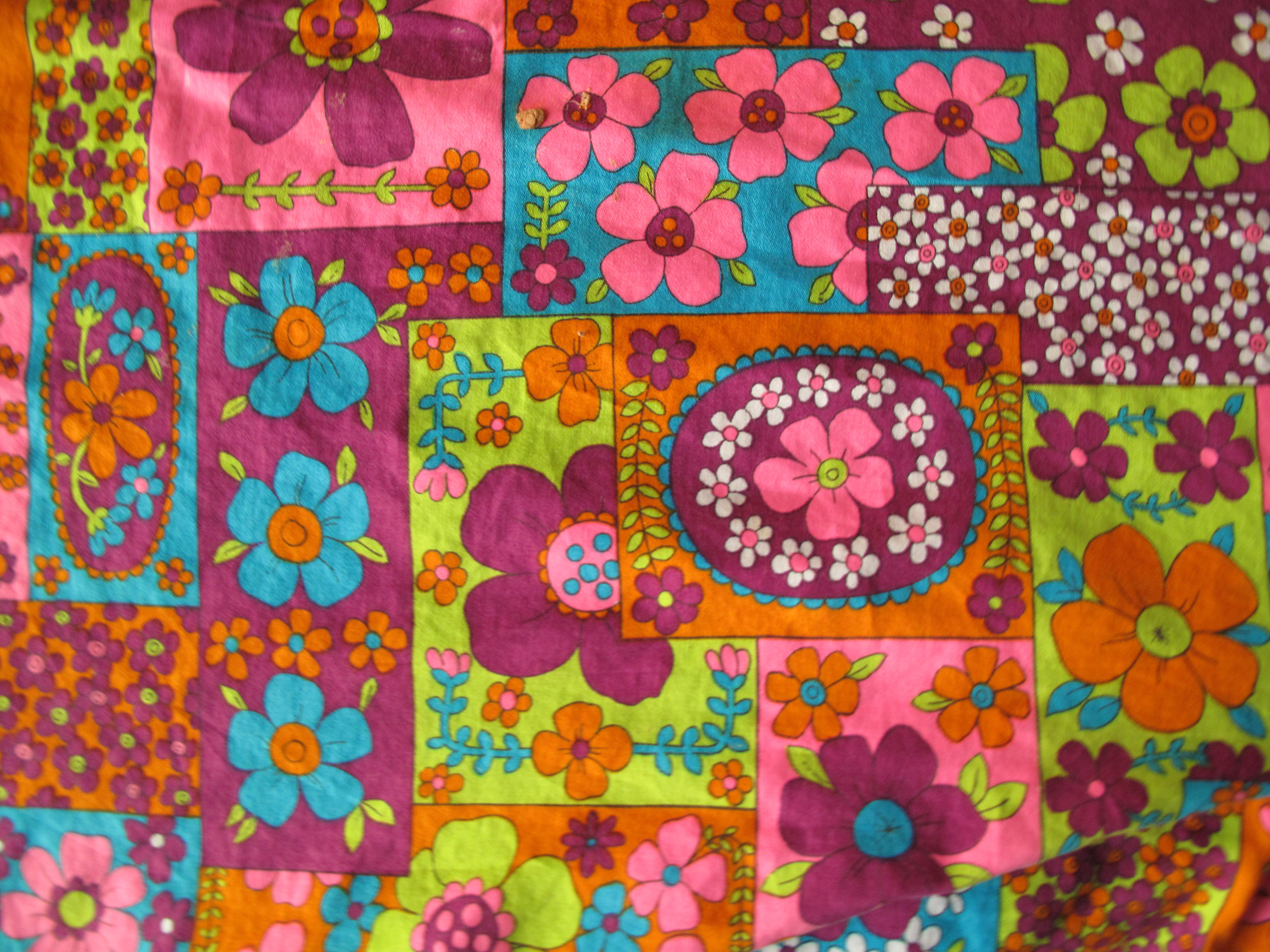
Cotton fabric, late 1960s, U.S.

The avant-garde art of Milton Glaser, Heinz Edelmann, and Peter Max became synonymous with the flower power generation. Edelman's illustration style was best known in his art designs for the Beatles' 1968 animated film Yellow Submarine. Glaser, the founder of Push Pin Studios, also developed the loose psychedelic graphic design, seen for example in his seminal 1966 poster illustration of Bob Dylan with paisley hair. It was the posters by pop artist Peter Max, with their vivid fluid designs painted in Day-Glo colors, which became visual icons of flower power. Max's cover story in Life (September 1969) as well as appearances on The Tonight Show Starring Johnny Carson and The Ed Sullivan Show, further established "flower power" style art into mainstream culture.

== See also ==
- Anti-war movement
- Guerrilla theatre
- Make love, not war
- Peace movement
