= Flower child =

1960s neologism associated with Hippies

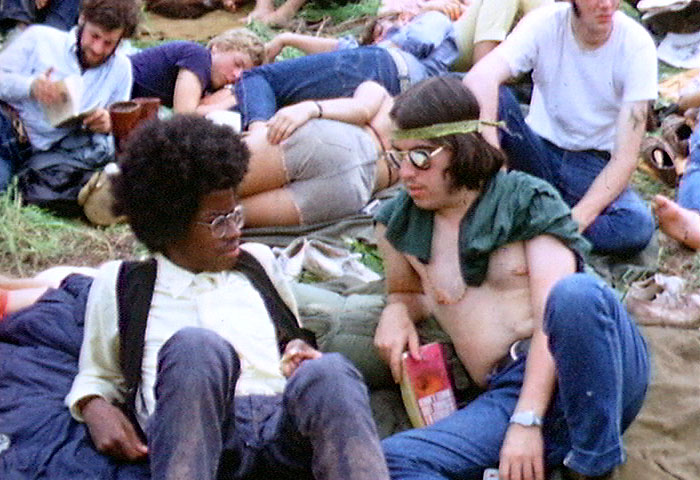
Two hippies at Woodstock

Flower child is a term coined in 1967 by the Californian disc jockey Lord Tim Hudson, who said, "Anyone aged between 15 and 30 is a flower child." The term was later adopted by Sky Saxon of the American rock band the Seeds who were managed by Hudson. He persuaded the band to write songs such as "March of the Flower Children" on their album Future (1967). The term "flower child" was then applied broadly to the hippie subculture by the mass media. It was the custom of "flower children" to wear and distribute flowers or floral-themed decorations to symbolize ideals of universal belonging, peace, and love. Flower children were also associated with the flower power political movement, which originated in ideas written by Allen Ginsberg in 1965.

== Etymology ==
According to Shindig! magazine, the term "flower child" was coined by Californian DJ Lord Tim Hudson in 1967. Hudson once stated "Anyone aged between 15 and 30 is a flower child". The term was later adopted by musician Sky Saxon of American rock band the Seeds who were managed by Hudson. He persuaded the band to write songs such as "March of the Flower Children" for their album Future (1967). At the time, Hudson claimed to have invented the term "flower power" as well and later stated, "Seed music is the original Flower Power music".

== History ==
In 1965, American Beat poet Allen Ginsberg advocated the giving of flowers as a means of peaceful protest. Images of flower-wielding protesters at the 1967 Pentagon March, such as Marc Riboud's image of Jan Rose Kasmir titled The Ultimate Confrontation: The Flower and the Bayonet and Bernie Boston's Pulitzer Prize–nominated photograph Flower Power, popularized the association of flowers with the counterculture movement of the 1960s. Hippies embraced the symbolism by dressing in clothing with embroidered flowers and vibrant colors, wearing flowers in their hair, and distributing flowers to the public, becoming known as flower children.

== San Francisco ==
John Phillips of The Mamas & the Papas wrote the song "San Francisco (Be Sure to Wear Flowers in Your Hair)" for his friend Scott McKenzie to promote the Monterey Pop Festival that Phillips was helping to organize. Released on May 13, 1967, the song's lyrics urged visitors to San Francisco to "wear some flowers in your hair", in keeping with the festival's billing as "three days of music, love, and flowers". The song was a popular hit, reaching number 4 on the music chart in the United States and number 1 in the United Kingdom and most of Europe, and became an unofficial anthem for hippies, flower power and the flower child concept.

== Summer of Love ==
After the January 14, 1967 Human Be-In organized by artist Michael Bowen (among other things, announcements told participants to bring flowers), as many as 100,000 young people from all over the world flocked to San Francisco's Haight-Ashbury district, Berkeley, and other Bay Area cities during the Summer of Love in search of different value systems and experiences. After the Monterey Pop Festival in June of 1967, the Summer of Love became a watershed event in the development of a worldwide 1960s counterculture when newly recruited flower children returned home at the end of the summer, taking with them new styles, ideas, and behaviors and introducing them in all major cities of the U.S. and western Europe.

== Social analysis ==
In his book, Prometheus Rising, the philosopher Robert Anton Wilson suggested that the flower children could be viewed in Jungian terms as a collective social symbol representing the mood of friendly weakness. In 1995, The Sekhmet Hypothesis extended Wilson's idea into other pop cultural trends with other youth movements being compared to the moods of hostile weakness, friendly strength and hostile strength.

== See also ==
- Baby boomers
- Carnation Revolution
- Counterculture of the 1960s
- Generation X
- Hippie
- History of the hippie movement
- Love beads
- Lorenzo St. DuBois

== Bibliography ==
- Hoskyns, Barney (6 June 1996). Waiting for the Sun: The Story of the Los Angeles Music Scene. Viking. ISBN 978-0670850211.
