= Hibiscus (entertainer) =

American actor, performance artist (1949–1982)

- Hibiscus as Madame Butterfly at Sonoma State University in 1970
- Born: George Edgerly Harris III; September 6, 1949; Bronxville, New York, U.S.
- Died: May 6, 1982 (aged 32); New York City, U.S.
- Occupations: Actor; performance artist

Hibiscus (born George Edgerly Harris III; September 6, 1949 – May 6, 1982) was an American actor and performance artist. He founded psychedelic gay liberation theater collectives The Cockettes in 1969 and The Angels of Light Free Theater in 1970.

He is widely believed to be the protester depicted in the iconic Flower Power (1967) photograph taken during an anti-Vietnam War protest in Washington, D.C., showing a demonstrator placing flowers into the gun barrels of military police.

== Early life ==
George Edgerly Harris III was born on September 6, 1949, in Bronxville, New York. His father, George Edgerly Harris II (1921–2005), was a World War II veteran and musician, and his mother, Anna Marie McCanless (1926–2016), was a songwriter. The family later moved to Clearwater Beach, Florida, where his parents performed with a local group known as the Little Theater. Harris and his siblings formed a children's troupe, the El Dorado Players.

In 1964, the family returned to New York. Harris appeared in television commercials and began acting professionally. In 1966, he performed in the Off-Broadway play Peace Creeps by John Wolfson, alongside Al Pacino and James Earl Jones.

In 1967, Harris and his father appeared in the Off-off-Broadway play Gorilla Queen by Ronald Tavel.

=== War protest photograph ===
On October 21, 1967, Harris participated in the March on the Pentagon. He is widely believed to appear in Bernie Boston's Pulitzer Prize–nominated photograph Flower Power, showing a protester inserting flowers into the barrels of soldiers' rifles. Boston later stated that the individual in the photograph was Harris. However, Paul Krassner identified the unnamed protester as Joel Tornabene in 1993—a member of the Youth International Party known to Krassner as "Super-Joel".

== Career ==
=== The Cockettes (1969–70) ===
After relocating to San Francisco, Hibiscus became a central figure in the countercultural performance scene. His distinctive style—featuring a full beard, vintage dresses, makeup, and costume jewelry—attracted a group of collaborators with shared interests in musical theater, improvisation, and psychedelic culture. In 1969, he founded The Cockettes, who staged midnight musical revues at the Palace Theater in North Beach, San Francisco. Their productions parodied and reimagined classic Hollywood films and musicals, including Gone with the Showboat to Oklahoma, Hollywood Babylon, and Pearls over Shanghai. The performances became popular within San Francisco's gay community. Notable former members included disco singer Sylvester and drag queen Divine.

As the group grew more structured and began charging admission, tensions developed. Hibiscus advocated for free performances and resisted increased rehearsal and scripting. Conflicts over artistic direction contributed to his departure from the group in 1970.

=== The Angels of Light (1970–1982) ===
In 1970, Hibiscus and several collaborators founded the Angels of Light Free Theater. The troupe staged "cosmic theater" revues in San Francisco and New York, often performing in public parks, community centers, and other public venues in order to avoid charging admission. Allen Ginsberg and other Beat Generation artists participated in some performances.

After returning to New York, Hibiscus produced Off-off-Broadway drag revues under the Angels of Light name. One production, Sky High, featured members of the Harris family and received the most attention from the gay press. He was also a member of the glam-rock parody group Hibiscus and the Screaming Violets.

Throughout his career, Hibiscus appeared as a background performer on daytime television soap operas and local television productions. When he received on-screen credit, it was almost exclusively as George E. Harris or George Harris III.

== Death and aftermath ==
Hibiscus died in New York City on May 6, 1982, from pneumonia caused by complications of AIDS. At the time, the disease was known as GRID and was heavily stigmatized.

In 1987, a panel bearing his name was donated to the AIDS Memorial Quilt. Hibiscus' name was frequently read during AIDS memorial readings and activism events, including the Stop the Church protest in 1989.

The 2002 documentary The Cockettes examines his life and influence. His scrapbooks, correspondence, costumes, and short films are preserved in several collections, including materials held at the University of California. Family-held materials related to the Angels of Light are also featured in the documentary. The Harris family have published two books related to Hibiscus, a biography of titled Flower Power Man (2017), written by his sisters, and Caravan to Oz (2014), a profile of the family's Off-off-Broadway career.
