= Albert Hanson =

Albert Hanson may refer to:

- Albert Hanson (academic) (1913–1971), professor of politics at the University of Leeds
- Albert J. Hanson (1867–1914), Australian artist

== See also ==
- Albert Hansen (1871–1943), American football player, coach, and politician
- Albert Hansson (born 2004), Swedish golfer
