= Janet Douglas (historian) =

English historian (1943–2024)

Janet Douglas (February 1943 – 4 November 2024) was an English historian and academic whose later work focused on the city of Leeds in the modern period, particularly art history and architecture. She was Principal Lecturer of Politics and Social History at Leeds Polytechnic, later Leeds Metropolitan University and now Leeds Beckett University. She was active in local Leeds societies, including the West Yorkshire Group of The Victorian Society, the Ford-Maguire Society, the Thoresby Society, the Leeds Philosophical and Literary Society and regularly gave lectures and guided walks on a wide range of subjects. Douglas died on 4 November 2024, at the age of 81.

== Selected publications ==
- India's Democracy (with Albert Hanson (academic)) (1972)
- Leeds. 1, The Bank, Yorkshire Archaeological Society (with Ken Powell) (c1981)
- Cookridge Street, Gt. George Street & planning platitudes, Victorian Society West Yorkshire Group (with Ken Powell) (1982)
- Leeds: Three Suburban Walks (with Ken Powell and Chris Hammond) (1987)
- Leeds : three architectural walks, The Victorian Society (with Ken Powell) (1988).
- St John's Church Leeds : a history (with Ken Powell) (1985/1993)
- Leeds places of worship trail, Leeds Civic Trust (1996)
- Leeds and the Public Patronage of Fine Art Act, 1809-1888, Publications of the Thoresby Society, 2nd series 11 (2001)
- Leeds (with Susan Wrathmell and John Minnis et al). Pevsner architectural guides. New Haven, Conn.: Yale University Press. (2005).
- Prince Alamayu (c2007)
- Sir Edward Baines (c2007)
- Lucy Beckett (c2007)
- Thomas Harding (c2007)
- John Hope Shaw (c2008)
- Blanche Legat Leigh (c2008)
- Elinor Lupton (c2008)
- Joseph Pickersgill (c2008)
- Lilian Stiles-Allen (c2008)
- Frank Meadow Sutcliffe (c2008)
- A lasting moment : Marc Riboud photographs Leeds 1954 and 2004 (with Marc Riboud, Anna Douglas, Caryl Phillips (2008)
- Cranes over the City: The Centre of Leeds, 1980–2008 in Sport, Leisure and Culture in the Postmodern City edited by Stephen Wagg and Peter Bramham (Routledge, 2009)
- Bibliography of the History of Leeds (with Jim Morgan) (2011)
- 'The Architectural Profession in Leeds (1850–1914)', 'Chorley and Connon, and their Partners', 'Thomas Ambler (1838–1920)' and 'Percy Robinson (1869–1950)' in Christopher Webster (ed.) Building a Great Victorian City: Leeds Architects and Architecture 1790-1914 (2011).
- 'York Road Library, Leeds' in Yorkshire’s Historic Landscapes and Buildings at Risk edited by George Sheeran and Veronica Wallace (2011)
- A Cherished Friendship: Julia Griffiths Crofts and Frederick Douglass Slavery & Abolition, 33(2), 265–274 (2012)
- Emily Ford: The forgotten sister of the woman who brought Kropotkin the anarchist to Leeds' poshest suburb, The Guardian, 15 January 2013.
- British Labour and the Russian Revolution: The Leeds Convention of 1917 (co-edited with Christian Hogsbjerg with Ken Coates's original introduction) about the Council of Workers' and Soldiers' Delegates in 1917 (2017)
- Charles B Howdill (2018)
- Leeds Zoological and Botanical Gardens (2018).
- ‘Women, Reading, and the Leeds Library’, in Ruth Robbins and Christopher Webster (eds) Through the Pages: 250 years of The Leeds Library, Leeds: The Leeds Library (2018), pp. 105-121.
- 'Zionism in Leeds 1892-1939' in Leeds and its Jewish Community (edited by Derek Fraser) (2019)
- 'Remembering the battle of Holbeck Moor, 1936' in Publications of the Thoresby Society, 2nd series, vol. 33 (2023).
