= The Ultimate Confrontation =

Photograph by Marc Riboud

The iconic image of Kasmir, October 21, 1967

The Ultimate Confrontation: The Flower and the Bayonet is a photograph of Jan Rose Kasmir (born in 1950), at that time an American high-school student. This iconic photograph was taken by French photographer Marc Riboud. Riboud photographed Kasmir on October 21, 1967 while taking part with over 100,000 anti-war activists in the National Mobilization Committee to End the War in Vietnam's March on the Pentagon to protest U.S. involvement in Vietnam. Seventeen-year-old Kasmir was shown clasping a chrysanthemum and gazing at bayonet-wielding soldiers. The photo was featured in the December 30, 1969 special edition of Look magazine under the title The Ultimate Confrontation: The Flower and the Bayonet. The photo was republished world-wide and became a symbol of the flower power movement. Smithsonian magazine later called it "a gauzy juxtaposition of armed force and flower child innocence".

Kasmir graduated in 1986 from the New York College of Health Professions in Manhasset, New York as a massage therapist, and worked in Hilton Head Island, South Carolina until 1991. She then moved to Aarhus, Denmark, with her Danish husband and their daughter. She returned with her daughter to the United States in 2002, and resumed living on Hilton Head Island, South Carolina.

In February 2003, Riboud again photographed Kasmir protesting against the Iraq War where she carried a poster-size copy of the 1967 photograph.

In 2010, Kasmir was invited by the Spanish organization Avalon Project Peace NGO to speak during activities for International Peace Day in Seville, Spain.

In January 2017, she joined the Women's March in Washington, D.C.

== See also ==
- Flower Power, a similar photograph taken by Bernie Boston the same day
