= Miami and the Siege of Chicago =

Non-fiction novel by Norman Mailer

- Author: Norman Mailer
- Language: English
- Genre: Novel
- Publisher: World Publishing Co.
- Publication date: 1968
- Publication place: United States
- Media type: Print Hardback
- Preceded by: Armies of the Night
- Followed by: Of a Fire on the Moon

Miami and the Siege of Chicago: An Informal History of the Republican and Democratic Conventions of 1968 is a non-fiction novel written by Norman Mailer which covers the Republican and Democratic national party political conventions of 1968 and the anti-Vietnam War protests surrounding them. It was published in 1968 by the World Publishing Company.

== Background ==
Writer and cultural critic Norman Mailer wrote much of Miami and the Siege of Chicago in between early film shoots for his motion picture Maidstone (1970).

On assignment from Harper's magazine, Mailer arrived in Miami, Florida to cover the Republican Party's 1968 convention, August 3–9, including its candidates, along with their political entourages. Presidential contender Richard Nixon arrived via helicopter and was greeted by dancers, a marching band and a small elephant. The following day, his rival, Nelson Rockefeller, arrived and held a street rally along the beach in order to officially launch his own convention bid to be the GOP standard-bearer.

Afterwards, Mailer went to report on the Democratic Convention, in Chicago, Illinois, August 24–29.

== Miami (Republican) "Nixon in Miami" ==
Mailer the "Reporter" slid his way into the Republican Convention's gala one night, taking the appearance of one of Ronald Reagan's security guards. While there, he noticed Nixon's usual supporters, along with the Nixonnettes and an all-Black band to entertain the guests. Mailer pinpointed many observations of the Republican people, alluding to their high-strung physical appearance as though their lives depended on being present. He even pointed out the young, writing, "Even a large part of the young seemed to have faces whose cheeks had been injected with Novacain." With the nominating process going Nixon's way, Mailer shifted gears to Rockefeller's camp and how the majority of his affairs with delegate voters and nominations were by financial means. Mailer noted that Nixon was not fazed by Rockefeller's approach, and observed "Nelson Rockefeller is out of his mind if he thinks he can take the nomination away from Richard Nixon" - which he also deemed the first certitude the convention had given him.

It was obvious that a "popular vote" would go Rockefeller's way, yet Nixon had several issues, none more pressing than with the press/media; Nixon had scheduled a press conference for 8:30 am. Mailer contributes that by the timing, Nixon hoped his "worst enemies" would still be asleep and that would contribute to the press conference being more troublesome. On the speech day for the Republican candidates, Mailer alluded to Nixon's similarities to Dr. Martin Luther King Jr.'s "I have a dream speech" (with Nixon switching it to "I see a day"). Mailer compared Nixon's appeal to the other races and them being just as American as anyone else to "YMCA Secretary". Nixon's approach to make his speech more listener-friendly did not go over Mailer's had as he hinted at the subtle "Piece of the Action" to bridge the gaps of stand-up suit and tie and rural-area farmer or Black person. Nixon concluded his speech with a few jabs at the administration that led America into the Vietnam War. Mailer noted that a riot was going on 6 miles (9.7 km) away from the convention, and that some blacks were killed and critically injured, but over 150 were arrested. He felt no need to cover the incident because he said there would likely be more of the same in Chicago. Ending the section, he alludes to his back-and-forth struggle between the "Bad Racist" and the "Racist who might conceivably be not all Bad" (alluding to Hubert Humphrey vs. Richard Nixon). He noted he left without many answers and hoped Chicago would provide him with some.

== Chicago (Democratic) "The Siege of Chicago" ==
The "Reporter" was familiar with McCarthy, for he had had previous encounters with him and had been impressed by McCarthy's speaking skills at the Los Angeles Democratic Convention back in 1960. Mailer observed that McCarthy "held the crowd like matador... gathering their emotion, discharging it, creating new emotion on the wave of the last, driving his passes tighter and tighter as he readied for the kill." The movements of Hippies and Yippies were prominent in the Democratic Convention: On one Sunday afternoon the yippies handed out flyers that signified immediate change if Mailer "Pig was voted in" voting would warrant change like the immediate end to the way in Vietnam, Legalization of Marijuana, and the freeing of Huey Newton and the other black panther party members who have been arrested due to protest.

"The Reporter" starts his days off in Chicago by paying homage to the beauty of the city not so much for its actually physical beauty but the place hit close to home because it reminded him of his hometown of Brooklyn New York“The Mafia loved Humphrey.” While the doves and left wing of the party were confined to the rear bleachers, Daley was down front, holding the floor for the preordained nominee, along with a crew of “hecklers, fixers, flunkies and musclemen. . . . guys with eyes like drills.” were Mailer's word for what he saw in the mist of craziness and disarray from the protest that were ensuing during the Democratic convention, yet Hubert Humphrey remained in an unwavering state for which he knew he had protection but he also knew he had control. Yet despite Humphrey's supposed control Mailer also deemed the gathering “the wildest Democratic convention in decades.” Mailer ends the section still not swayed by either candidate and said he probably wouldn't vote unless it was for the writer Eldridge Cleaver

== Style ==
C. Natalie Peditto noted in her review of Miami and the Siege of Chicago that, while in some sections of the book "Mailer indulges in rampant hyperbole...his version of events is much more factual when he’s reporting on what transpires on the convention floor and in the delegate caucuses, or when describing the great assembly of anti-war demonstrators in the parks and on the streets of Chicago, which at one point he joins as a speaker."

Miami and the Siege of Chicago signals a shift of sorts in Mailer's often highly metaphorical writing style. The book highlights the ability of the author to use his gift for language in more subtle, accessible ways. Mailer's tone also appears to be calmer and less stridently provocative, coinciding with his arrival at middle age. This Mailer identifies less with the iconoclastic rebels and hipster protagonists featured so prominently in his earlier works and more with the purportedly conservative values of older, more establishment types such as Nixon. At this point in his career, Mailer is no longer the young enfant terrible or firebrand – he has transformed onto the increasingly conservative father-figure, an award-winning author with a lot to think about and a lot to lose. His writing in Miami and the Siege of Chicago reflects this stylistic shift.

== Analysis ==
Miami and the Siege of Chicago would prove to be one of Mailer's most significant contributions to the mid-20th century writing movement known as New Journalism, which award-winning, latter-day essayist and critic Frank Rich has described to include "...nonfiction 'novels' that upended the staid conventions of newspaper and magazine writing by injecting strong subjective voices, self-reflection, opinion, and, most of all, good writing that animated current events and the characters who populated them."

Rich praises the book for capturing the zeitgeist of 1960's America, a period about which Mailer wrote, "...It was as if the historical temperature in America went up every month.” This was especially true in 1968, the year in which President Lyndon Johnson shocked many with his decision not to seek re-election; King and Robert F. Kennedy were assassinated; and multiple American cities and campuses erupted in violent protests - "events ... just too explosive to be contained by the tidy columns of a newspaper’s front page."

Mailer is also hailed for how well Miami and the Siege of Chicago has held up to many subsequent assessments, due to his visceral writing sense, but also because of the book's prescience: Mailer correctly gauges the perceived improvements in Nixon's presentation and strategy in the years since the brooding Californian had been vanquished in multiple unsuccessful bids for public office. The author nails the inevitability of Humphrey's coronation by the Democrats - and the dubiousness of that decision. Mailer sharply makes note of Ronald Reagan as a comer to watch as the inheritor of the Barry Goldwater acolytes; recognizes the rise and increasing influence of an angry contingent of southern whites who flee the Democrats for Strom Thurmond's Dixiecrat bid who will ultimately be Republicans; and predicts political conventions will soon become little more than staged television shows.

Mailer's foresight is also applied by many critics to the American electorate decades later. Assessing Miami and the Siege of Chicago anew in honor of its 50th anniversary, award-winning critic David Denby, writing for The New Yorker magazine, brings attention to Mailer predicting the volatility of white voters' anger and resentment against African-Americans in response to debates over white guilt, when the author ominously foretells, "...political power of the most frightening sort [to be] obviously waiting for the first demagogue who would smash the obsession and free the white man of his guilt..." Mailer recognized and dryly tells McCarthy's daughter that "we will be fighting for forty years."

Despite his admiration for Cleaver, the book also reveals a layer of anger and resentment from Mailer in his complicated and evolving views on African-Americans. Anger he feels while enduring the extreme tardiness of civil rights leader Ralph Abernathy allows some of Mailer's previously suppressed resentments about Blacks to flow to the front of his mind. Though he acknowledges some of the history of violence and enslavement foisted upon African-Americans for centuries, and supports the civil rights movement, Mailer laments the behavior, style and habits of some Blacks, reveals doubts about the ultimate effects of race riots in major cities and expresses that Blacks should collectively do a better job of policing the unproductive members of their own community. This is no longer the Mailer of The White Negro - who had romanticized what he then perceived to be the strident iconoclasm and resistance of African-American men to the white society that had dehumanized them.

Still, he does take the care to recognize that, at the Democratic convention, Channing Phillips of Washington, D.C. – who would have served as a Kennedy delegate, had Kennedy not been assassinated —became the first black politician to be nominated for president at a major party convention.

== Reception ==
Critic Peter Shaw lauded Miami and the Siege of Chicago for the immediacy of its style. He praised the writing that Mailer produced under deadline and in real-time using a journalist's perspective. Shaw argued that this more instinctive, urgent form of writing brought out some of Mailer's best tendencies as a communicator. On topics and works for which Mailer had already pre-formed strong opinions or perspectives, Shaw often found the author heavy-handed and tedious – a polemicist.

The spontaneity engendered by documenting unfolding events at the conventions, however, encouraged Mailer to express his gifts in ways that Shaw found to be open, imaginative and instinctive. Without unlimited time to ruminate on all of the issues and the scenes parading before him, or firmly set all his opinions of each character in advance, Mailer's writing was purer - the fresh initial takes and impressions of a gifted novelist, rather than the ponderous admonitions of a town crier. Shaw even favorably compares Mailer's work in Miami and the Siege of Chicago to that of other prominent author-journalists, including Stephen Crane and Ernest Hemingway.

Denby concurred: "...Mailer’s writing reached heights of complication that the others didn’t try for. As an observer attentive to everything, he was hit from moment to moment with new perceptions, which changed his consciousness as an observer, forcing him to make still fresh observations and new distinctions—a positive feedback loop whose results were closer to Faulkner and Joyce and Whitman than to journalism of any kind. The writing was literally inimitable."

== See also ==
- Chicago Seven
- 1968 Democratic National Convention protest activity
- Youth International Party (Yippies)
- National Mobilization Committee to End the War in Vietnam
- Protests of 1968
