= Harris entertainment family =

American family of entertainers and pioneers of Off-off-Broadway theater

The Harris Family is an American family of entertainers. Their careers, collectively and individually, encompass theater, music, film, broadcast media and performance art. They are best known as pioneers of experimental Off-off-Broadway theater in New York City, San Francisco and Europe from the mid-1960s through the early 1980s.

== Early life ==
Following his Army Air Corps service in World War II, George Edgerly Harris Jr. of Margaretville, New York, married Ann Marie McCanless of Bronxville, New York, on June 21, 1948. They settled in Bronxville, the Westchester County suburb where Ann had been raised. Their first six children were born there: George E. Harris III, Walter Michael Harris, Ann Marie Harris, Frederic Joseph Harris, Jayne Anne Harris and John Joseph Harris. Of these six, Ann Marie died at three months and John Joseph shortly after birth. In 1958 the Harrises relocated to Clearwater, Florida, where their two youngest, Eloise Alice Harris and Mary Lucile Harris, were born.

In 1959-1960 George and Ann became interested in theater and began acting with the local Francis Wilson Playhouse. Soon all six children were performing in the Playhouse's Junior Workshop. In 1961 Ann and her son George III converted the family's garage into a theater and founded The El Dorado Players, an acting company named for the street they lived on, composed of the Harris children and their neighborhood friends. The Players' first two offerings, Bluebeard and The Sheep and the Cheapskate, were short musicals written by Ann Harris during her college years. Subsequent shows were adapted from a Burton-Taylor film (Cleopatra, the Nile Queen) and from a Broadway musical record album (Camelot). The Players made a film, The Unsinkable Titanic, inspired by Walter Lord's 1955 book A Night To Remember, and the 1958 film of the same name. George III wrote the screenplay and directed, and Ann played "The Unsinkable Molly Brown." Their efforts were rewarded with a sold-out premiere screening and a positive review in The Clearwater Sun newspaper. Encouraged by their successes, the family sensed an opportunity and decided to move to New York City to seek careers in theater.

== Career ==
=== Off-off-Broadway ===
George Sr. moved to New York City in the summer of 1962 as an advance scout for his family. He soon met Ellen Stewart, founder of La MaMa Experimental Theater Club (ETC), a pioneering producer of experimental theater. By December he was acting and directing for La MaMa, which led to work at the two other flagship theaters of the underground, the Caffe Cino and Judson Poets Theater. The following year George felt sure-footed enough to send for Ann and their six children. Stewart found them an apartment and recommended them to her fellow producers. All eight Harrises were enthusiastically embraced by the playwrights, directors and producers of Off-off-Broadway. Dubbed "The Lunts of Off-off-Broadway" by Cino playwright Robert Patrick, the Harrises found work constantly and quickly established themselves as resourceful performers who could act, sing, dance, write and direct. Jayne Anne (aka Jane) made her New York debut as Christopher Robin in the 1964 Judson Poets Theater musical Sing Ho! For A Bear. George Sr. played multiple roles in the July 1965 premiere of Lanford Wilson's This Is The Rill Speaking at the Caffe Cino, directed by the playwright. In September 1965 Walter Michael made his New York debut at La MaMa ETC as Kenny in the premiere of Wilson's The Sandcastle, directed by Marshall W. Mason, followed by Young Albert in Paul Foster's The Madonna In The Orchard with Harvey Keitel, and in 1966 as Tobias in Tom Eyen's Miss Nefertiti Regrets, playing drums and singing opposite nineteen year-old Bette Midler. Also in 1966 George Sr. and Ann acted in the 1966 premiere of Lanford Wilson's The Rimers of Eldritch at La MaMa, directed by the playwright. Later that year Stewart invited George III, then fourteen, to re-establish his El Dorado Players in residence at La MaMa ETC as her "Young Playwrights Series." The reconstituted Players reprised their Florida successes, Bluebeard and The Sheep and the Cheapskate, followed by two new original musicals featuring songs by Ann. The first, MacBee, was adapted from Shakespeare's Macbeth. There Is Method In Their Madness followed, based on the Harris children's experiences with acting school. As in Florida, the press took notice. At year's end Walter Michael wrote and performed the music for Tom Eyen's Give My Regards to Off-off-Broadway to celebrate La MaMa's re-opening following a period of closure by the city.

In 1967 George III acted in Jeff Weiss' play A Funny Walk Home at the Caffe Cino. When the Cino closed in 1968 following Joe Cino's suicide, playwright Robert Patrick took up residence at the Old Reliable Theater Tavern on East Fourth Street. He invited Walter Michael there to supervise the music for his Easter play, Joyce Dynel.

=== Professional success ===
By the mid 1960s family members were cast in Broadway and Off-Broadway shows including The Porcelain Year (George III, 1965, with Barbara bel Geddes, Kim Darby and Martin Balsam), Gorilla Queen (Georges Sr. and III, 1966), Hair (Walter, 1968, with Diane Keaton and Melba Moore), The Great White Hope (George Sr., 1968, with James Earl Jones and Jane Alexander) and Invitation To A Beheading (Eloise, 1969, with John Heffernan). They signed with agents, joined the various unions for actors and entertainers, and by 1970 were full-fledged professionals.

Movie roles include Ann as Doris Acker in The Honeymoon Killers (1970) and George, Sr. as Patrolman Mooney in Superman (1978). Mary Lou as "College Student" was chased by a Muppet named Animal in the 1984 Jim Henson film The Muppets Take Manhattan. Between professional acting and "day jobs," family members remained active "downtown" with La MaMa ETC, Theater for the Lost Continent and Theater for the New City.

== Members ==
=== Hibiscus ===
In late 1967 George III followed the youth counterculture movement to San Francisco. On the way he joined the October 21, 1967, anti-war march on the Pentagon and became the subject of Flower Power, photojournalist Bernie Boston's historic photograph of that event. In San Francisco he moved into beat poet Irving Rosenthal's Kaliflower commune, changed his name to Hibiscus and founded The Cockettes and Angels of Light theater troupes. In 1972 he returned to New York City with his partner and collaborator Angel Jack Coe, reunited with his family and recruited them for a new Angels of Light company there. In the mid-70s the New York Angels of Light, under Hibiscus' leadership, became artists-in-residence at Theater for the New City in downtown Manhattan. They toured Europe twice, sponsored by National Artist of the Netherlands Ritsaert ten Cate, founder of Amsterdam's Mickery Theater and DasArts. The Angels earned recognition at the international Festival Mondial du Théâtre in Nancy, France. Notices in the European press were generally positive and most ran with photos, including one with then-campaigning presidential candidate François Mitterrand.

In the late 70s the Angels disbanded and the Harris family regrouped in New York City to present an Off-Broadway revue called Sky High. In 1980 George III (Hibiscus) formed a musical art-rock club act with his sisters and his brother Fred called "Hibiscus and the Screaming Violets" while simultaneously writing, producing and starring in a new musical, Tinsel Town Tirade, featuring Andy Warhol star Holly Woodlawn. On May 6, 1982, Hibiscus died from complications of AIDS, early in the epidemic. His legacy and influence in theater and gay liberation are well documented.

=== Harris sisters ===
Following the Off-off-Broadway years and performing with Hibiscus' Angels of Light in New York City and Europe, the three Harris sisters formed a rock band, The Harris Sisters and Trouble in New York City. They played the downtown club scene including CBGB's, Great Gildersleeves and The Bitter End before teaming up with their brothers George (Hibiscus) and Fred to form the glitter-rock group "Hibiscus and the Screaming Violets." Following Hibiscus' unexpected death in 1982 the sisters rallied and formed The Harris Sisters harmony trio and became prolific cabaret performers in New York City. The Harris Sisters also performed on the talk show Geraldo, in service of the homeless through VETCO (Vietnam Veterans Ensemble Theater Company).

In the 1980s the Harris sisters created a successful business, Coat Check Inc., to provide high-end event services (coat checking, waiter staff) to clients including The Metropolitan Costume Ball and Victoria's Secret. Their employees were actors and entertainers who needed flexible shifts to accommodate their unpredictable audition and performance schedules. In the late 1980s the sisters teamed up with Broadway composer Richard Adler (The Pajama Game, Damn Yankees) to record an album titled The Harris Sisters Sing Richard Adler. In 1992, the sisters performed in Hibiscus, a musical about their late brother George, presented by Ellen Stewart at La MaMa ETC. The following year the Harris sisters co-wrote, produced and performed in the "backstage" musical Cheek to Cheek which also premiered at La MaMa ETC.

== Memoirs ==
The Harris family published two memoirs documenting their lives and careers: Caravan to Oz (2014), a memoir of the family's artistic and personal journey as a family; and Flower Power Man, a biography of the late Hibiscus (George Harris III). Both books include essays and photos contributed by family friends and colleagues.
