= The Armies of the Night =

1968 nonfiction novel by Norman Mailer

The Armies of the Night: History as a Novel/The Novel as History
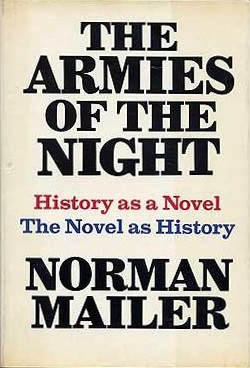
- First edition cover
- Author: Norman Mailer
- Language: English
- Publisher: New American Library
- Publication date: 1968
- Publication place: United States

The Armies of the Night: History as a Novel/The Novel as History is a nonfiction novel recounting the October 1967 March on the Pentagon written by Norman Mailer and published by New American Library in 1968. It won the Pulitzer Prize for General Nonfiction and the National Book Award in category Arts and Letters. Mailer's unique rendition of the nonfiction novel was perhaps his most successful example of new journalism, and received the most critical attention. The book originated as an essay published in Harper's Magazine titled "The Steps of the Pentagon," at the time the longest magazine article ever published, surpassing John Hersey's "Hiroshima" in The New Yorker.

== Background ==
Armies of the Night deals with the March on the Pentagon (the October 1967 anti-Vietnam War rally in Washington, D.C.) The book emerged on the heels of two works—An American Dream and Why Are We in Vietnam?—whose mixed receptions had disappointed Mailer. In fact, he was partly motivated to attend and chronicle the march for pragmatic reasons: the money. While Mailer dips into familiar territory, his fiction—self-portrait—the outlandish, third person account of himself along with self-descriptions such as a novelist/historian, anti-star/hero are made far more complex by the narrative's overall generic identification as a nonfiction novel.

Two years before Armies was published, In Cold Blood by Truman Capote, who had just been called by George Plimpton (among others) the "inventor" of the nonfiction novel, argued that the genre should exclude any mention of its subjectivity and refrain from the first person. While to some extent satirizing Capote's model, Mailer's role in center stage is hardly self-glamorizing, as the narrative recounts the events leading up to the March as well as his subsequent arrest and night in jail. The first section, "History as a Novel", begins: "From the outset, let us bring you news of your protagonist", with an account made by Time: "Washington's scruffy Ambassador Theater, normally a pad for psychedelic frolics, was the scene of an unscheduled scatological solo last week in support of the peace demonstrations. Its anti-star was author Norman Mailer, who proved even less prepared to explain Why Are We In Vietnam? than his current novel bearing that title." After citing the entire article, Mailer then closes, "1: Pen Pals" with "Now we may leave Time in order to find out what happened." What creates the difference between Mailer's example and Capote's is not only the autobiography of Armies, but the irony which guides the narrator towards the same objective of empiricism as that of In Cold Blood. The non-conformity which Mailer exhibits to Capote's criterion was the beginning of a feud that never resolved between the authors, and was ended with Capote's death in 1984.

== Summary ==
=== History as a Novel: The Steps of the Pentagon ===
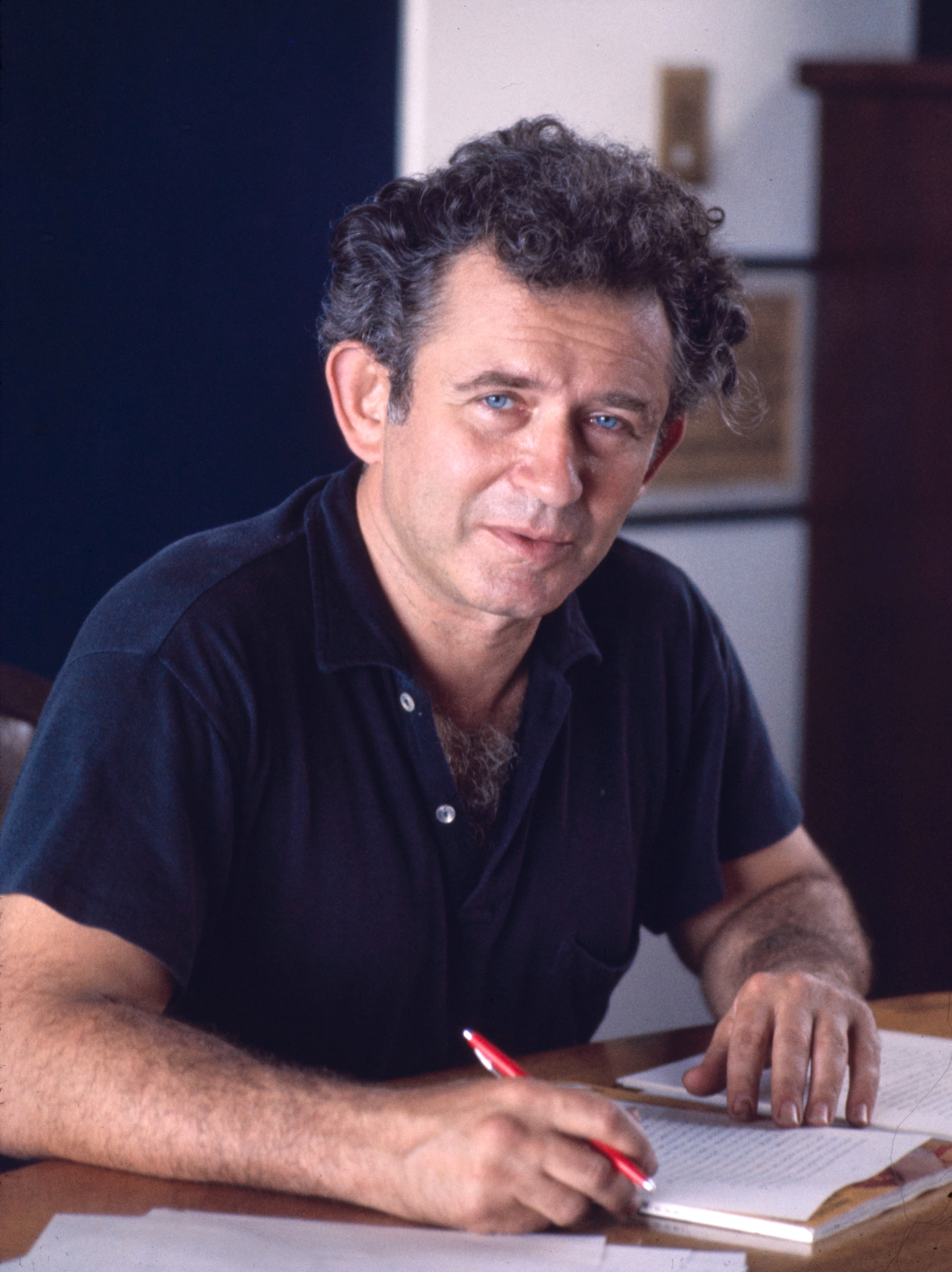
Mailer at his desk, 1967

Written in third person with Norman Mailer as the protagonist, this section is purported to be a first-hand account of Mailer's activities during the March. After opening with an excerpt from Time, the novel begins with Norman Mailer at home answering a call from Mitch Goodman, a friend from college, asking him to join the March on the Pentagon and specifically join a demonstration "at the Department of Justice to honor students who are turning in their draft cards". Convinced, Mailer promises to join him, but "I can't pretend I'm happy about it".

In Washington, Mailer begins to meet up with the other literary minds of the movement, including Robert Lowell and Dwight Macdonald, and it is decided that Mailer will be the MC for an event at the Ambassador theater. At this event Mailer drinks too much, embarrasses himself and has Time write that "mumbling and spewing obscenities as he staggered about the stage—which he had commandeered by threatening to beat up the previous M.C. after being late to the start of the ceremony—Mailer described in detail his search for a usable privy on the premises". Mailer alluded to himself as multiple egos such as; The Prince of Bourbon and The Beast and took being M.C as a form of competition with the other speakers. The next day, he watches many speeches at the event where 996 draft cards are handed in.

On the day of the March, a Saturday, Mailer is one of the first to arrive at the Pentagon and sets out to get himself arrested. He does so without resisting, and the rest of the part is him in custody. He at first interacts with a neo-Nazi at the site, before being moved to holding cell in a courthouse. While there, he debates whether he should give his fellow cellmates some of the money he brought to bail himself out, before giving much of it away. Rumors about how they will be released and what is going on at the Pentagon are the topics of conversation. They are then all moved to the Occoquan, Virginia workhouse, and Mailer settles himself in. During the time where he sleeps, the section "Why Are We in Vietnam" is presented. From his arrest onward, Mailer is periodically interviewed by a British journalist Dick Fountain with a cameraman for a documentary. Mailer is frequently very happy to see them and gladly gives interviews at their behest. In the prison, a deal is made where the protestors would plead "Nolo Contendere" and receive a five-day suspended sentence. Mailer initially refuses, wishing to plead guilty. Despite changing his mind, Mailer is still judged more harshly for his actions and, initially, is sentenced to 30 days in jail as well as a $50 fine. After much legalistic challenges, Mailer is released and gives a rambling speech about Jesus Christ to the press.

=== The Novel as History: The Battle of the Pentagon ===
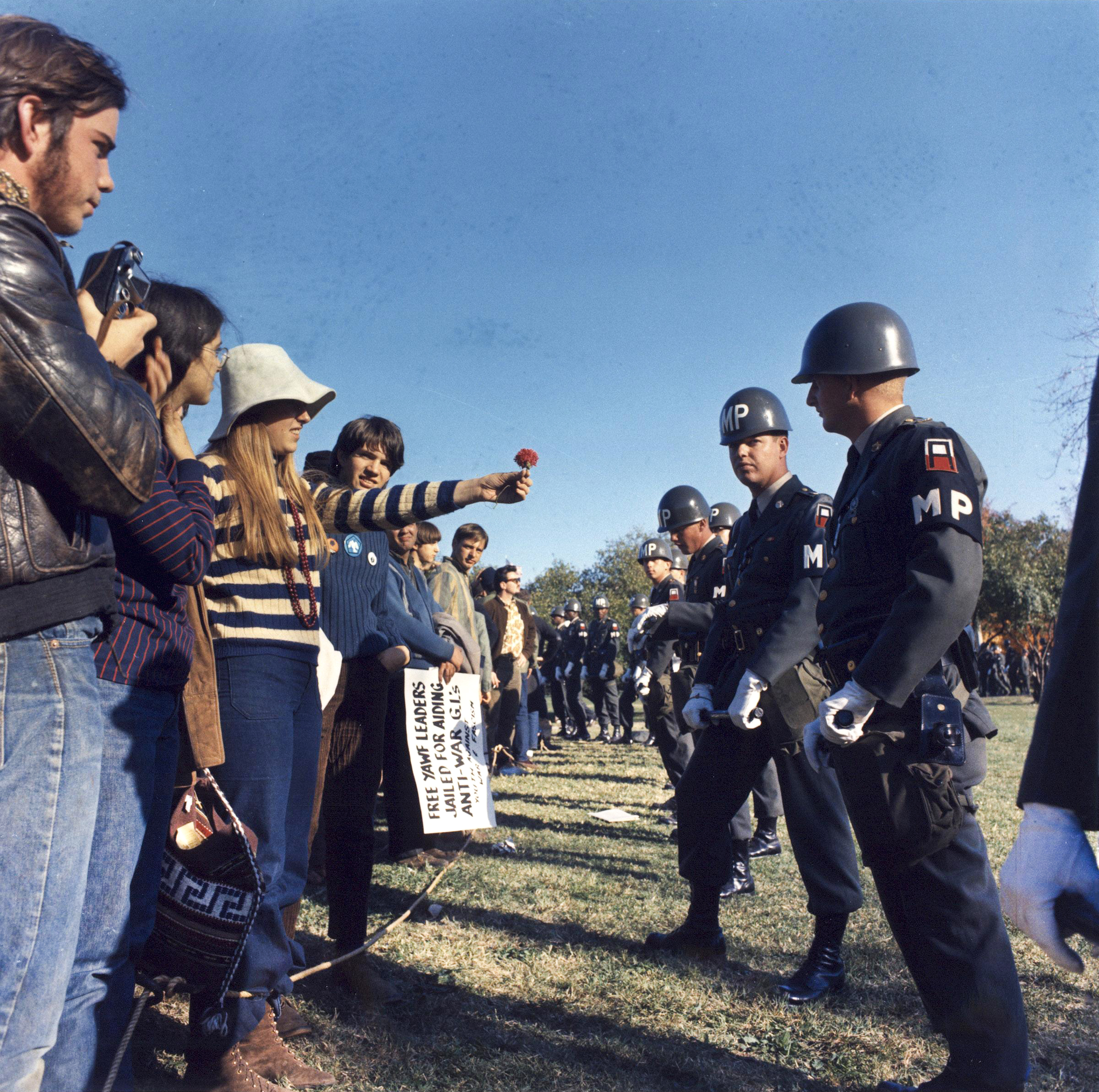
A protester hands a trooper a flower during the March on the Pentagon.

The second part begins with an image of "the Novelist in passing his baton to the Historian has a happy smile." This part of the book is much shorter and deals with the March on the Pentagon at large, beyond when Mailer was arrested and taken away. It begins with a discussion of the organization of both sides of the March. Groups are shown to organize which exact routes and which locations are to be used. The protestors and the government negotiate the minutia of the protests, with each side reluctant to give up the smallest ground.

Finally, on the day of the March, Mailer goes into the tactics and tools used by each side. He details the violent acts done by the military, using first hand accounts to illustrate the gravity of the actions. At the end of the day, the final hour of the protest is recorded in detail. As the loudspeakers tell the protestors to disperse before midnight, the last stragglers refuse to board the buses. Mailer again ends this section with religious imagery, and the last section, "The Metaphor Delivered", attempts to illustrate how Mailer feels about the war and the protests.

=== Why Are We in Vietnam? ===
"Why are we in Vietnam" is at the center of Mailer's The Armies of the Night. The chapter, located roughly at the end of the first half of the novel, is a clinical exploration of the involvement of the United States in Vietnam. The format differs from the previous sections the reader has followed the character of Norman Mailer along through preparations for the protest at the Pentagon, the protest itself, and finally Mailer's imprisonment. Following the imprisonment of Mailer, said character goes to sleep and this section occurs. This section, described by some as the author's dream, can be described as an internal monologue regarding the issues surrounding the Vietnam War. It appears strikingly out of touch with the surrounding portions of the novel, and could easily be transplanted into the editorial section of a newspaper. This section bridges the gap between the view of Norman Mailer the character and Norman Mailer, the author and presents his most straight forward discussion of the war in the novel.

Mailer divides American opinion on the Vietnam War into two camps, the Hawks and the Doves, the former in favor of the war and the latter opposed to it. Mailer argues that he disagrees with both camps and places himself in his own category of the Leftist-Conservative, a label he had employed in several of his other works. Mailer summarized the arguments each side had for and against the war, as well as his disagreements with both parties. He noted that the Hawks held five main arguments in favor of continuing or expanding the Vietnam War:

1. it demonstrated that China would not expand guerrilla activities in Asia without great expense;
2. rallied small Asian nations to America's side;
3. it underlined America's commitment to defending said small nations;
4. it was an inexpensive way to fight a great power, far less expensive than actually fighting a great power directly;
5. and was superior to starting a nuclear war with China.

The Doves countered that the Vietnam War failed to defend America, and only united Vietnam with China, nations previously at odds. Additionally, the war was not an inexpensive means of containing China, but rather a phenomenally expensive one. Mailer took care to note that the Vietnam War had already consumed itself. Finally, that the war's real damage took place in the United States, in which it contributed to the deterioration of civil rights and led to the exposure of students to drugs and nihilism.

Mailer argued that the Doves appeared to have more powerful arguments; however, they failed to respond to the Hawks' most pivotal claim, "The most powerful argument remained: what if we leave Vietnam, and all Asia eventually goes Communist? all of Southeast Asia, Indonesia, the Philippines, Australia, Japan, and India?" While the Doves in Mailer's mind failed to respond to this claim, Mailer himself proves willing to do so. Mailer noted, "While he thought it was probable most of Asia would turn to Communism in the decade after any American withdrawal from the continent, he did not know that it really mattered." Mailer embraced the possibility that an American withdrawal could lead to a Communist Asia; however, he did not think it was the calamity that most individuals thought it was. He instead argued that Communism wasn't monolithic. The struggle of America to export its technology and culture to Vietnam, regardless of the tremendous amount of money spent, highlighted that the Soviet Union would also be unable to unite all of Asia. To Mailer it was far more likely that these nations, even if they all succumb to Communism, would remain pitted against each other, one might even seek the aid of the United States against another. As such, Mailer argued that the only solution was to leave Asia to the Asians.

Finally Mailer turns to what he holds is the "saddest conclusion" of the Vietnam War, namely it highlighted the country's deep state of schizophrenia. The nation's state of schizophrenia had been a theme of Mailer's work, appearing in such pieces as The White Negro. In Why are We in Vietnam? Mailer noted, "The average American, striving to do his duty, drove further every day into working for Christ, and drove equally further each day in the opposite direction—into working for the absolute computer of the corporation ... So the average good Christian American secretly loved the war in Vietnam. It opened his emotions. He felt compassion for the hardships and the sufferings of the American boys in Vietnam, even the Vietnamese orphans." Mailer sets Christian ethics in opposition to America's corporate mentality. He argues that these ethics, the Christian and the corporate, are diametrically opposed. However, despite their incompatibility, the average American has managed to live with both in a remarkable feat of cognitive dissonance. The mental gymnastics required by this resulted in the nation's state of schizophrenia. Vietnam, and conflict at large, presented a type of catharsis which satisfied the moral and material ethics of the nation. The war presented the corporate ethic with the opportunity to expand its influence and technology, while it gave the American Christian outlets for their emotional urges such as pity. Mailer ultimately views these systems of ethics as logically incompatible, yet intertwined in the American psyche. He notes, "America needed the war. It would need a war so long as technology expanded on every road of communication, and the cities and corporations spread like cancer; the good Christian American needed the war or they would lose their Christ."

The year Armies was published, 1968, Mailer would begin work on another project, Miami and the Siege of Chicago, after witnessing the Republican and Democratic National Conventions that year. Mailer's recounting, though quite different in terms of his self-portrait, takes on a comparable rhetorical approach to evoking what he saw as historical underpinnings.

== Analysis ==
Jason Mosser notes a question The Armies of the Night poses, asking whether Mailer views history and journalism traditionally, or whether he views them as fiction. This question is derived from the subtitle of AON: "History as a Novel/The Novel as History", which creates an uncertainty about the objectivity of journalism. Mosser says that "Mailer's focus on his own perceptions and impressions does at times intensify the reader's consciousness" though it "embodies many of the qualities Mailer associates with fiction". With Mailer's "New Journalism" explored, the readers get the greater perspective that a novel offers, the informative account that history offers, but at the expense of the objectivity that journalism traditionally holds. Dwight MacDonald pinpoints the creation of this "New Journalism" at the explanation of irritation when Lowell credits Mailer as "the best journalist in America", causing Mailer to react to the situation and illustrate his own sensibility.

Neil Gordon takes a different approach to his analysis of The Armies of the Night as he searches for an insight into his own political consciousness. Being a 10-year-old child in 1968 when the book was published, Gordon analyzes the historical aspects for a further understanding of the sixties, the politics, and the novelistic side of Mailer. He questions the meaning of the novel given that Mailer did not experience some of what he perfectly described. For instance, the March on the Pentagon. Gordon referenced W.G. Sebald, The Natural History of Destruction as it suggests that "the truth or falsehood of a description of a historical event is not to be judged by the number of facts or witnesses but by the integrity of poetry of the language of description." He notes that The Armies of the Night is a representation of the novelist using his imagination rather than the recitation of facts.

Carl Rollyson recounts how many witnesses to the march noted the accuracy, specificity and level of granular detail in Mailer's retelling. The author praises Mailer for a remarkable achievement in essentially marrying poetry to prose- the scrupulous fact-checking and reporting of a historian with the cogent, penetrating analysis of human nature and overarching context that only a novelist so gifted could provide. In his "Armies of the Night, or Bad Man Makes Good", Dwight MacDonald's credits Mailer's self-awareness and specific details in "The Steps of the Pentagon" as evidence to Mailer's most superior work over his coverage of other non-personally experience events. Macdonald points to Mailer's "Jamesian control" over the tone and the "density of style" of wording and expression as links between Norman Mailer and Henry Adams. Gordon O. Taylor details the link between these "author-protagonists" in more depth in his article Of Adams and Aquarius.

Adam Gopnik states that the real subject in The Armies of the Night is the generational clash between men in the 1950s who were brought up with different ideologies. Mailer's generation was brought up "in a kind of sober radicalism that valued intellect, exemplified by literature, above all; they found themselves protesting the Vietnam War with a new generation that valued emotional affect, exemplified by music, above all." Mailer also mentions how "the younger protestors" were dressed as a way to highlight the difference between the generations. Gopnik also analyzes the similarity between Mailer's era and how things are today. In the climax of the novel when protestors confronts a group of military policemen outside of the Pentagon, Gopnik notes that it showcases the two Americas, divided in "class and the rural and urban lines that is still relevant today."

New York Times critic Paul Berman has hailed The Armies of the Night as a "masterpiece," the first part of a two-volume participant-observer-journalistic portrait of the antiwar movement of the late 1960s—bookended by Miami and the Siege of Chicago (on the Republican and Democratic National Conventions in the summer of 1968.

Warner Berthoff states that the plot Armies of the Night is strictly about the "world of totalitarian civil power that in our lifetime has clamped down on every natural life agency, every human usage, and custom of existence". This power is what not only sheds light on the present but also "consumes the past" and gives hope of doing away with future territories. Though the plot of this novel seems quite serious, Berthoff mentions that the novel has some moments of comic exaggerations and "a broad yet dead serious social mockery" due to Mailer's self projection image which some critics call an egotistical rant. This egotism is an essential element because it becomes a theme of discourse which is the field of force that is made up of the totalitarianism's grip on the technocratic capitalist order.

== Reception ==
The Armies of the Night won the Pulitzer Prize for General Nonfiction, the National Book Award in the arts and letters category, and a George Polk Award for magazine reporting. AON did not become a best-seller, but has been in-print since its publication and frequently makes lists of the best nonfiction books of the twentieth century. The major reviews were resoundingly positive, with only John Simon (1968) and Mario Puzo (1968) dissenting.

Receiving praise from Alfred Kazin in The New York Times, Armies of the Night was thought to be an "appropriate and timely contribution" to "the great stage that is American democracy" because it was "so intelligent, mischievous, penetrating and alive". It became the historical piece to reveal America's deepest personal and political concerns at the center of a "developing crisis". Kazin went so far as to declare that the award-winning work cemented Mailer's place as the preeminent American novelist of his generation, representing a watershed achievement not only for Mailer, but also for Jews.

In his article "Confessions of the Last American", Conor Cruise O'Brien claimed AON as an important resource for historians "concerned with the moral and emotional climate of America in the late Sixties". O'Brien narrows historical information to the white middle-class and intellectual participation in the protests, along with race relations. Praised for his scholarly analysis in AON, O'Brien credits Mailer for lending an important breathe of life into the history surrounding the march on the Pentagon through his "honest" re-telling of events.

In September 2021, actor and television host LeVar Burton (best known for hosting Reading Rainbow) was interviewed by The Daily Show's Trevor Noah and asked what he does when he is not enjoying a book. Burton said, "I've only ever quit reading one book in my life: Norman Mailer's Armies of the Night. Bored me to tears. Bored the shit out of me." Pressed by Noah on this revelation, Burton elaborated (through broken laughter) that the book was forced upon him in school as a reading assignment and he just had to "fake my way through it, because I couldn't do it."

== Notable people in the book ==
- H. Rap Brown
- William Sloane Coffin
- Ella Collins
- Noam Chomsky
- David Dellinger
- Paul Goodman (writer)
- The Fugs
- Abbie Hoffman
- Lyndon B. Johnson
- Tuli Kupferberg
- Nelson Algren
- Robert Lowell
- Sidney Lens
- Dwight Macdonald
- A. J. Muste
- Jerry Rubin
- Dr. Benjamin Spock
- Dagmar Wilson
- MC5
- Cassius Clay (named Muhammad Ali in 1964)
- Mitchell Goodman
- Donald Kalish
- Malcolm X

== See also ==
- CORE
- SNCC
- War in Vietnam
- The Fugs
