= Flower Power (photograph) =

1967 photograph by Bernie Boston

The Flower Power photograph by Bernie Boston, taken during the March on the Pentagon, October 21, 1967

Flower Power is the title of a photograph taken by American photographer Bernie Boston for the now-defunct newspaper The Washington Evening Star. Taken on October 21, 1967, during the March on the Pentagon by the National Mobilization Committee to End the War in Vietnam, the photo shows a protester (likely George Harris) placing a carnation into the barrel of an M14 rifle held by a soldier of the 503rd Military Police Battalion (Airborne).

The photograph was nominated for the 1967 Pulitzer Prize.

== Events ==
The National Mobilization Committee to End the War in Vietnam's March on the Pentagon took place on October 21, 1967. When the antiwar demonstrators approached The Pentagon, they were confronted by a squad of soldiers from the 503rd Military Police Battalion (Airborne). The soldiers pointed their rifles, marched into the crowd and formed a semicircle around the demonstrators to prevent them from climbing the Pentagon steps. Bernie Boston, newspaper photographer for The Washington Evening Star (shortened to The Washington Star in later years), had been assigned by his editor to cover the demonstration. Boston was sitting on a wall at the mall entrance which allowed him to see the events unfold. In a 2005 interview he said, "When I saw the sea of demonstrators, I knew something had to happen. I saw the troops march down into the sea of people and I was ready for it." A young man emerged from the crowd of demonstrators and started placing carnations into the barrels of their rifles. Boston captured the moment in what would become an iconic image and his signature photograph.

When Boston showed the photograph to his editor at the Star, "the editor didn't see the importance", and the picture was run on a page deep inside the newspaper. It did not gain recognition until Boston entered it into photography competitions, which it won.

== Legacy ==
=== Identity of the demonstrator ===
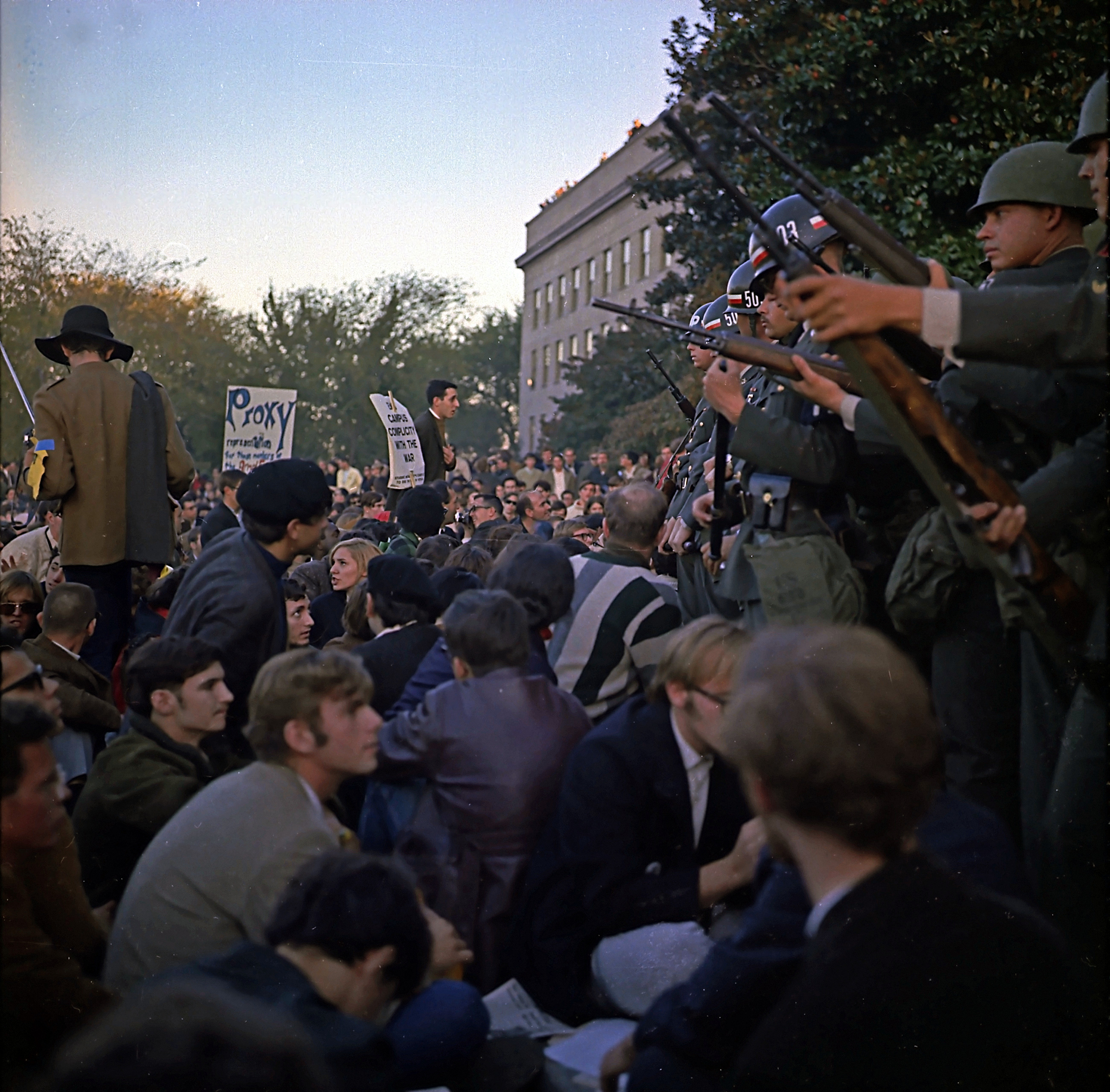
Young protesters at the March on the Pentagon

The young man in the photo is most commonly identified as George Edgerly Harris III, an 18-year-old actor from New York who had moved to San Francisco in 1967. In 2005, Boston talked in an interview about the effort it took to learn that the protester was Harris. Harris, who performed under the stage name Hibiscus and co-founded The Cockettes, a "flamboyant, psychedelic gay-themed drag troupe", died in the early 1980s during the beginning of the HIV/AIDS epidemic.

Paul Krassner, in a 2008 blogger's article written for the Huffington Post a week after Bernie Boston died, said the young man in the photo was Joel Tornabene, a fellow counter-culture leader of the Youth International Party (the Yippies) who lived in Berkeley, California in the 1960s. Tornabene, like Harris and Boston, died before Krassner posted this statement.

=== Symbolic significance ===
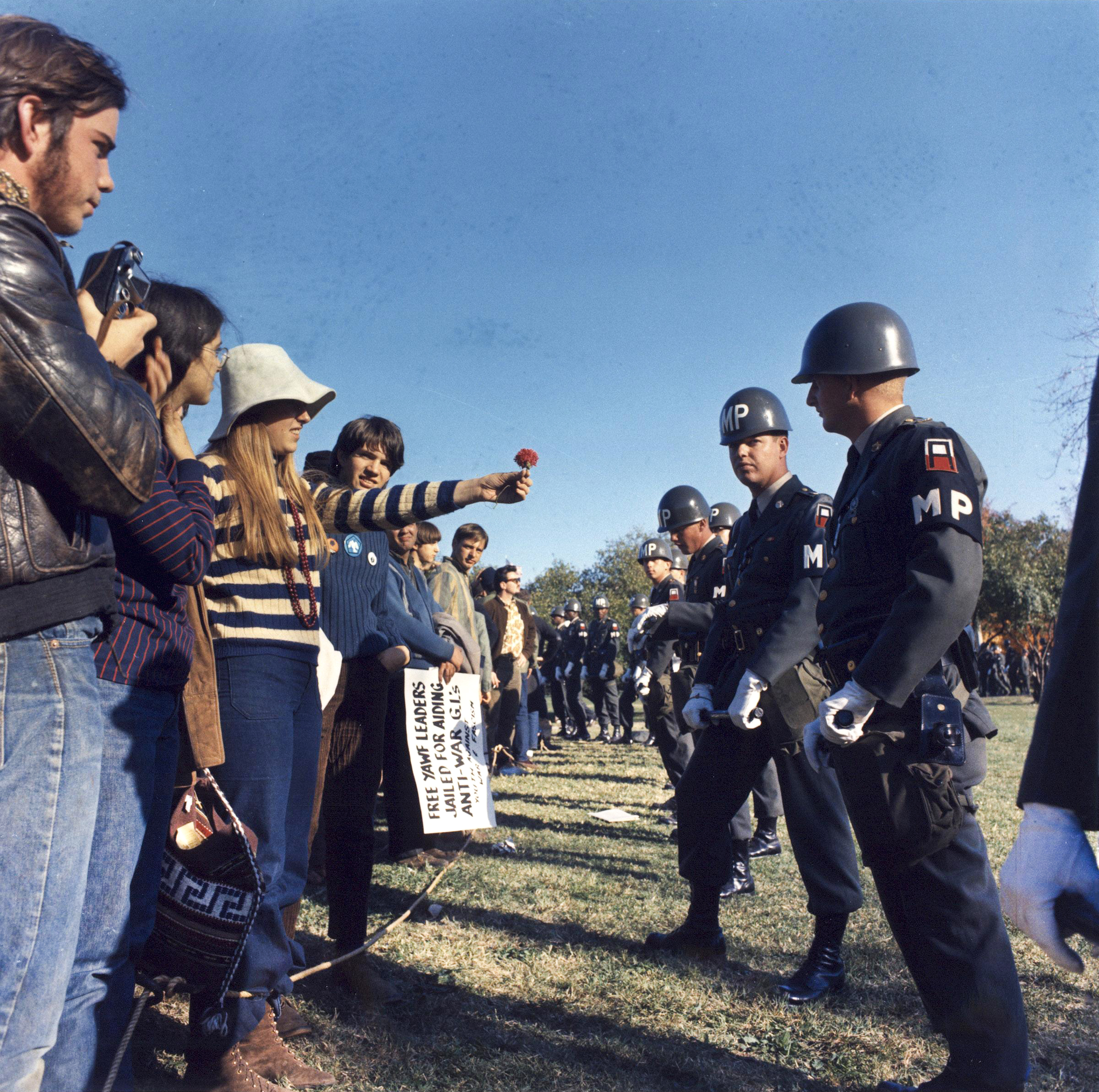
A young woman offers a flower as a symbol of peace to a military police officer at the March on the Pentagon

The Flower power movement began in Berkeley, California as a means of symbolic protest against the Vietnam War. Beat Generation writer Allen Ginsberg, in his November 1965 essay How to Make a March/Spectacle, promoted the use of "masses of flowers" to be handed to policemen, the press, politicians, and spectators to fight violence with peace.

They intended the use of nonviolent objects such as toys, flags, candy, and music to show that the peace movement was not associated with anger or violence. Members of the movement tried to offset the rallies of the Hells Angels motorcycle club, who supported the war.

=== Cultural significance ===
Flower Power was nominated for the 1967 Pulitzer Prize.

It had an influential effect on both the anti-war movement of the sixties and on how photojournalism can help a movement.

Specific exhibits and discussions have been curated solely around the photograph to display the political, cultural, and social aspects of the Flower Power movement. The exhibit From Kennedy to Kent State: Images of a Generation was shown at the Worcester Art Museum in Worcester, Massachusetts, where Boston's image was displayed as a large gelatin silver print. The image was included as a representation of the antiwar movement.

In 1993, for his body of work – including Flower Power and his Pulitzer-nominated 1987 photograph of Coretta Scott King unveiling a bust of her late husband, Martin Luther King Jr., in the U.S. Capitol – Boston received the Joseph A. Sprague Memorial Award from the National Press Photographers Association, their highest honor.

Flower Power continues to be used as an iconic image of the 1960s.

== See also ==
- List of photographs considered the most important
- George Washington University student photographer Berl Brechner took a photograph of the same moment from a different angle, published in The Hatchet, October 24, 1967, with the caption, "Flower Power."
- The Ultimate Confrontation was a similar photograph taken by Marc Riboud the same day.
- Carnation Revolution
