= 1967 March on the Pentagon =

1967 American anti-war protest

March on the Pentagon
- Part of the opposition to the Vietnam War
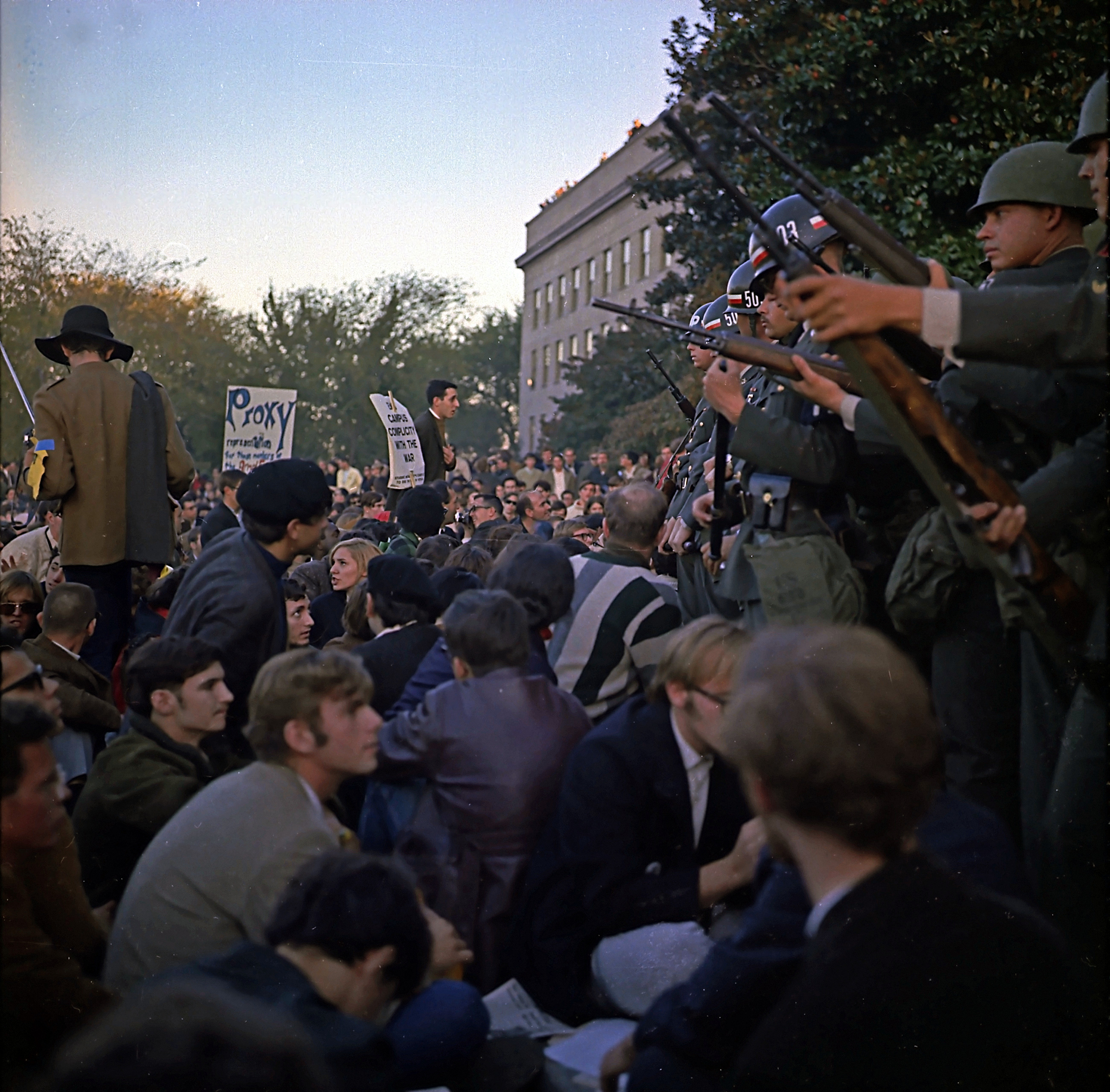
- Protesters face troops guarding the Pentagon
- Date: October 21, 1967
- Location: Washington D.C., United States
- Goals: Focus attention on the Anti-Vietnam War movement
- Result: Protesters disbanded

Parties
Protesters: National Mobilization Committee to End the War in Vietnam	Government: 82nd Airborne Division; Military Police Corps; U.S. Marshals Service

Lead figures
David Dellinger; Abbie Hoffman; Allen Ginsberg; Jerry Rubin; Gary Snyder; Michael Bowen	Lt. Gen. Richard J. Seitz

Number
100,000 attendees (50,000 marchers)	

The 1967 March on the Pentagon was a massive demonstration against the Vietnam War that took place on October 21, 1967. The protest, organized by the National Mobilization to End the War in Vietnam, was one of the first major national protests against the Vietnam War, marking a significant escalation in the anti-war movement. The event began with more than 100,000 protesters at a rally near the Lincoln Memorial in Washington, D.C. Later about 50,000 people marched across the Potomac River to the Pentagon and sparked a confrontation with U.S. Army paratroopers who were standing guard there. The demonstration was notable for its diverse coalition of participants, including students, clergy, and countercultural figures, as well as for the symbolic acts such as the attempted "levitation" of the Pentagon. The demonstrations were highly polarizing, and also produced iconic imagery, including a photograph of a protester placing flowers into the barrel of a paratroopers' rifle, symbolizing peaceful resistance.

Following a concert by Phil Ochs, as well as speeches from David Dellinger and Dr. Benjamin Spock, around 50,000 of those attending were then led by social activist Abbie Hoffman and marched from the Lincoln Memorial to The Pentagon in nearby Arlington, Virginia to participate in a second rally.

== Background ==
In the evening of January 14, 1967 various countercultural figures celebrating the Human Be-In converged in artist Michael Bowen’s San Francisco painting studio. Bowen's guests in the room included Allen Ginsberg, Gary Snyder, Timothy Leary, Ed Sanders, and Jerry Rubin. The small group would eventually conceive of a plan to make a protest march to the Pentagon, Gary Snyder would suggest the need for an exorcism of the Pentagon. Abbie Hoffman, separate from the group, would propose that in order to draw attention to the Pentagon through shock value, which activists saw as the epicenter of military aggression, they should employ the use of psychic energy and physically levitate the building. Michael Bowen would suggest the purpose of the march be to actually levitate the building.

The National Mobilization Committee to End the War in Vietnam (Mobe) played a major role in organizing the protest. David Dellinger, a prominent pacifist, appointed Jerry Rubin, who led the large Vietnam Day Committee at the University of California, Berkeley, to organize a march, aiming to attract young, educated college students to the cause. Abbie Hoffman had recently joined Mobe after previous experience in the civil rights movement. After a spiritual retreat to Mexico, Michael Bowen would join in on a meeting in New York City to plan the march. Out of all the activists in the room he was the only one who argued that the Pentagon would be literally levitated, while the others only claimed it would be "levitated" for shock value.

== Protest ==
On October 21, 1967, approximately 100,000 people gathered near the Lincoln Memorial in Washington D.C., to protest the Vietnam War. The demonstration began with a rally featuring speeches from notable figures such as Dr. Benjamin Spock and performances by countercultural folk singer Phil Ochs. Additional notable attendees included persons such as Norman Mailer, Robert Lowell, Dwight MacDonald, Noam Chomsky, and Paul Goodman were in attendance. The attendees were socially diverse ranging from middle class professionals, clergymen, hippies, and black activists.

From the Lincoln Memorial, protesters then marched towards the Pentagon. As the protesters neared the Pentagon, they were met by soldiers of the 82nd Airborne Division who formed a human barricade blocking the Pentagon steps to prevent access to the building.

In a symbolic act, activist Abbie Hoffman vowed to levitate the Pentagon. Hoffman claimed he would employ the use of psychic energy to levitate the Pentagon until it turned orange and begin to vibrate, at which time the war in Vietnam would end. The event was accompanied by Allen Ginsberg leading Tibetan chants to assist Hoffman.

The protests escalated into a confrontation between demonstrators and military personnel. Some protesters attempted to enter the Pentagon but were repelled by soldiers using tear gas and physical force. Protesters faced down troops with bayonets for hours. The standoff continued into the night and around midnight, troops chased most protesters away. The protest was met with resistance from military police and U.S Marshalls, resulting in a total of forty-seven injuries between the protesters, soldiers, and U.S. Marshalls and approximately 682 arrests.

== Cultural impact ==
The 1967 March on the Pentagon became emblematic of the countercultural and anti-war movements of the 1960s reflecting a convergence of political protest and countercultural expression. Its significance lies not only in its scale and direct confrontation with a central institution of U.S. military power, but also in the lasting images and narratives generated in American culture.

The protest itself inspired a range of artistic, literary, and scholarly responses that helped solidify its place in American cultural memory. Norman Mailer's The Armies of the Night, a 1968 nonfiction novel recounting his participation in the protest, won both the Pulitzer Prize and National Book Award. His narrative framed the event as a symbolic clash between state and authority and a diverse resistance movement grounded in personal conscience and civil disobedience. Media coverage and photography, particularly the widely circulated image of a protester placing a flower into the barrel of a soldier's rifles, further shaped public perception by visually encapsulating the concept of nonviolent resistance.

In retrospect, the march is often viewed as both a high point of 1960s activism and a reflection of the deep generational, cultural, and political divides that marked the era. Its legacy is preserved in literary works, photos, and in the continued usage of the Pentagon as a symbolic site of protest.

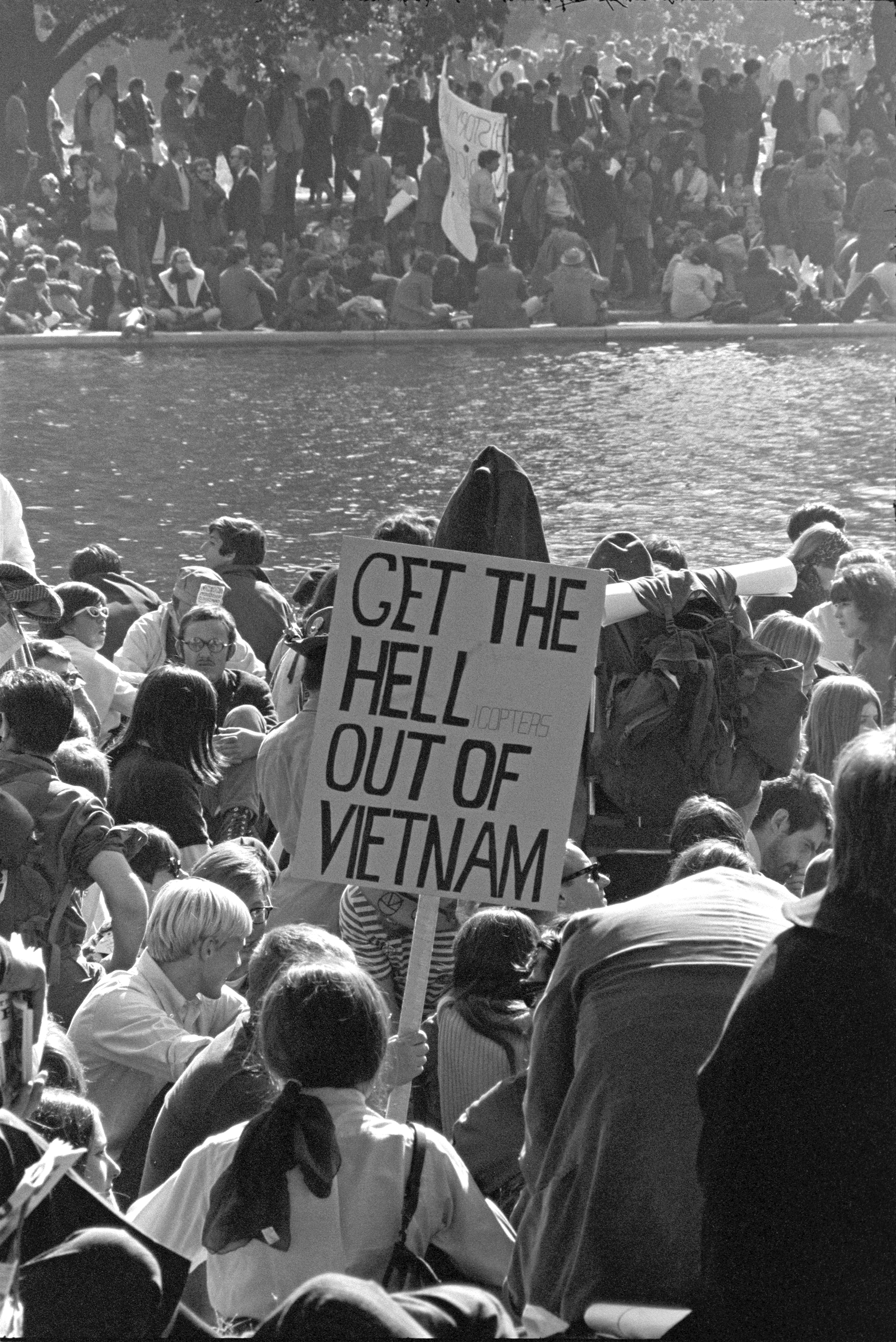
Protesters at the Lincoln Memorial Reflecting Pool.

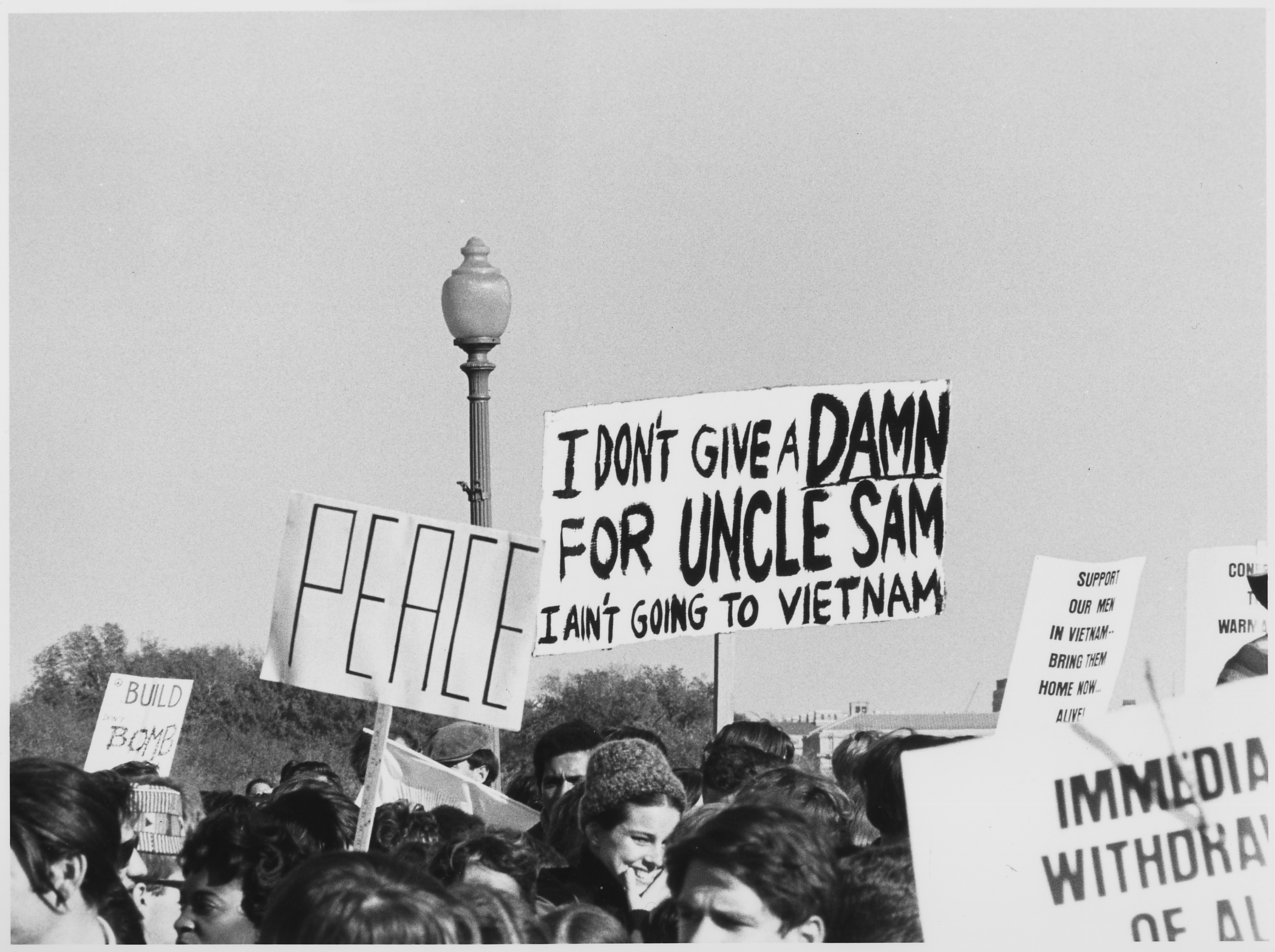
Protesters marching in the street.

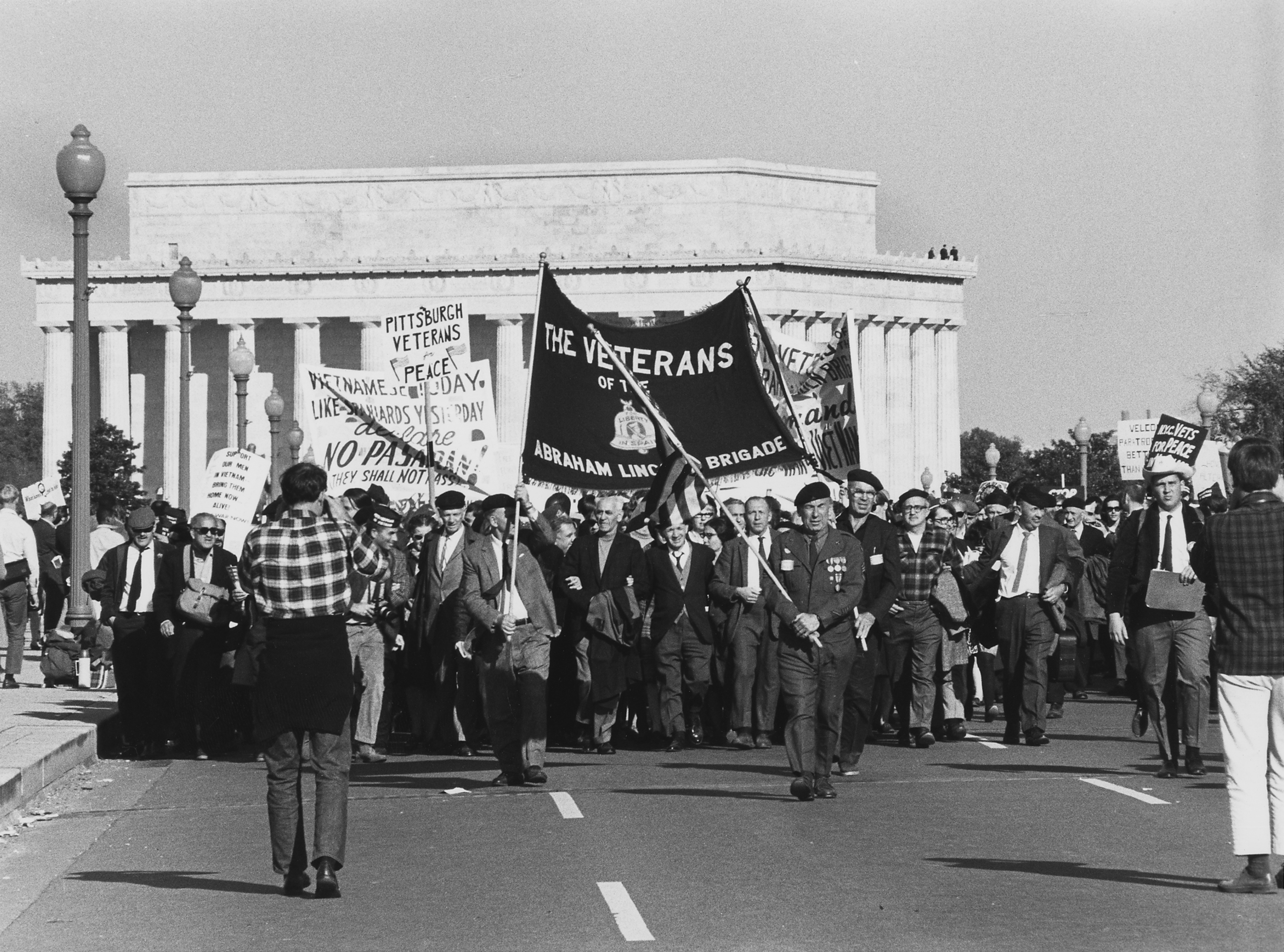
Abraham Lincoln Brigade veterans marching from the Lincoln Memorial.

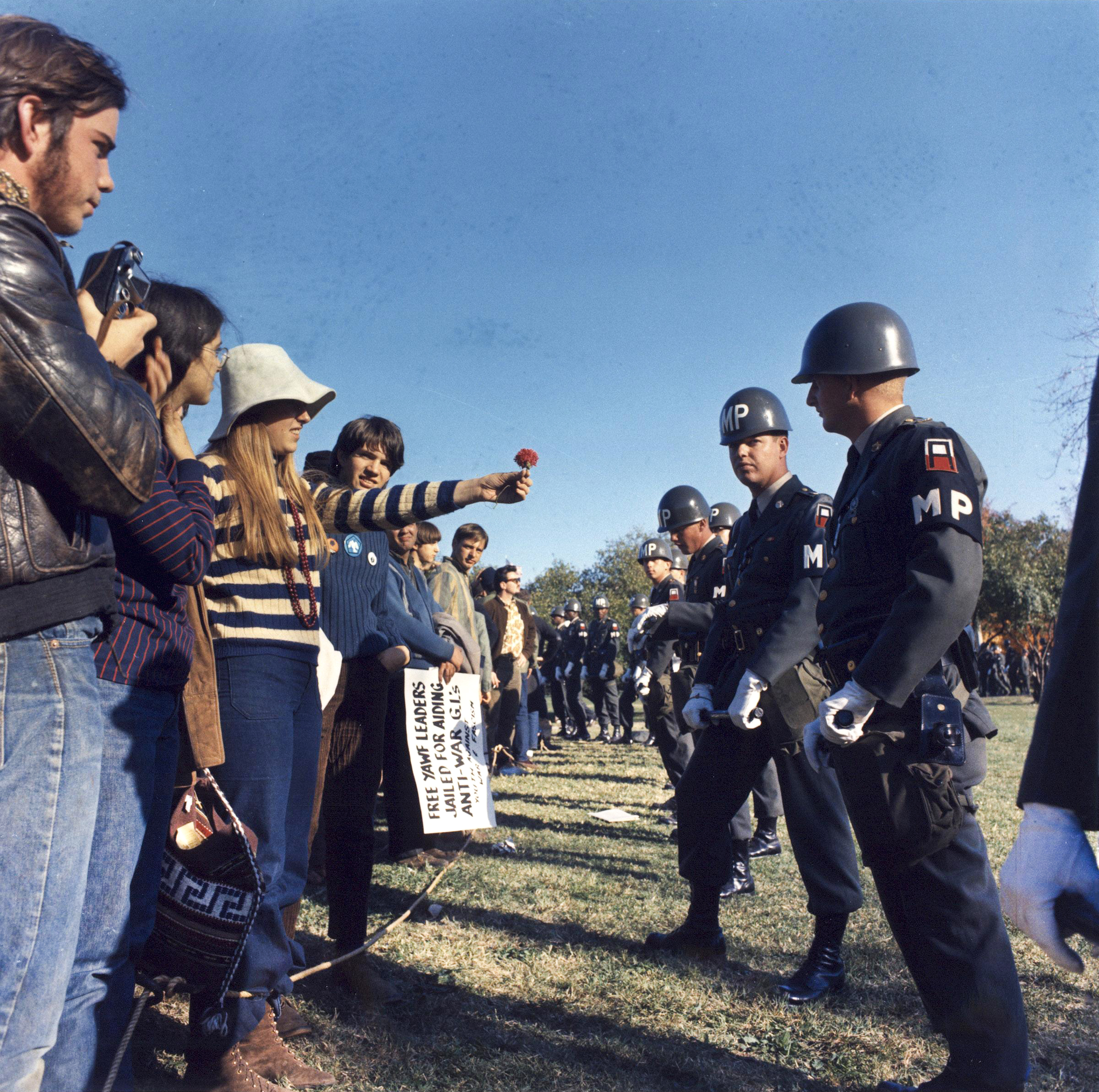
A protester hands a trooper a flower.

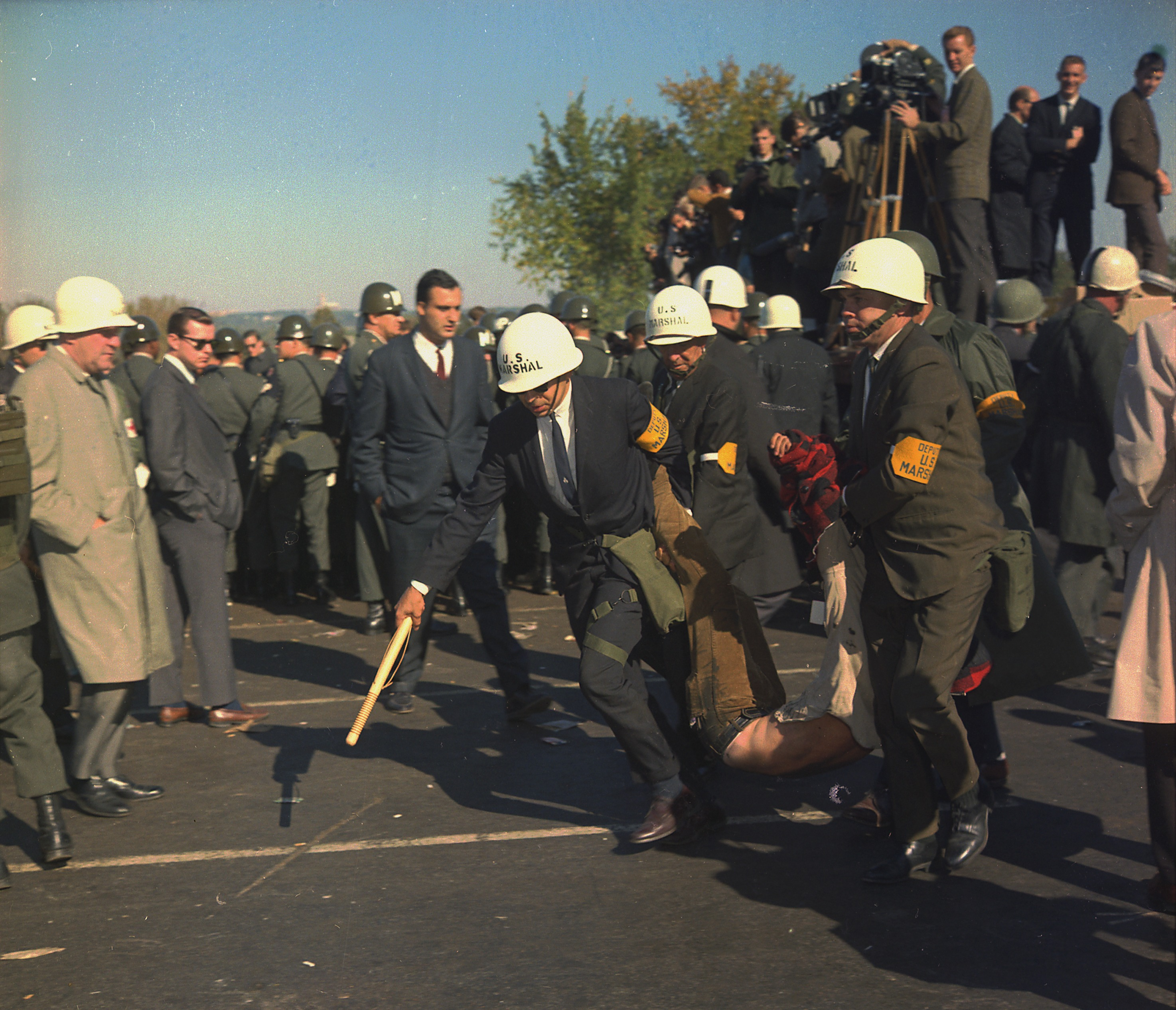
US Marshals carrying off a protester.

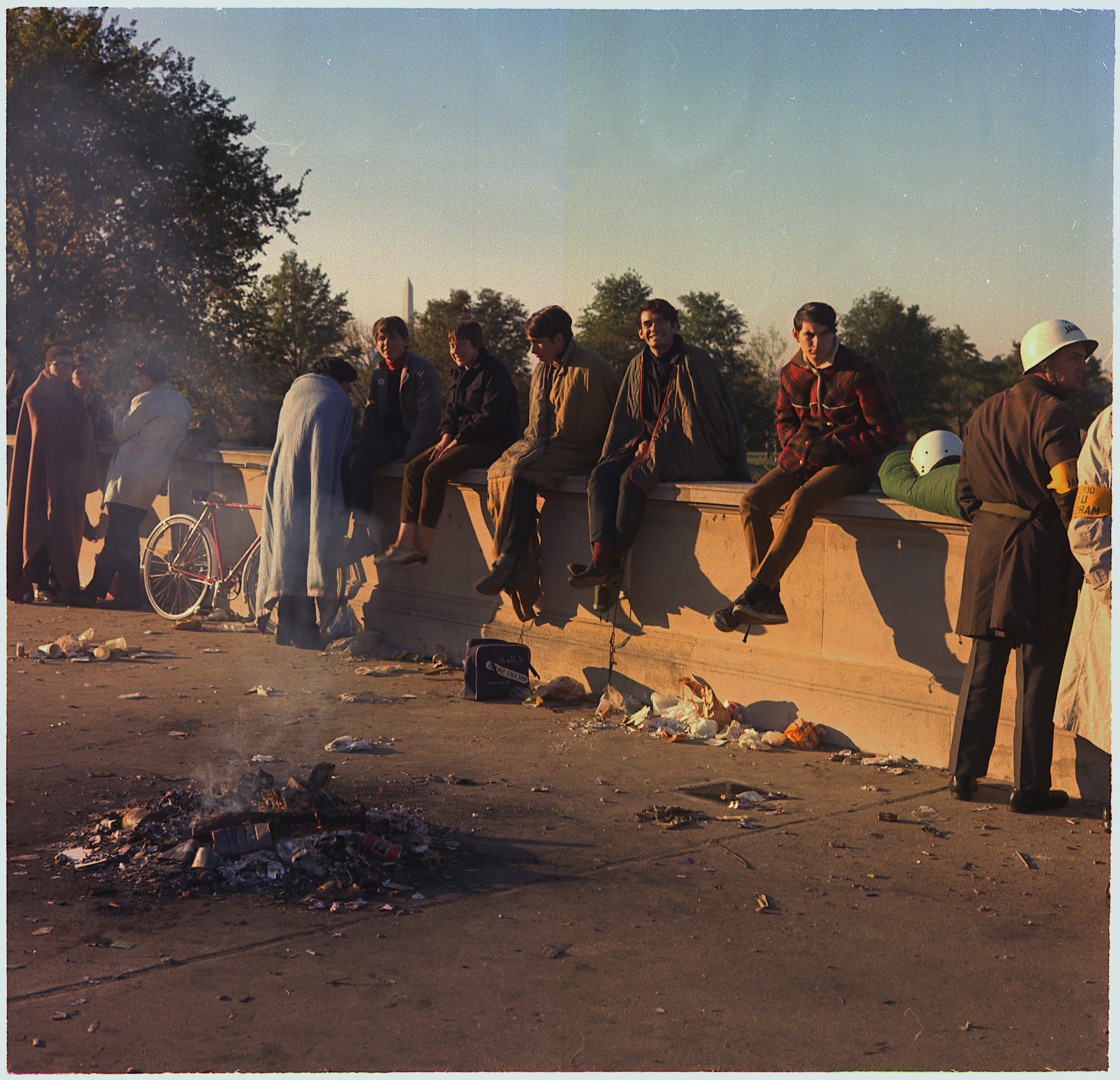
Protesters around a fire at the Capitol Mall.

== See also ==
- Flower Power (photograph)
