= National Mobilization Committee to End the War in Vietnam =

Coalition of American activist groups (1966–69)

- Successor: New Mobilization Committee to End the War in Vietnam
- Formation: 1966
- Dissolved: 1969
- Type: Anti-war activist organization
- Legal status: Defunct
- Purpose: Oppose involvement in the Vietnam War
- Location: United States

The Spring Mobilization Committee to End the War in Vietnam, which became the National Mobilization Committee to End the War in Vietnam, was a coalition of American antiwar activists formed in November 1966 to organize large demonstrations in opposition to the Vietnam War. The organization was informally known as "the Mobe".

Individuals and organizations associated either with the Spring Mobilization to End the War in Vietnam or the National Mobilization Committee to End the War in Vietnam include Benjamin Spock and SANE, Sidney Peck, Eric Weinberger, David Dellinger, Jerry Rubin, James Bevel, Stew Albert, A. J. Muste, Dr. Martin Luther King Jr., Coretta Scott King, Rennie Davis, Karen Wald, Fred Halstead, Bradford Lyttle, Charles Owen Rice, Vietnam Summer, Cornell Professor Robert Greenblatt (who became national coordinator of the Mobilization to End the War), and Tom Hayden.

== History ==
=== Formation ===
The November 8 Mobilization Committee formed in Cleveland, Ohio September 10–11, 1966. The Spring Mobilization Committee to End the War in Vietnam emerged from the November 8th Mobilization Committee, and was cemented at the Cleveland Conference on November 26, 1966. The national director was Reverend James Bevel.

=== April 15, 1967, demonstrations ===
On April 15, 1967, the Spring Mobilization's massive march against the Vietnam War from Central Park to the United Nations attracted hundreds of thousands of people, including Martin Luther King Jr., Harry Belafonte, James Bevel, and Dr. Benjamin Spock, who marched and spoke at the event. During the event many draft cards were burned, according to the New York Times. Among the speakers at the simultaneous march in San Francisco were Coretta Scott King, Eldridge Cleaver, and Julian Bond.

At the New York march its last speaker, James Bevel, the Spring Mobilization's chairman and initiator of the march on the U.N. (until Bevel came aboard at the invitation of A. J. Muste and David Dellinger the plan was for just an April 15 rally in Central Park), made an impromptu announcement that the next major anti-war gathering would be in Washington, D.C.

Bevel's announcement brought about the Spring Mobilization Conference, a gathering of 700 antiwar activists held in Washington, D.C., May 20–21, 1967, called to evaluate April's massive antiwar demonstrations. It was organized to chart a future course for the antiwar movement, and set another large antiwar action for the fall of 1967 and created an administrative committee—the National Mobilization Committee to End the War in Vietnam—to plan it.

=== 1967 March on the Pentagon ===
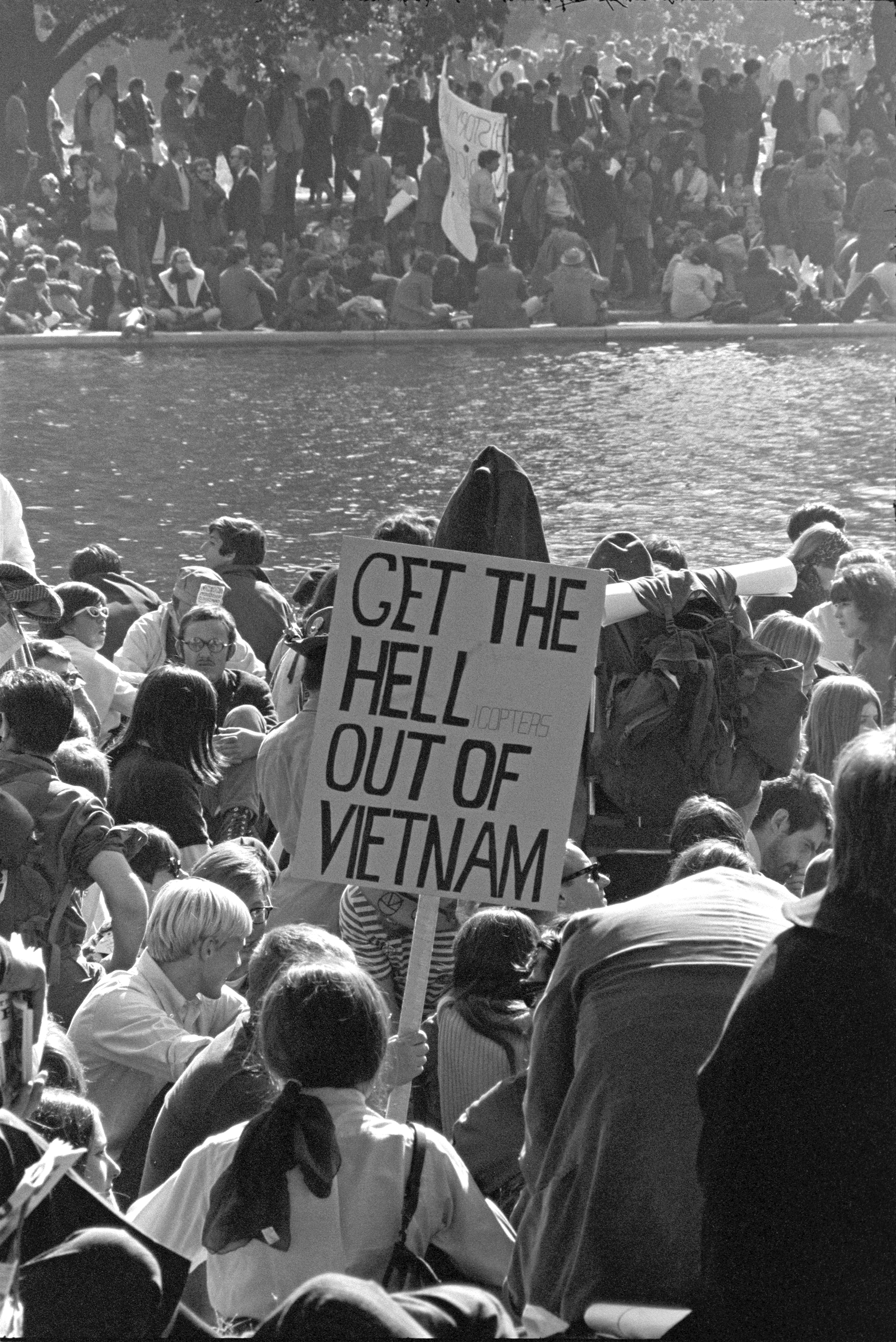
Vietnam War protestors at the 1967 March on the Pentagon.

The Mobe then planned and organized a large demonstration for Washington, D.C., on October 21, 1967. This demonstration was a rally at West Potomac Park near the Lincoln Memorial and a march to the Pentagon, where another rally would be held in a parking lot, followed by civil disobedience on the steps of the Pentagon itself. The action was known as the "March on the Pentagon."

Hoping to attract young, educated college students, Mobe coordinator David Dellinger appointed Jerry Rubin, who led the large Vietnam Day Committee at the University of California, Berkeley, to organize the march. The initial D.C. rally, which was galvanized by a concert performance from counterculture folk singer Phil Ochs, drew approximately 70,000 participants at the Lincoln Memorial. Following Ochs' concert, as well as speeches from Dellinger and Dr. Spock, around 50,000 of those attending were then led by social activist Abbie Hoffman and marched from the Lincoln Memorial to The Pentagon in nearby Arlington, Virginia to participate in a second rally.

About 650 people, including novelist Norman Mailer, were arrested for civil disobedience on the steps of the Pentagon. A few individuals such as Allen Ginsberg, Ed Sanders, Abbie Hoffman and Jerry Rubin (Hoffman and Rubin would co-found the Yippies later in '67) attempted by means of meditation and chanting to "levitate" the building and "exorcise the evil within." These events were chronicled by Norman Mailer in his non-fiction novel The Armies of the Night.

=== 1968 Chicago Democratic National Convention demonstrations ===
Following the Pentagon demonstration, the Mobe began discussion and planning for demonstrations at the 1968 Democratic National Convention, to be held in Chicago, where President Lyndon B. Johnson was expected to be nominated for a second term.

Rennie Davis and Tom Hayden were the key Mobe organizers for the Chicago demonstration, and would later be indicted for conspiracy and inciting a riot as members of the Chicago Seven. The Chicago demonstrations drew only 10,000 participants because it was widely anticipated that the mayor of Chicago, Richard J. Daley, would deploy his police to prevent marches to the site of the convention.

Norman Mailer wrote a non-fiction novel about both the 1968 Democratic and Republican Conventions entitled Miami and the Siege of Chicago.

=== Further activity ===
Following the election of Richard M. Nixon, the Mobe organized a "counter-inaugural" to take place in Washington, D.C., on the day of Nixon's inauguration. This demonstration also attracted about 10,000 people and was accompanied by street violence.

The National Mobilization Committee to End the War in Vietnam then disbanded.

Future national marches against the Vietnam war would be organized by other groups. The similarly named and inspired New Mobilization Committee to End the War in Vietnam (New Mobe) was founded at a conference at Case Western Reserve University in July 1969, and, together with the Vietnam Moratorium Committee and the Student Mobilization Committee (SMC), organized the October 15, 1969 Moratorium to End the War in Vietnam which resulted in large demonstrations against the Vietnam War held nationwide. The groups then organized another large demonstration in Washington, D.C., to occur a month later, on November 15, 1969, which was also attended by a large crowd.

== See also ==
- Flower Power (photograph)
- The Ultimate Confrontation: The Flower and the Bayonet
- List of peace activists
- List of anti-war organizations

== Media ==
- The Armies of the Night (book by Norman Mailer)
- Miami and the Siege of Chicago (book by Norman Mailer)
- The Trial of the Chicago 7 (2020 film)

== External sources ==
- Walking tour of New York entry
- National Mobilization Committee to End the War in Vietnam Records, in the Swarthmore College Peace Collection, Swarthmore College
- Spring Mobilization performances and speeches given on April 15 1967 in the Swarthmore College Peace Collection Sound Recordings
