= Albert Hanson (academic) =

English political scientist (1913–1971)

Albert Henry Hanson (20 April 1913 – 27 April 1971) was the first Professor of Politics at the University of Leeds.

== Early life and education ==
Hanson was born in Swindon and educated at Swindon Grammar School and Jesus College, Oxford, graduating with a first-class BA in Modern History in 1934. Whilst at Oxford University, he joined the Communist Party of Great Britain, remaining a member until 1953 when he concluded that membership conflicted with his academic independence.

== Military service ==
After leaving Oxford, and spending some years as a teacher, Hanson joined the army in 1941, serving in the Royal Army Ordnance Corps and the Royal Artillery. He reached the rank of Major and finished his service as Chief Instructor at the Army School of Education in Maynyo, Burma.

== Academic career ==
After two years at the Coopers Hill Emergency Training College, in 1948 he was appointed a Lecturer in Public Administration at the University of Leeds. It was largely through his efforts that politics and public administration became established topics of study at the university. He was promoted to Reader in 1956 and then became Leeds University's first Professor of Politics in 1963, a post he was to hold until his death in 1971.

Hanson's particular interests were public administration and nationalized industries. He became known for his work in these fields in developing countries, particularly India and in Africa, leading to many invitations to teach and lecture abroad. His work in this field included Public Enterprise and Economic Development and The Process of Planning in India. Other areas of study included parliamentary reform and the teaching of political science in universities in Britain.

== Death ==
Hanson died in 1971, aged 58.
