= Marc Riboud =

French photographer

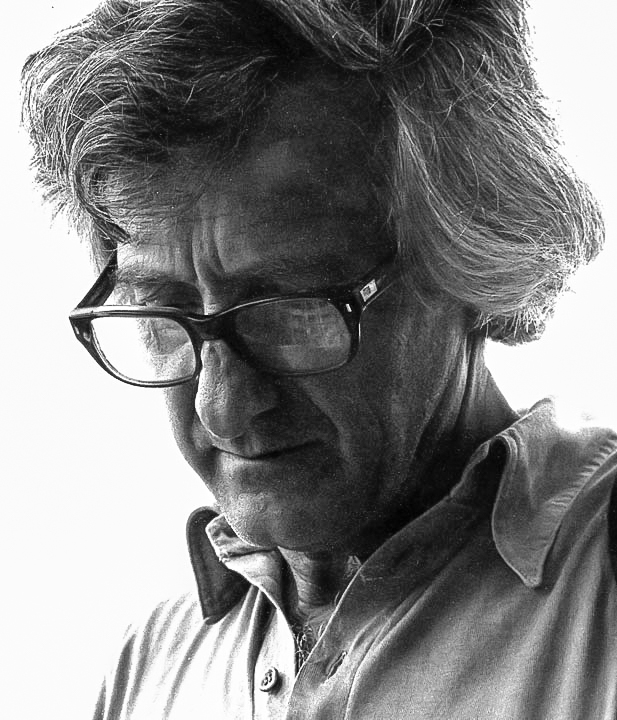
- Marc Riboud in 1975
- Born: 24 June 1923; Saint-Genis-Laval, France
- Died: 30 August 2016 (aged 93); Paris, France
- Education: École centrale de Lyon
- Occupation: Photographer
- Spouse: Barbara Chase-Riboud (1961–1981; divorced)
- Children: 2
- Awards: Lucie Award (2006); Sony World Photography Awards (2009); Prix Nadar (2012)
- Website: www.marcriboud.com

Marc Riboud (French: [ʁibu]; 24 June 1923 – 30 August 2016) was a French photographer, best known for his extensive reports on the Far East: The Three Banners of China, Face of North Vietnam, Visions of China, and In China.

== Early life and education ==
Riboud was born in Saint-Genis-Laval and went to the lycée in Lyon. He photographed his first picture in 1937, using his father's Vest Pocket Kodak camera. As a young man during World War II, he was active in the French Resistance, from 1943 to 1945. After the war, he studied engineering at the École Centrale de Lyon from 1945 to 1948.

== Career ==
Until 1951 Riboud worked as an engineer in Lyon factories, but took a week-long picture-taking vacation, inspiring him to become a photographer. He moved to Paris where he met Henri Cartier-Bresson, Robert Capa, and David Seymour, the founders of Magnum Photos. By 1953 he was a member of the organization. His ability to capture fleeting moments in life through powerful compositions was already apparent, and this skill was to serve him well for decades to come.

Over the next several decades, Riboud traveled around the world. In 1957, he was one of the first European photographers to go to China, and in 1968, 1972, and 1976, Riboud made several reportages on North Vietnam. Later he traveled all over the world, but mostly in Asia, Africa, the U.S. and Japan. Riboud has been witness to the atrocities of war (photographing from both the Vietnam and the American sides of the Vietnam War), and the apparent degradation of a culture repressed from within (China during the years of chairman Mao Zedong's Cultural Revolution). In contrast, he has captured the graces of daily life, set in sun-drenched facets of the globe (Fès, Angkor, Acapulco, Niger, Bénarès, Shaanxi), and the lyricism of child's play in everyday Paris. In 1979 Riboud left the Magnum agency.

Riboud's photographs have appeared in numerous magazines, including Life, Géo, National Geographic, Paris Match, and Stern. He twice won the Overseas Press Club Award, received the Lifetime Achievement Award at the 2009 Sony World Photography Awards and has had major retrospective exhibitions at the Musée d'Art Moderne de la Ville de Paris and the International Center of Photography in New York.

Riboud was made an Honorary Fellow of the Royal Photographic Society in 1998.

== Photography ==
One of Riboud's best known images is Eiffel Tower Painter, taken in Paris in 1953. It depicts a man painting the tower, posed like a dancer, perched between the metal armature of the tower. Below him, Paris emerges from the photographic haze. Lone figures appear frequently in Riboud's images. In Ankara, a central figure is silhouetted against an industrial background, whereas in France, a man lies in a field. The vertical composition emphasizes the landscape, the trees, sky, water and blowing grass, all of which surround but do not overpower the human element.

An image taken by Riboud on 21 October 1967, entitled "The Ultimate Confrontation: The Flower and the Bayonet," is among the most celebrated anti-war pictures. Shot in Washington, D.C. where thousands of anti-war activists had gathered in front of the Pentagon to protest against America's involvement in Vietnam, the picture shows a young girl, Jan Rose Kasmir, with a flower in her hands and a kindly gaze in her eyes, standing in front of several rifle-wielding soldiers stationed to block the protesters. Riboud said of the photo, "She was just talking, trying to catch the eye of the soldiers, maybe trying to have a dialogue with them. I had the feeling the soldiers were more afraid of her than she was of the bayonets."

In contrast to the images in his photo essay, A Journey to North Vietnam (1969), Riboud says in the accompanying interview: "My impression is that the country's leaders will not allow the slightest relaxation of the population at large [...] it is almost as if [...] they are anxious to forestall the great unknown – peace." In the same Newsweek article, he expanded further in his observations on life in North Vietnam:

I was astonished, for example, at the decidedly gay atmosphere in Hanoi's Reunification Park on a Sunday afternoon [...] I honestly did not have the impression they were discussing socialism or the 'American aggressors' [...] I saw quite a few patriotic posters crudely 'improved' with erotic graffiti and sketches.

There is a divide between what is photographed (or published) and what Riboud had to say by way of his interview. Commenting on this in 1970, the author Geoffrey Wolff wrote:

Riboud's photographs illustrate the proposition. The French photographer has been to North Vietnam twice [...] and he is most friendly, on the evidence of his pictures, to the people and the institutions he found there. His photographs are of happy faces,[...] An Air Force ace illustrates how he shot the American "air pirates" from the sky [...] Who knows the truth about these places?

American, revolutionary political Rap Metal band, Rage Against the Machine used two of Riboud's photographs for their second single "Bullet in the Head". Both photographs carry strong political and social messages, but are very different. The front cover is a picture of American school children pledging allegiance to the 'flag' (Stars and Stripes) in a classroom; the back cover picture, is of a young (probably Vietnamese) boy, who is pointing a pistol, while soldiers stand on parade in the background. It is unclear who or what the boy is aiming at and whether the gun is real or a toy.

== Marriage and family ==
In 1961 Riboud married the American sculptor Barbara Chase, who was living in Paris. They had two children. She became well known for her novel, Sally Hemings (1979), which earned critical acclaim and became a bestseller. They divorced before 1981.

He later married Catherine Chaine, a journalist and author.

Riboud died in Paris on 30 August 2016, at the age of 93.

== Publications ==
- Women of Japan. Andre Deutch, 1959.
- Visions of China, Photographs 1957–1980. Pantheon Books, 1981. ISBN 978-0-394-74840-5
- Three Banners of China. Macmillan, 1966. ISBN 978-3-7611-0609-9
- Photographs at Home and Abroad. Abrams, 2000. ISBN 9780810915664
- Photo Poche 37: Marc Riboud ISBN 978-2867540509
- Marc Riboud: photos choisies 1953–1985. Paris: Musee d'art moderne de la ville de Paris, 1985. ISBN 978-2-85346-000-2
- Marc Riboud: l'embarras du choix
- Marc Riboud: Journal. by Claude Roy. New York: Harry N. Abrams, 1988. ISBN 978-0-8109-1566-4
- Marc Riboud in China: Forty Years of Photography New York: Harry N. Abrams, 1997. ISBN 978-0-8109-4430-5
- Marc Riboud: 50 Years of Photography by Annick Cojean. Flammarion, 2004. ISBN 978-2-08-030447-6
- Grands Travaux à Paris: 1981–1995 with Seloua Luste Boulbina and Alexis Riboud. France: La Dispute, 2007. ISBN 978-2-84303-147-2
- Le Bon Usage du monde by Claude Roy. France: Éditions Rencontre, 1963.
- Istanbul, 1950–2000. With Jean-Claude Guillebaut. France: Imprimerie Nationale, 2003. ISBN 978-2-7433-0446-1
- Huang Shan
- The Face of North Vietnam. With Philippe Devilliers. Holt, Rinehart, and Winston, 1970. ISBN 978-0-03-085325-8
- Chine: Instantanés de Voyage. France: Arthaud, 1980. ISBN 978-2-7003-0334-6
- Bangkok with William Warren. Weatherhill/Serasia, 1976. ISBN 9780834818507
- Angkor: The Serenity of Buddhism. London: Thames and Hudson, 1993. ISBN 978-0-500-54182-1
- Angkor: Sérénité bouddhique. France: Institut Geographique National, 1998. ISBN 978-2-11-081154-7
- A lasting moment: Marc Riboud photographs Leeds 1954 and 2004 (with Janet Douglas (historian), Anna Douglas, Caryl Phillips) (2008)

== Exhibitions ==
- 1958 Photographs From The Museum Collection (Museum of Modern Art, New York)
- 1959 30th Anniversary Special Installation – Towards the "New" Museum (Museum of Modern Art, New York)
- 1960 Photographs for Collectors (Museum of Modern Art, New York)
- 1963 Marc Riboud (The Art Institute, Chicago)
- 1964 Edward Steichen Photography Center (Museum of Modern Art, New York)
- 1966 China (Institute of Contemporary Art, London)
- 1967 China (The Photographers Gallery, London)
- 1974 Marc Riboud (The Photographers Gallery, London)
- 1975 Nord Vietnam (Rote Fabrik, Zurich)
- 1975 Against the Odds by Marc Riboud (International Center of Photography, NY)
- 1977 Marc Riboud (Galerie Municipale, Toulouse)
- 1978 Marc Riboud (Galerie Agathe Gaillard, Paris)
- 1981 From China & Elsewhere (Gallery Photograph, NY)
- 1981 China (The Photographers Gallery, London)
- 1982 China (Galerie Photo, Geneva)
- 1984 Hommage à Marc Riboud (Centre d'action culturelle and 'China' Galerie ACPA, Bordeaux)
- 1985 Rétrospective (Musée d'Art moderne de la Ville, Paris)
- 1988 Marc Riboud (Galerie Agathe Gaillard, Paris)
- 1988 Marc Riboud (International Center of Photography, NY)
- 1996 China, Travelling Exhibition (Centre National de Photographie, Paris – Barbican, London – International Center of Photography, NY)
- 2004 Rétrospective (Maison européenne de la Photographie, Paris)
- 2008 Les Inédits de Marc Riboud (Atelier Publimod, Paris)
- 2008 Home on the Road (Howard Greenburg, New York)
- 2009 Marc Riboud. L'Instinct de l'instant. 50 Years of Photography (Musée de la Vie romantique, Paris)
- 2009 China 1954–2004 (Month of Photography Asia, Singapore)
- 2010 Krishna Riboud's Garden (Musée des Arts asiatiques—Guimet, Paris)
- 2014 Portraits of the 20th Century (Peter Fetterman Gallery, Santa Monica)
- 2015 Marc Riboud (Salon Galic Croatian Association of Visual Artists, Croatia)
- 2018 The World of Marc Riboud (Leica Gallery Tokyo, Tokyo)

== Sources ==
- Miller, Russell (1999). Magnum: Fifty Years at the Front Line of History. Grove Press. ISBN 0802136532. ISBN 978-0-8021-3653-4.
- Morris, John; McNeill, William (2002). Get the Picture: A Personal History of Photojournalism. University of Chicago Press. ISBN 0226539148. ISBN 978-0-226-53914-0.
- Warren, Lynn (2006). Encyclopedia of twentieth-century photography. CRC Publishing. pp. 1338–1340. ISBN 0415976650. ISBN 978-0-415-97665-7.
