= Bernie Boston =

American photographer (1933–2008)

- Born: May 18, 1933; Washington DC, United States
- Died: January 22, 2008 (aged 74); Basye, Virginia, US
- Occupation: Photojournalist
- Notable credit: Pulitzer Prize-finalist ( × 2)

Bernie Boston (May 18, 1933 – January 22, 2008) was an American photographer most noted for his iconic Flower Power image.

== Life and career ==
Boston was born in Washington, D.C., and grew up in McLean, Virginia. During his time in high school he was a photographer for the newspaper and yearbook. He graduated from the Rochester Institute of Technology (RIT) in 1955. He was a member of the Gamma Phi local fraternity and RIT, and after it became a chapter of Sigma Pi fraternity he was inducted into the national organization. After his time at Rochester Institute of Technology, Boston studied at the United States Air Force School of Aviation Medicine. He served in the Army for two years while in Germany practicing radiology "in a neurosurgical unit."

In 1958, he left the Army and returned to Washington, working in custom photofinishing. He started his news photography career in Dayton, Ohio with the Dayton Daily News. He moved back to Washington to work at The Washington Star and was director of photography when the newspaper folded in 1981. He then was hired by the Los Angeles Times to establish a photo operation in the nation's capital.

Boston covered every president from Harry S. Truman to Bill Clinton. In 1967 he was commissioned to shoot a portrait of former Black Panther H. Rap Brown. Noticing the trend of a call for civil rights in the late 1960s, Boston took more images of the Civil Rights Movement, including a portrait of the Reverend Martin Luther King Jr. during his Poor People's Campaign, and other notable events. On October 22, 1967, he photographed his most famous picture, Flower Power, which showed a Vietnam War protester inserting flowers into National Guardsmen's rifle barrels.

He was a finalist for a Pulitzer Prize for a 1987 photograph of Coretta Scott King unveiling a bust of her late husband, the Rev. Martin Luther King Jr., in the U.S. Capitol.

Boston taught photojournalism classes at Northern Virginia Community College and Rochester Institute of Technology.

An archive of many of Boston's negatives as well as some prints and contact sheets is held at Rochester Institute of Technology. Established as a tribute to his memory and an inspiration for young photographers, it includes most of his work including the original negative for Flower Power.

Boston attributed his success to his knowledge of his equipment. In an age of film, he knew chemistry as well as the capabilities of his lenses. Boston also believed in dressing in a suit and tie. "I'm in the capital of the world and I don't believe you should walk into an office in jeans and a sweat-shirt. I think you should blend in."

== Awards ==
- 1987: Finalist, Pulitzer Prize for Breaking News Photography, Spot News Photography.
- 1993: Joseph A. Sprague Memorial Award from the National Press Photographers Association, their highest honor.
- Inducted into the Hall of Fame of Sigma Delta Chi, the Society of Professional Journalists.

== Publications ==
- Bernie Boston: American Photojournalist. Henrietta, New York: RIT Cary Graphic Arts, 2006. By Therese Mulligan. ISBN 978-1933360195.

== Death ==
Boston died at his home in Basye, Virginia, on January 22, 2008, of amyloidosis.
