= Richmond Chronicle (underground newspaper) =

Richmond Chronicle was an underground newspaper published in Richmond, Virginia. It had no connection to earlier papers published in Richmond bearing the same name. Launched in the summer of 1969 as the official publication of the Free University of Richmond, it was published semi-monthly, with Bruce Smith and Hilton Lee "Chip" Brooks Jr. as publishers. It survived until 1971, when it was rebooted as a weekly with a new vol. 1, no. 1 dated July 16, 1971 and Brooks as the sole publisher.

== See also ==
- List of underground newspapers of the 1960s counterculture
