= North Carolina Anvil =

The North Carolina Anvil (or simply The Anvil) was an alternative weekly newspaper, subtitled "a weekly newspaper of politics and the arts," published out of Durham, North Carolina from April 15, 1967 to August 11, 1983.

== Origins ==
The Anvil was begun by publisher Robert V. "Bob" Brown (June 10, 1933 – February 5, 2006), who had previously published a mimeographed civil rights newsletter, Chapel Hill Conscience, during 1963–1964, and the literary magazine Reflections from Chapel Hill, and award-winning poet and fiction writer Leon Rooke, who had been employed in the News Bureau of the University of North Carolina at Chapel Hill and had been the fiction editor for Reflections. Joel Bulkley, originally from Connecticut was also part of the founding group and often a source of critical financing. In 1969, Rooke left The Anvil, moving to Canada so that his wife, Constance "Connie" Raymond, could take a teaching position at the University of Victoria. Brown remained at the editorial helm for the remainder of The Anvil's run, retiring in 1983.

== Focus ==
Similar to other alt-weeklies or underground newspapers of the era, like The Berkeley Barb and The Village Voice, The North Carolina Anvil focused on arts and entertainment as well as reporting of local political, social, and economic issues for the area in and around The Triangle of North Carolina. Although its politics were comparatively moderate and it was unlike other underground papers in both style and content, The Anvil was a member of both the Underground Press Syndicate and the Liberation News Service. Its circulation in the mid-1970s was reported at 8000 copies.

== See also ==
- List of underground newspapers of the 1960s counterculture
