= Back Street Bugle =

Alternative newspaper published in England (1977–1981)

- Editor: Collectively edited
- Founded: November 1977
- Ceased publication: September 1981
- Political alignment: Libertarianism
- City: Oxford
- Country: England

The Back Street Bugle – Oxford's Other Paper was a libertarian and anarchist paper published in Oxford, England between 1977 and 1981. It mainly served the east of the city, providing an alternative view of the issues of the time, as well as listings of cultural events. It is probably best known for running a series of cartoon strips provided by the noted graphic novelist, Alan Moore.

== History ==
The Back Street Bugle was conceived at a meeting held in the Uhuru Café in Crowley Road in East Oxford. The first issue was published in November 1977 and was printed by Pauper's Press, a worker's cooperative. The paper had a countercultural approach and has been said by one of those involved to have been an attempt at an Oxford version of the International Times (it), a London-based underground newspaper with a hippie orientation. Those involved with its production were primarily young newcomers to Oxford and the readership consisted mainly of young people. One contributor who did not fit the mould was the English poet, writer and historian Audrey Beecham, who took part in the Spanish Civil War as an ambulance driver, and was a lifelong anarchist. She was the great-granddaughter of Thoman Beecham, who had become rich selling Beecham's Pills and the niece of the conductor, Sir Thomas Beecham.

The paper was initially prepared on the premises of the Pauper's Press but had to find a new location when the press closed down in May 1979. Initially, it came out fortnightly but this proved impossible to maintain and it changed to monthly at the end of 1978. Alan Moore's cartoon, St Pancras Panda, ran for thirteen irregular episodes from Issue 6 in February 1978 until Issue 25 in March 1979. The character and title were loosely based on Paddington Bear, both Paddington and St Pancras being leading railway stations in London. From Moore's arrival the paper's masthead featured a panda blowing a bugle, and this continued to be used after Moore ceased to provide cartoons.

The Bugle reflected the pre-occupations of the Left at that time: squatting, drugs, anti-racism, and the anti-nuclear weapons movement. There was also a strong ecological focus, with the partner to the Uhuru Café and the major distributor of the paper being Uhuru Foods, a wholefoods retailer. One of the paper's achievements was to "out" an undercover policeman whose job was to identify drug users in East Oxford.

== Policy differences ==
Unlike many other similar papers, the Back Street Bugle did credit articles to the writers, although most of these tended to use several pseudonyms, which both protected their identity and served to mask how few people were involved with writing. There were never many regular contributors. Policy was decided collectively at editorial meetings at the Uhuru Café. While there was often broad agreement on the approach to be taken, the topic of pornography proved very contentious, with a split emerging between those that believed that it should be allowed on freedom of expression grounds and others that saw it as oppressive. In the latter camp were the largely feminist operators of Uhuru Wholefoods who eventually removed all copies of the Bugle from their shelves and stopped allowing the paper to hold meetings in the café.

== Closure ==
The loss of a major retailer and of meeting space is likely to have been the main reason that the Bugle closed down in September 1981, after 55 issues, with the headline "Bugle folds – A Nation mourns". The panda still appeared on the masthead, although no longer blowing its bugle.

== Archive ==
Copies of the Back Street Bugle are held by the Oxfordshire History Centre.

== See also ==
- List of underground newspapers of the 1960s counterculture
