= From Out of Sherwood Forest =

United States underground newspaper

From Out of Sherwood Forest was a Southern California tabloid underground newspaper published biweekly in Newport Beach starting in November 1969. It was aimed mainly at students, teenagers and hippies, and was known for its inflammatory, take no prisoners rhetoric: "The American government was on trial for crimes against the world. We now find the government guilty and sentence it to death in the streets." In an article entitled "Outlaw Blues" and signed "Robbin' Hood" readers were encouraged to shoplift, making the argument, in an oversimplification of Marxist theory, that "profit is theft," hence all profit-making businesses were stealing from the public and it was not immoral for the people to steal back what was theirs.

Produced by a collective, the main editor and publisher was Don Elder, son of a Newport Beach city council member and co-owner of the Bird in the Cage (later Bird in Search of a Cage) bookstore, which opened in March 1969 on Balboa Boulevard, in a shopping strip near the surf in Newport Beach. Starting in November 1969 the paper was published by a "vaguely Marxist" collective out of the Bird in the Cage storefront. On Dec. 31, 1969, several weeks after the paper printed the article encouraging shoplifting, Don Elder was busted on 10 counts of conspiracy to solicit burglary and contributing to the delinquency of a minor, solely on the grounds that he was the editor of the paper and copies had allegedly fallen into the hands of minors. In July 1970 he was cleared of all charges. On Jan. 6, 1970, one week after the bust, the Bird in the Cage storefront was evicted from its Newport Beach location, ultimately relocating 10 miles north to Santa Ana.

== See also ==
- List of underground newspapers of the 1960s counterculture
