= Independent Eye =

The Independent Eye was an underground newspaper, founded in Yellow Springs, Ohio in February, 1968 by Alex Varrone with help from Jennifer Koster Varrone, his wife. The main purpose of the newspaper was to oppose the Vietnam war. The first four monthly issues were mimeographed pamphlets, and in June 1968 it became a broadsheet. HQ moved to Cincinnati in January 1969. First a monthly, later a biweekly, eventually a monthly (following an arson fire on Labor Day, 1970), it carried News of the war and of the war resistance movement. There were also some stories about the people and events of Cincinnati, Ohio and the surrounding area.

During the heyday of the Eye, as its devotees called it, leadership duties were shared by Alex Varrone, Jennifer Varrone, Monty Sher and Ellen Bierhorst Sher. Alex was founding editor and business manager; Monty helped with initial community organizing support. Ellen managed the make up and lay out team out of the Sher's home in Clifton, the John Uri Lloyd house. Frankie Gerson, later the founder of Cincinnati's Free Store, was the star newspaper peddler, selling more copies than anyone else on the streets Downtown.

The paper featured cartoon art by Ted Richards. The staff split and several members formed the Queen City Express, a newspaper that focused on younger readers.

The schism in the staff had to do with the issue of violence in the peace movement. One faction, led by Ted Richards, advocated that the paper call for "off the pigs" – in other words vilification of all law enforcement personnel. Horrified by this position, the Shers withdrew from participation in about 1971. The paper then moved to an apartment on Vine Street just south of McMillan.

After the Shers and, later, the Varrones had withdrawn, Michael Wood (brother of Northside Community leaders Maureen and Peggy Wood) took over leadership in the 70's.

Regular publication halted in 1974–1975. The Independent Eye began publication once again in 2005.

Ellen Bierhorst Sher donated a complete archive of the early years to the public library sometime in the 1990s.

A retrospective exhibition of the Independent Eye was held at the main branch of the Public Library of Cincinnati in November, 2019. A filmed panel discussion featured local artist Mark Neeley (who researched and curated the project), Ellen Bierhorst, Monty Sher, and Jim Tarbell. Around a dozen original Eye staff members and artists attended the event, including photographer Melvin Grier. Additionally, Neeley and the Public Library digitized the entire archive of Eye papers via their website's digital library. An Eye tribute publication titled Optic: a Visual Tribute to the Independent Eye was subsequently published, featuring 14 local artists paying tribute the original newspaper. Made possible by the Haile Foundation, copies of Optic were distributed at a variety of local business and museums.

== See also ==
- List of underground newspapers of the 1960s counterculture
