= Rebirth (newspaper) =

Hippie underground newspaper in Arizona (1968 to 1969)

July 28, 1969 Rebirth

Rebirth was a short-lived hippie underground newspaper in Phoenix, Arizona, which published nine biweekly and weekly issues between May 20, 1968, and August 1969. Published in tabloid format and featuring psychedelic graphics and underground comix, along with coverage of local and national news from a countercultural perspective, Rebirth was linked to the underground radio culture in Phoenix around radio stations KNIX, KRUX and KCAC, which were at the time offering a free-form FM progressive rock format.

Rebirth was published by Real Live People, Inc., a commune/collective which was also known as the Rebirth Tribe. Founders and contributors among a large and varied staff included publishers/managing editors Bruce Frank and John Cahal, editor Daniel Page, and art editor Joe Garneau.

== See also ==
- List of underground newspapers of the 1960s counterculture
