= Kudzu (newspaper) =

American counterculture underground newspaper

Cover of the June 24, 1969 issue

The Kudzu was a counterculture underground newspaper published in Jackson, Mississippi starting in September 1968. Promising "Subterranean News from the Heart of Ole Dixie" and offering a blend of hip culture and radical politics, it was founded by members of the Southern Student Organizing Committee (SSOC), a student activist group affiliated with SDS. Founding editors were Cassell Carpenter, David Doggett, and Everett Long, students at Millsaps College in Jackson. Despite harassment by police and city officials, it survived until May 1972.

Before launching Kudzu, David Doggett, who had been hired as a full-time organizer for Mississippi by SSOC, spent a month living in the Atlanta basement of The Great Speckled Bird learning the mechanics of underground newspaper production. The paper was biweekly, but due to publishing delays it generally came out about once every three weeks during its first year, and about once every 6 weeks thereafter. The papers were sold at Jackson high schools and colleges and in downtown Jackson, with additional distribution at colleges and other locations across Mississippi. Over the life of the paper, about 32 issues were published, with about 6,000 copies printed of each issue. Because the editors could not find an affordable printer in Jackson, Kudzu was forced to go to The Louisiana Weekly, a black newspaper in New Orleans, to get the paper printed. The paper had few advertisers and was financed mostly out of the pockets of the editors, who lost the small amount of financial support they were receiving from SSOC when that group disbanded in mid-1969.

== See also ==
- List of underground newspapers of the 1960s counterculture
