= If You Can't Live Without Me, Why Aren't You Dead Yet? =

If You Can't Live Without Me, Why Aren't You Dead Yet? may refer to:

- A 1986 book by Cynthia Heimel
- A 1998 single by My Life Story
- A 2009 song from the album Anywhere but Here by Mayday Parade
