= Nasumice =

Feature Film

- Directed by: Caleb Burdeau
- Written by: Caleb Burdeau
- Produced by: Swing the Hammer Films, Burning Peacock
- Starring: Moamer Kasumović, Marcello Prayer
- Cinematography: Caleb Burdeau
- Edited by: Caleb Burdeau
- Release date: August 10, 2018 (Sarajevo Film Festival)
- Running time: 83 minutes
- Countries: Italy, Bosnia Herzegovina
- Languages: Bosnian, Italian, English

Nasumice (English: Adrift) is a 2018 independent feature film directed by Caleb Burdeau. The film premiered in the BH Film program of the Sarajevo Film Festival in August 2018 and went on to win the Best Feature award at the 2019 Tripoli Film Festival.

== Plot ==
In 1994, during the Bosnian War, Elvis, a young man from Sarajevo, earns a living as a Polaroid street photographer among tourists in Venice and Rome. After his camera is stolen, he visits Rodolfo, an Italian he met by chance. Their quiet, uneasy bond unfolds amid the whitewashed towns and olive groves of Puglia as both men confront displacement and isolation."Nasumice (Adrift) – Film page". Filmitalia (Cinecittà). Cinecittà. 2018.

== Production ==
The project was developed while Burdeau was working at film.factory Sarajevo under the mentorship of Béla Tarr. Filming took place in Bosnia and in the Apulia region of Italy, with Burdeau also serving as cinematographer and editor.

== Release ==
Nasumice had its world premiere at the Sarajevo Film Festival in 2018. It was later distributed on Amazon Prime Video in Italy in January 2021. The film was screened at several international festivals, winning the Best Feature award at the 2019 Tripoli Film Festival.

== Reception ==
Critical reception to the film was mixed to positive:

- Film Threat praised its “melancholy portrayal of those set adrift by exile” and awarded it 8/10.
- UK Film Review described the film as “a stunningly directed exploration of isolation and displacement” with “gorgeous cinematography.”
- High on Films commended the film's visual ambition, calling it “visually stunning,” though noted it “never rises above its ideas.”
- Eugene Weekly observed that although the film is a “slow burn,” its “artistic direction and understated performances make for a worthwhile watch.”

== Awards ==
- Best Feature — Tripoli Film Festival (2019)
