= Melvin (film) =

- Directed by: Henry Weintraub
- Written by: Henry Weintraub
- Produced by: Henry Weintraub; Sara Weintraub
- Starring: Patrick O'Driscoll; Leif Fuller; Lilly Maher; Yonatan Schultz; Hudson Hongo; Ben Chinburg; Shane Cohn
- Cinematography: Leif Fuller
- Edited by: Henry Weintraub
- Music by: Cutshawkane
- Production company: 531 Productions
- Distributed by: 531 Productions
- Release date: 2009
- Running time: 63 minutes
- Country: United States
- Language: English

Melvin is a 2009 American zombie comedy film written and directed by Henry Weintraub, starring Patrick O'Driscoll, Leif Fuller, Lilly Maher, Yonatan Schultz, Hudson Hongo, Ben Chinburg and Shane Cohn.

== Cast ==
- Patrick O'Driscoll as Norton
- Leif Fuller as Melvin
- Lilly Maher as Wendy
- Yonatan Schultz as Trash
- Hudson Hongo as Knuckles
- Ben Chinburg as Spit
- Shane Cohn as Detective Getz
- Lloyd Kaufman as Charlie
- Kayla Hixson as Wanda
- Meredith Adelaide as Tammy
- Martin Brown as Professor Ford
- Jimmy Singleton as Sal
- Meghan Birr as Student
- Sara Weintraub as Sheila
- Dominick Pottker as Slug
- Polly Birr as Principal
- Andrew Hanna as Puke Guy
- Joey Stutz as Chuck
- Andy Larson as Groundskeeper

== Reception ==
Bill Gibron of DVD Talk rated the film 4 stars out of 5 and wrote that the film is "just inventive enough, irreverent enough, and irritating enough to make this critic grin from ear to guiltily pleasured ear." Rick Levin of Eugene Weekly described it as "unpretentious and ironic, oozing with updated nostalgia for the underground culture of the 1980s, and the pointedly lunkhead humor vibrates with an undercurrent of sharp social satire that is echoed in the oddly good-natured gore as well as the fantastic soundtrack, laid down by local bands at the time." Robert Gold of Horror DNA rated the film 3 stars out of 5 and wrote that it "brings fresh energy to the material and creates a sense of fun that is as infectious as a zombie plague." He praised the performances of Maher, Fuller and O'Driscoll.

Todd Martin of HorrorNews.net wrote that the film "tries to be a horror-comedy in the tradition of Troma and Speed Freak Productions films, but it fails at both attempts." Martin opined that the film "scary in the least and it is only mildly amusing", while it "tries too hard to be wacky and zany but instead it just comes off as silly." Steve Barton of Dread Central rated the film 0 stars out of 5 and wrote: "Sadly this film is a complete and utter mess. Zombie madness does eventually ensue, but it’s a grueling viewing experience to finally get there. Basic storytelling elements are nowhere to be found, as is anything remotely original, and it gives you a headache to try and figure out just what the hell is going on and when it’s going on."
