= Leviathan (newspaper) =

United States underground newspaper

Leviathan, Fall 1970

Leviathan was a New Left radical underground newspaper published in a tabloid newspaper format and distributed through the underground press network in the US in the years 1969-1970. Fairly serious in content with a focus on radical organizing issues, it was loosely aligned with the SDS movement. The first issue was dated March, 1969, with two editorial offices in New York, where Carol Brightman, Beverly Leman, and Kathy McAfee were listed on the first masthead, later to be joined by a number of others including Marge Piercy and Sol Yurick; and San Francisco, where the collective included Peter Booth Wiley, Carole Deutch, Danny Beagle, Matthew Steen, Bob Gavriner, Al Haber, Bruce Nelson, Todd Gitlin and David Wellman. Part of the inspiration for the paper was a desire to fill the gap created by the demise of the influential New Left organ Studies on the Left, and the core group included people from the antiwar newsletter Viet Report.

Responsibility for producing successive issues alternated between the San Francisco and New York offices. Initially planned to appear on a regular monthly schedule, by the end of the first year the publication schedule had cut back to 9 issues a year, appearing at roughly 6 week intervals. In San Francisco the paper occupied space at 330 Grove Street that it rented for $25 a month, in a building which also housed underground comics publisher Don Donahue, a group that produced rock concert light shows, the Black Writers Workshop, underground newspapers Dock of the Bay and The Movement, the San Francisco office of Liberation News Service, and other tenants; it later relocated into a new space at 968 Valencia Street. Due in part to factional stresses in the post-SDS Weatherman Underground era, the paper folded in late 1970 after a run of 13 issues, with its last issue dated vol. 2, no. 4, Fall 1970.

Notable articles that appeared in the paper during its run included Marge Piercy's "The Grand Coolie Damn", "You Do Need a Weatherman" by Shin'ya Ono, and an interview with Carlos Marighella shortly before his death.

== See also ==
- List of underground newspapers of the 1960s counterculture
