= Peninsula Observer =

United States underground newspaper (1968–1969)

- Midpeninsula Observer (Feb. 5-19, 1968)
- Type: Underground press bi-weekly
- Format: Tabloid
- Editor: rotating
- Founded: 1967
- Headquarters: Palo Alto, CA
- Circulation: 5,000
- Price: $0.15

The Peninsula Observer was an underground newspaper published in Palo Alto, California from July 7, 1967, to November 1969. Co-founded by Barry Greenberg and David Ransom, it was produced by Stanford undergraduate and graduate students opposed to the war in Vietnam, with community members and others. Circulation was about 5000 copies.

Early issues were published as the Midpeninsula Observer. It became the Peninsula Observer with the issue of August 12–26, 1968 (vol. 2, no. 4). Editorship rotated among a group including Greenberg and Ransom, Randy Bonner, Marlene Charyn, Peter Dollinger, David Shen, Maureen Kulbaitis, and Joanne Wallace. Published roughly biweekly for two years, it printed its last issue in November 1969.

Its articles attacking the Stanford Research Institute helped to bring about the severing of the university's ties with the Institute in 1970.

== See also ==
- List of underground newspapers of the 1960s counterculture
