= Kaleidoscope (newspaper) =

United States underground newspaper

Front page of vol.1, no.22 (1968)

Kaleidoscope was an underground newspaper that was published in Milwaukee, Wisconsin, US. Founded by John Kois, the radio disk jockey Bob Reitman, and John Sahli (a member of the Shag), it was published from October 6, 1967, to November 11, 1971, printing 105 biweekly issues. The paper's first issue was printed with a borrowed $250 in an edition of 3,500 copies, which sold out in two days.

In the first anniversary issue of Kaleidoscope a brief history of the paper's origins appeared:

The need for a Milwaukee-based underground newspaper was apparent early in 1967. It was talked about, tentative plans made and loose alliances formed, throughout the spring and summer, but nothing definite was done until July, when George Richard, a happy man of business, offered to underwrite the first issue. The first "staff" meeting was held in the Knickerbocker Coffee Shop. It was quite a crew: Bob Reitman, cemetery managing rock freak poet; John Sahli, industrial designing former gentle Shag; and John Kois, drifter free lance writer recently escaped from the coast.

From its first issue, Kaleidoscope was subject to censorship attempts, including arrest of vendors in some suburbs and a drive to put its printer out of business; one case went to the U.S. Supreme Court (after the newspaper had folded), which ruled in Kois v. Wisconsin that the newspaper's publication of two photos and a poem entitled "Sex Poem" in an article about censorship did not constitute obscenity. "One of the requirements to get on this paper," John Kois told a reporter for Rolling Stone, "is that you have to dig fucking and doping."

Kaleidoscope was an affiliate of the Liberation News Service (LNS) and Underground Press Syndicate (UPS). It succumbed after four years to a combination of financial pressures, internal factionalism and burn-out. The 1971 death of the printer Bill Schanen, who withstood a boycott of his printing business after he started printing the undergrounds on his presses, may also have been a factor in the paper's demise. Schanen's son continued to print the paper but refused to extend any more credit. With the paper $15,000 in debt to 42 creditors, and revenues sinking fast, it soon folded.

At various times, Kaleidoscope also published several sister papers around the upper Midwest: the Chicago Kaleidoscope (first issue dated November 22-December 5, 1968, later merged with the Chicago Seed), Omaha Kaleidoscope, Fox Valley Kaleidoscope (based in Oshkosh, Wisconsin) and the Madison Kaleidoscope. There was also a short-lived affiliate in Indianapolis. These papers shared a common printer (Bill Schanen in Port Washington, Wisconsin), and sold advertising space to national advertisers that ran in all the active papers of the chain. Each ran local and hard news in a front section which was combined with a shared second section edited in Milwaukee, containing less parochial material (mostly arts and culture) derived or reprinted from national and syndicated sources. This latter "Part II" was also sold to other underground newspapers to be used as a supplement to their local content. Advertising revenue from this source was greatly diminished starting in 1969 after the FBI allegedly pressured advertisers such as Columbia Records to stop running advertisements in the underground press, although some observers have also attributed the sharp falloff in record company advertising which was experienced by all of the underground press to the rise of specialized rock music papers like Rolling Stone.

Kaleidoscope also operated two peripheral businesses in Milwaukee: the Granfalloon coffeehouse and the Interabang bookstore at 1668 N. Warren Ave.

After Kaleidoscope ceased publication in late 1971 a number of staffers joined the Bugle-American. Kois ended up working for Al Goldstein's Screw magazine. Reitman continued to work as a radio personality in Milwaukee, where he was still on the radio one night a week in October 2020.

== See also ==
- List of underground newspapers of the 1960s counterculture
