= Willamette Bridge =

Newspaper in Portland, Oregon

Willamette Bridge was an underground newspaper published in Portland, Oregon from June 7, 1968, to June 24, 1971. In the spring of 1968, several groups of people in Portland were discussing starting an "underground" newspaper in Portland, similar to the Los Angeles Free Press or the Berkeley Barb. They were partially motivated by a frustration with the reporting in the mainstream press, which was still supporting the Vietnam war, opposing progressive movements like the United Farmworkers Union, and showed no understanding at all of the growing "Counterculture" and its music, dress and mores. On the other hand, they saw many things going on in the city that were positive, but isolated- Antiwar activity at Reed College, "Hippies" gathering around Lair Hill park, the progressive wing of the Democratic Party gathering strength, craft stores and head shops opening around town, local bands like The Great Pumpkin and The Portland Zoo giving concerts. A newspaper could bring these groups together and break the information monopoly of the daily papers.

After a few meetings, three of these groups joined forces and the Willamette Bridge was born. The people who started The Bridge (as it came to be known) didn't think of themselves as just "journalists", per se- but rather, as communicators, community organizers. They saw their role as spreading the word about what was happening in the city and the world, and hoping that just spreading that information would help change the community.

The first issue of The Willamette Bridge carried this statement of purpose:

- To provide a means by which Portland's various liberal groups can learn of each other's activities;
- To be a bridge between these groups and the city officials, businessmen, parents and general citizenry;
- To provide a platform from which controversial issues and topics can be discussed;
- To print news that the mainstream press ignores, either by accident or by design;
- To give another slant to news that we feel is being distorted.
- And, hopefully, to establish more understanding among all of the peoples of the city.

It continued "...We feel that opinions are not and cannot be confined to the editorial page, so we will not attempt to appear objective about material we have definite feelings about."

"The Bridge" was a member of the Underground Press Syndicate and the Liberation News Service. Printed in a tabloid format with 10-15 underpaid general purpose employees (some had specialties, but everybody did everything) operating more or less collectively, The Bridge appeared every other Friday, then every Friday. By the summer of 1969 it was printing and selling 15,000 copies a week, making The Willamette Bridge one of Oregon's largest papers. It was organized by Editors and staffers included Michael Wells, Jimmy Beller and Maurice Isserman.

The Bridge was the forum where Portland's emerging Women's, Gay Rights and Environmental movements found a voice and reached the public. It had connections to the Black Panthers, Draft Resistance groups and other radical organizations. On the other hand, the Bridge advocated for saving The Old Church and converting a downtown parking lot into a park, which was realized in 1984 as Pioneer Courthouse Square

Michael Wells, the paper's founder and main editor, left in 1970, and it was taken over by a collective from members of Reed College SDS and its spinoff, the Portland Revolutionary Youth Movement collective. which put a greater emphasis on what they saw as radical politics. The paper shut down a year later. After the "Bridge" ended its run as Portland's local underground paper in 1971 it was succeeded by the Portland Scribe.

== See also ==
- List of underground newspapers of the 1960s counterculture
