= List of underground newspapers of the 1960s counterculture =

This is a partial list of the local underground newspapers launched during the Sixties era of the hippie/psychedelic/youth/counterculture/New Left/antiwar movements, approximately 1965–1973. This list includes periodically appearing papers of general countercultural interest printed in a newspaper format, and specific to a particular locale.

== Australia ==
- Sydney FTA, Sydney, 1970

== Belgium ==
- Amenophis, Brussels, 1965–1975
- Real Free Press, Antwerp

== Canada ==
=== Alberta ===
- Canada Goose, Edmonton

=== British Columbia ===
- The Georgia Straight, Vancouver

=== Manitoba ===
- The Lovin' Couch Press, Winnipeg
- Ǒmṕhalǒs, Winnipeg

=== Ontario ===
- Harbinger, Toronto
- Octopus, Ottawa (later Ottawa's Free Press)

=== Quebec ===
- Pop-See-Cul, Montreal, 1967–1968
- Mainmise, Montreal, 1970–1978

== France ==
- Actuel, Paris
- Interluttes, Paris

== India ==
- Hungry Generation weekly bulletins, Calcutta (1961–1965)
- Krittibas

== Italy ==
- Fuori!
- Re Nudo
- Tampax

== United Kingdom ==
- Back Street Bugle
- Black Dwarf
- Brighton Voice
- Contact
- Friends (later Frendz)
- Gandalf's Garden
- Ink
- International Times (also IT)
- Islington Gutter Press
- Leeds Other Paper
- Mole Express
- Oz

== United States ==
=== Alabama ===
- Exponent, University of Alabama in Huntsville, 1969–present
- High gauge, Tuscaloosa
- Rearguard, Mobile, 1971

=== Arizona ===
- Bandersnatch, Tempe, 1968–1969
- Butterfield Express, Tucson
- Druid Free Press, Tempe, 1969
- Gambit, Tempe, 1968
- Rebirth, Phoenix, 1969
- Resurrection, Tucson, 1970

=== California ===
- Alto, Isla Vista, 1967–1969
- Berkeley Barb, Berkeley, 1965–1980
- Berkeley Tribe, Berkeley, 1969–1972 (split from the Berkeley Barb after staff went on strike)
- The Black Panther, Oakland
- Bullsheet, Pasadena, 1969–1974
- Dock of the Bay, San Francisco
- Free Spaghetti Dinner, Santa Cruz
- From Out of Sherwood Forest, Newport Beach
- Good Times, San Francisco, 1969–1972 (formerly San Francisco Express-Times)
- Haight Ashbury Free Press, San Francisco
- Haight Ashbury Tribune, San Francisco (at least 16 issues)
- Illustrated Paper, Mendocino, 1966–1967
- Leviathan, San Francisco, 1969–1970
- Long Beach Free Press, Long Beach, 1969–1970
- Los Angeles Free Press, Los Angeles, 1964–1978 (new series 2005–present)
- Los Angeles Staff, Los Angeles (splintered from Los Angeles Free Press)
- Los Angeles Underground, Los Angeles, first issue published April 1, 1967 by Al & Barbara (Dolores) Mitchell
- Northcoast Ripsaw, Eureka
- OB Rag, Ocean Beach, 1970–1975 (new series 2001–2003, blog 2007–present)
- Open City, Los Angeles, 1967–1969
- Oracle of Southern California, Los Angeles
- The Organ, Fresno, 1968
- The Organ, San Francisco, 1970–1971
- Peninsula Observer, Palo Alto
- The San Diego Door, San Diego, 1966–1970 (formerly Good Morning, Teaspoon)
- San Diego Free Press, San Diego 1968–1970 (changed name to San Diego Street Journal)
- San Francisco Express Times, San Francisco, 1968–1969 (changed name to Good Times)
- San Francisco Oracle, San Francisco, 1966–1968
- San Jose Maverick, San Jose
- San Jose Red Eye, San Jose
- Seventy-Nine Cent Spread, Carmel
- Stockton Silver Hammer, Stockton
- SunDance, San Francisco, 1972
- Tuesday's Child, Los Angeles, 1969–1970

=== Colorado ===
- Aboveground, Colorado Springs, 1969–1970
- Blue Screw, Aurora, 1973–1974
- Chinook, Denver, 1969–1972
- El Gallo, Denver, 1967–1975
- Mountain Free Press, Denver, 1968–1970

=== Connecticut ===
- Hartford's Other Voice, Hartford
- Storrs Weekly Reader, Storrs, 1971–1973
- View from the Bottom, New Haven

=== Delaware ===
- Heterodoxical Voice, Newark

=== District of Columbia ===
- Colonial Times, 1971–1972
- The Daily Rag, 1972
- Quicksilver Times, 1969–1972
- Washington Free Press

=== Florida ===
- Amazing Grace, Tallahassee
- Aquarian, Temple Terrace, 1969
- Balaklava, Sarasota
- Bay Area Free Press, Tampa, 1970
- Both Sides Now, Jacksonville, 1969–1975
- Daily Planet, Miami (formerly Miami Free Press)
- Gulf Coast Fish Cheer, Pensacola
- Iconoclast, Pensacola, Florida, 1971–1974
- The Monocle, Tampa
- Ragweed, St. Petersburg

=== Georgia ===
- Albion's Voice, Savannah
- The Great Speckled Bird, Atlanta, 1968–1976

=== Illinois ===
- The Angry Voice, Greenville, 1969–1970
- Big Muddy Gazette, Carbondale, 1969–1972
- The Bridge, Chicago, 1967–1968
- Chicago Seed, Chicago, 1967–1973
- Chicago Kaleidoscope, Chicago
- Curb: Dedicated to Curbing Armed Problem Solving and Solving People Problems, Elmhurst, 1970–1973
- A Four Year Bummer, Champaign, 1969–1970
- News from Nowhere, DeKalb
- Rising Up Angry, Chicago, 1969–1975
- Second City, Chicago
- The Walrus, University of Illinois, Champaign-Urbana, 1968–1973
- "The Lincoln Park Press*", Chicago

=== Indiana ===
- Bauls of the Brickyard, West Lafayette, 1969
- Grinding Stone, Terre Haute
- Indianapolis Free Press, Indianapolis, 1969–1970
- The Only Alternative, Muncie, 1968–1971
- The Spectator, Bloomington, 1966–1971

=== Iowa ===
- Middle Earth, Iowa City, 1967–1968
- Pterodactyl, Grinnell

=== Kansas ===
- Alchemist, Manhattan, 1968–1969
- Custer's Last Stand, Manhattan, 1971
- Vortex, Lawrence

=== Kentucky ===
- Blue-tail fly, Lexington
- Callallo #20, Lexington
- Free Press of Louisville, Louisville

=== Louisiana ===
- In Arcane Logos, New Orleans, 1969
- NOLA Express, New Orleans
- The Ungarbled Word, New Orleans

=== Maryland ===
- Baltimore Free Press, Baltimore, 1968
- Dragon Seed, Baltimore, 1972
- Harry, Baltimore, 1969–1970
- The Pawn, Fort Detrick, 1969–1970

=== Massachusetts ===
- Avatar, Boston, 1967–1968
- Boston Free Press, Boston
- Boston Phoenix
- East Boston Community News, 1970-1989 Footnote links to Northeastern University Library's archive of all editions
- The Free Press of Springfield, Springfield (became Common Sense in 1969)
- Mother of Voices, Amherst
- Old Mole, Cambridge
- Thursday, Cambridge
- Worcester Phoenix
- Worcester Punch, Worcester
- Zig zag, Montague

=== Michigan ===
- Ann Arbor Argus, Ann Arbor, 1969–1971
- Ann Arbor Sun, Ann Arbor, 1971–1976
- Fifth Estate, Detroit, 1965–present
- god mother and apple pie/Up Against the Wall Street Journal, Saginaw, 1969–1971
- The Paper, East Lansing
- South End, East Lansing

=== Minnesota ===
- The Freeway, Duluth, 1971
- Hundred Flowers, Minneapolis, 1970–1972
- Minneapolis Flag, Minneapolis, 1969
- Hair, Minneapolis, 1969-1970.

=== Mississippi ===
- Creem, Birmingham
- Kudzu, Jackson, 1968–1972

=== Missouri ===
- Daily Flash, St. Louis (changed name to Xanadu)
- The New Hard Times, (St. Louis, 1968–1970
- The Outlaw, St. Louis, 1970–1973

=== Montana ===
- Borrowed Times, Missoula, 1972–1980

=== Nebraska ===
- Buffalo Chip, Omaha (started December 1967)
- Omaha Kaleidoscope, Omaha

=== Nevada ===
- Las Vegas Free Press, Las Vegas
- Love, Reno

=== New Jersey ===
- Abas, Newark, 1968–1969
- All You Can Eat, New Brunswick, 1970–1973

=== New Mexico ===
- Astral Projection, Albuquerque
- Caliche County Rendering Works, Albuquerque, 1968–1970
- The Fountain of Light, Taos, 1968–1970
- The Hips Voice, Santa Fe

=== New York ===
- Buffalo Insighter, Buffalo, 1967–1968
- East Village Other, New York City, 1965–1972
- Edge City, Syracuse, 1970–1971
- New York Ace, New York City, 1971–1972
- New York Avatar, New York City
- New York Free Press, New York City
- Other Scenes (dispatched from various locations around the world)
- Rat Subterranean News, New York City, 1968–1970 (later Women's LibeRATion)
- Space, Binghamton, 1972 (formerly Lost in Space)

=== North Carolina ===
- The Anvil, Durham, 1967–1983
- The Inquisition, Charlotte, 1968-1969
- Protean Radish, Chapel Hill

=== Ohio ===
- Angry City Press, Cleveland, 1970
- Aquarius, Dayton
- The Big Us, Cleveland, 1968–1970 (changed name to Burning River News)
- Columbus Free Press, Columbus, 1969–present
- Cuyahoga Current, Cleveland, Ohio, 1972-
- Great Swamp Erie Da Da Boom, Cleveland, 1970–1972
- Hash, Warren, 1970–1972
- Independent Eye, Cincinnati
- New Age, Athens
- Queen City Express, Cincinnati
- Razzberry Radicle, Dayton
- Minority Report, Dayton

=== Oklahoma ===
- Home Cookin, Oklahoma City
- Jones Family Grandchildren, Norman
- Jones Family Grandchildren II, Stillwater
- Osmosis, Tulsa, 1972

=== Oregon ===
- Eugene Augur, Eugene, 1969–1972
- Willamette Bridge, Portland, 1968–1971

=== Pennsylvania ===
- Common Sense, Philadelphia, published by Philadelphia Resistance, 1969–1974
- Distant Drummer, Philadelphia, 1970–1979 (changed name to The Drummer)
- Philadelphia Free Press, Philadelphia, 1968–1972
- Pittsburgh Fair Witness, Pittsburgh, 1970–1973 (changed name from Grok)
- Plain Dealer, Philadelphia
- Water Tunnel, State College
- Yarrowstalks, Philadelphia

=== Rhode Island ===
- Extra!, Providence

=== Tennessee ===
- Root, Memphis, 1969
- The Hinterlands, Knoxville, 1966

=== Texas ===
- Dallas Notes, Dallas, 1967–1970 (originally Notes from the Underground)
- The Eagle bone whistle, San Antonio
- The Rag, Austin, 1966–1977
- San Antonio Gazette, San Antonio, 1971–1975
- Space City, Houston, 1969–1972 (originally Space City News)

=== Utah ===
- Electric Newspaper, Salt Lake City, 1968 (at least 5 issues)
- Utah Free Press, Salt Lake City, 1966–1969

=== Vermont ===
- The first issue, Plainfield
- Windham Free Press, Putney

=== Virginia ===
- Alice: Blacksburg Free Press, Blacksburg
- The Liberated Castle, Fort Belvoir, 1971
- Richmond Chronicle, Richmond

=== Washington ===
- Helix, Seattle, 1967–1970
- Northwest Passage, Bellingham, 1969–1986
- Sabot, Seattle, 1970–1971
- Spokane Natural, Spokane, 1967–1970
- The Avatar, Olympia, 1967-1969?

=== West Virginia ===
- Buffalo Chips, Huntington
- Liberator, Morgantown, 1969–1971? (later Mountain Liberator)

=== Wisconsin ===
- Bugle-American, Milwaukee, 1970–1978
- The Caravan, Milwaukee, 1967–1971
- Connections, Madison, 1967–1969
- Counterpoint, Stevens Point
- Fox Valley Kaleidoscope, Oshkosh, 1970
- Kaleidoscope, Milwaukee, 1967–1971
- Madison Kaleidoscope, Madison
- Mega Middle Myth, Beloit, 1968
- Off the Pigs!, Madison, 1970's (affiliated with The People's Office)
- The People's Dreadnaught, Beloit
- What's Left, Milwaukee, 1970's

== See also ==
- Counterculture of the 1960s
- GI Underground Press
- Liberation News Service
- Underground Press Syndicate
