= Harry (newspaper) =

Underground biweekly newspaper in Baltimore, Maryland from 1969 to 1972

Harry was an underground newspaper founded and edited by Michael Weiss, Doug Wanken, Michael Carliner and Tom D'Antoni and published biweekly in Baltimore, Maryland from 1969 to 1972. A total of at least 41 issues were published, with an average circulation of 6,000 to 8,000 copies. P. J. O'Rourke, then a student at Johns Hopkins University, was a regular contributor and one of its editors. The publication was named by Michael Weiss's son after his grandfather. 'Harry' seemed an appropriate verb for the paper's mission.

The newspaper published in a 20-page black and white tabloid format, with news in front, followed by cultural features and a community calendar. Harry's slogan, just below its flag, declared its mission: "Serving the Baltimore Underground Community". Many of the staff lived in a Baltimore row house commune called "Harry." There was also an annex called "Harry's Aunt" down the block.

Twenty years after the newspaper stopped publishing, publisher Thomas V. D'Antoni tried to restart Harry as a monthly publication in 1991. His first issue was expected to be 32 pages long, with eight pages of reprints from the original Harry, including some of O'Rourke's articles.

== See also ==
- List of underground newspapers of the 1960s counterculture
