= Washington Free Press =

Underground newspaper

Feb. 1-14, 1969 issue of Washington Free Press

The Washington Free Press was a biweekly radical underground newspaper published in Washington, DC, beginning in 1966, when it was founded by representatives of the five colleges in Washington as a community paper for local Movement people. It was an early member of the Underground Press Syndicate. Starting in December, 1967 they shared a three-story house in northwest Washington with the Liberation News Service, the Washington Draft Resistance Union, and a local chapter of the anti-draft group Resistance. A print shop was in the basement, and other activist groups used the space and got their mail there. The paper's original founders and editors included Michael Grossman, Arthur Grosman and former State Department computer programmer William Blum, but the staff went through many changes and by 1969 nobody on the paper was even acquainted with any of the original founders.

The paper opposed the war in Vietnam and tended to follow the politics of SDS. Washington Free Press reporters insisted on their place in the Washington press corps and demanded entry to briefings and other press events until they were admitted. Topics covered in the paper included the antiwar movement, welfare, police brutality, campus activism at the five colleges in the area, drugs, abortion, and the youth culture. In 1969 it had a reported circulation of 23,000 copies.

A column containing reviews of illicit drugs was written by Pete Novick (born c.1948) under the pseudonym Fooman Zybar. Some of Novick's articles would contain usage safety and criticism of government policies.

== See also ==
- List of underground newspapers of the 1960s counterculture
