= Old Mole =

Underground newspaper published in Cambridge, Massachusetts, 1968–1970

Old Mole No. 25 (1969)

Old Mole was a radical New Left oriented underground newspaper published in Cambridge, Massachusetts from September 1968 to September 1970. Old Mole was continued by a second volume titled The Mole, which published five issues from November 1970 to April 1971. Printed biweekly in a 16-page tabloid format, Old Mole was based for most of its existence in a storefront and basement office on Brookline Street in Central Square. Selling for 15 cents (later raised to a quarter), 47 issues were published in all, with press runs averaging 8,000–10,000 copies. Subscriptions were free to prisoners and soldiers.

Old Mole was produced by a floating staff of 20 to 30 volunteers, with no more than four paid staffers. The staff was split evenly between men and women, almost all white, most of them college graduates and many connected with nearby Harvard University. About half of the paper's news coverage was local. One of its founders was Michael Ansara '68. It was more politically oriented than many of the more hippie, psychedelically oriented underground papers of the period, and its politics tended to reflect the positions of the Students for a Democratic Society chapter at Harvard, supporting the Harvard student strike in 1969.

The paper's name was taken from a quotation from Karl Marx, which appeared in the masthead: "We recognize our old friend, our old mole, who knows so well how to work underground, suddenly to appear: the revolution."

During the Harvard student strike of 1969, the Old Mole published daily "Strike Specials". In one of them, it published internal correspondence of Harvard administrators (the "Dear Nate" letter) that had apparently been stolen from University Hall during the student sit-in.

== See also ==
- List of underground newspapers of the 1960s counterculture
