= Chinook (newspaper) =

Underground newspaper in Denver, Colorado, US (1969-1972)

- Cover of vol. 2, no. 30 (August 13, 1970)
- Type: Underground press weekly
- Format: Tabloid
- Founded: 1969
- Ceased publication: 1972
- Headquarters: Denver, Colorado

Chinook was a counterculture underground newspaper published weekly in Denver, Colorado, from August 21, 1969, to January 21, 1972. It was a member of the Underground Press Syndicate. A total of 117 issues were printed. In 1972 it merged with Boulder magazine to become The Straight Creek Journal, which considered itself an alternative press rather than an underground press publication, publishing weekly from February 10, 1972, to August 7, 1980. According to Abe Peck in his memoir Uncovering the Sixties, the original underground Chinook started to fall apart after a number of staffers left to become followers of Guru Maharaj Ji, who visited Denver and established a mission there in late 1971.

Chinook Calendar page, April 23, 1970, showing typical events and community interests of an underground paper of this period (Click to expand)

From Chinook, Vol 3, No 18, Issue 83: Staff: Patrick Dolan (editor), Kevin Tannenbaum (managing editor), John Loquidis (music), Milton Tea (music), Cosmic Joe (news, calendar). Steve Levince (City), Mike Wheelock and Lini Lieberman (food), Paul Salazar (astrologer), Swami Sivanand (swami), Dan Yurman (housing) Carl Stone, photography).

Other Contributors to Chinook included Chip Berlet.

The last issue published was on Valentines Day 1972. The folded (half-tabloid) back cover was by artist John Fish. The open tabloid full front page was by artist Layne Catherine Anderson.

== See also ==
- List of underground newspapers of the 1960s counterculture
