= Middle Earth (newspaper) =

Underground newspaper

Middle Earth was an underground newspaper published biweekly in Iowa City, Iowa from 1967 to 1968, and edited by David Miller. It hosted the June, 1967 conference of the Underground Press Syndicate, which brought together 80 editors of underground newspapers from around the US and Canada. Miller and his wife Alice, who had been producing the newspaper in a converted one-room schoolhouse 5 miles out of town, left in 1968, and bequeathed the paper to the local chapter of Students for a Democratic Society (SDS) at the University of Iowa. SDS managed to keep the paper going until November 1968, when factional disputes inside the chapter and disagreements with the teenaged editor led to an attempted takeover by local members of the Progressive Labor (PL) faction in SDS, which was foiled when the editor left town with the paper's funds. The paper folded after this incident.

== See also ==
- List of underground newspapers of the 1960s counterculture
