= Spokane Natural =

United States underground newspaper (1967–1970)

- Cover of the Nov. 22, 1968 issue of Spokane Natural. Artwork by Steve Kensok.
- Type: Semiweekly newspaper
- Owner(s): Underground Press Syndicate; Liberation News Service
- Publisher: Mandala Printshop
- Editor: Russ Nobbs
- Founded: 1967
- Ceased publication: 1970
- Headquarters: Spokane, Washington
- Circulation: 3000 (approx.)
- OCLC number: 1766355

Spokane Natural was an underground newspaper published biweekly in Spokane, Washington from May 5, 1967, to November 13, 1970, by the Mandala Printshop, and edited by Russ Nobbs. It belonged to the Underground Press Syndicate and the Liberation News Service. The first issue was produced out of a converted barbershop storefront cum bookstore and hangout called the "Hippie Mission" on a cul-de-sac in Spokane, where Russ Nobbs and a visiting friend from the SF Bay area, Ormond Otvos wrote and produced the first 8-page issue on a hand-cranked Spirit duplicator. After several issues of pale blue "Ditto" print on white paper, The Natural moved to colored papers and occasionally colored ink with a Gestetner Mimeograph duplicator. Ultimately, the newspaper was printed on newsprint by sheet fed or web presses by various printers in Spokane, Seattle and Davenport, WA.

Part of the Spokane community was hostile and the storefront's windows were broken or shot out several times.

One early contributor, George (Martin) Maloney Jr, replaced Ormond Otvos as co-editor and later edited the arts oriented Second Section of the Natural. Many local teenagers and college students helped with writing and street distribution/sales, leading to clashes with police and ACLU supported free speech efforts. The paper published "Letters from Jail" by catherine yronwode, who, along with 15 other people, had been arrested at nearby Tolstoy Peace Farm for growing marijuana. The staff and locals also served as a casual debriefing point for Vietnam war veterans, due to the paper's strong pacifist editorial bent.

The original intent of the paper was to bring news of the Summer of Love and opening of the culture taking place "on the coasts", and eventually the paper's circulation grew to about 3000 copies. By late 1970 Nobbs gave the paper away to local people who changed the paper's name to the Provincial Press, keeping it alive under that title until May 1972. As the Provincial Press it began to focus on gay issues, becoming Spokane's first gay paper. Never achieving much of a national profile, the Natural was a lively but isolated outpost of the hippie counterculture in eastern Washington State.

In 2010 Nobbs gave his full set of copies, photographic negatives, paste-ups and the original hand-cranked Gestetner mimeograph to the Eastern Washington Historical Society for their research library located on the grounds of the Northwest Museum of Arts and Culture.

== See also ==
- List of underground newspapers of the 1960s counterculture
