= The Big Us =

Newspaper

The Big Us was a radical underground newspaper published in Cleveland, Ohio starting in September, 1968, appearing biweekly in tabloid format. Its politics reflected the views of SDS. Editors were Carol Cohen McEldowney, a 25-year-old SDS organizer and Cleveland welfare caseworker, and Carole Close, an antiwar activist. The paper's headquarters were in a church coffeehouse/youth center called The Outpost, near the Case Western Reserve University campus. McEldowney left in May 1969 to work in an antiwar GI coffeehouse in South Carolina, and starting with the issue of Oct. 14, 1969 (vol. 3, no. 2) the paper changed its name to Burning River News, commemorating a famous incident in which the toxic waste on the surface of the Cuyahoga River in downtown Cleveland caught fire.

In 1970, it merged with the Buddhist Third-Class Junkmail Oracle founded by Cleveland poet d. a. levy to become the Burning River Oracle, and restarted its volume numbering to volume 1, number 1 with the March 3–17, 1970 issue. Starting with the April 15–28 issue it changed names again to simply Burning River, under which title it published its last few issues, ending with vol. 1, no. 8 or 9 in July 1970.

The Big Us was a member of both the Underground Press Syndicate and the Liberation News Service. Contributors included local underground cartoonists Dave Sheridan and Fred Schrier.

== See also ==
- List of underground newspapers of the 1960s counterculture
