= Omaha Kaleidoscope =

United States underground newspaper

Omaha Kaleidoscope was a brief-lived countercultural, antiwar underground newspaper published in Omaha, Nebraska in 1971. Edited by Tim Andrews and published monthly (later biweekly) in a tabloid format, it was part of the small Kaleidoscope chain of underground newspapers based in Milwaukee, Wisconsin. The first issue was dated Feb. 10, 1971.

== See also ==
- List of underground newspapers of the 1960s counterculture
