= Dallas Notes =

American underground newspaper, 1967–1970

Oct. 23–Nov. 5 1970 issue

Dallas Notes was a biweekly underground newspaper published in Dallas, Texas from 1967 to 1970, and edited by Stoney Burns (penname of Brent Lasalle Stein; 1942–2011), whose father owned a printing company in Dallas. Initially founded by Doug Baker at Southern Methodist University in March 1967, under the title NOTES from the Underground, the first issues were run off after hours on a copy machine at Texas Instruments.

== History ==
With a blend of New Left political activism, hippie/drug counterculture, and underground comix and graphics, the paper developed a growing citywide and regional readership, and starting with Vol. 1, No. 26 (Feb. 16-29, 1968) the paper changed its banner to Dallas Notes and is sometimes confused with the competing weekly publication published by Doug Baker, first called "Dallas News", later, when the U.S. Post Office delivered their mail to "The Dallas Morning News" and the big morning paper's mail to them, Baker renamed it "The Iconoclast". Eventually circulation peaked at 20,000 copies after Stoney Burns quit. Roy Appleton wrote in The Dallas Morning News that Dallas Notes "covered the local scene — from music and drug arrests to demonstrations and the men in blue." He reported that the paper "decried war, intolerance and hypocrisy with a playful aggression and a cutting edge."

The paper's 85-issue run came to an end with the issue of Sept. 16-30, 1970. It was subsequently revived and carried forward under the name H.O.O.K.A. (The Humanitarian Order of Kosmic Awareness, organized as a church, whose purpose was the overthrow of the U.S. Government). When Stoney Burns left, citing he'd "dropped acid and flipped out three times, but only came back twice," he introduced J.R. Compton to the staff as the new editor and publisher, from late 1970 to 1972.

During its existence Dallas Notes was subjected to repeated police raids and harassment. Thorne Dreyer wrote at The Rag Blog that Notes editor Burns "was incessantly harassed by the Dallas authorities, who charged him with obscenity, beat him mercilessly, tore up his offices, and confiscated his equipment." Burns later learned that many of the office tear-ups and equipment thefts were carried out by his father and his father's trusted assistant.

The obscenity case against the paper "went all the way to the U.S. Supreme Court where Justice William O. Douglas commented on the cops' ransacking of the Dallas Notes offices: 'It would be difficult to find in our books a more lawless search-and-destroy raid.'"

In a widely publicized case former editor Burns was sentenced to prison in 1972 for 10 years and a day for possession of marijuana, but the sentence was commuted by Texas Governor Dolph Briscoe. Time magazine reported that, "The law in Dallas, from all appearances, had been bent on getting Stoney Burns for years."

In his book, Unamerican Activities: The Campaign Against the Underground Press, Geoffrey Rips wrote that the "persistent persecution of Burns stemmed in part from [his] 1967 investigative report in Dallas Notes about Texas Congressman Joe Pool's arrest for drunken driving, after his car hit a carload of soldiers at a red light." Pool was released and the arrest records destroyed, and the story was ignored by the Dallas daily newspapers. Pool, who was a member of the House Un-American Activities Committee, called for an investigation of the underground papers.

In October 1972, Burns, founded Buddy magazine, a free bi-monthly named after Buddy Holly that covered, among other things, the rock-n-roll and blues scene in North Texas.

== Library access ==
- Dallas Notes – "Serving the proletariat since 1967," Notes from the Underground, Inc.; OCLC 14584184, 1049750530, 917535901
- Notes From the Underground; OCLC 869478328
- Notes on Pot; OCLC 8227105
- Hooka (Humanitarian Order of Kosmic Awareness); OCLC 14094691
- Hooka Notes (Humanitarian Order of Kosmic Awareness); OCLC 974432136
- Instant Karma (Humanitarian Order of Kosmic Awareness, Publishers of Hooka); OCLC 900010644

== See also ==
- List of underground newspapers of the 1960s counterculture
