= Leeds Other Paper =

Alternative newspaper published in England (1974–1994)

- Owner: Cooperatively owned
- Editor: Edited by a collective
- Founded: 20 January 1974
- Ceased publication: 20 January 1994
- Political alignment: Anarchism; socialism
- City: Leeds, West Yorkshire
- Country: England
- Circulation: 2000+

The Leeds Other Paper (LOP) was an alternative or underground newspaper published from 1974 to 1994 in Leeds, West Yorkshire, England. It was known as the Northern Star from 1991. Arguably the most active of the small, collectively produced local papers in England that played an important role in radical politics from the late 1960s, it was initially sold monthly, then fortnightly and, from 1980, weekly. It closed exactly twenty years after the first issue was published, after having produced 820 issues.

== Context ==
The paper was started at a time of considerable conflict between the British working class and the British government. During 1973 and 1974 Edward Heath's Conservative government implemented the Three-Day Week as one of several measures introduced to ration electricity, the generation of which was severely restricted owing to industrial action by coal miners, many of whom came from the Leeds area.

LOP thus did not occur in a vacuum, but from a perceived need to document marginalized voices and report on subjects missing from the mainstream press. It was prompted by what it saw as the failure of that media to reflect the struggles of working-class people, such as the miners on strike. Also, shortly after its establishment, the Yorkshire Ripper killings began in which Peter Sutcliffe murdered 13 women in the area between 1975 and 1980. Women's rights activists were upset with the poor coverage of women's safety issues by the traditional media. Others in the community were also concerned by what they saw as the frequent hostility of the established media in Leeds to the good work being done by community organizers.

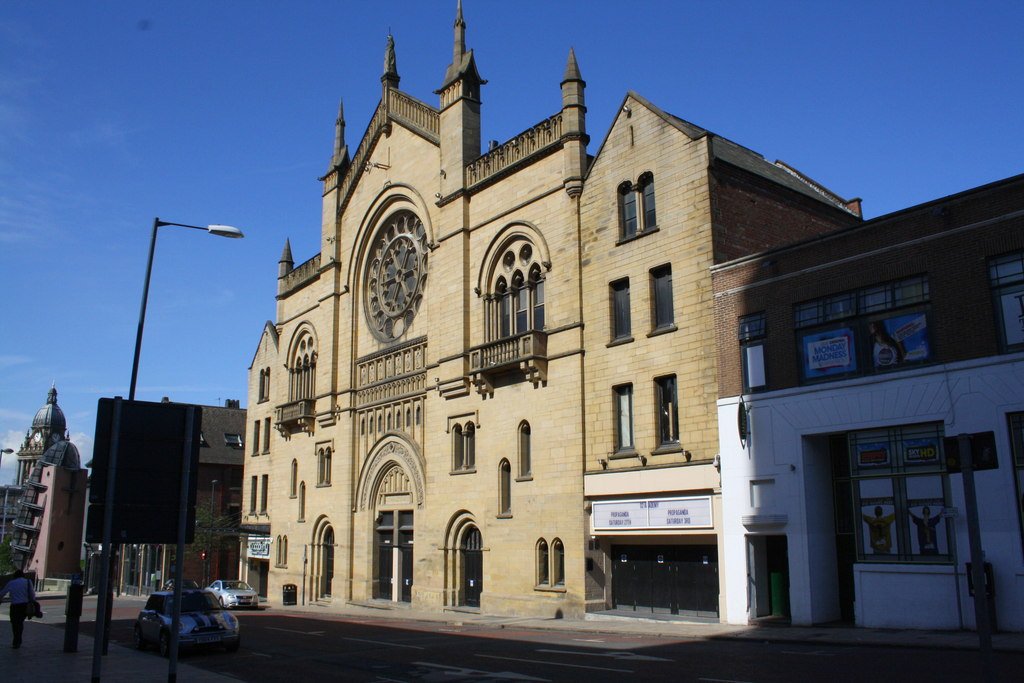
Early home of the LOP in Cookridge Street

== The Paper ==
In its earlier years the LOP, which was organized as a subsidiary of a cooperative, "Leeds Alternative Publications", was housed at the former Gaumont Coliseum at 55 Cookridge Street, Leeds, now known as the "O2 Academy". It moved from there in January 1987. The first issue was published on 20 January 1974. Describing itself as "libertarian socialist", it made it clear why the paper had been established, with the front-page headline: "Don't let the bastards carve us up – hit the bosses where it hurts (in their pockets)". However, it also carried a less polemical statement of intent:

Leeds Other Paper exists to provide an alternative newspaper in Leeds, i.e. a newspaper not controlled by big business and other vested interests. It is our intention to support all groups involved in active struggle in industry and elsewhere for greater control of their own lives.

It rapidly developed a strong focus on research and reporting, and coverage of workers' struggles and community campaigns.

The paper also started to provide listings for non-commercial community activities and organizations, later gradually extending this to provide a guide to events in Leeds, such as concerts, art galleries, cinemas and theatres, with an emphasis on "alternative" events rather than performances at established locations. In time, this "What's On" for Leeds came to account for about one half of the paper.

Women's issues were an important aspect of the paper's coverage, including support for a "Women Reclaim the Night" campaign. It also included a regular LGBTQ community section called, "Out in the North", that started by listing events but became a forum for members of local gay and lesbian communities. Similar to the established media, but unlike many of the other alternative papers of the time, LOP had a letters page and also carried classified advertising with an orientation to the needs of the alternative culture of Leeds, such as listings of jobs in the artistic and community sectors.

The 820 issues of Leeds Other Paper were produced by a cooperative. While a few people were paid small wages from the income from sales and advertisements, along with revenue from typesetting and printing carried out for other local organizations, such as the Labour Party, Leeds Jazz, The Woodcraft Folk, and the Leeds Federated Housing Association, as well as small jobs for cafés, and even text for LP sleeves, the bulk of the input for its early years came from many volunteers. The number of volunteers tended to decline when the paper went weekly in 1980. There was no editor or owner. Depending on the periodicity of its publication, editorial meetings were held monthly, fortnightly or weekly, at which a group of the volunteers would make decisions on the content for the next issue. As well as writers, LOP also needed photographers, cartoonists, paste-up artists, proofreaders, and crossword compilers. Local film-makers helped to promote LOP with a cinema advertisement, in exchange for free ads in the paper. Promotion was needed because there were always insufficient readers to fully fund the paper.

The Leeds Other Paper was sued for libel in 1983 by the British businessman and former chairman of Leeds United F.C., Manny Cussins. It agreed an out-of-court settlement of £1500 and immediately launched an appeal to readers to help pay. In 1984, one of its reporters was arrested for taking photographs of a protest event, but was given an Absolute Discharge, effectively a not-guilty verdict.

== Contributors ==
Those who worked on the paper included the anarchist musician and playwright Alice Nutter, who wrote a column on sexual matters, and James Brown, later a media entrepreneur and editor of Loaded and the British edition of GQ. One of those paid a small wage in the early days was Tony Harcup, who went on to be a professor of journalism at the University of Sheffield, and has written and lectured about the paper's history. Other contributors were John Quail, who would later write a history of British anarchism and Ann Scanlon, who became deputy editor of Sounds and author of a book on the Irish punk rock band, The Pogues.

== Collaboration with similar papers ==
In 1984 the Leeds Other Paper organized a conference with other alternative newspapers in Britain, which included the Islington Gutter Press, Durham Street Press, York Free Press, Coventry News and Brighton Voice. They developed a definition of an "alternative newspaper", as one that is anti-racist, anti-sexist, left-wing, openly political, not profit-driven, free from advertisers' influence, and run collectively.

== Closure ==
In 1991 the paper changed its name to the Northern Star in homage to a Chartist paper produced in Leeds between 1837 and 1852, which had the full name of the Northern Star and Leeds General Advertiser. When finances and enthusiasm finally ran out, the LOP closed in January 1994, exactly 20 years to the day after its first publication. Towards its end, the What's On part of the paper became the main attraction for buyers and the news portion played a subsidiary role. The LOP said goodbye with the following comment:

It was only a grotty little thing produced on a few sheets of recycled paper that 2000 people would buy, but that doesn't measure up the impact it had over the years. It had a profound effect on Leeds in its small way. We sincerely hope it won't be too long before someone else organises a publication which can continue the job we started 20 years ago.

== Archives ==
A full collection of all issues of the Leeds Other Paper is available at the Local and Family History department of Leeds Central Library.

== See also ==
- List of underground newspapers of the 1960s counterculture
