= Tuesday's Child (newspaper) =

Underground newspaper

- Type: Weekly underground newspaper; later biweekly
- Format: Tabloid
- Founder(s): Jerry Applebaum, Alex Apostolides, and others
- Editor-in-chief: Chester Anderson
- Founded: November 11, 1969; 56 years ago in Los Angeles
- Ceased publication: April 1970
- Political alignment: New Left
- Headquarters: Los Angeles, California

Tuesday's Child was a short-lived counterculture underground newspaper published in Los Angeles, California, in 1969–1970. Self-described on its masthead as "An ecumenical, educational newspaper for the Los Angeles occult & underground," it was founded by Los Angeles Free Press reporter Jerry Applebaum, Alex Apostolides, and a group of Freep staffers who left en masse after disagreements with Art Kunkin to found their own paper. Tuesday's Child was edited by Chester Anderson. (Note: Several scenes in Puppies, Chester Anderson's journal/memoir of sexual excess in the 1960s, were set in the offices of Tuesday's Child, where he slept in a back room while putting out the paper and cruising the nearby Sunset Strip.)

== Overview ==
Along with the usual underground paper staples of drugs, rock and roll, and New Left radical politics, Tuesday's Child devoted a good deal of space to the occult, with a number of issues printing arcane and obscure material by the occultist Aleister Crowley. The paper "is also notable for its decidedly queer stance and heady admixture of sex, politics, and mysticism. Its pages often feature[d] first-hand reportage of happenings in the Greater L.A. queer community ('GAY POWER STUNS HOLLYWOOD', Volume 1, Issue 5) as well as copious inches to kinky classifieds, personals, and erotic horoscopes."

Also part of the founding group was "a bunch of angry beat poets" who published "socialist poetry" in the paper.

Never achieving the success or circulation of its crosstown rival, the Free Press, Tuesday's Child quickly attained a degree of notoriety in and out of the underground with its coverage of the Charles Manson case. One issue featured an image of a crucified Charles Manson on the cover, and another issue had a photograph of Manson on the cover proclaiming him, "Man of the Year."

== Publication history ==
The first issue of Tuesday's Child was published on November 11, 1969, and published weekly (later biweekly) from an office in Hollywood in a tabloid format, selling for 25 cents.

The paper ceased publication in April 1970, and Jerry Applebaum went north and joined the Berkeley Tribe until it closed in 1972.

== See also ==
- List of underground newspapers of the 1960s counterculture
