= Pittsburgh Fair Witness =

Pittsburgh Fair Witness was a radical counterculture underground newspaper published in Pittsburgh, Pennsylvania from 1970 to 1973. The first 9 monthly issues published starting in February 1970 under the title Grok. Beginning with vol. 1, no. 10 (Nov. 4-25, 1970) the title was changed to Pittsburgh Fair Witness and the paper shifted to publication once every three weeks. Starting with the Dec. 3–17, 1971 issue, the paper was published on a biweekly schedule until its demise with vol. 4, no. 6 (June 1973). The PFW was staff-owned and published by a collective that called itself "The Commune." An editorial published in the May 26, 1972 issue under the heading "Our Rap" gives the paper's statement of purpose:

"The Fair Witness is published by a non-profit collective and is dedicated to the worldwide movement of people to control themselves—the movement to break down the authoritarian systems of government that are denying us our basic freedoms, that are responsible for needless genocidal wars, the perpetration of minority discrimination, the pollution of our environment and our bodies, the high concentration of power among the wealthy classes, exploitation of the individual, etc. The paper is dedicated to the struggle of all peoples to gain back the right to their own lives, the struggle to raise the consciousness of the world as a whole, the struggle to become independently productive through a working knowledge of the tools at our disposal. As a local paper our most important function concerns the movement here in western Pennsylvania."

The two titles Grok and Fair Witness are both references to the novel Stranger in a Strange Land by Robert A. Heinlein, a popular touchstone of the 1960s hippie counterculture. To "grok" is a form of deep holistic comprehension of any thing or situation (similar to hippie/beatnik slang "dig"); while a "Fair Witness" is a (fictional) service provided by a sort of hired court reporter with an eidetic memory who serves as a totally honest bonded eyewitness at any proceeding. The decision to change the name of the paper from Grok to Fair Witness was made at a raucous meeting when a newcomer from Berkeley, Mary Ciani, suggested "Fair Witness" as the title.

Contents of the Fair Witness were the usual 1960s underground press mix of underground comix (some originating locally in the Fair Witness; others like Crumb, Bode, etc. distributed nationally through the Alternative Features Syndicate), film, music, and book reviews, coverage of drugs, the occult, New Left and antiwar political activism, the Women's Liberation movement, ecology, etc.; along with local advertising and event and switchboard listings. It was a member of the Underground Press Syndicate and the Liberation News Service. A typical tabloid sized issue ran to about 24 pages and sold for 25 cents. The newspaper was laid out by a volunteer staff who met in offices above The Free Peoples Store, a co-op on Meyron Avenue in the city's Oakland neighborhood. Two local artists drew illustrations where needed, and some articles were researched and written locally, including one on the local Mellon family's wealth derived from its aluminum monopoly.

The Fair Witness was distributed throughout the western Pennsylvania area and locally through a network of about a hundred local shops (head shops, co-ops, record stores, boutiques, book stores, natural food stores, etc.) and was sold on the street by hawkers who kept a dime for every 25 cent copy they sold, picking up bundles for street distribution at The Free People's Store.

== See also ==
- List of underground newspapers of the 1960s counterculture
