= Northwest Passage (newspaper) =

United States underground newspaper

- Cover of Northwest Passage vol. 1, no. 2 (April 10, 1969) issue. Photograph of Northwest Passage staff and individuals associated with the local counterculture. Frank Kathman is the tall, mustachioed man in the upper right.
- Type: Biweekly newspaper
- Format: Tabloid/Alternative newspaper
- Founder(s): Frank Kathman, Laurence Kee, Michael Carlson
- Publisher: Frank Kathman
- Editor-in-chief: Laurence Kee
- Art Director: Michael Carlson
- Founded: March 17, 1969; 57 years ago in Bellingham, Washington
- Ceased publication: June 1986; 39 years ago
- Headquarters: Bellingham, Washington (1969–1977); Seattle, Washington (1977–1986)
- Circulation: 6,000 (1972)
- Website: https://mabel.wwu.edu/northwest-passage

The Northwest Passage was an underground newspaper published biweekly from 17 March 1969–June 1986, first in Bellingham, Washington (1969–1977), and then later in Seattle (1977–1986). The paper was co-founded by Frank Kathman, Laurence Kee, and Michael Carlson (now Harman). The newspaper covered countercultural topics, such as environmentalism and left-wing politics. It was discontinued due to rising print costs and low subscriber numbers.

== Publication history ==
Co-founder Frank Kathman took a class on the underground press with Bernard Weiner at Western Washington State College (now Western Washington University). Kathman and Michael Carlson later wrote and designed a poster calling for the founding of the Northwest Passage. They recruited Laurence Kee, who was a reporter at the Bellingham Herald. Kathman served as the publisher, Kee as editor, and Carlson as the art director. Kee paid the Lynden Tribune to print the first issue on March 17, 1969. Kee was later fired from the Bellingham Herald for his involvement with the Passage.

The paper was sustained by donations, sales in Bellingham and eattle, and advertising sales to Warner Bros. Records. Subscriptions were sold nationwide to individuals and libraries. The Tribune later refused to print the Passage, and the printing was moved to the Skagit Valley Herald for printing. The newspaper was published in tabloid format and sold for 25 cents. It was a member of the Underground Press Syndicate and the Liberation News Service. Volunteers produced the layout with a circulation of 6,000 copies by 1972.

Though initially focused on opposition to the Vietnam War, the paper's scope broadened to include investigative journalism on political and environmental issues in Bellingham and the Pacific Northwest. During the People's Park protests in Berkeley, California in the summer of 1969, the Passage was selected as a pool print representative for the national media. It was granted access to the park and embedded with a National Guard unit stationed in the park during clashes with demonstrators. Kee's article was later reprinted or referenced in other publications. The newspaper remained based in Bellingham for most of its publication, although it also covered issues beyond the local region.

Co-founding editor Laurence Kee left the paper to found the Seattle rock band Child.

In 1977, Northwest Passage relocated to Seattle and was produced at 1017 East Pike Street. After 1981, the Passage became a monthly publication.

Five articles from the Northwest Passage were included in the book Alternative Papers: Selections from the Alternative Press, 1979–1980.

== Notable contributors ==
- Mary Kay Becker, who later served as a state legislator and as a judge on the Washington State Court of Appeals.
- Bernard Weiner, who later became a critic and editor at the San Francisco Chronicle for approximately 20 years and co-founded the political-analysis website The Crisis Papers.
- Joel Connelly, who became the politics writer for the Seattle Post-Intelligencer.
- Barbara Sjoholm (writing under her pen name, Barbara Wilson), an American writer, editor, publisher, and translator. She is the co-founder of Seal Press.

== See also ==
- List of underground newspapers of the 1960s counterculture
- Biweekly newspapers
