= Gandalf's Garden =

UK magazine

Coordinates: 51.4817°N 0.1804°W

Exterior shot of the group's shop in World's End, London.

Gandalf's Garden was a mystical community which flourished at the end of the 1960s as part of the London hippie-underground movement, and ran a shop as well as a magazine of the same name. It emphasised the mystical interests of the period and advocated meditation and psychedelics in contrast to hard drugs.

== Location ==
The shop was based in World's End, at what was then the unfashionable end of Chelsea and a fair walk from Sloane Square tube station, passing the Chelsea Drug Store (where the record shop scene from A Clockwork Orange was filmed) and across the road from a clothes shop named Granny Takes a Trip, distinguished by the mini car protruding from its first floor level. Gandalf's Garden was directly opposite the World's End pub. The site is now unidentifiable under the World's End Estate.

The shop promoted a peaceful "vibe" and large cushions were provided on the floor for customers to "hang out" and drink honey-flavoured exotic teas. The basement provided not only a toilet but also an area for a "shrineroom" where homeless street people crashed during the day and spiritual meetings were held every evening. It was the first popular centre to invite teachers, gurus, monks, researchers, etc., from every spiritual tradition and practice and gained worldwide recognition.

Gandalf's Garden was dispersed in 1971 into various Gandalf's Garden Seed Centres in different parts of Britain, e.g., Edinburgh and York, holding weekly meetings of short meditation and discussion, and often speakers invited from the list of address of Muz Murray's main contacts near each Seed Centre's location.

== Gandalf's Garden magazine ==
The magazine emerged in 1968 and ran to 6 issues. It was part of the then-current Underground press (although they preferred to be called "Overground") as an alternative to the International Times and, particularly, OZ in departing from conventional black and white pages. In contrast to the psychedelic mayhem of many issues of OZ, Gandalf's Garden magazine was lyrical in choice of, for example, peach, light blue or pastel pink sheets with burgundy type, the colours rotating through the magazine. Articles in 1969 included:

- Atlantis Rising by Mark Western (issue 4)
- The Glastonbury Giants by Mary Caine (issue 4)
- The God'seye: The Aetherius Society by Colin Bord (issue 4)
- The Third Ear Band by Legolas (issue 4)
- Quintessence by Legolas (issue 6)
- The Cosmic Continent by Colin Bord (issue 6)

The letters page was called the "Seedbag". A touch of satire came in the form of a page "Oh to be in England" (press cuttings). Some well-known contributors to the magazine included Christopher Logue, Adrian Mitchell, Joan Baez and Spike Milligan.

The front cover of most issues set the tone with "Fear not, for you are now entering Gandalf's Garden" The introduction by Muz Murray included:

GANDALF'S GARDEN is the magical garden of our inner worlds, overgrowing into the world of manifestation. GANDALF'S GARDEN is soulflow from the pens of creators - mystics, writers, artists, diggers, delvers and poets. A wellspring of love and anguish that those with searching thirsts may drink thereof. As in the Stone Gardens of the Orient, where Soul Wizards sit within the stimulus of their own silences, contemplating the smoothness of the million pebbles, so should we seek to stimulate our own inner gardens if we are to save our Earth and ourselves from engulfment.

Gandalf's Garden had ceased to function in London by 1972 however Muz Murray continued to be active, touring the Gandalf's Garden Seed Centres and gave inspirational talks.

Copies of the magazine have now become collector's items and are selling for anything up to a hundred pounds per issue. However, all issues are now available on CD-ROM together with photos of the Garden Scene and a history of The Life and Times of GG.

The members of the team have mostly gone on to be deeply involved in various aspects of the new age movement, including shamanism, Sufism and alternative medicine. Muz Murray is known in India as Ramana Baba and teaches mantra yoga and Advaita Vedanta worldwide.

Dominic Monaghan, who played Merry the hobbit in the Lord of the Rings film, praised Muz Murray and Gandalf's Garden as a major influence in the United Kingdom in the documentary film Ringers: Lord of the Fans regarding Tolkien and his influence around the world.

== See also ==
- UK underground
- Underground press
- List of underground newspapers of the 1960s counterculture
