= Quicksilver Times =

- Cover of the Nov. 10–20, 1970 issue
- Type: Alternative newspaper
- Format: Irregularly published tabloid
- Founder(s): Terry Becker, Jr., et al.
- Editor-in-chief: Terry Becker, Jr.
- Founded: June 16, 1969; 56 years ago in Washington, D.C.
- Ceased publication: August 1972; 53 years ago
- Headquarters: Washington, D.C.
- Circulation: 20,000 (as of 1970)

Quicksilver Times was an antiwar, counterculture underground newspaper published in Washington, DC from 1969 to 1972. Terry Becker Jr., a former college newspaper editor and reporter for the Newhouse News Service, was the main instigator in the founding group of antiwar activists.

== Publication history ==
The Quicksilver Times' first issue was dated June 16, 1969. Publication was irregular.

A 1970 article in the Pittsburgh Press described Quicksilver Times as being put out every 10 days by a staff collective, with Terry Becker the first among equals. 20,000 copies were published of each issue at a total cost of $1,200. Staffers were unpaid but each received 400 free copies of each issue to sell for 25 cents each. Other vendors bought copies wholesale from the paper for 10 cents each. Some hippie street vendors were claimed to have sold as many as 1,000 copies.

During the latter part of its run, it was publishing once every three weeks. It ran for three years, with its final issue (vol. 4, no. 9) appearing in August 1972.

== Overview ==
Quicksilver Times was a member of the Underground Press Syndicate, and subscribed to the Liberation News Service. Along with opposition to the Vietnam War, the paper was outspoken in its support for the Black Panthers, feminism, gay rights, and other movements of the period, while embracing the aesthetics and ethos of the hippie/drug culture. The design of the tabloid paper was simple but lively, making liberal use of drawings, photographs, and underground comix.

It was one of several anti-government underground papers of the period now known to have been infiltrated by government informants.

== See also ==
- List of underground newspapers of the 1960s counterculture
