= Los Angeles Staff =

Underground newspaper

- Type: Weekly underground newspaper
- Format: Tabloid
- Founder(s): Brian Kirby and Phil Wilson
- Publisher: Phil Wilson
- Editor-in-chief: Brian Kirby
- Founded: 1970; 56 years ago in Los Angeles
- Ceased publication: c. June 1973
- Political alignment: Radical
- Headquarters: Los Angeles, California
- Circulation: 11,000

The Staff was an underground newspaper published in Los Angeles in the 1970s, printing many anti-war articles, and also covering the music scene and popular culture.

== Publication history ==
The Staff came into existence as a result of the temporary demise of the Los Angeles Free Press, which had been founded and published by Art Kunkin; much of the staff of the Free Press, led by managing editor Brian Kirby and art director Phil Wilson, left to form their own newspaper, calling it The Staff.

They first moved into quarters on Santa Monica Boulevard near Cahuenga Boulevard, in Hollywood, California. They later relocated to Hollywood Boulevard, just west of Western Avenue, in offices above a movie theater that was at that time showing softcore pornography.

== The Staff staff and contributors ==
- Brian Kirby, editor
- Philip Wilson, art director/publisher
- Mark Oberhofer, advertising sales/circulation
- Bob Chorush, columnist
- Mark Coppos, photographer
- Ridgely Cummings, writer
- Clay Geerdes, photographer and writer — wrote regularly for the paper on the underground comix industry, as well as supplying some photographs
- Lenny Marcus, writer
- Tom Moran, writer
- Bill Morrison, writer
- Thomas Warkentin, cartoonist
- Joyce Widoff, photographer
- Kim Gottlieb-Walker, photographer

== See also ==
- List of underground newspapers of the 1960s counterculture
