= San Francisco Express Times =

Underground newspaper, later known as Good Times

- Cover of the March 21, 1968 issue
- Type: Underground newspaper
- Owner: The Trystero Company
- Founder(s): Marvin Garson and Bob Novick
- Editor: (Express Times) Marvin Garson
- Founded: January 24, 1968; 58 years ago
- Ceased publication: August 2, 1972
- Relaunched: As Good Times (April 1969)
- Political alignment: Radical
- Language: English
- Headquarters: (Good Times) 2377 Bush Street
- City: San Francisco, California
- Country: United States
- ISSN: 0017-2197
- OCLC number: 1608301
- Free online archives: jstor.org (Express Times) jstor.org (Good Times)

San Francisco Express Times was a counterculture tabloid underground newspaper edited by Marvin Garson and published weekly in San Francisco, California from January 24, 1968, to March 25, 1969, for a total of 61 issues, covering and promoting radical politics, rock music, arts and progressive culture in the Bay Area. It was a member of the Underground Press Syndicate, and sold for 15 cents.

Starting in April 1969 the San Francisco Express Times changed its name to Good Times, publishing under that title with a substantially different editorial policy, lasting until August 2, 1972. In 2021, Newsweek referred to Good Times as an "anti-police and pro-violence" publication.

== Publication history ==
=== Express Times ===
Marvin Garson was a graduate of the University of California and a veteran of the Berkeley Free Speech Movement, where he edited an FSM newsletter, Wooden Shoe, along with his wife Barbara Garson. He started the Express Times with co-founder Bob Novick. Some members of the San Francisco Oracle collective were also involved in the paper's birth.

The Express Times featured a weekly cooking column, 30 Recipes Suitable for Framing, written by Alice Waters and illustrated by David Lance Goines. Regular contributors included Todd Gitlin, Greil Marcus, Paul Williams, Sandy Darlington, and Marjorie Heins. Catherine Yronwode, later known for her work in the comics industry and as a publisher in the field of folk magic, co-wrote a weekly astrology column for the Express Times. Staff photographers were Jeffrey Blankfort, followed by Nacio Jan Brown and Robert Altman. Cartoons and illustrations were provided by Jaxon, the syndicated editorial cartoons of Ron Cobb, and Sharon Rudahl.

During the year of its existence, highlights included extensive on-the-scene coverage of student rioting and the prolonged strike at San Francisco State University, and Lenny Heller's serialized novel of guerrilla warfare in the United States, Berkeley Guns.

In December 1968 editor Marvin Garson spent 20 days in jail in Chicago as a result of his participation as a journalist in a police and protester skirmish during the Democratic National Convention in August.

Documents released under the Freedom of Information Act show that the Express Times was one of a number of underground newspapers successfully infiltrated by the FBI, which had a paid informant on the staff.

=== Good Times ===
Cover of Good Times (April 9, 1971)

The renamed Good Times paper debuted in April 1969; the all-volunteer editorial collective was made up of residents of the Good Times Commune. Under this regime, the paper's contents and publication schedule were a good deal more relaxed than when it was the San Francisco Express Times.

Jesse Drew of the San Francisco digital archive Found SF described Good Times this way:

Good Times was the paper the radical left depended upon to keep up with the anti-war movement, the trials of political prisoners like the Soledad Brothers and Angela Davis, political corruption in San Francisco, and general communal information like vegetarian recipes and holistic health care. The all-volunteer collective put out Good Times on a regular bi-weekly, weekly, and then twice-a-week basis until sputtering out in the summer of 1972.

Underground cartoonist Harry Driggs served as Good Times's art director and staff cartoonist; he recruited fellow underground cartoonists Trina Robbins and Guy Colwell as contributors (Collwell, in fact, joined the Good Times Commune). Writer Nina Serrano wrote a series of articles on the Los Siete trial and contributed poetry to Good Times.

When Good Times decided to accept pornographic display advertising and classified sex trade advertising in early 1970, feminist staff members staged an action to prevent this from happening. When male staffers at Good Times tried to put out a special "Sex" issue, women staffers stole the mock-ups and page layouts and burned them.

== Legacy ==
In 1977, Allan Francovich and Gene Rosow produced and directed a documentary on the newspaper titled San Francisco Good Times, which included appearances by such notable figures as Pete Townsend of The Who and Timothy Leary.

== Connection to the Zodiac Killer case ==
The History Channel's 2009 television program MysteryQuest speculated that a member of the Good Times Commune, Richard Gaikowski (1936–2004), was a possible suspect in the unsolved San Francisco Zodiac Killer case. His appearance resembled a composite sketch of the killer, and a police dispatcher who had been contacted by the Zodiac, identified a recording of Gaikowski's voice as being the same as the Zodiac's.

In 2021, Newsweek published an article that also mentioned Gaikowski in relation to the Zodiac killings.

== See also ==
- List of underground newspapers of the 1960s counterculture
