= Philadelphia Free Press =

Front page of the Philadelphia Free Press (date unknown, ca. 1970?)

Philadelphia Free Press was a 1960s era underground newspaper published biweekly in Philadelphia, Pennsylvania from 1968 to 1972. Originally launched at Temple University in May 1968 as the monthly Temple Free Press, it separated from Temple and became the Philadelphia Free Press in September 1968.

Robert Glessing described the early evolution of the Free Press in his book The Underground Press in America:

"The Philadelphia Free Press was initially a quiet voice on the Temple University campus reporting only on college issues. Originally an unimaginative, pictureless two-page paper, the Free Press grew under doctoral candidate Bill Baggins and his activist staff to a colorful sixteen-page format including coverage of local, state and national movement news."

The Free Press was published by a collective and distributed free at Philadelphia-area colleges, with circulation in the thousands. Operating on a shoestring, its costs were partly subsidized by record company advertisements, with one generous record company even insisting on paying $300 for a $50 ad. The Free Press was more political than its local underground competition, the Distant Drummer, which cost 15 cents and was more interested in covering rock 'n' roll than the antiwar movement. Early founders included Bill and Judy Biggin, Jim Quinn (an organizer for the DuBois Club), and Temple undergraduates Rick Rubin and Art Platt; and contributors included local gay activist Kiyoshi Kuromiya. In early 1970 some of the more culturally oriented contributors, including Art Platt, left to form their own rival paper, the Plain Dealer.

The Free Press ran into a number of difficulties due to its Marxist-Leninist revolutionary politics; the paper was repeatedly harassed by the Philadelphia police under Frank Rizzo, in 1969 the paper was banned from Pennsylvania State University for its use of four letter words, Jim Quinn was briefly expelled (and subsequently reinstated) by Temple, and in 1971 Bill Biggin, a Canadian, was deported by the US Department of Justice. The paper closed in 1972, in part a victim of the winding down of the Vietnam War and the decline of student activism on campus.

== See also ==
- List of underground newspapers of the 1960s counterculture
