= NOLA Express =

American underground newspaper

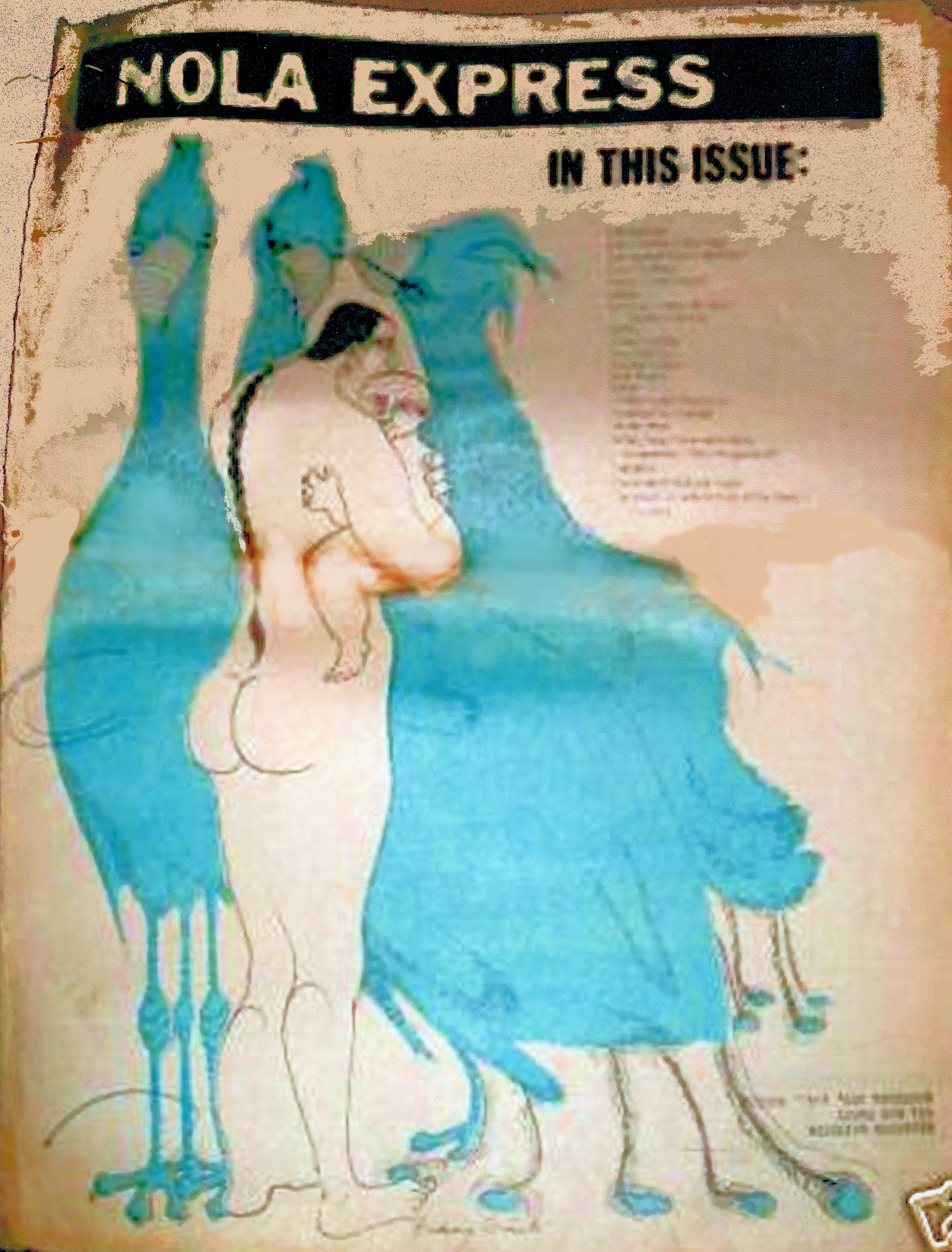
- The cover of NOLA Express No. 108 (June 9, 1972), with cover art by poet Hedwig Gorski.
- Type: Biweekly underground newspaper
- Format: Tabloid
- Founder(s): Darlene Fife and Robert Head
- Founded: 1967; 59 years ago in New Orleans
- Political alignment: Radical
- Headquarters: New Orleans, Louisiana
- Circulation: 11,000

NOLA Express is a publication started in 1967 in New Orleans by the young poets Darlene Fife and Robert Head. Part the underground free press movement of the 1960s, the paper was opposed to American imperialism, racism and materialism. It protested the Vietnam War and other government policies, along with social hypocrisies.

Named after William S. Burroughs's cut-up novel, Nova Express, the paper was produced by a dedicated band of activists, poets, and illustrators based in the French Quarter; it published uncensored news, art, and literature featuring Charles Bukowski, Hedwig Gorski, and many others.

NOLA Express is considered one of the most outrageous underground papers of the 1960s. Part of the controversy was due to the paper's inclusion of graphic images that many in Sixties society deemed pornographic. Such controversies increased readership and brought attention to the political causes that editors Fife and Head supported.

== History ==
Editors Robert Head and Darlene Fife were part of political protests that extended the "mimeo revolution" through pamphleteering used by freedom of speech poets during the 1960s.

New Orleans was considered the Third Coast by 1960s countercultural migrants who hitch hiked between San Francisco, Austin, New Orleans, Key West, and New York City. These social revolutionaries were able to find support, free housing, food, and work without commitments on the counterculture circuit. The underground press movement unified those in the anti-establishment service, social, and political movements, along with the Bohemian circuit of artists, freewheeling travelers, and hitchhikers into a force that permanently impacted American policy and culture. NOLA Express was mobilized by an ever-changing ragtag army of street vendors, at its peak selling 11,000 copies every two weeks.

Bukowski's syndicated column, Notes of a Dirty Old Man, ran in NOLA Express; Francisco McBride's illustration for Bukowski's piece "The Fuck Machine" was considered sexist, pornographic, and created an uproar.

In a landmark decision in 1971, NOLA Express beat federal obscenity charges.

== Affiliations ==
In 1967, the Underground Press Syndicate (UPS) cooperative was formed; the UPS allowed member papers to freely reprint content from any of the other member papers. NOLA Express was one of the most notorious UPS member newspapers, as it rallied activists, poets, and artists by giving them an uncensored voice. NOLA Express was also a member of the Committee of Small Magazine Editors and Publishers (COSMEP). These affiliations with two organizations that were often at cross purposes made NOLA Express one of the most radical and controversial publications of the counterculture movement.

== Contents of June 9, 1972, issue ==
The contents of a single issue of NOLA Express, No. 108 from June 9, 1972, covered investigative reporting about environmental and community issues, essays about current political and social issues, bold cartoons, statements by self-styled fringe leaders, and more created for the large fringe hippie and artist society of New Orleans and Algiers:

- "The Poisoning of Our Water Supply"
- "Lake Charles Police Sued"
- "Suit Against Richard Nixon Dismissed"
- "Kumi Maitreya La-La" by John Bennett
- "Notes of a Dirty Old Man" by Charles Bukowski
- "Walter Collins Ani Maitreya Marilyn Austin John Dulude Ericka Huggins poem/art centerfold
- "Merit Unified Field Theory III Geophysical Warfare: Vietnam"
- "The Youth International Party in Miami"
- "Planet News Small Press Communications Conspiracy"
- "The North American Book of The Dead" by D. A. Levy
- Ads for warehouse concerts (1/4-page ad for gigs by Edgar Winter / Groundhogs, ZZ Top / Wishbone Ash)
- Letters, calendar of events, community bulletin board, classified ads

== Archives ==
Darlene Fife, poet, translator, and co-founder of NOLA Express, wrote a personal and insightful memoir of the paper, the people who produced it, and the community it served, titled Portraits from Memory: New Orleans in The Sixties. The book includes some of the correspondence and illustrations from notable issues.

An archive of NOLA Express correspondence and issues is housed at the University of Connecticut.

== See also ==
- List of underground newspapers of the 1960s counterculture
