= Distant Drummer =

Distant Drummer was a 1960s counterculture underground newspaper published in Philadelphia, Pennsylvania, United States from November 1967 to July 1979. It changed titles twice: from October 2, 1970 to August 12, 1971 (issues no. 105–151) it was Thursday's Drummer, and subsequently it was known simply as The Drummer until its demise in 1979, after a run of 568 issues. It was a member of the Underground Press Syndicate and also used material from the Liberation News Service.

Printed in a tabloid format, initially as a biweekly, it appeared on a weekly basis starting in January 1969. It was founded and edited by Don DeMaio, a former Penn State journalism major and Newsday employee. Initial contributors included the young Cynthia Heimel and Mark B. Cohen. Published in tabloid newspaper format, it cost 15 cents, later raised to 25 cents.

At one point, several people were arrested for selling an issue which contained what the police considered an obscene cartoon about police officers. The animosity between the police and the publication was even deeper. In April, 1968, after articles in the paper which lambasted political corruptness and urged terrorist tactics to stop it, when it published critical information on the police department, then-Police Commissioner Frank Rizzo urged that staff at the paper be charged with solicitation to commit murder, but the District Attorney declined to do so. Police stopped the arrests, which were intended to drain the newspaper's financial resources and drive it out of business, after the paper's lawyers filed an injunction.

Paid circulation was reported in 1972 at 10,000 copies. Initially, the paper's circulation grew quickly, as it reported on Philadelphia's radical/hippie community, served as a forum for commentary on local and national politics, and provided detailed information on the city's music and arts scene from a baby boomer perspective. It had a particular emphasis on rock and roll and coverage of ongoing battles between the hip and radical communities and the Philadelphia police. Its politics were less militant than its local competitor in the underground press, the Philadelphia Free Press.

Bob Ingram, who identified himself as an editor of the paper, which was initially published out of an office at 315 S. 13th Street before it had any cachet (and later on South Street and at 1609 Pine Street), said the weekly budget for all content was $125 at one point.

Jonathan Stern, who purchased the paper from the founder, Don DeMaio, was the publisher from the early 1970s until it closed. The final editor was Robert Cherry.

A lawsuit filed against the paper resulted in a judgment of $75,000 against it and, according to Ingram, was a deciding factor in the decision to finally close the paper, even while the award was appealed (according to an "obituary" published in October 1979 in the Daily Pennsylvanian, the student-run daily at the University of Pennsylvania).

By that point, the paper had metamorphosed from a radical politicized counter culture paper to one which promoted itself as having "the best weekly calendar," a listing of weekly events with cultural "articles you can't find anywhere else!"

Among notable contributors to the paper were Jonathan Takiff, who has been the longterm music critic at the Philadelphia Daily News; Len Lear, a later reporter for the Philadelphia Tribune and the Chestnut Hill Local; Clark DeLeon, who wrote a column for many years for the Inquirer and had a radio show on WPHT radio; and Art Carduner, an often-acerbic book reviewer in the paper, who ran his own movie theater, the Band Box in Germantown, with movies he chose to suit his own tastes. David Fricke was the music editor in the mid-1970s and went on to be music editor at Rolling Stone Magazine. John Diliberto, host of the public radio show Echoes, was a critic and journalist at the paper in the mid-1970s. Mike McGrath, the host of a local public radio program, You Bet Your Garden, was also a onetime entertainment editor of the Drummer. David D. Schein, host of "The Arts Menagerie" radio program on WHYY, public radio in Philadelphia, contributed articles on the arts and theater scene 1972-73. Music critic Keith Mason was a public radio host, concert producer and later author of the historical memoir "Please Stand Up." Author Thom Nickels wrote many features for the newspaper and authored the Drummer column "Omar Bloom at White Plains Hospital" for a number of years. Robert Cherry wrote three books, among them a biography of Wilt Chamberlain, Wilt: Larger Than Life.

== See also ==
- List of underground newspapers of the 1960s counterculture
