= The Organ (newspaper) =

US underground newspaper

The Organ #4 underground newspaper, with Robert Crumb centerfold Charles Manson comics

The Organ was a US counterculture underground newspaper which produced a total of 9 irregularly published issues in San Francisco in a 36-page folded tabloid format between July 1970 and July 1971. It featured two-color covers, black-and-white interiors and a double-page centerfold poster in each issue, and cost 50 cents. It was published by Christopher Weills and edited by Gerard van der Leun. Contributors included Robert Crumb, S. Clay Wilson, Greg Irons, Tom Veitch, Dave Sheridan, Robert Anton Wilson, Robert Shea, William Burroughs, Michael Rossmann, Richard Lupoff, Sandy Darlington, Howard J. Pearlstein, and Don Donahue. Interviews with a number of countercultural figures appeared, including Kenneth Anger, Jerry Garcia, and Allen Ginsberg.

In 2007, a "coffee-table paperback" titled The Organ Reader was published by Ramble House, edited and with introductions by Lupoff, Pearlstein, and Fender Tucker.

== See also ==
- List of underground newspapers of the 1960s counterculture
