= Eugene Augur =

Underground newspaper in Eugene, Oregon, United States

The Eugene Augur
- Type: Underground newspaper
- Founded: 1969
- Ceased publication: 1974
- Political alignment: New Left
- Headquarters: Eugene, Oregon

The Eugene Augur was a local countercultural underground newspaper published in Eugene, Oregon, United States, from 1969 to 1974.

== History ==
Starting with its first issue dated October 14, 1969, the Augur, produced by a cooperative of left-wing political activists aligned with the antiwar movement, appeared twice a month, offering up a mix of New Left politics and acid rock counterculture to an audience of students, hippies, radicals and disaffected working class youth in the Eugene area. The paper's coverage ranged from antiwar demonstrations, exposing local narcotics agents, and rock festivals, to the growth of backwoods communes in Southern Oregon and the annual Oregon Renaissance Faire. In August 1972, the paper cut publication to a monthly schedule. Staffers included Peter Jensen and Jim Redden, son of a prominent Oregon politician and later a reporter for the Portland Tribune.

== See also ==
- List of underground newspapers of the 1960s counterculture
