= Eugene Weekly =

Alternative weekly newspaper published in Eugene, Oregon

- Type: Alternative weekly
- Format: Tabloid
- Owner: Camilla Mortensen
- Founded: 1982
- Language: English
- Headquarters: 1251 Lincoln Street; Eugene, Oregon
- Circulation: approx. 36,000 (as of 2011)
- Website: eugeneweekly.com

Eugene Weekly is an alternative weekly newspaper published on Thursdays in Eugene, Oregon. It began publication in 1982 and was originally named What's Happening.

== Overview ==
The free newspaper, published every Thursday, has a circulation of 30,000. It publishes an annual "Best of Eugene" list, a restaurant guide ("Chow!"), and special sections on festivals, music, wine, health and travel. Eugene Weekly covers local and state politics, news, arts and culture, and it publishes investigative and solutions journalism.

== History ==
A weekly arts and culture newspaper named What's Happening was first published on September 16, 1982. It started as an effort to retain a particularly popular section, the events calendar, of the immediately previous alternative newspaper, the Willamette Valley Observer, itself a successor to the Eugene Augur. A collective of five residents (Lucia McKelvey, Sonja Snyder, Liz Lyman, Lois Wadsworth and Bill Snyder) launched the newspaper and operated it in its early days. It was sold to Art and Anita Johnson and Fred and Georga Taylor in 1991; Fredy Taylor was the former editor and managing editor of The Wall Street Journal. The newspaper was renamed to Eugene Weekly in 1993 and expanded their scope beyond arts and culture to cover local news and politics. Fred Taylor remained one of the owners of the Weekly until his death in 2015.

=== Embezzlement ===
In December 2023, the newspaper announced it had lost over $100,000 to an embezzlement scheme by a former business manager, Elisha Young, who had access to their finances. The loss left the Weekly with several months of unpaid bills and unable to pay its 10 staff members, who were laid off beginning on December 21. The newspaper was put on hiatus due to an unpaid debt to its printer; a fundraising campaign was started on GoFundMe to restart operations. In one week, the paper raised more than $100,000 in donations, leading Weekly managers to suggest they could restart printing before the end of January. However, managers estimated $188,000 is needed to get the paper out of enough debt to get back on track. After receiving $150,000 in donations, the newspaper announced it would resume weekly printing starting Feb. 8 with roughly 25,000 copies going to newsstands.

In October 2024, Eugene Weekly received a $100,000 grant from Press Forward to expand its coverage. Later that year the paper's co-founder Anita Johnson died. Her 60% ownership stake then went into a family trust for her four children who plan to transfer it to editor-in-chief Camilla Mortensen, who wants to convert the Eugene Weekly into a nonprofit organization or give ownership to a purpose trust.

In July 2025, Young was extradited from Ohio to Lane County and arraigned on theft charges. She was sentenced to three years in prison in May 2026.

On August 1, 2026, Mortensen officially took over as owner.
