= Cynthia Heimel =

American writer (1947–2018)

- Born: Cynthia Glick; 13 July 1947; Philadelphia, Pennsylvania, U.S.
- Died: 25 February 2018 (aged 70); Los Angeles, California, U.S.

Cynthia Heimel (née Glick; July 13, 1947 – February 25, 2018) was an American feminist humorist writer from Philadelphia, Pennsylvania. She was a columnist and foremost the author of satirical books known for their unusual titles, aimed at a female readership, as well as a playwright and television writer.

== Life and career ==
Heimel was born in Philadelphia. She wrote for the alternative magazine Distant Drummer for two years in Philadelphia in the late 1960s. She briefly worked as a secretary and an actress. She joined The SoHo Weekly News as an advertising assistant, then began publishing articles with a piece on an anarchist conference in New York City. She became Features Editor, Centerfold Editor and a star features writer, worked briefly at Penthouse Magazine, returned to SWN, then left in 1980 to work at New York magazine and then New York Daily News. She left the New York Daily News and was then hired by The Village Voice to write alternating columns, "Dear Problem Lady" and "Tongue in Chic." Her first book, Sex Tips for Girls, was largely a collection of her Voice columns. Published in 1983, it was a semi-satirical take on Cosmopolitan (and other "women's" magazines) and their "how to please your man" approach to feminism. Though she gives actual sex tips, Heimel's main focus was sexual self-confidence for women and the idea that women actually enjoy sex, as well as the rigors of dating. In 2008, New York Magazine noted that "Much of the gospel about dating and sex is still achingly current". By 2002, it had never been out of print. Heimel later regretted the perception of her after writing the book, "as if I was an expert on sex".

By the mid-1980s, she had not only the column in The Village Voice, but a column in Vogue magazine and a column in Playboy magazine, the first ever by a woman about women. She continued to produce books based on her columns into the mid 1990s, while becoming a writer for television with Kate and Allie, then moving to Hollywood, where she worked on Dear John. In 1986, she wrote a play, A Girl's Guide to Chaos that was also published as a book.

The New York Times said of her that "Like Dorothy Parker, Ms. Heimel is an urban romantic with a scathing X-ray vision that penetrates her most deeply cherished fantasies." Douglas Adams said she was "like P.G. Wodehouse if he wrote about sex".

Kirkus summed them up in a review of If You Leave Me, Can I Come Too?: "in addition to the saucy insights on the so-called war between the sexes, the wry disbelief of the potential for living anywhere except Manhattan, and the cynical acceptance of the inevitability of aging that marked her previous compilations (Get Your Tongue Out Of My Mouth, I'm Kissing You Good-Bye!, 1993, etc.), Heimel now feels confident enough to offer her kinder, gentler side as well."

Heimel stated in Advanced Sex Tips for Girls, her final book, that she was not accepted by the feminist movement; that being too sexy to be an academic feminist and too angry for "women's" magazines, she sometimes had difficulty finding outlets that would publish her work; and that for this reason, she accepted an offer to work for Playboy and was the writer of its "Women" column for decades from 1983. Her column was ended around 2000 when the editors of Playboy expressed concern that Heimel's feminist attitudes would put off male readers.

On writing Advanced Sex Tips nearly 20 years later, Heimel said that "The first one is kind of a how-to manual and the second one is kind of a why manual." Kirkus Reviews said of Advanced Sex Tips that "the beleaguered humorist’s sex life is not all that much better: she seems to prefer her pack of dogs". Publishers Weekly contrasted the two books: "Twenty years ago, Heimel's Sex Tips for Girls was a hot item for women with bad attitude; her down-and-dirty, irreverent take on male-female relations was a welcome relief, after eons of machismo and years of second-wave feminist struggle. Her sequel, however, is a mixed bag".

=== Personal life ===
Heimel was raised in Overbrook Park, Philadelphia; her mother was a secretary and her father was a pharmacist. She left home at 17 and lived in Center City. She worked as an artist's model before she found work at Philadelphia's Distant Drummer weekly newspaper. She met and married radio announcer and painter Steve Heimel, and they had a son, Brodie, in 1970. She separated from her husband after 18 months when he found work in Houston and she moved to England. After they separated, she lived with Brodie in communes and worked as a secretary and with "lefty social organizations" in London for three years and then moved to New York City. She later lived in Oakland CA, Coudersport PA and Los Angeles, and married and divorced Abe Opincar. She was a dog owner.

Cheryl Lavin wrote of her in a 1995 interview that "Loyal readers assume the "I" in Heimel's columns is Heimel ... They're partly right, partly wrong."

=== Death ===
Heimel died at age 70 on February 25, 2018 in Los Angeles.

== Works ==
=== Books ===
- Sex Tips For Girls ISBN 9780671477257
- But Enough About You: Avoiding Fabulousness ISBN 9780671552640
- If You Can't Live without Me, Why Aren't You Dead Yet?! ISBN 0871134446
- Get Your Tongue out of My Mouth, I'm Kissing You Good-Bye! ISBN 0871135388
- If You Leave Me, Can I Come Too? ISBN 0871136031
- When the Phone Doesn't Ring, It'll Be Me! ISBN 9780871136343
- Advanced Sex Tips for Girls: This Time It's Personal ISBN 0684849224

=== Plays ===
- A Girl's Guide to Chaos (1986), directed by Wynn Handman, staged in New York, Chicago and Los Angeles.

=== Television series ===
- Dear John, writer
- Kate & Allie, writer
