= The Great Speckled Bird (newspaper) =

Publication in Atlanta, Georgia, U.S. (1968–1976, 1988–1990)

- Cover of the v.2, n.17 issue (1969)
- Publisher: Atlanta Cooperative News Project
- Founded: March 8, 1968; 58 years ago
- Ceased publication: 1976; 50 years ago
- Language: English
- Headquarters: Atlanta, Georgia
- Circulation: 22,000
- ISSN: 0017-369X
- OCLC number: 1751560
- Website: Preserved at Archive.org
- Free online archives: voices.revealdigital.org

The Great Speckled Bird was a counterculture underground newspaper based in Atlanta from 1968 to 1976 and 1988 through 1990. Commonly known as The Bird, it was founded by New Left activists from Emory University and members of the Southern Student Organizing Committee, an offshoot of Students for a Democratic Society. Founding editors included Tom and Stephanie Coffin, Howard Romaine and Gene Guerrero Jr. The first issue appeared March 8, 1968, and within 6 months it was publishing weekly. By 1970 it was the third largest weekly newspaper in Georgia with a paid circulation of 22,000 copies. The paper subscribed to Liberation News Service, a leftist news collective. The office of The Great Speckled Bird at the north end of Piedmont Park (240 Westminster Drive) was firebombed and destroyed on May 6, 1972. In a letter to the editor of the New York Review of Books, Jack Newfield et al. noted that the bombing occurred after the paper published an exposé of the mayor of Atlanta.

Writing in the Atlanta Magazine, Justin Heckert described The Bird's approach as one that treated objectivity as "a myth perpetuated by the capitalist press." According to a statement in The Bird, "These are our opinions and we are entitled to them, they are not written anywhere else. So, don't expect us to tell both sides of the story. The big newspapers, magazines, TV, and radio do that all day long. Here you will hear our side of things." The Bird chose to report on issues not covered in mainstream newspapers. The paper focused on the war in Vietnam, black power, women's liberation, gay activism, red-baiting, Atlanta politics, labor, and environmental issues. The Bird's Women's Caucus challenged the paper's advertising norms and pushed the collective to share tasks more equitably. The Bird included comics by Ron Ausburn and contributions on art and culture by Miller Francis. There was a brief re-birth of the newspaper in the 1980s, [need exact dates] from about 1984 to 1989.

The newspaper, affectionally known as "The Bird," was originally named after the country-gospel song of the same name. In 2011 Georgia State University made a digital archive of the Bird available online.

== See also ==
- List of underground newspapers of the 1960s counterculture
- Media in Atlanta
