= Muther Grumble =

Defunct UK newspaper (1971-1973)

Muther Grumble was an alternative newspaper produced between 1971 and 1973 in Durham City, UK, and circulating in North-East England. Seventeen issues were published, originally in large format and then later in A4 format, and the print run peaked at 8,000. It was set up with finances from a local journalist and was edited largely by a voluntary collective from an upstairs office in Silver Street in Durham City. It covered politics and citizen rights as well as music and culture. It broke the story of corrupt building contracts involving T. Dan Smith and John Poulson. It was sold on the streets and in a few bookshops all over the North-East. The collective that ran it also ran a general advice service and a claimants' advice service.
