= Underground press =

Publications produced without the official approval of a dominant group

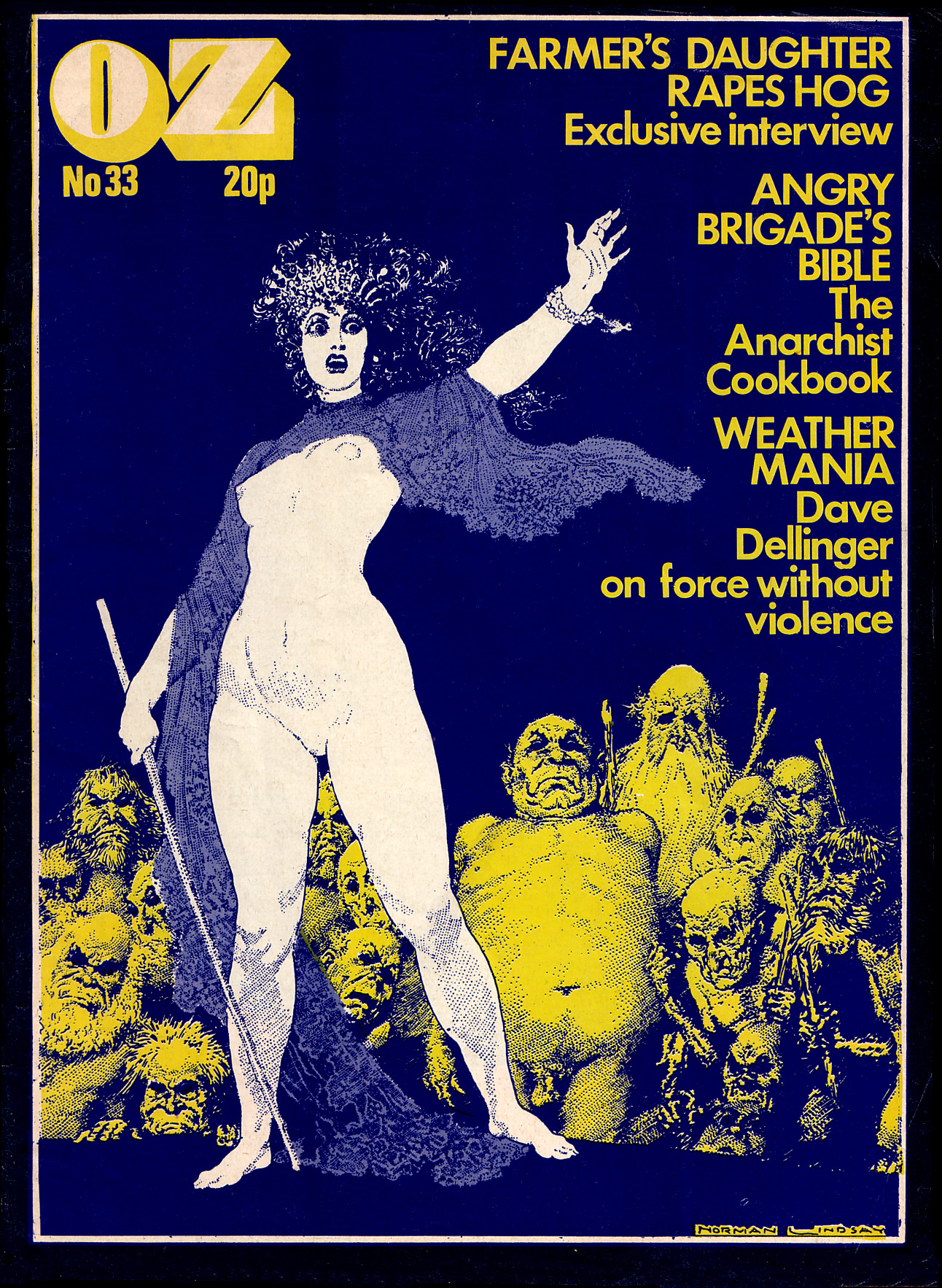
Oz (London) No.33, February 1971. Cover image by Norman Lindsay

The terms underground press or clandestine press refer to periodicals and publications that are produced without official approval, illegally or against the wishes of a dominant (governmental, religious, or institutional) group. In specific recent (post-World War II) Asian, American and Western European context, the term "underground press" has most frequently been employed to refer to the independently published and distributed underground papers associated with the counterculture of the late 1960s and early 1970s in India and Bangladesh in Asia, in the United States and Canada in North America, and the United Kingdom and other western nations. It can also refer to the newspapers produced independently in repressive regimes. In German occupied Europe, for example, a thriving underground press operated, usually in association with the Resistance. Other notable examples include the samizdat and bibuła, which operated in the Soviet Union and Poland respectively, during the Cold War.

== Origins ==
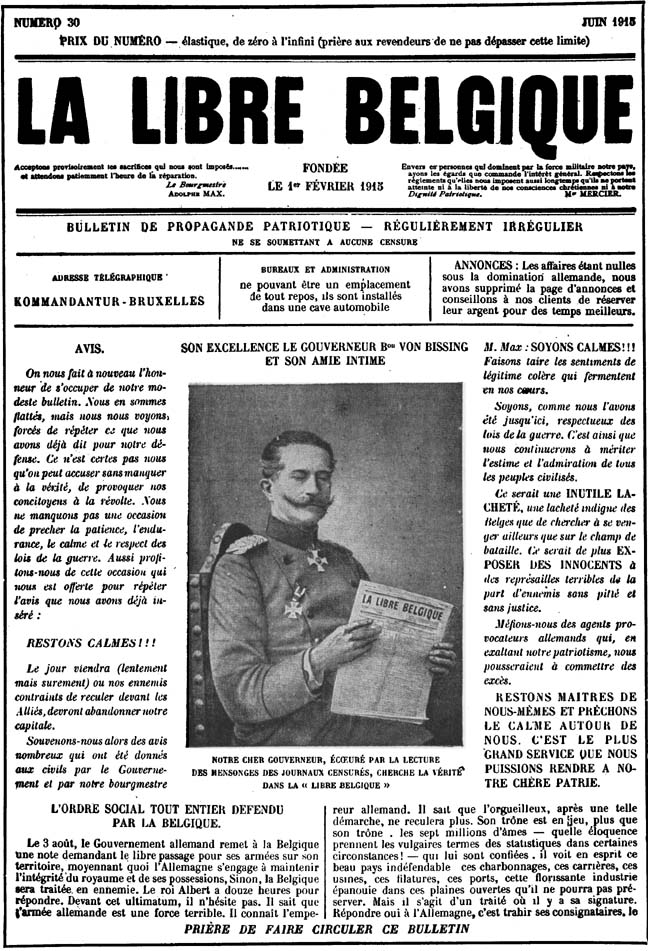
La Libre Belgique, an underground newspaper produced in German-occupied Belgium during World War I

In Western Europe, a century after the invention of the printing press, a widespread underground press emerged in the mid-16th century with the clandestine circulation of Calvinist books and broadsides, many of them printed in Geneva, which were secretly smuggled into other nations where the carriers who distributed such literature might face imprisonment, torture or death. Both Protestant and Catholic nations fought the introduction of Calvinism, which with its emphasis on intractable evil made its appeal to alienated, outsider subcultures willing to violently rebel against both church and state. In 18th century France, a large illegal underground press of the Enlightenment emerged, circulating anti-Royalist, anti-clerical and pornographic works in a context where all published works were officially required to be licensed. Starting in the mid-19th century an underground press sprang up in many countries around the world for the purpose of circulating the publications of banned Marxist political parties; during the German Nazi occupation of Europe, clandestine presses sponsored and subsidized by the Allies were set up in many of the occupied nations, although it proved nearly impossible to build any sort of effective underground press movement within Germany itself.

The French resistance published a large and active underground press that printed over 2 million newspapers a month; the leading titles were Combat, Libération, Défense de la France, and Le Franc-Tireur. Each paper was the organ of a separate resistance network, and funds were provided from Allied headquarters in London and distributed to the different papers by resistance leader Jean Moulin. Allied prisoners of war (POWs) published an underground newspaper called POW WOW. In Eastern Europe, also since approximately 1940, underground publications were known by the name samizdat.

The countercultural underground press movement of the 1960s borrowed the name from previous "underground presses" such as the Dutch underground press during the Nazi occupations of the 1940s. Those predecessors were truly "underground", meaning they were illegal, thus published and distributed covertly. While the countercultural "underground" papers frequently battled with governmental authorities, for the most part they were distributed openly through a network of street vendors, newsstands and head shops, and thus reached a wide audience.

The underground press in the 1960s and 1970s existed in most countries with high GDP per capita and freedom of the press; similar publications existed in some developing countries and as part of the samizdat movement in the communist states, notably Czechoslovakia. Published as weeklies, monthlies, or "occasionals", and usually associated with left-wing politics, they evolved on the one hand into today's alternative weeklies and on the other into zines.

== In Australia ==
The most prominent underground publication in Australia was a satirical magazine called Oz (1963 to 1969), which initially owed a debt to local university student newspapers such as Honi Soit (University of Sydney) and Tharunka (University of New South Wales), along with the UK magazine Private Eye. The original edition appeared in Sydney on April Fools' Day, 1963 and continued sporadically until 1969. Editions published after February 1966 were edited by Richard Walsh, following the departure for the UK of his original co-editors Richard Neville and Martin Sharp, who went on to found a British edition (London Oz) in January 1967. In Melbourne Phillip Frazer, founder and editor of pop music magazine Go-Set since January 1966, branched out into alternate, underground publications with Revolution in 1970, followed by High Times (1971 to 1972) and The Digger (1972 to 1975).

=== List of Australian underground papers ===
- The Digger (1972–1975)
- The Living Daylights (1973–1974)
- High Times (1971–1972)
- Oz (Sydney) (1963–1969)
- New Dawn magazine
- Nexus magazine
- Revolution (1970–1971)

== In the United Kingdom ==
The underground press offered a platform to the socially impotent and mirrored the changing way of life in the UK underground.

In London, Barry Miles, John Hopkins, and others produced International Times from October 1966 which, following legal threats from The Times newspaper was renamed IT.

Richard Neville arrived in London from Australia, where he had edited Oz (1963 to 1969). He launched a British version (1967 to 1973), which was A4-sized (as opposed to IT's broadsheet format). Very quickly, the relaunched Oz shed its more austere satire magazine image and became a mouthpiece of the underground. It was the most colourful and visually adventurous of the alternative press (sometimes to the point of near-illegibility), with designers like Martin Sharp.

Other publications followed, such as Friends (later Frendz), based in the Ladbroke Grove area of London; Ink, which was more overtly political; and Gandalf's Garden which espoused the mystic path.

=== Legal challenges ===
The flaunting of sexuality within the underground press provoked prosecution. IT was taken to court for publishing small ads for homosexuals; despite the 1967 legalisation of homosexuality between consenting adults in private, importuning remained subject to prosecution. Publication of the Oz "School Kids" issue brought charges against the three Oz editors, who were convicted and given jail sentences. This was the first time the Obscene Publications Act 1959 was combined with a moral conspiracy charge. The convictions were, however, overturned on appeal.

=== Harassment and intimidation ===
Police harassment of the British underground, in general, became commonplace, to the point that in 1967 the police seemed to focus in particular on the apparent source of agitation: the underground press. The police campaign may have had an effect contrary to that which was presumably intended. If anything, according to one or two who were there at the time, it actually made the underground press stronger. "It focused attention, stiffened resolve, and tended to confirm that what we were doing was considered dangerous to the establishment", remembered Mick Farren. From April 1967, and for some while later, the police raided the offices of International Times to try, it was alleged, to force the paper out of business. In order to raise money for IT a benefit event was put together, "The 14 Hour Technicolor Dream" Alexandra Palace on 29 April 1967.

On one occasion – in the wake of yet another raid on IT – London's alternative press succeeded in pulling off what was billed as a 'reprisal attack' on the police. The paper Black Dwarf published a detailed floor-by-floor 'Guide to Scotland Yard', complete with diagrams, descriptions of locks on particular doors, and snippets of overheard conversation. The anonymous author, or 'blue dwarf', as he styled himself, claimed to have perused archive files, and even to have sampled one or two brands of scotch in the Commissioner's office. The London Evening Standard headlined the incident as "Raid on the Yard". A day or two later The Daily Telegraph announced that the prank had resulted in all security passes to the police headquarters having to be withdrawn and then re-issued.

=== Support from British pop culture ===
By the end of the decade, community artists and bands such as Pink Floyd (before they "went commercial"), The Deviants, Pink Fairies, Hawkwind, Michael Moorcock and Steve Peregrin Took would arise in a symbiotic co-operation with the underground press. The underground press publicised these bands and this made it possible for them to tour and get record deals. The band members travelled around spreading the ethos and the demand for underground newspapers and magazines grew and flourished for a while.

Neville published an account of the counterculture called Play Power, in which he described most of the world's underground publications. He also listed many of the regular key topics from those publications, including the Vietnam War, Black Power, politics, police brutality, hippies and the lifestyle revolution, drugs, popular music, new society, cinema, theatre, graphics, cartoons, etc.

=== Local papers ===
Apart from publications such as IT and Oz, both of which had a national circulation, the 1960s and 1970s saw the emergence of a whole range of local alternative newspapers, which were usually published monthly. These were largely made possible by the introduction in the 1950s of offset litho printing, which was much cheaper than traditional typesetting and use of the rotary letterpress. Such local papers included:

- Aberdeen Peoples Press
- Alarm (Swansea)
- Andersonstown News (Belfast)
- Brighton Voice
- Bristol Voice
- Feedback (Norwich)
- Hackney People's Press
- Islington Gutter Press
- Leeds Other Paper
- Response (Earl's Court, London)
- Sheffield Free Press
- West Highland Free Press

A 1980 review identified some 70 such publications around the United Kingdom but estimated that the true number could well have run into hundreds. Such papers were usually published anonymously, for fear of the UK's draconian libel laws. They followed a broad anarchist, libertarian, left-wing of the Labour Party, socialist approach but the philosophy of a paper was usually flexible as those responsible for its production came and went. Most papers were run on collective principles.

=== List of UK underground papers ===
- Bit
- Black Dwarf
- Brighton Voice
- The Fanatic
- Fapto
- Friends (later Frendz)
- Gandalf's Garden
- Gay News
- Heatwave
- Idiot International
- Ink
- International Times (also IT)
- Muther Grumble
- OZ (London)
- Peace News
- Running Man

== North America ==
=== Origins ===
The North American countercultural press of the 1960s drew inspiration from predecessors that had begun in the 1950s, such as the Village Voice and Paul Krassner's satirical paper The Realist. Arguably, the first underground newspaper of the 1960s was the Los Angeles Free Press, founded in 1964 and first published under that name in 1965.

=== 1965–1973 boom period ===
East Village Other (April 16 – May 1, 1967)

The East Village Other was "formed as a stock company, with Walter Bowart, Allen Katzman and Dan Rattiner each owning three shares", co-founded in October 1965 by Walter Bowart, Ishmael Reed, Allen Katzman, Dan Rattiner, Sherry Needham, and John Wilcock. It began as a monthly and then went biweekly.

According to Louis Menand, writing in The New Yorker, the underground press movement in the United States was "one of the most spontaneous and aggressive growths in publishing history." During the peak years of the phenomenon, there were generally about 100 papers currently publishing at any given time. But the underground press phenomenon proved short-lived.

An Underground Press Syndicate (UPS) roster published in November 1966 listed 14 underground papers, 11 of them in the United States, two in England, and one in Canada. Within a few years the number had mushroomed. A 1971 roster, published in Abbie Hoffman's Steal This Book, listed 271 UPS-affiliated papers; 11 were in Canada, 23 in Europe, and the remainder in the United States. The underground press' combined readership eventually reached into the millions.

The early papers varied greatly in visual style, content, and even in basic concept — and emerged from very different kinds of communities. Many were decidedly rough-hewn, learning journalistic and production skills on the run. Some were militantly political while others featured highly spiritual content and were graphically sophisticated and adventurous.

By 1969, virtually every sizable city or college town in North America boasted at least one underground newspaper. Among the most prominent of the underground papers were the San Francisco Oracle, San Francisco Express Times, Rags (San Francisco); the Berkeley Barb and Berkeley Tribe; The Image, Open City (Los Angeles), Fifth Estate (Detroit), Other Scenes (dispatched from various locations around the world by John Wilcock); The Helix (Seattle); Avatar (Boston); The Broadside (Cambridge, Massachusetts ); The Chicago Seed; The Great Speckled Bird (Atlanta); The Rag (Austin, Texas); Rat (New York City); Space City! (Houston) and in Canada, The Georgia Straight (Vancouver, BC).

The Rag, founded in Austin, Texas, in 1966 by Thorne Dreyer and Carol Neiman, was especially influential. Historian Laurence Leamer called it "one of the few legendary undergrounds," and, according to John McMillian, it served as a model for many papers that followed. The Rag was the sixth member of UPS and the first underground paper in the South and, according to historian Abe Peck, it was the "first undergrounder to represent the participatory democracy, community organizing and synthesis of politics and culture that the New Left of the mid-sixties was trying to develop." Leamer, in his 1972 book The Paper Revolutionaries, called The Rag "one of the few legendary undergrounds". Gilbert Shelton's legendary Fabulous Furry Freak Brothers comic strip began in The Rag, and thanks in part to UPS, was republished all over the world.

Probably the most graphically innovative of the underground papers was the San Francisco Oracle. John Wilcock, a founder of the Underground Press Syndicate, wrote about the Oracle: "Its creators are using color the way Lautrec must once have experimented with lithography – testing the resources of the medium to the utmost and producing what almost any experienced newspaperman would tell you was impossible... it is a creative dynamo whose influence will undoubtedly change the look of American publishing."

In the period 1969–1970, a number of underground papers grew more militant and began to openly discuss armed revolution against the state, some going so far as to print manuals for bombing and urging their readers to arm themselves; this trend, however, soon fell silent after the rise and fall of the Weather Underground and the tragic shootings at Kent State.

==== High school underground press ====
During this period there was also a widespread underground press movement circulating unauthorized student-published tabloids and mimeographed sheets at hundreds of high schools around the U.S. (In 1968, a survey of 400 high schools in Southern California found that 52% reported student underground press activity in their school.) Most of these papers put out only a few issues, running off a few hundred copies of each and circulating them only at one local school, although there was one system-wide antiwar high school underground paper produced in New York in 1969 with a 10,000-copy press run. Houston's Little Red Schoolhouse, a citywide underground paper published by high school students, was founded in 1970.

For a time in 1968–1969, the high school underground press had its own press services: FRED (run by C. Clark Kissinger of Students for a Democratic Society, with its base in Chicago schools) and HIPS (High School Independent Press Service, produced by students working out of Liberation News Service headquarters and aimed primarily but not exclusively at New York City schools). These services typically produced a weekly packet of articles and features mailed to subscribing papers around the country; HIPS reported 60 subscribing papers.

==== G.I. underground press ====
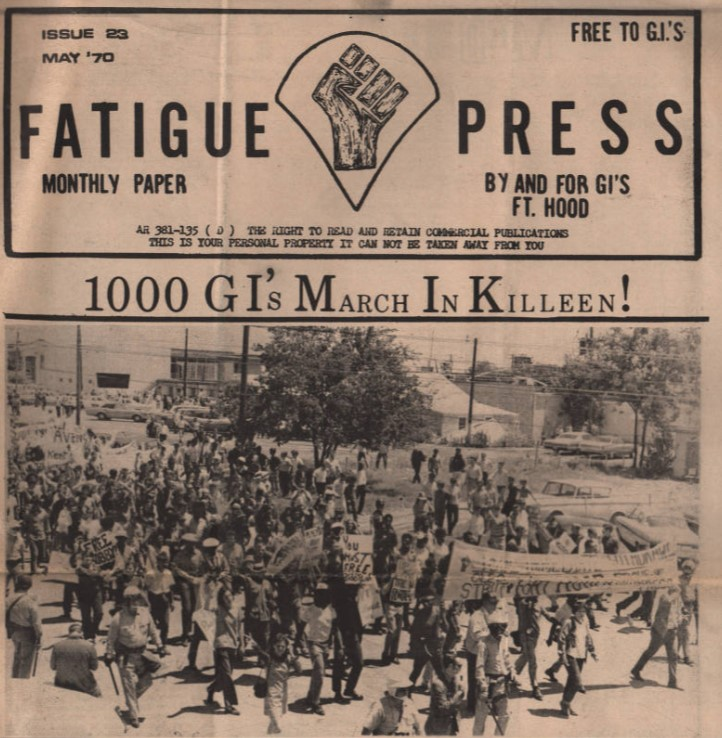
Fatigue Press was created by GIs at the Fort Hood U.S. Army base in Texas.

The GI underground press within the U.S. military produced over four hundred titles during the Vietnam War, some produced by antiwar GI Coffeehouses, and many of them small, crudely produced, low-circulation mimeographed "zines" written by GIs or recently discharged veterans opposed to the war and circulated locally on and off-base. Several GI underground papers had large-scale, national distribution of tens of thousands of copies, including thousands of copies mailed to GI's overseas. These papers were produced with the support of civilian anti-war activists, and had to be disguised to be sent through the mail into Vietnam, where soldiers distributing or even possessing them might be subject to harassment, disciplinary action, or arrest. There were at least two of these papers produced in the combat zone in Vietnam itself, The Boomerang Barb and GI Says.

=== Technological and financial realities ===
The boom in the underground press was made practical by the availability of cheap offset printing, which made it possible to print a few thousand copies of a small tabloid paper for a couple of hundred dollars, which a sympathetic printer might extend on credit. Paper was cheap, and many printing firms around the country had over-expanded during the 1950s and had excess capacity on their offset web presses, which could be negotiated for at bargain rates. (Note: Glessing pins the blame specifically on the Miehle-Goss-Dexter firm, which waged a successful sales campaign in the late 1950s to sell its expensive new high-capacity web-fed offset presses (a full installation cost $100,000) on credit to small newspapers and printing firms across the country which couldn't quite afford them.)

Most papers operated on a shoestring budget, pasting up camera-ready copy on layout sheets on the editor's kitchen table, with labor performed by unpaid, non-union volunteers. Typesetting costs, which at the time were wiping out many established big city papers, were avoided by typing up copy on a rented or borrowed IBM Selectric typewriter to be pasted-up by hand. As one observer commented with only slight hyperbole, students were financing the publication of these papers out of their lunch money.

=== Syndicates and news services ===
In mid-1966, the cooperative Underground Press Syndicate (UPS) was formed at the instigation of Walter Bowart, the publisher of another early paper, the East Village Other. The UPS allowed member papers to freely reprint content from any of the other member papers.

During this period, there were also a number of left-wing political periodicals with concerns similar to those of the underground press. Some of these periodicals joined the Underground Press Syndicate to gain services such as microfilming, advertising, and the free exchange of articles and newspapers. Examples include The Black Panther (the paper of the Black Panther Party, Oakland, California), and The Guardian (New York City), both of which had national distribution.

Almost from the outset, UPS supported and distributed underground comix strips to its member papers. Some of the cartoonists syndicated by UPS included Robert Crumb, Jay Lynch, The Mad Peck's Burn of the Week, Ron Cobb, and Frank Stack. The Rip Off Press Syndicate was launched c. 1973 to compete in selling underground comix content to the underground press and student publications. Each Friday, the company sent out a distribution sheet with the strips it was selling, by such cartoonists as Gilbert Shelton, Bill Griffith, Joel Beck, Dave Sheridan, Ted Richards, and Harry Driggs.

The Liberation News Service (LNS), co-founded in the summer of 1967 by Ray Mungo and Marshall Bloom, "provided coverage of events to which most papers would have otherwise had no access." In a similar vein, John Berger, Lee Marrs, and others co-founded Alternative Features Service, Inc. in 1970 to supply the underground and college press, as well as independent radio stations, with syndicated press materials that especially highlighted the creation of alternative institutions, such as free clinics, people's banks, free universities, and alternative housing.

By 1973, many underground papers had folded, at which point the Underground Press Syndicate acknowledged the passing of the undergrounds and renamed itself the Alternative Press Syndicate (APS). After a few years, APS also foundered, to be supplanted in 1978 by the Association of Alternative Newsweeklies.

=== Controversies ===
One of the most notorious underground newspapers to join UPS and rally activists, poets, and artists by giving them an uncensored voice, was the NOLA Express in New Orleans. Started by Robert Head and Darlene Fife as part of political protests and extending the "mimeo revolution" by protest and freedom-of-speech poets during the 1960s, NOLA Express was also a member of the Committee of Small Magazine Editors and Publishers (COSMEP). These two affiliations with organizations that were often at cross-purposes made NOLA Express one of the most radical and controversial publications of the counterculture movement. Part of the controversy about NOLA Express included graphic photographs and illustrations of which many even in today's society would be banned as pornographic.

Charles Bukowski's syndicated column, Notes of a Dirty Old Man, ran in NOLA Express, and Francisco McBride's illustration for the story "The Fuck Machine" was considered sexist, pornographic, and created an uproar. All of this controversy helped to increase the readership and bring attention to the political causes that editors Fife and Head supported.

=== Harassment and intimidation ===
Many of the papers faced official harassment on a regular basis; local police repeatedly raided and busted up the offices of Dallas Notes and jailed editor Stoney Burns on drug charges; charged Atlanta's Great Speckled Bird and others with obscenity; arrested street vendors; and pressured local printers not to print underground papers.

In Austin, the regents at the University of Texas sued The Rag to prevent circulation on campus but the American Civil Liberties Union successfully defended the paper's First Amendment rights before the U.S. Supreme Court. In an apparent attempt to shut down The Spectator in Bloomington, Indiana, editor James Retherford was briefly imprisoned for alleged violations of the Selective Service laws; his conviction was overturned and the prosecutors were rebuked by a federal judge.

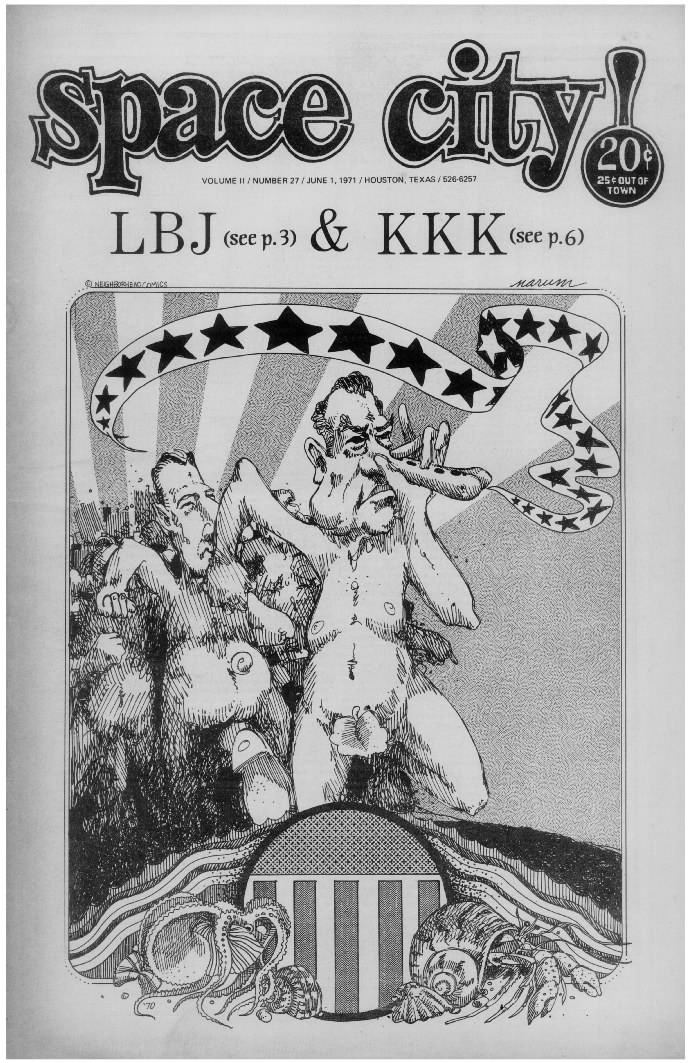
Space City!, April 1, 1971. Art by Bill Narum.

Drive-by shootings, firebombings, break-ins, and trashings were carried out on the offices of many underground papers around the country, fortunately without causing any fatalities. The offices of Houston's Space City! were bombed and its windows repeatedly shot out. In Houston, as in many other cities, the attackers, never identified, were suspected of being off-duty military or police personnel, or members of the Ku Klux Klan or Minuteman organizations.

Some of the most violent attacks were carried out against the underground press in San Diego. In 1976 the San Diego Union reported that the attacks in 1971 and 1972 had been carried out by a right-wing paramilitary group calling itself the Secret Army Organization, which had ties to the local office of the FBI.

The U.S. Federal Bureau of Investigation (FBI) conducted surveillance and disruption activities on the underground press in the United States, including a campaign to destroy the alternative agency Liberation News Service. As part of its COINTELPRO designed to discredit and infiltrate radical New Left groups, the FBI also launched phony underground newspapers such as the Armageddon News at Indiana University Bloomington, The Longhorn Tale at the University of Texas at Austin, and the Rational Observer at American University in Washington, D.C. The FBI also ran the Pacific International News Service in San Francisco, the Chicago Midwest News, and the New York Press Service. Many of these organizations consisted of little more than a post office box and a letterhead, designed to enable the FBI to receive exchange copies of underground press publications and send undercover observers to underground press gatherings.

=== Decline of the underground press ===
By the end of 1972, with the end of the draft and the winding down of the Vietnam War, there was increasingly little reason for the underground press to exist. A number of papers passed out of existence during this time; among the survivors a newer and less polemical view toward middle-class values and working within the system emerged. The underground press began to evolve into the socially conscious, lifestyle-oriented alternative media that currently dominates this form of weekly print media in North America.

In 1973, the landmark Supreme Court decision in Miller v. California re-enabled local obscenity prosecutions after a long hiatus. This sounded the death knell for much of the remaining underground press (including underground comix), largely by making the local head shops which stocked underground papers and comix in communities around the country more vulnerable to prosecution.

The Georgia Straight outlived the underground movement, evolving into an alternative weekly still published today; Fifth Estate survives as an anarchist magazine. The Rag – which was published for 11 years in Austin (1966–1977) – was revived in 2006 as an online publication, The Rag Blog, which now has a wide following in the progressive blogosphere and whose contributors include many veterans of the original underground press.

Given the nature of alternative journalism as a subculture, some staff members from underground newspapers became staff on the newer alternative weeklies, even though there was seldom institutional continuity with management or ownership. An example is the transition in Denver from the underground Chinook, to Straight Creek Journal, to Westword, an alternative weekly still in publication. Some underground and alternative reporters, cartoonists, and artists moved on to work in corporate media or in academia.

=== Lists of underground press papers ===
==== United States ====
More than a thousand underground newspapers were published in the United States during the Vietnam War. The following is a short list of the more widely circulated, longer-lived and notable titles. For a longer, more comprehensive listing sorted by states, see the long list of underground newspapers.

- Ann Arbor Argus, Ann Arbor, Michigan, 1969–1971
- Ann Arbor Sun, Ann Arbor, Michigan, 1971–1976
- Avatar, Boston, Massachusetts, 1967–1968
- Baltimore Free Press, Baltimore, Maryland
- Berkeley Barb, Berkeley, California, 1965–1980
- Berkeley Tribe, Berkeley, California, 1969–1972 (splintered from the Barb)
- The Big Us, Cleveland, Ohio, 1968–1970 (changed name to Burning River News)
- The Black Panther, Oakland, California, 1967–1980
- Boston Free Press, Boston, Massachusetts
- Bugle-American, Milwaukee, Wisconsin, 1970–1978
- Chicago Seed, Chicago, Illinois, 1967–1973
- Chinook, Denver, Colorado, 1969–1972
- Columbus Free Press, Columbus, Ohio, 1969–ongoing
- Connections, Madison, Wisconsin
- Dallas Notes, Dallas, Texas, 1967–1970 (originally Notes from the Underground)
- Distant Drummer, Philadelphia, Pennsylvania, 1967–1979 (changed name to The Drummer)
- Dock of the Bay, San Francisco, California, 1967–1969
- East Village Other, New York, New York, 1965–1972
- Eugene Augur, Eugene, Oregon, 1969–1974
- Extra, Providence, Rhode Island
- Fifth Estate, Detroit, itMichigan, 1965–ongoing
- The Great Speckled Bird, Atlanta, Georgia, 1968–1976
- Good Times, San Francisco, California, 1969–1972 (formerly San Francisco Express–Times)
- Harry, Baltimore, Maryland, 1969–1970
- Helix, Seattle, Washington, 1967–1970
- Hundred Flowers, Minneapolis, Minnesota, 1970–1972
- Illustrated Paper, Mendocino, California, 1966–1967
- Indianapolis Free Press, Indianapolis, Indiana
- Kaleidoscope, Milwaukee, Wisconsin, 1967–1971
- Kudzu, Jackson, Mississippi, 1968–1972
- The Last Times, San Francisco, California, 1967 (Charles Plymell)
- Los Angeles Free Press, Los Angeles, California, 1964–1978 (new series 2005–ongoing)
- Los Angeles Staff, Los Angeles, California (splintered from the Free Press)
- Madison Kaleidoscope, Madison, Wisconsin, 1969–1971
- Middle Earth, Iowa City, Iowa, 1967–1968
- NOLA Express, New Orleans, Louisiana, from 1967
- Northwest Passage, Bellingham, Washington, 1969–1986
- Old Mole, Cambridge, Massachusetts, 1968–1970
- Omaha Kaleidoscope, Omaha, Nebraska, from 1970
- Open City, Los Angeles, California, 1967–1969
- Oracle of Southern California, Los Angeles, California
- The Organ, San Francisco, California, 1970–1971
- Other Scenes, dispatched from various locations around the world
- The Paper, East Lansing, Michigan, from 1965
- Peninsula Observer, Palo Alto, California, 1967–1969 (formerly Midpeninsula Observer)
- Philadelphia Free Press, Philadelphia, Pennsylvania, 1968–1972
- Pittsburgh Fair Witness, Pittsburgh, Pennsylvania, 1970–1973 (formerly Grok)
- Portland Scribe, Portland, Oregon, 1971–????
- Quicksilver Times, Washington, D.C., 1969–1972
- The Rag, Austin, Texas, 1966–1977
- Rising Up Angry, Chicago, Illinois, 1969–1975
- Root, Memphis, Tennessee
- San Antonio Gazette, San Antonio, Texas, 1971–1975
- San Diego Door, San Diego, California, 1966–1970 (previously Good Morning, Teaspoon)
- San Diego Free Press, San Diego, California, 1968–1970 (changed name to Street Journal)
- San Francisco Oracle, San Francisco, California, 1966–1968
- San Jose Maverick, San Jose, California, 1969–1970
- Second City, Chicago, Illinois
- Space City, Houston, Texas, 1969–1972 (originally Space City News)
- The Spectator, Bloomington, Indiana, 1966–1971
- Spokane Natural, Spokane, Washington, 1967–1970
- The Staff, Los Angeles, California, 1970–1973
- Takeover, Madison, Wisconsin, 1971–1978 (formerly Madison Kaleidoscope)
- Tin Whistle, Champaign-Urbana, Illinois, 1968-1969
- Tuesday's Child, Los Angeles, California, 1969–1970
- The Ungarbled Word, New Orleans, Louisiana
- View from the Bottom, New Haven, Connecticut, 1969–1970
- Vortex, Lawrence, Kansas, 1969–1970
- Washington Free Press, Washington, D.C., from 1966
- Willamette Bridge, Portland, Oregon, 1968–1971
- Women's LibeRATion (previously Rat Subterranean News), New York, New York, 1968–1970
- Yarrowstalks, Philadelphia, Pennsylvania, 1967–1975

==== U.S. military G.I. papers ====
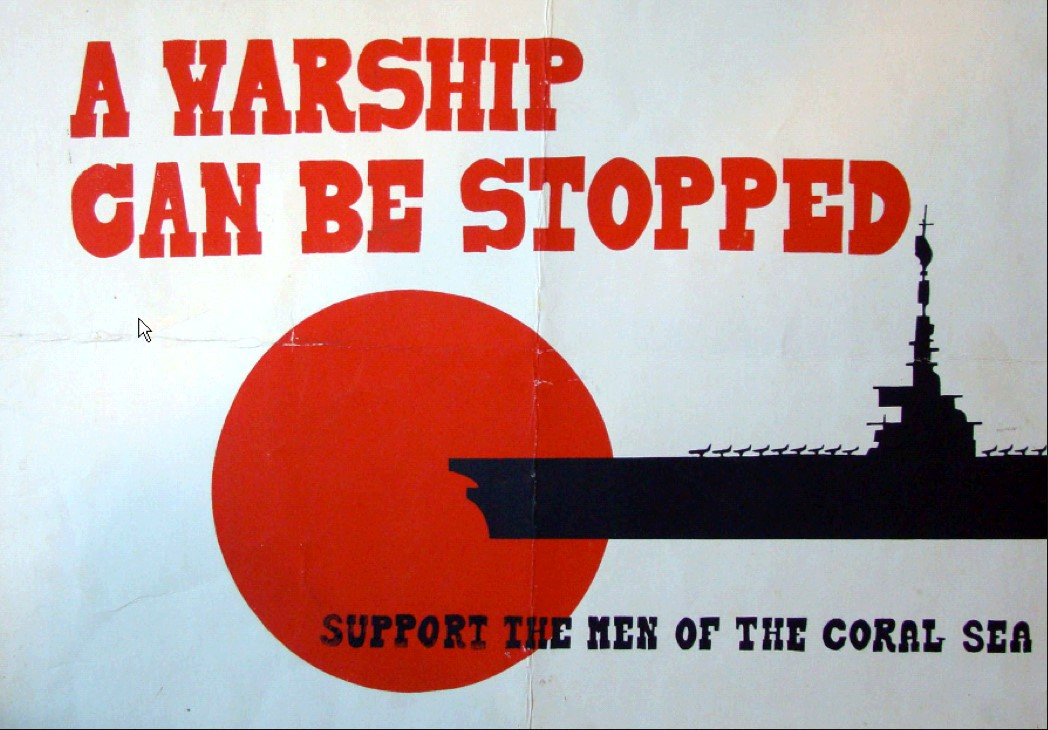
An example of underground GI graphics.

See Table: GI Underground Press During the Vietnam War (U.S. Military)

==== Canada ====
- Canada Goose, Edmonton, Alberta
- The Georgia Straight, Vancouver, British Columbia
- Guerilla, Toronto, Ontario
- Harbinger, Toronto, Ontario
- Logos, Montreal, Quebec
- Loving Couch Press, Winnipeg, Manitoba
- Mainmise (1970–1978), Montreal, Quebec
- Octopus, Ottawa, Ontario (a.k.a. Canadian Free Press, Ottawa's Free Press)
- Pop-See-Cul, Montreal, Quebec
- Sexus (1967–1968), and Allez chier (1969), Montreal, Quebec
- Yorkville Yawn and Satyrday, Yorkville, Toronto, Ontario

== India ==
- Hungry Generation weekly bulletins. Calcutta (1961–1965)

The Hungry Generation was a literary movement in the Bengali language launched by what is known today as the Hungryalist quartet, i.e. Shakti Chattopadhyay, Malay Roy Choudhury, Samir Roychoudhury and Debi Roy (alias Haradhon Dhara), during the 1960s in Kolkata, India. Due to their involvement in this avant garde cultural movement, the leaders lost their jobs and were jailed by the incumbent government. They challenged contemporary ideas about literature and contributed significantly to the evolution of the language and idiom used by contemporaneous artists to express their feelings in literature and painting.

This movement is characterized by expression of closeness to nature and sometimes by tenets of Gandhianism and Proudhonianism. Although it originated at Patna, Bihar and was initially based in Kolkata, it had participants spread over North Bengal, Tripura and Benares. According to Dr. Shankar Bhattacharya, Dean at Assam University, as well as Aryanil Mukherjee, editor of Kaurab Literary Periodical, the movement influenced Allen Ginsberg as much as it influenced American poetry through the Beat poets who visited Calcutta, Patna and Benares during the 1960–1970s. Arvind Krishna Mehrotra, now a professor and editor, was associated with the Hungry generation movement. Shakti Chattopadhyay, Saileswar Ghosh, Subhas Ghosh left the movement in 1964.

More than 100 manifestos were issued during 1961–1965. Malay's poems have been published by Prof P. Lal from his Writers Workshop publication. Howard McCord published Malay Roy Choudhury's controversial poem Prachanda Boidyutik Chhutar i.e., "Stark Electric Jesus from Washington State University" in 1965. The poem has been translated into several languages of the world; into German by Carl Weissner, into Spanish by Margaret Randall, into Urdu by Ameeq Hanfee, into Assamese by Manik Dass, into Gujarati by Nalin Patel, into Hindi by Rajkamal Chaudhary, and into English by Howard McCord.

== In Italy ==
At the beginnings of the Fascist regime, there was «seizure of several copies of the pamphlet “The Matteotti Crime. Why the Opposition Is Not in Chieti”, circulated in Chieti in March 1926 in defense of the judicial truth and of the rights of Hon. Giacomo Matteotti».

During the Republic seizures happened just for so-called reasons of public decency, in these cases:

- Fuori! (Turin)
- Re Nudo (Milan)
- Tampax (Turin)

== In the Netherlands ==
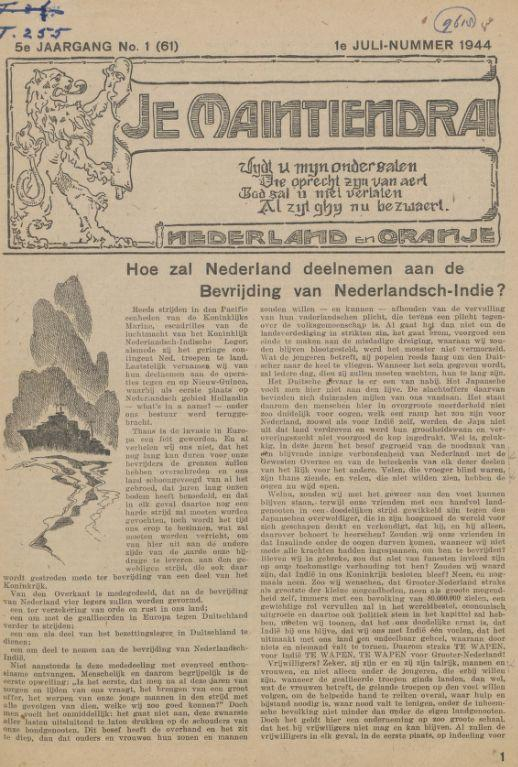
Front page of the Dutch illegal WW2 newspaper Je Maintiendrai from 03-07-1944

Clandestine press in the Netherlands is related to the second World War, which ran from 10 May 1940 until 5 May 1945 in the Netherlands.

- See the list of 1300 Dutch illegal WW2 newspapers on Dutch Wikipedia
- See also on Dutch Wikipedia

- List of places of publication of Dutch illegal WW2 newspapers
- List of printers and publishers of Dutch illegal WW2 newspapers
- List of legally continued Dutch WW2 newspapers

== See also ==
=== General topics ===
- Alternative media
  - Alternative media (U.S. political left)
  - Alternative media (U.S. political right)
- Polish underground press
- Clandestine literature
- Pirate Radio
- News agency (alternative)
- Zines

=== Specific outlets and publications ===
- List of underground newspapers (by country and state)
- List of underground newspapers of the 1960s counterculture

=== Prominent individuals ===
- Marcello Baraghini, Italian alternative editor)
- Jeff Sharlet (Vietnam antiwar activist)
- Giulio Tedeschi, Italian underground activist)
- Andrea Valcarenghi, (co-editor, Italian Re Nudo)
