= Alternative news agency =

News gathering organization

An alternative news agency (or alternative news service) operates similarly to a commercial news agency, but defines itself as an alternative to commercial or "mainstream" operations. They span the political spectrum, but most frequently are progressive or radical left. Sometimes they combine the services of a news agency and a news syndicate. Among the primary clients are alternative weekly newspapers.

Notable alternative news agencies from the past included the Associated Negro Press, the Collegiate Press Service, Liberation News Service, Pacific News Service, and the Mathaba News Agency. Active alternative news services include AlterNet, the Association of Alternative Newsmedia, and Inter Press Service.

The raison d'etre of a 1970s-era service, Community Press Features, nicely summarizes the ethos of the alternative news agency:

The mass media — the metropolitan daily newspapers, television, and radio — are big businesses and are backed, through financing and advertising, by other big businesses. They naturally tend to reflect and report the concerns of large business interests over those of the rest of the population. And although there are at times significant exceptions (usually moments of crisis, when they can't afford not to) they just as naturally hesitate to report on activities and groups which seriously challenge the legitimacy of those same powerful interests. Rarely will they accurately or adequately present those groups' points of view."

== History ==
One of the first alternative news agencies was Associated Negro Press (ANP), founded in 1919 in Chicago by Claude Albert Barnett. Through its regular packets, the ANP supplied African American newspapers with news stories, opinions, columns, feature essays, book and movie reviews, critical and comprehensive coverage of events, personalities, and institutions relevant to black Americans.

The Collegiate Press Service (CPS) began in 1962 as the news agency of the United States Student Press Association (USSPA), supplying material to college and university newspapers. (It was later revealed that CPS was at the time was receiving support and covert financing from the right-wing organizations Reader's Digest and the Central Intelligence Agency.)

The formation of the international journalist cooperative Inter Press Service in 1964 was vital in filling the information gap between Europe and Latin America after the political turbulence following the Cuban Revolution of 1959.

The 1966 formation of the Underground Press Syndicate (UPS) was key to the co-development of the counterculture underground press and alternative news agencies. By June 1967, a UPS conference in Iowa City, Iowa drew 80 underground newspaper editors from the U.S. and Canada, including representatives of Liberation News Service. LNS, founded by Marshall Bloom and Ray Mungo that summer, would play an equally important and complementary role in the growth and evolution of the underground press in the United States.

Two alternative news agencies formed in the late 1960s were notable for their coverage of the Vietnam War. The Dispatch News Service, formed in 1968, was awarded the Pulitzer Prize for International Reporting in 1970 along with writer Seymour Hersh, for his coverage of the My Lai massacre. Similarly, the mission of the Pacific News Service, formed in 1969, was to supply mainstream newspapers with independent expert sources and reporting on the United States' role in Indochina during the war.

The explosive growth of the underground press began to subside by 1970, yet a plethora of alternative news agencies were formed in the period 1971–1973. Only a few of those agencies lasted more than a couple of years, with only two — Earth News Service (ENS) and Zodiac News Service — lasting into the 1980s. Both agencies emerged from the defunct Earth magazine; ENS was later renamed Newscript Dispatch Service. Meanwhile, Jonathan Newhall, another former Earth staffer, formed Zodiac News Service.

The Capitol Hill News Service, established in 1973 as part of Ralph Nader's think tank Public Citizen, was later sold to the States News Service, run by Leland Schwartz.

The left-leaning news agency AlterNet was launched in 1987 with a mission to serve as a clearinghouse for important local stories generated by the members of the Association of Alternative Newsweeklies (itself formed in 1978). At its start, AlterNet created print and electronic mechanisms to syndicate both the works of AAN papers and freelance contributors, among them Michael Moore and Abbie Hoffman.

Alternative news agencies of the 2000s have been mostly characterized as Internet-based news sites (and most have only lasted a couple of years).

== Examples ==
=== Active ===
- AlterNet (from 1987)
- Association of Alternative Newsmedia/AltWeeklies.com (from 1978)
- Inter Press Service (from 1965) — North/South issues
- Syndicated News

=== Defunct ===
==== Pre-1960s ====
- Associated Negro Press (1919–1964)

==== 1960s ====
- Collegiate Press Service (early 1960s–1990s) — originally a student-run project of the United States Student Press Association (Washington, DC); transformed into independent collective (Denver, Colorado) and later a private operation
- Dispatch News Service (1968–1971) — antiwar news agency; the first outlet to purchase Seymour Hersh's story about the My Lai massacre during the Vietnam War; also operated Dispatch News Service International (DNSI)
- Liberation News Service (1967–1981) — splintered off from Collegiate Press Service
- Pacific News Service (1969–2017)
- Underground Press Syndicate (1966–1978) — originally a syndicate but then began operating the Underground Press Service news agency; in 1973 was renamed Alternative Press Syndicate

==== 1970s ====
- Alternative Features Service (AFS) (June 1971–1973) — based in Berkeley; aspired to be the "King Features Syndicate of the Underground press."
- Appalachian News Service (January 1974–1976) — founded by Curtis Seltzer; based in Charleston, West Virginia
- Capitol Hill News Service (1973–1978)
- Community Press Features (1971–mid-1970s) — media group division of the UPA, an urban planning nonprofit established in Boston in 1968
- Earth News Service/Newscript Dispatch Service (April 1972–1980s) — spun off from the defunct Earth magazine; other former Earth staffers started Zodiac News Service and Zoo World Newservice
- FPS (c. 1970–1979) — high school student news service with a sanitized name: "Free Public Schools"; later became the Magazine of Young People's Liberation
- Her Say (1977–c. 1982) — feminist news service founded by Marlene Edmunds and Anne Millner (formerly of Zodiac News Service), as well as Shelley Buck
- New York News Service (c. 1973–1974) — founded by Rex Weiner and Deanne Stillman (Weiner wrote for the East Village Other and founded the New York Ace)
- People's Translation Service (1972–c. 1975)
- Tricontinental News Service (1973–c. 1974)
- Zodiac News Service (1972–1980s)
- Zoo World Newservice (April 1972–May 12, 1973) — founded by Tom Newton, formerly of Earth magazine

==== 1980s–1990s ====
- Mathaba News Agency (1999–c. 2011) — Libyan independent pro-Gaddafi news site
- New Liberation News Service (1990–1993) — "LNS was restarted as New Liberation News Service with Ray Mungo's blessing by a group of younger radical journalists led by Jason Pramas.... They ... publish[ed] NLNS from their offices in Cambridge, Massachusetts...."

==== 2000s ====
- All Headline News (2000–2010)
- Atlantic Free Press (2006–2011)
- Choike.org (c. 2010–c. 2012) — North/South issues; a project of the Third World Institute supported by Hivos and the Mott Foundation
- Compass Direct News (2004–2012) — news agency of The Christian Post
- The International Human Press (2010–c. 2020) — founded as a user-generated news site by college students from Arizona State University, University of Washington, and Tulane University
- OpenReporter (2013–c. 2018)
- Pacific Free Press (2007–c. 2020) — spun off from Atlantic Free Press
- Reggae News Agency (c. 2009)
- Scoop Analytics (2015–c. 2017) — financial news based on social media trends

== See also ==
- Alternative media
