= David Fenton =

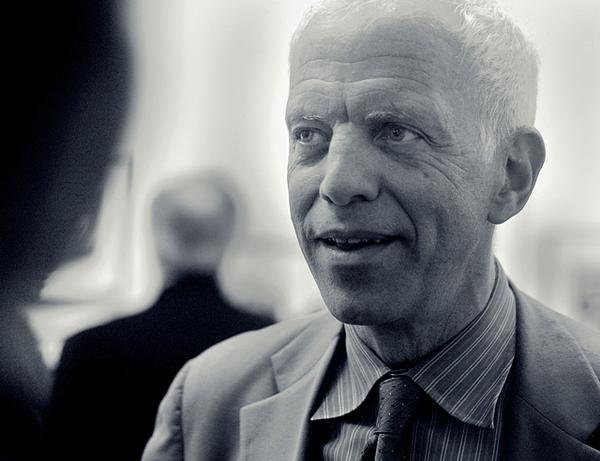
- Born: New York, New York

David Fenton (born 1953) is the Chairman and co-founder of Fenton Communications, created with Robert Pollock in 1982 to promote issue-oriented public relations campaigns focusing on the environment, public health and human rights. Since founding the company, he pioneered the use of professional P.R. and advertising techniques by nonprofit public interest groups in the United States and around the world. The company has offices in New York, Washington, San Francisco and Los Angeles. In 1984, Fenton and Pollock split the company, with Fenton retaining the New York office and Pollock the Washington office.

Fenton also co-founded three independent nonprofit organizations: Environmental Media Services, which coordinated communications activities for environmental groups; New Economy Communications, which works on human rights issues in the global economy; and Death Penalty Information Center, which helps journalists cover evidence of innocence and racial bias in the death penalty. He also helped incubate Climate Nexus, which works with journalists on climate change, and J Street, the pro-Israel, pro-peace group working for a two-state solution.

Fenton was formerly director of Public Relations at Rolling Stone magazine in 1978. He was co-producer of the "No Nukes" concerts with Jackson Browne, Bruce Springsteen, Bonnie Raitt, James Taylor and many others in New York City, 1979. In the late 1960s, he was a photojournalist, for Liberation News Service while also publishing in the NY Times, Life, Newsweek and others. His book of photographs SHOTS: An American Photographer's Journey was published in 2005. Published on November 1, 2022, Fenton's book "The Activist’s Media Handbook" discusses how to organize social media campaigns.

Fenton is a native of New York City. He and his wife divide their time between New York and Berkeley.

In 1989, Fenton was involved in creating what came to be known as the Alar Scare, a campaign to raise fear of the dangers of alar in apples, which led to a crash in apple consumption in the United States. In backlash, there was a proliferation of Food libel laws around the United States. Fenton stated that the goal was to create so many repetitions of NRDC's message that average American consumers would hear it from many different media outlets in a short time. The story then achieved a life of its own and continued to affect policy and consumer habits for some time, while spending very little money. While the Alar Scare and other Fenton projects have been labeled propaganda, Fenton claimed: "I would never say something that wasn’t true about it; that would undermine my ability to be successful. However, any reporter would write a lead paragraph that stresses the most dramatic aspects of the story."

In 1991 apple growers filed a highly publicized lawsuit against Fenton Communications and others for their role in the Alar Scare.

In the 1990s, the Chicago Tribune alleged that Fenton misused Command Trust, an organization of women who had survived toxic breast implants to generate huge amounts of publicity in British tabloids and talk shows over a problem that didn't really exist. Command Trust founder and breast implant survivor Sybil Niden Goldrich refuted these claims, saying that the issues were real and that the stories of sensationalism were false.
