= Jason Pramas =

American journalist (born 1966)

- Born: 1966 (age 59–60); Boston, Massachusetts, U.S.
- Education: The Art Institute of Boston (MFA)
- Occupations: Photojournalist; Artist
- Relatives: Chris Pramas (brother)

Jason Pramas (b. 1966 in Boston, Massachusetts) is an American photojournalist and artist. Pramas is executive director of the Boston Institute for Nonprofit Journalism (BINJ), which he co-founded with Chris Faraone and John Loftus in 2015, and has been editor-in-chief of its independent weekly magazine BINJ.News since it launched in August 2023 (originally as HorizonMass). He was formerly executive editor and associate publisher of the alternative newsweekly DigBoston until it folded in June 2023.

A socialist, and longtime labor and community activist, one of Pramas' first ventures was the alternative news agency New Liberation News Service, restarted with original Liberation News Service co-founder "Ray Mungo's blessing" (which originally operated from 1967 to 1981). Pramas and "a group of younger radical journalists ... publish[ed] NLNS from their offices in Cambridge, Massachusetts." New Liberation News Service operated from 1990 to 1993, according to the biography accompanying the special collection of his publications at Cambridge Public Library. Pramas left to launch As We Are, "a 10,000 circulation for-profit national magazine for working young people" that ran from 1993 to 1996. Pramas then formed Ronin Publishing with his brother Chris Pramas and a mutual friend in early 1996; Jason Pramas left the company before long to focus on journalism.

As executive director of Campaign on Contingent Work, Pramas was the lead organizer of the Boston Social Forum in 2004. In 2008, Pramas founded Open Media Boston, an online metropolitan newsweekly serving the Boston area, serving as its editor/publisher until merging the publication with BINJ.

He holds an MFA in Visual Arts from The Art Institute of Boston, and is noted for curating and participating in the 2014-2015 Boston Strong? art show that criticized the racial overtones of the popular Boston Strong slogan.

He was formerly an assistant professor of communications at Lesley University, but has stated that he believes he lost his job in retaliation for helping lead a successful drive to organize Lesley core faculty into a labor union in 2015.

In 2018, Pramas' column Apparent Horizon won first place in the Political Column category (circulation 40,000 & over) of the annual Association of Alternative Newsmedia Awards.
