= Jeremy Ben-Ami =

American lawyer and activist (born 1962)

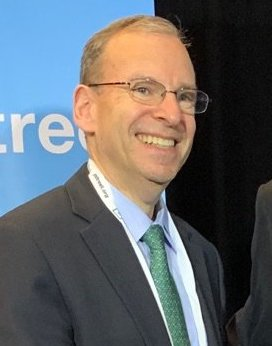

Personal details
- Born: 1962 (age 63–64)
- Party: Democratic
- Spouse: Alisa Biran
- Education: Princeton University (BA); New York University (JD)

Jeremy Ben-Ami (born 1962) is an American lawyer and activist who is the founder and president of J Street, a liberal advocacy organization dedicated to promoting American leadership to end the Arab-Israeli and Israel-Palestinian conflicts peacefully and diplomatically. He is also the executive director of JStreetPAC, which endorses and raises money for federal candidates.

== Early life and education ==
Ben-Ami grew up in New York City. He is the son of the late Eve and the late Yitshaq Ben-Ami. His father was born in Mandatory Palestine, but moved to the United States. Ben-Ami grew up in a Jewish home and became bar mitzvah at Congregation Rodeph Sholom in Manhattan. He attended Collegiate School, also in Manhattan. His grandparents fled persecution in Russia in 1882 and emigrated to "what was then Palestine" and his father would go on to join the Zionist paramilitary group Irgun. His grandparents were among the first Zionist settlers and his father was said to be the first Jewish baby boy born in Tel Aviv.

He graduated from Princeton University and received a Juris Doctor degree from New York University.

== Career ==
Ben-Ami was President Bill Clinton's Deputy Domestic Policy Adviser, and later Policy Director on Howard Dean's presidential campaign. He was most recently Senior Vice President at Fenton Communications. Earlier he was the Communications Director for the New Israel Fund and started the Israeli firm Ben-Or Communications while living in Israel in the late 1990s. Ben-Ami has worked with Jewish peace groups, including the Center for Middle East Peace and the Geneva Initiative-North America.

== Viewpoints ==
In March 2011, Ben-Ami commented:

We are witnessing a troubling trend across the board — with Israelis narrowing the boundaries of what's acceptable on a number of fronts.... There are efforts to narrow the definition of 'who is a Jew' that leaves many non-Orthodox Jews out of the tent, to narrow who can be a citizen by imposing loyalty oaths or other conditions, and now to narrow the definition of who's a friend to only those who agree politically... Israel's goal—as a small state in an unfriendly neighborhood—should be... to broaden not narrow its base of support, and each of these steps take it in the wrong direction.

Ben-Ami's 2011 book, A New Voice for Israel articulates a philosophy and an agenda for pro-Zionist, pro-peace Judaism based on religious and humanist values. He argues for a two-state solution and for U.S. efforts to promote the same. He also analyzes the dynamics and politics of Israel in the U.S. Jewish community. Reviewing the book, Sari Nusseibeh wrote "Ben-Ami provides an arsenal of logistical and moral arguments stressing that not only is Israel's occupation over another people a threat to the Zionist dream and American interests in the region, but that it also runs counter to rabbinic values....". Abraham J. Edelheit found the book's thesis to be one that Peter Beinart had already discussed, and that while Ben-Ami offers convincing evidence that Israeli policies are alienating young Jewish Americans, he fails to "explain how J Street will achieve anything but cementing their criticism of Israel". Joseph Finlay, reviewing for Jewish Quarterly, wrote that Ben-Ami's critique of contemporary American Jewish leadership is "entirely unoriginal" and too gentle and that instead it is necessary to create "massive pressure on Israel to end the occupation, both directly and via national governments across the world. It needs to harness the energy of BDS and pro-Palestinian activists".

=== Views during the Gaza War ===
In 2024, during the Gaza War, Ben-Ami criticized the conduct of the Netanyahu government, calling for de-escalation and echoing J Street's call to end the war. On 3 August 2025, he published an article on his Substack in which he said, "Until now, I have tried to deflect and defend when challenged to call this genocide. I have, however, been persuaded rationally by legal and scholarly arguments that international courts will one day find that Israel has broken the international genocide convention."

== Personal life ==
Ben-Ami married Alisa Biran in 2001. Biran, who was working in fundraising at a music school, happened to be the daughter of a cantor from Ben-Ami's childhood synagogue.
