= American Geosciences Institute =

Nonprofit scientific federation

- Founded: 1948
- Purpose: Earth Science
- Location: Alexandria, VA
- Method: Science, partnerships, information services, nonpartisan policy
- President: David Wunsch
- Staff: 50+
- Website: americangeosciences.org

The American Geosciences Institute (AGI) is a nonprofit federation of about 50 geoscientific and professional organizations that represents geologists, geophysicists, and other earth scientists. The organization was founded in 1948. The organization's offices are in Alexandria, Virginia. The name of the organization was changed from the American Geological Institute on October 1, 2011.

== History ==
Since 1966, AGI has produced GeoRef, a literature database for those studying the earth sciences. AGI operates the Center for Geosciences and Society.

AGI's monthly magazine Geotimes became EARTH Magazine on September 1, 2008, with an increased focus on public communication of geoscience research. In April 2019, EARTH Magazine suspended publication and was folded into Nautilus Quarterly.

== Activities ==
The stated mission of AGI is to "represent and serve the geoscience community by providing collaborative leadership and information to connect Earth, science, and people". GeoRef offers a variety of specialized databases for researchers, educators, and students in specific areas of geoscience. AGI offers lessons and curricula designed for teachers of Earth sciences in schools (K-12). These educational resources are created in partnership with geological organizations whose work is related to Earth science concepts. Every year in the second full week of October, AGI runs Earth Science Week, to promote understanding of Earth science and stewardship of the planet.

The Geological Society of America (GSA) and the National Cooperative Geological Mapping Program of the U.S. Geological Survey hold the Annual Best Student Geologic Map Competition to bring together student geologic mappers from around the world.

== See also ==
- List of geoscience organizations
- Earth magazine from the 1970s
