= Liberation News =

Liberation News may refer to:

- Liberation News Service, a 1970s US underground press for anti-war leftists
- Liberation News, a publication of the Party for Socialism and Liberation
