= Atlantic Free Press =

Dutch political news website

- Website type: News commentary, editorials
- Available in: English
- Dissolved: 14 October 2011
- Owners: Free Press Group - V.O.F. Expathos, Groningen, Netherlands
- Creator: Richard Kastelein,
- Website: www.atlanticfreepress.com
- Commercial: Non-Commercial
- Registration: Optional
- Launched: 2006
- Current status: Closed

Atlantic Free Press, an online political website, was founded in September 2006 by Publisher Richard Kastelein of V.O.F. Expathos, in Groningen, Netherlands and published over 13,000 articles from over 250 progressive writers worldwide until it closed in October 2011.

The publication's website described its mission was "to dig out nuggets of truth from the slag-heap of lies, ignorance and witless diversion that has buried public discourse today. AF Press provides a new venue for disseminating hard news and insightful, fact-based analysis of the harsh realities too often ignored or distorted by the mainstream press."

One of the chief pipelines they claimed to use to disseminate the work was Google News but they also syndicated to LexisNexis, Ebsco, and other networks via a deal with Newstex.

This site has sister publications at the Free Press Group - Pacific Free Press, Chris Floyd - Empire Burlesque and Gorilla Radio which contains over 100 progressive podcasts by Pacific Free Press editor Chris Cook. Atlantic Free Press is a member of the Advertise Liberally Network at Blogads.

Atlantic Free Press has a library of hundreds of photoshops created from 2006 to 2008. Atlantic Free Press photoshop art was used by the University of California Davis, for the Center For the Study of Human Rights in the Americas.

According to the authors' list, 20 percent of the contributors are educated to Ph.D. level.

Atlantic Free Press was also covered in Killer Startups in 2008.

== Contributors ==
Atlantic Free Press contributors included Ansar Abbasi, Nafeez Mosaddeq Ahmed, Shahid Alam, Gilad Atzmon, Joe Bageant, Medea Benjamin, William Blum, Walter Brasch, Helena Cobban, Marjorie Cohn, Juan Cole, Linh Dinh, Will Durst, Tom Engelhardt, Richard A. Falk, Mike Ferner, George Galloway, Chellis Glendinning, Stan Goff, Jerome Grossman, Michael Haas, Dahr Jamail, Robert Jensen, Dennis Jett, Larry C. Johnson, Tony Karon, Richard Kastelein, Naomi Klein, Paul Krassner, James Howard Kunstler, Faisal Kutty, Jason Leopold, Dave Lindorff, Mahmood Mamdani, Eric Margolis, Cynthia McKinney, Mark Crispin Miller, Ed Naha, Ezra Nawi, Sean Penn, James Petras, Kevin Pina, James Ridgeway, Kenneth Ring, Yvonne Ridley, Paul William Roberts, David Rovics, Danny Schechter, Jules Siegel, Norman Solomon, David Swanson, Rodrigue Tremblay, Roland Michel Tremblay, Deepak Tripathi, and Harvey Wasserman.

== Closing ==
Atlantic Free Press closed on Friday 14 October 2011. The editor-in-chief, Richard Kastelein, cited financial burden and personal time limitations as reasons for the closing. At the time of closing, the Atlantic Free Press had published over 13,000 articles.
