= Suya Joint =

Restaurant information
- Established: 2012
- Chef: Cecelia Lizotte
- Food type: Nigerian
- Location: Boston, Massachusetts, United States
- Website: https://www.suyajoint.com/

Suya Joint is a restaurant chain based in Boston, Massachusetts. It specializes in serving Nigerian food. The restaurant is owned and was founded by Cecelia Lizotte in 2012. It won three Best of Boston awards by the Boston Magazine. Lizotte was a semifinalist of the 2024 James Beard award for Best Chef.
