= Inquisition v. City of Charlotte =

Inquisition v. City of Charlotte is a landmark First Amendment decision.

The Inquisition was an underground newspaper produced by East Mecklenburg High School students and their various contributors bi-monthly in Charlotte, North Carolina from April 1968 to late 1969.

== Background ==
The Inquisition
- Cover of volume II issue 3 of Inquisition (1969)
- Format: Magazine-style
- School: East Mecklenburg High School
- Founder(s): Lee Douglas, Hanson Dunbar, Lynwood Sawyer, Russell Schwarz, and Tom Wilkinson
- Launched: April 1968
- Ceased publication: 1969
- Language: English
- Headquarters: Charlotte, North Carolina
- OCLC number: 1644632

The Inquisition was an underground newspaper produced by high school students—mostly attending East Mecklenburg High School—and their various friends bi-monthly in Charlotte, North Carolina from April 1968 to late 1969. Inquisition was the first Underground Press Syndicate member from the U.S. South and a member of Liberation News Service. Copies of Inquisition can be found in 15 university libraries.

After a first issue of only 81, the magazine went to 450 then doubled again by the third issue. By its final issues, the newspaper inspired emotional rejections by parents and became an underground icon for teens.

Inquisition reporters are rumored to have taped one of Jimi Hendrix's last concerts for issue #3.

== Superior Court case ==
The paper was the subject of a landmark First Amendment case, "Inquisition vs City of Charlotte", pitting freedom of the press against a city zoning ordinance from March to May 1969. The case, which was partially decided by placing the sound of the paper's small printer against the sound of a power mower, was found in favor of Inquisition.

== Revisiting ==
Inquisition was revisited by way of an interview with two founders, Russell Schwarz and Lynwood Sawyer, with scholar Suzanne Sink and host Michael Collins on WFAE's Charlotte Talks on November 10, 2010, and rebroadcast on January 16, 2012.

Inquisition's story was featured in a retrospective on the year 1968 in Charlotte Magazine September 2013.

== See also ==
- List of underground newspapers of the 1960s counterculture
