= Zodiac News Service =

- Company type: News agency
- Industry: Underground press
- Founded: August 1972; 54 years ago in San Francisco
- Founders: Jon Newhall
- Defunct: c. 1981
- Fate: Defunct
- Headquarters: Howard Street, San Francisco
- Area served: United States
- Products: News bulletins, photographs

Zodiac News Service was an alternative news agency for radio stations and counterculture media. It was founded in 1972 by Jon Newhall, who had worked at the short-lived Earth News, a service of Earth magazine.

== Overview ==
Zodiac News Service was an alternative national news source founded in 1972 by former Earth News staffer Jon Newhall. (Newhall was the son of Scott Newhall, owner of The Newhall Signal and former long-time editor of the San Francisco Chronicle; and Ruth Newhall, "Chronicle reporter who later became editor of The Signal herself.")

The Zodiac News Service’s mission was to provide reliable news, produced according to journalistic ethics and standards, to outlets seeking sources of news not reported in the mainstream media. Zodiac News Service produced daily packets of anti-Vietnam War, civil rights, environment, marijuana, women’s issues, and rock and roll news — also man bites dog items that Newhall called "bizarros." Subscribers included FM and college radio stations, newspapers, and alternative weeklies across the United States and Canada. At its height, Zodiac News Service was carried by hundreds of news outlets.

The Zodiac staff printed the packets in their office on Howard Street in the then low-rent, south-of-market area of San Francisco. Monday through Friday, the staff would choose stories from local and national publications along with original pieces. The articles would be typed up and then run through a mimeograph machine, followed by a collator. The packets were stuffed into envelopes, run through a postage machine, and driven to the post office for delivery to subscribers.

Staff at Zodiac News Service went on to found various publications. In 1977, Zodiac staffers Marlene Edmunds and Anne Millner formed Her Say, a feminist alternative news service, along with Shelley Buck. Zodiac News Service distributed the Her Say dispatches. By 1980, Her Say had over 100 radio subscribers, as well as print outlets like Ms. and Mother Jones.

John S. Farley was the first general manager of Zodiac News Service. In 1978, Zodiac News Service staff member Bill Hartman co-founded the San Francisco Bay Times, the first LGBTQ newspaper founded jointly by gay men and women. The paper continues today as a multiplatform publication.

Both Zodiac and Her Say lasted into the early 1980s.
