= Return of the Wu and Friends =

Mixtape by DJ Mathematics and Wu-Tang
- Released: February 16, 2010
- Genre: Hip-hop
- Length: 59:23
- Label: Gold Dust Media
- Producer: DJ Mathematics

Return of the Wu and Friends is a mixtape by American DJ Mathematics based on Wu-Tang Clan material from the 2000s. It was released on February 16, 2010 via Gold Dust Media.

== Critical reception ==
Professional ratings
Aggregate scores
Source	Rating
Metacritic	68/100
Review scores
Source	Rating
AllMusic	3.5/5 stars
Now	3/5 Ns
Pitchfork	3.2/10
PopMatters	7/10
RapReviews	7.5/10
The Boston Phoenix	3/4 stars
Urb	4/5 stars

Return of the Wu and Friends was met with generally favorable reviews from music critics. At Metacritic, which assigns a normalized rating out of 100 to reviews from mainstream publications, the album received an average score of 68 based on eight reviews.

Clayton Purdom of Urb praised the album, stating: "Mathematics' more traditional drumwork keeps this distinct from a RZA production and provides a surprisingly snappy cohesion to the whole affair". Steve 'Flash' Juon of RapReviews concluded: "there's nothing wrong with the 15 songs chosen for this per se, especially given that to some degree the material chosen is from more obscure Wu releases or remixes that haven't gotten wide exposure. That said a dedicated hardcore Wu fan could easily compile 90% of this album out of their own collection". Chris Faraone of The Boston Phoenix resumed: "Mathematics conjures a distinct Wu melancholy that outsiders can only imitate. Most impressive here, however, is Method Man". AllMusic's David Jeffries wrote: "as fringe collections go, it is worthwhile, especially for fans of Mathematics. Just don't be surprised when the faithful turn against the set: they already have too many "pretty good" comps to choose from". Saxon Baird of PopMatters stated: "Mathematics' intentions, evidently, was to put together a fun, lively compilation of some ill Wu-Tang related tracks, regardless of what album they appeared on or who was flowing on them. In that, he succeeded. The only drawbacks of Return to the Wu are its necessity and format".

In his mixed review for Now, Jason Richards noted: "anyone who's followed Wu-Tang throughout this millennium knows that the Clan's DJ Mathematics is the proper heir to RZA's Wu production throne, and his new compilation only reinforces this....One issue: at least half of the album is recycled".

In negative reviews, Ian Cohen of Pitchfork called it "the sequel to the Wu family record nobody wanted in the first place explores the post-The W, pre-8 Diagrams Wu dead zone", summing up with "it's a shame to waste the term "spectacular" on such a mundanely depressing, blatant cash-in".

== Track listing ==
No.	Title	Length
1.	"Clap 2010" (Exclusive Mix)	2:42
2.	"Respect 2010" (Exclusive Mix)	3:41
3.	"It's What It Is"	3:21
4.	"Strawberries & Cream"	4:05
5.	"Station ID Break" (Exclusive Mix)	2:13
6.	"All Flowers" (Exclusive Mix)	4:00
7.	"John 3:16"	3:15
8.	"Treez"	3:45
9.	"What It Is"	3:37
10.	"Iron God Chamber"	3:43
11.	"Real Nillaz"	4:57
12.	"Rush"	3:53
13.	"Da Way We Were"	4:29
14.	"Early Grave" (Exclusive Mix)	2:45
15.	"Keep Pace" (Exclusive Mix)	4:32
16.	"Spotlite" (Original Mix)	4:25
Total length:		59:23

== Charts ==
Chart (2010)	Peak position
US Billboard 200	192
US Top R&B/Hip-Hop Albums (Billboard)	36
US Top Rap Albums (Billboard)	12
US Independent Albums (Billboard)	24
