= Cambodia, Pol Pot, and the United States =

1991 book by Michael Haas

- Author: Michael Haas
- Publisher: Praeger Publishers
- Publication date: 1991
- Pages: 184
- ISBN: 0-275-94005-5
- OCLC: 22952522
- Dewey Decimal: 327.730596 20
- LC Class: E183.8.C15 H3 1991

Cambodia, Pol Pot, and the United States: The Faustian Pact is a 1991 book by Michael Haas, then professor of political science at the University of Hawaii. Published with the end of the Cold War, the book analyzed the United States support for Pol Pot and the Khmer Rouge against Soviet-backed Vietnam.

In a review published in Political Science Quarterly, Douglas Pike criticized the book as a "political tract thinly disguised as a study in political science".
