= United States Student Press Association =

National organization of campus newspapers and editors

- Type: Journalism association
- Industry: Student publications
- Founded: c. 1962
- Defunct: c. 1971
- Fate: Defunct
- Headquarters: Washington, D.C., US
- Area served: United States
- Key people: Roger Ebert (1963–1964); Marshall Bloom (1967)
- Parent: National Student Association
- Subsidiaries: Collegiate Press Service

The United States Student Press Association (USSPA) was a national organization of campus newspapers and editors active in the 1960s. A program of the National Student Association (NSA), the USSPA formed a national news agency for college publications called Collegiate Press Service (which eventually spun off on its own, lasting until the late 1990s).

Based in Washington, D.C., the USSPA held a national convention of college student newspaper staff each summer at a member college campus, and a national student editors conference in Washington each year during the academic year.

It was later revealed that the USSPA was underwritten by clandestine funding from the CIA and right-wing organizations like Reader's Digest.

In 1967 journalist Marshall Bloom was designated as heir apparent to USSPA's executive director position, but his push to send student editors to Cuba and defy the U.S. travel ban led the incumbent executive director and other national staff to withdraw their endorsement and support. Bloom sought to win the position at USSPA's annual meeting in Minneapolis in August 1967 but lost a close vote of all student editor representatives to another candidate.

As a result of the vote, Bloom was purged from the USSPA. Soon afterward, Bloom and his colleague Ray Mungo formed the alternative news agency Liberation News Service.

USSPA later became independent, then suffered financial setbacks in the early 1970s, and disbanded.

== Notable members ==
- Roger Ebert served as the second president of the USSPA in 1963–64
- Harry Nussdorf, of Queens College, City University of New York, served as chair of the USSPA National Executive Board 1969–1970
