= Chris Shuptrine =

Chris Shuptrine (born June 28, 1985) is an American author and humorist. He has held recurring humor columns for many local newspapers, including the University of Virginia's The Cavalier Daily and The Declaration, Charlottesville's The Daily Progress, and Greater Boston's Dig Boston.

Most recently, he is an Amazon published author. His first book was entitled, Work Survival Guide: Secret Tips to the Job Search, Working, and Other Activities Best Done Naked.

Notable influences include Dave Barry, Andy Rooney, Calvin Trillin, and Italo Calvino.

Christopher Lee Shuptrine was born in Charlottesville, Virginia, United States, to John Shuptrine and Kelly Shuptrine. He moved to Lynchburg, Virginia at age four. He earned a Bachelor of Arts in English from the University of Virginia in 2008. He currently lives in Boston, Massachusetts.

He is also the creator of Post-Grad Pre-Dad, a humor series dedicated to adults in their twenties.

== Works ==
- Work Survival Guide: Secret Tips to the Job Search, Working, and Other Activities Best Done Naked
