= Underground Press Syndicate =

Network of countercultural newspapers and magazines

- Type: Syndication
- Founded: 1966; 60 years ago
- Founders: Walter Bowart, John Wilcock, Art Kunkin, Max Scherr, Michael Kindman, and Harvey Ovshinsky
- Defunct: c. 1978
- Fate: Defunct
- Successor: Alternative Press Syndicate (APS)
- Area served: United States, Canada & Europe
- Key people: Tom Forcade
- Products: Underground Press Service
- Subsidiaries: APSmedia

The Underground Press Syndicate (UPS), later known as the Alternative Press Syndicate (APS), was a network of countercultural newspapers and magazines that operated from 1966 into the late 1970s. As it evolved, the Underground Press Syndicate created an Underground Press Service, and later its own magazine.

UPS members agreed to allow all other members to freely reprint their contents, to exchange gratis subscriptions with each other, and to occasionally print a listing of all UPS newspapers with their addresses. Anyone who agreed to those terms was allowed to join the syndicate. As a result, countercultural news stories, criticism, and cartoons were widely disseminated, and a wealth of content was available to even the most modest start-up paper.

Shortly after the formation of the UPS, the number of underground papers throughout North America expanded dramatically. A UPS roster published in November 1966 listed 14 underground papers — a 1971 roster listed 271 UPS-affiliated papers in the United States, Canada, and Europe. The underground press' combined readership eventually reached into the millions.

For many years the Underground Press Syndicate was run by Tom Forcade, who later founded High Times magazine.

== History ==
=== Formation ===
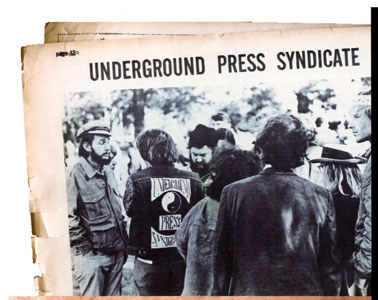
First gathering of member papers, the Underground Press Syndicate, Stinson Beach, CA, March 1967.

The Underground Press Syndicate was initially formed by the publishers of five early underground papers: the East Village Other (New York City), the Los Angeles Free Press, the Berkeley Barb, The Paper (East Lansing, Michigan), and Fifth Estate (Detroit, Michigan).

The first official UPS gathering was held at the home of the San Francisco Oracle's Michael Bowen in Stinson Beach, California, in March 1967, with some 30 people representing a half-dozen papers in attendance.

The meeting was chaotic and largely symbolic, and the concept was amorphous. It was hoped that the syndicate would sell national advertising space that would run in all five papers, but this never happened. As Thorne Dreyer and Victoria Smith wrote for Liberation News Service (LNS), the formation of UPS was designed "to create the illusion of a giant coordinated network of freaky papers, poised for the kill". But, they added, "this mythical value was to be extremely important: the shoes could be grown into," and the emergence of UPS helped to create a sense of national community and to make the papers feel less isolated in their efforts.

Walter Bowart and John Wilcock of the East Village Other, with Michael Kindman of The Paper, took the lead in inviting other papers to join. The San Francisco Oracle, The Rag, and the Illustrated Paper (a psychedelic paper published in Mendocino, California) joined soon afterward, and membership grew rapidly in 1967 as new papers were founded (such as the Chicago Seed) and immediately joined. First-hand coverage of the 1967 Detroit riots in Fifth Estate was one example of material that was widely copied in other papers of the syndicate.

The first paper in the deep South to join was The Inquisition (Charlotte, North Carolina). Fluxus West, a Fluxus offshoot mostly engaged in mail art and self-publishing activities, founded by Ken Friedman, was also one of the newest UPS members in 1967. (Note: Friedman stated: "Fluxus West, for example, was one of the six or seven founding publishers of the Underground Press Syndicate in 1967, but we never gained any traction on the way the papers were designed or what they dealt with. Even though we can be found in the first lists of founding papers, along with the East Village Other, the Berkeley Barb, and the Los Angeles Free Press, we vanish from history soon after because our focus was so vastly different. Did we exert a role in developing the concept of an alternate press? Yes. Did we have any real part in the way the press developed? Perhaps we did, at least in a small way. Did we succeed in directing serious attention to cultural issues beyond the standard underground press focal points of rock music, drugs, sex, and new left politics? Not hardly".)

=== Expansion ===
By June 1967, a UPS conference in Iowa City hosted by Middle Earth drew 80 newspaper editors from the U.S. and Canada, including representatives of Liberation News Service. LNS, founded by Marshall Bloom and Ray Mungo that summer, would play an equally important and complementary role in the growth and evolution of the underground press in the United States.

An attempt that summer by Bob Rudnick to coordinate and centralize the UPS at the offices of the East Village Other in New York City failed.

=== Forcade assumes leadership ===
Soon after, Tom Forcade took leadership of the organization, opening an office on West 10th Street in New York City, at which UPS curated the underground press collection for regular microfilming as well as publishing the UPS News Service.

Offices were relocated to Miami during the summer of 1972 to cover the Democratic and Republican Conventions, both of which were held in that city that summer.

By the fall of 1973, the syndicate's offices were located at 283 West 11th Street. The magazine's post office box was Box 386, Cooper Station, New York, NY.

Under Forcade's leadership, UPS would later also publish the Underground Press Revue.

=== The UPS and the women's liberation movement ===
As the underground press movement evolved, women's liberation, initially a non-issue in the male-dominated underground press, became an increasing focus. The UPS passed the following resolutions at its 1969 conference:

1. That male supremacy and chauvinism be eliminated from the contents of the underground papers. For example, papers should stop accepting commercial advertising that uses women's bodies to sell records and other products, and advertisements for sex, since the use of sex as a commodity specially oppresses women in this country. Also, women's bodies should not be exploited in the papers for the purpose of increasing circulation.
2. That papers make a particular effort to publish material on women's oppression and liberation with the entire contents of the paper.
3. That women have a full role in all the functions of the staffs of underground papers.

These resolutions were a harbinger of staff rebellions by women that split several papers, including Rat, where the feminist faction seized control of the paper for several issues. A few papers, already weakened by staff burnout, poor finances, and other factors, died in the wake of these schisms, while others lost revenue and circulation by barring sexual content and advertisements, which in any event were increasingly being spun off into tabloid sex papers like Screw.

=== Underground comix ===
Almost from the outset, the Underground Press Syndicate supported and distributed underground comix strips. Cartoonists and strips syndicated by the organization included Robert Crumb, Jay Lynch, Ron Cobb, Frank Stack, and The Mad Peck's Burn of the Week.

Meanwhile, other cartoonists whose work appeared in UPS-member papers, such as the East Village Other and the Berkeley Barb, saw their work widely distributed, eventually leading to success in the underground comix industry. Ironically, however, reprints became popular with publishers because underground artists originally had few claims on their own work. The open-ended permissions given by UPS were exploited by some underground comix publishers, bulking up or entirely filling their own magazines with work whose creators didn't receive any payment even when those publishers made a profit.

=== UPS becomes the Alternative Press Syndicate ===
The explosive growth of the underground press had begun to subside by 1970, and by 1973 the boom was clearly over. After a 1973 meeting of member newspapers in Boulder, Colorado, the name of the syndicate was changed to the Alternative Press Syndicate (APS).

APS members sorely needed revenues, and in 1973, Richard Lasky, ex-Rolling Stone Magazine Advertising Director of the successful San Francisco-based weekly, and Sheldon (Shelly) Schorr of Concert Magazine, published in several cities, created a national advertising media selling company, APSmedia.

APSmedia placed advertising primarily from record and stereo companies with success, placing more than 350 pages of advertising for many of the publications in the bigger markets in the first year. As cities were in the major markets, it mostly sold ads into publications without the advertisers knowing anything more than the names of the client papers. In 1976, APSmedia dissolved.

=== Dissolution ===
By 1974 most underground newspapers in the U.S. had ceased publication. APS limped along but had gone defunct by 1978; succeeded almost immediately by the Association of Alternative Newsweeklies, founded in Seattle.

Although many of the members of the Underground Press Syndicate/Alternative Press Syndicate were founded when the legendary urban underground papers were already dead or dying, their influence resonated through the 1970s and beyond, both in the proliferation of urban alternative weeklies and in scores of eclectic papers founded in small towns and suburbs. For example, Long Island's Moniebogue Press and Suffolk StreetPapers offered general audiences alternative perspectives on local news and culture, while Akwesasne Notes (published 1968–1992, 1995–c. 1997) specialized in Native American politics, including issues of peace and ecology.

== See also ==
- Counterculture of the 1960s
- List of underground newspapers of the 1960s counterculture
- Ray Mungo
- Rip Off Press Syndicate
- Thorne Dreyer
- Underground press
