= DigBoston =

Alternative newspaper

- Type: Alternative newspaper
- Format: Tabloid
- Owner: Dig Media Group
- Publisher: John Loftus
- Editor: Chris Faraone, Jason Pramas
- Founded: 1999
- Ceased publication: 2023
- Language: English
- Headquarters: Boston, Massachusetts, United States
- Circulation: 39,000 (as of June 2014)
- Website: digboston.com

DigBoston—formerly known as the Weekly Dig and colloquially as The Dig—was a free alternative newspaper in Boston, Massachusetts. It covered news in the Greater Boston area and offers commentary on music, arts, politics, business, film, sex, food, drink and more, as well as providing local bar, entertainment and club listings. DigBoston was distributed Thursdays, free of charge, in self-serve newspaper dispensers located throughout the city, as well as in local businesses.

== History ==
The Weekly Dig was founded in September 1999, by Jeff Lawrence, Joe Bonni and Craig Kapilow. Previously, Lawrence had published a monthly magazine called Shovel founded in 1997. Bonni had run The Pit Report a regional monthly rock and roll magazine from 1992 - 1995 and had worked in advertising at The Boston Phoenix where he was also a freelance writer. Shovel discontinued publishing in the Spring of 2000, when it became an insert to the Weekly Dig.

In September 2003, Lawrence moved to change the editorial direction by dismissing founding Editor Joe Bonni. Assistant Editor (and junior partner) Seth McM. Donlin was named interim editor; Joe Keohane was appointed the replacement editor later in 2003.

In October 2004, Boston magazine publisher Metrocorp announced that it bought a majority stake in the Weekly Dig. Metrocorp, which had operated Boston magazine since 1971 at the time, was also publishing Elegant Wedding, Concierge, Home & Garden and New England Travel and Life. It had also been operating Philadelphia since 1946.

Three months later, in January 2005, the paper went through a relaunch that offered a new, updated design and broader content. Since then, its circulation has more than doubled to about 70,000 copies distributed weekly.

In May, 2007, Lawrence announced that he had purchased the paper back from Metrocorp in what both sides called "an amicable divorce".

In 2009, Arts and Entertainment Editor David Day was made editor-in-chief. Shortly thereafter, the name Weekly Dig was dropped, and the organization was re-branded as DigBoston, featuring a completely overhauled website, DigBoston.com. Day left in 2012, and the new editor was former Managing Editor J. Patrick Brown.

When the Boston Phoenix folded in March 2013, DigBoston became the area's only remaining alt-weekly publication. A new staff was installed, including Dan McCarthy (editor), Chris Faraone (news and features editor), Susanna Jackson (arts and entertainment editor), Kris Jenson (associate film editor), Sean Maloney (staff writer), and Marc Shepard (associate publisher).

DigBoston was acquired by Dig Media Group in June 2017. The new owners and top staff were Marc Sneider (publisher), Chris Faraone (editor-in-chief and associate publisher), Jason Pramas (executive editor and associate publisher), and John Loftus (business manager and associate publisher).

In September 2018, Dig Media Group announced that Marc Sneider had stepped down as publisher and that its board of directors "elected DigBoston Business Manager (and former Associate Publisher) John Loftus to be the new publisher”.

In June 2023, DigBoston stopped publication after being unable to recover from "the pandemic economy."
