= Allen Young (writer) =

American journalist (born 1941)

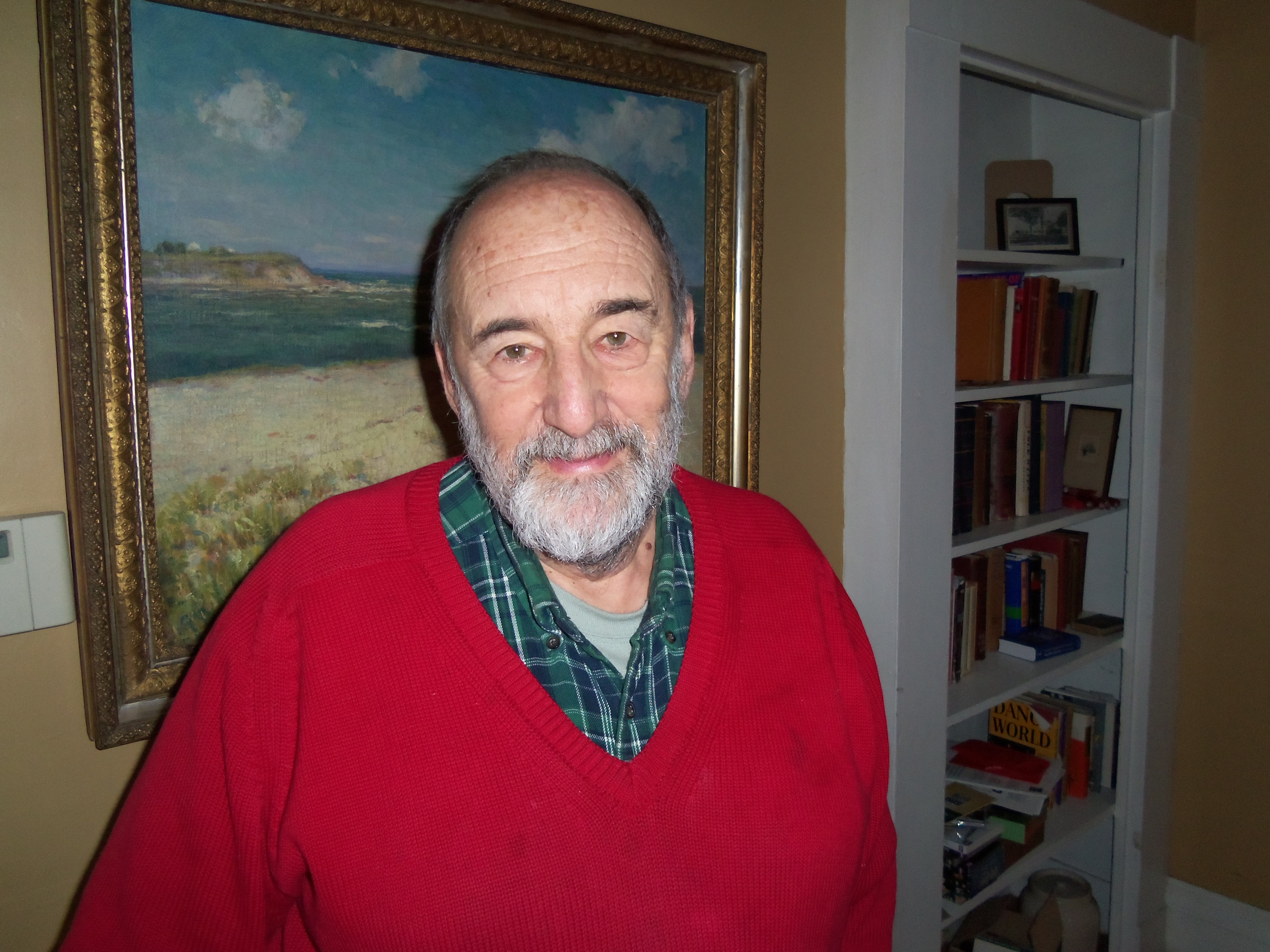
- Born: June 30, 1941 (age 85); Liberty, New York, U.S.
- Education: Columbia University (BA, MS); Stanford University (MA)
- Occupations: Journalist, author, editor
- Writing career
- Subjects: Anti-war movement LGBT issues in Cuba
- Literary movement: Counterculture of the 1960s

Allen Young (born June 30, 1941) is an American journalist, author, editor and publisher who is also a social, political and environmental activist.

== Early life ==
Allen Young was born in Liberty, New York, on June 30, 1941, to Rae (Goldfarb) Young and Louis Young. His parents, both secular Jews, spent their youth in New York City, then relocated to the hamlet of Glen Wild (estimated pop. 100) in Fallsburg in the foothills of the Catskills, and started a poultry farm, also providing accommodations for summer tourists in this region known as the Borscht Belt. He was a red diaper baby. He graduated from Fallsburg Central High School and received his undergraduate degree in 1962 from Columbia College, Columbia University. Following an M.A. in 1963 from Stanford University in Hispanic American and Luso-Brazilian Studies, he earned an M.S. in 1964 from the Columbia University Graduate School of Journalism. After receiving a Fulbright Award in 1964, Young spent three years in Brazil, Chile and other Latin American countries, contributing numerous articles to The New York Times, The Christian Science Monitor and other periodicals.

== Activism ==
=== Liberation News Service and protest ===
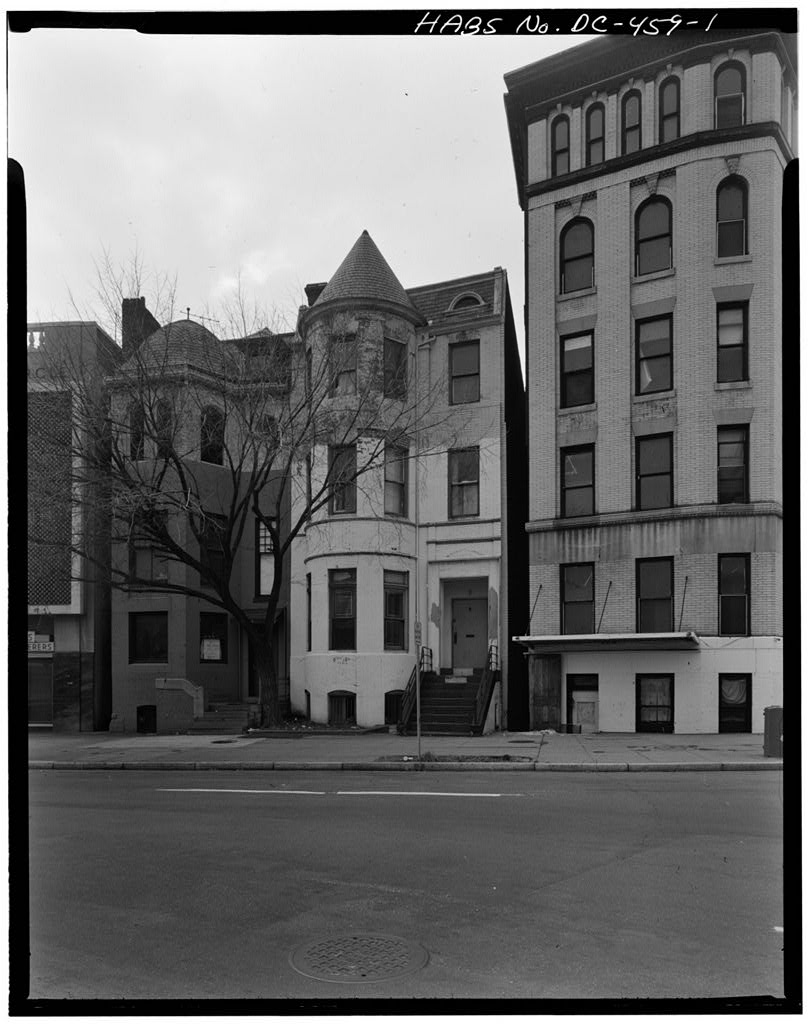
3 Thomas Circle NW, Washington, D.C., in 1954

Young returned to the United States in June 1967 and worked briefly for The Washington Post before resigning in the fall of that year to become a full-time anti-Vietnam War movement activist and staff member of the Liberation News Service. Young, Marshall Bloom, Ray Mungo and others worked in the office at 3 Thomas Circle producing the news packets that were sent to the hundreds of underground newspapers bi-weekly or tri-weekly. A member of the Students for a Democratic Society he was part of the Columbia University protests of 1968 and was among more than 700 arrested. When the Liberation News Service split in two in August 1968 Young became a recognized leader of the New York office.

=== Venceremos Brigade ===
In February and March 1969 Young went to Cuba, where he was instrumental in the organization of the Venceremos Brigade. Young became disillusioned with the Castro regime after observing the lack of civil liberties and other freedoms, and especially the government's anti-gay policies. After the Mariel Boatlift he wrote Gays Under the Cuban Revolution, breaking with those New Leftists who continued to defend the Cuban Revolution.

=== Gay Liberation movement ===
After the Stonewall riots in New York City, Young became involved in the Gay Liberation Front. During the second half of 1970 he lived in the Seventeenth Street collective with Carl Miller, Jim Fouratt, and Giles Kotcher where he was involved in producing Gay flames. Young wrote frequently for the gay press, including The Advocate, Come Out!, Fag Rag, and Gay Community News among others. His 1972 interview with Allen Ginsberg, which first appeared in Gay Sunshine is often reprinted and translated.

Young has edited four books with Karla Jay including the ground breaking anthology Out of the Closets.

=== Continuing activism ===
Young moved to rural Massachusetts in 1973 to an 'intentional community'. Carrying a sign which read Royalston, Mass. population 973 he attended the National March on Washington for Lesbian and Gay Rights. He was a reporter and assistant editor for the Athol Daily News from 1979 to 1989, and Director of Community Relations for the Athol, Massachusetts Memorial Hospital, 1989 to 1999. He joined the Montague Nuclear Power Plant protests shortly after Sam Lovejoy's toppling of the weather tower in 1974. He has served on the board of directors of the Mount Grace Land Conservation Trust, and in 2004 received the Writing and Society Award from the University of Massachusetts Amherst English Department "honoring a distinguished career of commitment to the work of writing in the world." Since 2009, he has been writing a weekly column, entitled Inside/Outside, for the Athol Daily News.

== Works and publications ==
- Gay Sunshine interview with Allen Ginsberg. Grey Fox Press. 1974. ISBN 978-0-912516-05-9.
- The Gay Report: Lesbians and Gay Men Speak Out About Sexual Experiences and Lifestyles. Summit Books. 1979. ISBN 978-0-671-40013-2.
- Gays under the Cuban revolution. Grey Fox Press. 1982. ISBN 978-0-912516-61-5.
- North of Quabbin: a guide to nine Massachusetts towns. Millers River. 1983. ISBN 978-0-912395-00-5.
- North of Quabbin revisited: a guide to nine Massachusetts towns north of Quabbin Reservoir. Haley's. 2003. ISBN 978-1-884540-64-6.
- Make hay while the sun shines: farms, forests and people of the North Quabbin. iUniverse. 2007. ISBN 978-0-595-45353-5.
- Thalassa: one week in a Provincetown dune shack. Haley's. 2011. ISBN 978-1-884540-23-3.
- The man who got lost: North Quabbin stories. Haley's. 2012. ISBN 978-1-884540-98-1.
- Left, gay and green: a writer's life. CreateSpace. 2018. ISBN 978-1-977816955.

=== Edited anthologies ===
- Out of the closets: Voices of gay liberation. Douglas Books. 1972. ISBN 978-0-88209-002-3. With Karla Jay.
- After you're out: Personal experiences of gay men and lesbian women. Links. 1975. ISBN 978-0-8256-3056-9. With Karla Jay.
- Lavender culture. Jove. 1979. ISBN 978-0-515-04462-1. With Karla Jay.
- More than sand and sea: Images of Cape Cod. Brandstead Press. 1982. ISBN 978-0-912395-07-4.
- The Millers River reader. Millers River. 1987. ISBN 978-0-912395-10-4.
