= James Petras =

American sociologist (1937–2026)

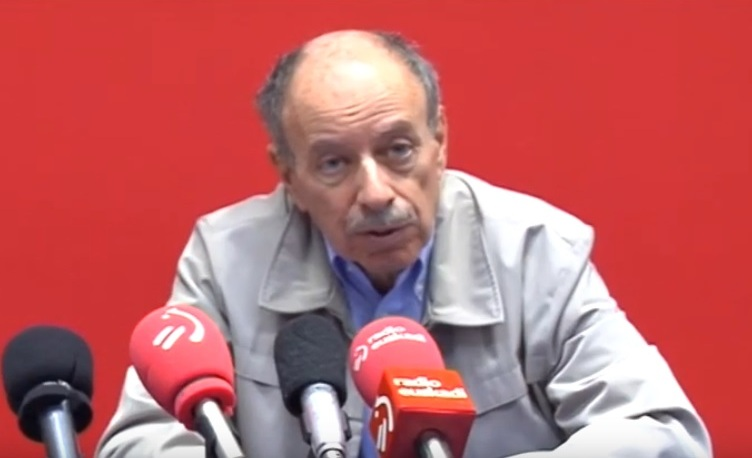
- Petras in 2013
- Born: 17 January 1937; Lynn, Massachusetts, U.S.
- Died: 17 January 2026 (aged 89); Seattle, Washington, U.S.
- Occupation: Professor of sociology

James Petras (17 January 1937 – 17 January 2026) was an American sociologist and academic who was the Bartle Professor (Emeritus) of Sociology at Binghamton University in Binghamton, New York, and adjunct professor at Saint Mary's University, Halifax, Nova Scotia, Canada. He published on political issues with particular focus on Latin America and the Middle East, imperialism, globalization, and leftist social movements.

== Life and work ==
=== Academic and literature ===
Petras was a Greek-American sociologist who received a B.A. from Boston University and Ph.D. from the University of California at Berkeley. He joined the Sociology Department at Binghamton in 1972 as a specialist in the following fields: Development, Latin America, the Caribbean, revolutionary movements, class analysis. During his career he received the Western Political Science Association's Best Dissertation award (1968), the Career of Distinguished Service Award from the American Sociological Association's Marxist Sociology Section, and the Robert Kenny Award for Best Book of 2002.

He was the author of more than 60 books published in 29 languages, and over 600 articles in professional journals, including the American Sociological Review, British Journal of Sociology, Social Research and Journal of Peasant Studies. He has published over 2,000 articles in publications such as the New York Times, The Guardian, The Nation, Christian Science Monitor, Foreign Policy, New Left Review, Partisan Review, Canadian Dimension, and Le Monde Diplomatique. He wrote a monthly column for the Mexican newspaper, La Jornada, and has previously written for the Spanish daily, El Mundo. His commentary is widely carried on the internet and radio stations around the world.

Petras contributed to CounterPunch, the Atlantic Free Press, and The Unz Review. He is the author of Unmasking Globalization: Imperialism of the Twenty-First Century (2001, and co-author of The Dynamics of Social Change in Latin America (2000), System in Crisis (2003), Social Movements and State Power (2003), Empire With Imperialism (2005), and Multinationals on Trial (2006).

=== Political views ===
Petras was a member of the Young Socialist Alliance circa 1960, and is listed as the Bay Area correspondent for The Young Socialist in several issues. Through the decades Petras has worked directly with indigenous workers as an organizer, in particular with the Brazilian Landless Workers' Movement and the unemployed workers' movement in Argentina.

He advised left-wing presidents such as Prime Minister Andreas Papandreou of Greece (1981–84), President Salvador Allende of Chile (1970–73) and in later years, President Hugo Chávez of Venezuela. He has established himself as a defender of the rights of the indigenous in Latin America. From 1973 to 1976 Petras worked on the Bertrand Russell Tribunal on Repression in Latin America.

Petras referred to American policy towards Iraq as "The US/Iraqi Holocaust (UIH)" which he described as "an ongoing process spanning the last 16 years (1990-2006) [that] provides us with a striking example of state-planned systematic extermination, torture and physical destruction designed to de-modernize a secular developing society and revert [sic] it into a series of warring clan-tribal-clerical-ethnic based entities devoid of any national authority or viable economy."

In November 2006, he was one of the recipients of a letter from FARC in Colombia concerning three American hostages (Keith Stansell, Marc Gonsalves and Thomas Howes). Other recipients included the Reverend Jesse Jackson, Noam Chomsky, Angela Davis, and several American film stars.

He described the political conflict during and following the 2009 presidential election in Iran as pitting "high income, free market oriented capitalist" reformists against Ahmadinejad's "working class, low income, community-based supporters of a 'moral economy'", and denounced the claim that the election was stolen as a "hoax" perpetrated by "Western opinion makers".

Petras defended Marine Le Pen during the 2017 French presidential campaign, praising her policy views as pro-working class, anti-imperialist, Keynesian, pro-choice, and supportive of gay rights. Petras predicted that a victory by Emmanuel Macron followed by his implementation of an "ultra-neoliberal supply-side agenda" would lead to mass street demonstrations by leftists, followed by a stronger Le Pen candidacy in the 2022 election.

=== Anti-Zionism, criticisms of the Jewish lobby and allegations of antisemitism ===
In his book The Power of Israel in the United States, published in 2006 by Clarity Press, Petras described the power of the Israel lobby over American foreign policy. In a debate about the book with Norman Finkelstein, a former student of James Petras at SUNY Binghamton, during which Finkelstein described the book as having a conspiratorial "cloak and dagger" approach to geopolitics as opposed to a Marxist analysis, Petras accused Finkelstein of downplaying Jewish power: "I am afraid that when it comes to dealing with the predominantly Jewish lobby, he has a certain blind spot, which is understandable. In many other national and ethnic groups -- where they can criticize the world but [not] when it comes to identifying the power and malfeasance of their own group."

In his 2008 book, If I Am Not For Myself: Journal of an Anti-Zionist Jew, leftist writer Mike Marqusee criticised Petras for purportedly "overt antisemitism": "Petras... seems unaware of the way postulates about the secret power of a pro-Israel Jewish network echo older [antisemitic] themes." Marqusee particularly criticised his dismissal of Finkelstein's and Chomsky's criticisms of his position, which Petras attributes to an ethnically-grounded blindness to the negative role of American Jews. Instead, Marqusee described the argument advanced by Petras as "a circular, inherently racist argument." Marqusee concluded that Petras is not an internationalist, but an America first nationalist. The leftist writer Michael Bérubé similarly criticised the book, describing it as reading like "a fringe far-right figure such as David Duke" Allen Ruff, a Trotkyist historian, reviewed the book in Against The Current and noted that "There’s a strong undercurrent here of an appeal to a far-from-savory American nationalism which seems very strange coming from a veteran revolutionary anti-imperialist", and that Petras blurs distinctions between terms such as Jewish lobby, Israel lobby and Zionist lobby and "lapses into the well-worn dual-loyalty discourse" about Jews, in a manner reminiscent of "elements of the far right".

In a 2008 interview, Petras stated that "it’s one of the great tragedies that we have a minority that represents less than 2% of North American’s population but has such power in the communications media" and that the reason "why the North American public doesn’t react against the manipulations of this minority...[is] because the Jews control the communications media."

In 2011 and again in 2017, Petras endorsed works by Gilad Atzmon which have been described as antisemitic.

In 2011, Mark Gardner of the Community Security Trust, which monitors antisemitism in the UK, wrote an article in the left-wing magazine Dissent saying that Petras' works "present a conspiracy theory that... fits resoundingly with the late-nineteenth and early-twentieth-century socialist linkage of Jews with capitalism, now updated and repackaged for twenty-first-century anti-capitalist discourse." In 2014, Marxist scholar Werner Bonefeld described Petras as exemplary of a current of antisemitism on the anti-imperialist left: "The Jews [in Petras' work] have not only conquered Palestine; they have also taken control of America, or as James Petras sees it, the current effort of 'U.S. empire building' is shaped by 'Zionist empire builders.'" Similarly, author Paul Bogdanor described Petras as "articulat[ing] his theory of the organized American Jewish community as a 'Zionist Power Configuration' (ZPC)—an acronym that he apparently developed as a substitute for the neo-Nazi term 'Zionist Occupation Government' (ZOG)... and cautions against 'the role of the Zionist/Jewish Lobby in promoting future US wars.' None of this material is readily distinguishable from contemporary neo-Nazi propaganda."

=== Death ===
Petras died in Seattle on 17 January 2026, his 89th birthday.

== Selected bibliography ==
- Latin America in the Vortex of Social Change: Development and Resistance Dynamics, with Henry Veltmeyer, Routledge (2019).
- Power and Resistance: US Imperialism in Latin America, with Henry Veltmeyer, (2015).
- The politics of empire. The US, Israel and the Middle East, (2014).
- The New Extractivism. A Post-Neoliberal Development Model or Imperialism of the Twenty-First Century?, with Henry Veltmeyer, Zed Books (2014).
- Imperialism and Capitalism in the Twenty-First Century: A System in Crisis, with Henry Veltmeyer, Ashgate (2013).
- Beyond Neoliberalism: A World to Win, with Henry Veltmeyer, Ashgate (2012).
- The Arab Revolt and the Imperialist Counterattack, Clarity Press, Inc. (2012). ISBN 1-4611-1760-7 ISBN 978-1-4611-1760-5
- Social Movements in Latin America: Neoliberalism and Popular Resistance, with Henry Veltmeyer, Palgrave Macmillan (2011).
- War Crimes in Gaza and the Zionist Fifth Column in America, Clarity Press, Inc. (2010). ISBN 0-9845255-0-5 ISBN 978-0-9845255-0-8
- What's Left in Latin America?, with Henry Veltmeyer, (2009).
- Global Depression And Regional Wars, Clarity Press, Inc. (2008).
- System in crisis: the dynamics of free market capitalism, with Henry Veltmeyer, Fernwood, Zed Books (2008).
- Zionism, Militarism and the Decline of US Power, Clarity Press, Inc. (2008). ISBN 0-932863-60-4
- Multinationals on trial: foreign investment matters, with Henry Veltmeyer, Ashgate (2007).
- Rulers and Ruled in the US Empire: Bankers, Zionists and Militants, Clarity Press, Inc. (2007). ISBN 978-0-932863-54-6
- The Power of Israel in the United States, Clarity Press, Inc. (2006). ISBN 0-932863-51-5
- Empire with Imperialism: The Globalizing Dynamics of Neoliberal Capitalism, Luciano Vasapollo, Zed Books (2006).
- Social Movements and State Power: Argentina, Brazil, Bolivia, Ecuador, with Henry Veltmeyer, Pluto Press (2005).
- The New Development Politics: The Age of Empire Building and New Social Movements, Ashgate (2003).
- Globalization Unmasked: Imperialism in the 21st Century, with Henry Veltmeyer, Zed Books (2001).
- The Dynamics of Social Change in Latin America, with Henry Veltmeyer, Palgrave Macmillan (2000).
- The Left Strikes Back: Class And Conflict In The Age Of Neoliberalism (2000).
- Empire or Republic: Global Power or Domestic Decay in the US, with Morris Morley, Routledge (1994).
- Latin America in the Time of Cholera: Electoral Politics, Market Economics, and Permanent Crisis, Routledge (1992).
- The United States and Chile: imperialism and the overthrow of the Allende government, with Morris H. Morley, Monthly Review Press (1975).
