= New York Ace =

Underground newspaper

- Type: Biweekly newspaper
- Format: Tabloid
- Publisher: Rex Weiner
- Editor-in-chief: Bob Singer
- Founded: December 22, 1971; 54 years ago in New York City
- Ceased publication: 1972; 54 years ago
- Headquarters: New York, NY

New York Ace was an underground newspaper founded in New York City in late 1971 by ex-East Village Other staffers to fill the void created by the demise of the EVO. Ace was published by 21-year-old Rex Weiner and edited by 18-year-old Bob Singer. Published biweekly in tabloid format, the Ace had a print run of 6,000 copies and never succeeded in attracting advertisers.

Staffers included P.J. O'Rourke, Tom Forcade, A.J. Weberman, Jay Kinney, Yossarian, D.A. Latimer, R. Meltzer, Coca Crystal, and Jim Buckley. Steve Heller, art director of Screw magazine, moonlighted as art director of Ace.

== Publication history ==
The first issue of Ace, produced in Weiner's Thompson Street apartment on a shoestring budget of a few hundred dollars, was dated Dec. 22, 1971.

Despite the infusion of $5,000 by a financial angel at Columbia University, which financed the acquisition of a ratty basement office on 17th Street with four battered desks and a single IBM Executive typewriter, the paper soon fell into financial difficulties and could not pay its New Jersey printer, resulting in its suspension in the summer of 1972. The paper attempted to stagger on for a while but by 1973 Rex Weiner had given up, and with Deanne Stillman started a new enterprise, the New York News Service, an alternative news agency.

Jim Buckley characterized the New York Ace as "an amalgam of writers bent on one goal—to wipe out the Village Voice;" but in the end it was the Voice and its imitators that survived. Coming on the heels of the successive failures of the New York Avatar, the New York Free Press, Rat, and the EVO, the demise of Ace marked the effective end of the underground newspaper era in New York City.

== See also ==
- List of underground newspapers of the 1960s counterculture
