= Floyd Norris =

American financial journalist

Floyd Norris (born September 6, 1947 Los Angeles) is the former chief financial correspondent of The New York Times and International Herald Tribune. He wrote a regular column on the stock market for the Times, plus a blog. He now serves as a professor at Johns Hopkins University.

== Biography ==
Norris attended University of California, Irvine, then was a Walter Bagehot Fellow in Economics and Business Journalism at Columbia University, where he received an MBA in 1982. He joined the Times in 1988. He previously worked as a columnist and writer for Barron's. In 2014 he accepted the NY Times buyout package offer. His last day was December 19, 2014.

Norris worked for Barron's beginning in December 1982, as a staff writer and later stock market editor. Norris was recognized by the New York Society of Certified Public Accountants for "outstanding reporting on accounting issues" in 1984. Also, he was recognized by the Financial Writers Association of New York for "outstanding lifetime achievement" in 1998.

Norris began his career as a reporter for the College Press Service in 1969. From 1970 to 1972, he was a reporter and editor for The Manchester (N.H.) American. From 1972 to 1974, he was a political reporter for the Concord (N.H.) Monitor. From 1974 to 1977, he worked for UPI, then from 1977 to 1978, he was press secretary for Senator John A. Durkin. From 1978 to 1981, he was an editor and business writer for the AP.

He lives in Brooklyn with his wife, Christine Bockelmann.

== Awards ==
- 2003: Loeb Foundation's Lifetime Achievement Award
- 2001: Gerald Loeb Award, for Commentary
- 1998: Elliott V. Bell Award, by the New York Financial Writers Association

== Works ==
- Floyd Norris, Christine Bockelmann (eds), The New York Times Century of Business, McGraw-Hill, 2000, ISBN 978-0-07-135589-6
