= Deer Hunting with Jesus =

Book by Joe Bageant

Deer Hunting with Jesus: Dispatches from America's Class War
- Author: Joe Bageant
- Language: English
- Published: 2007
- Publication place: United States
- Pages: 273
- ISBN: 978-1-921215-78-0

Deer Hunting with Jesus: Dispatches from America's Class War is a book written by Joe Bageant published in 2007. It concerns his return to his hometown of Winchester, Virginia, and his take on income inequality and problems facing the working poor.
