= Metrocorp Publishing =

American media company

Metrocorp Publishing is an American media company based in Philadelphia that publishes lifestyle magazines in the United States. It is known for publishing Philadelphia magazine, along with Philadelphia Wedding magazine and Be Well Philly. It is owned by the Lipson family.

Metrocorp grew out of the company that has published Philadelphia magazine since 1946. It acquired Boston magazine in 1970, and published it for several decades until selling it to Boston Globe Media in 2025. From 2004 to 2007, Metrocorp also owned Boston's Weekly Dig.

In 2025, Citizen Media Group, a newly formed nonprofit, acquired Philadelphia magazine from Metrocorp.
