= Henry Veltmeyer =

Canadian sociologist and author

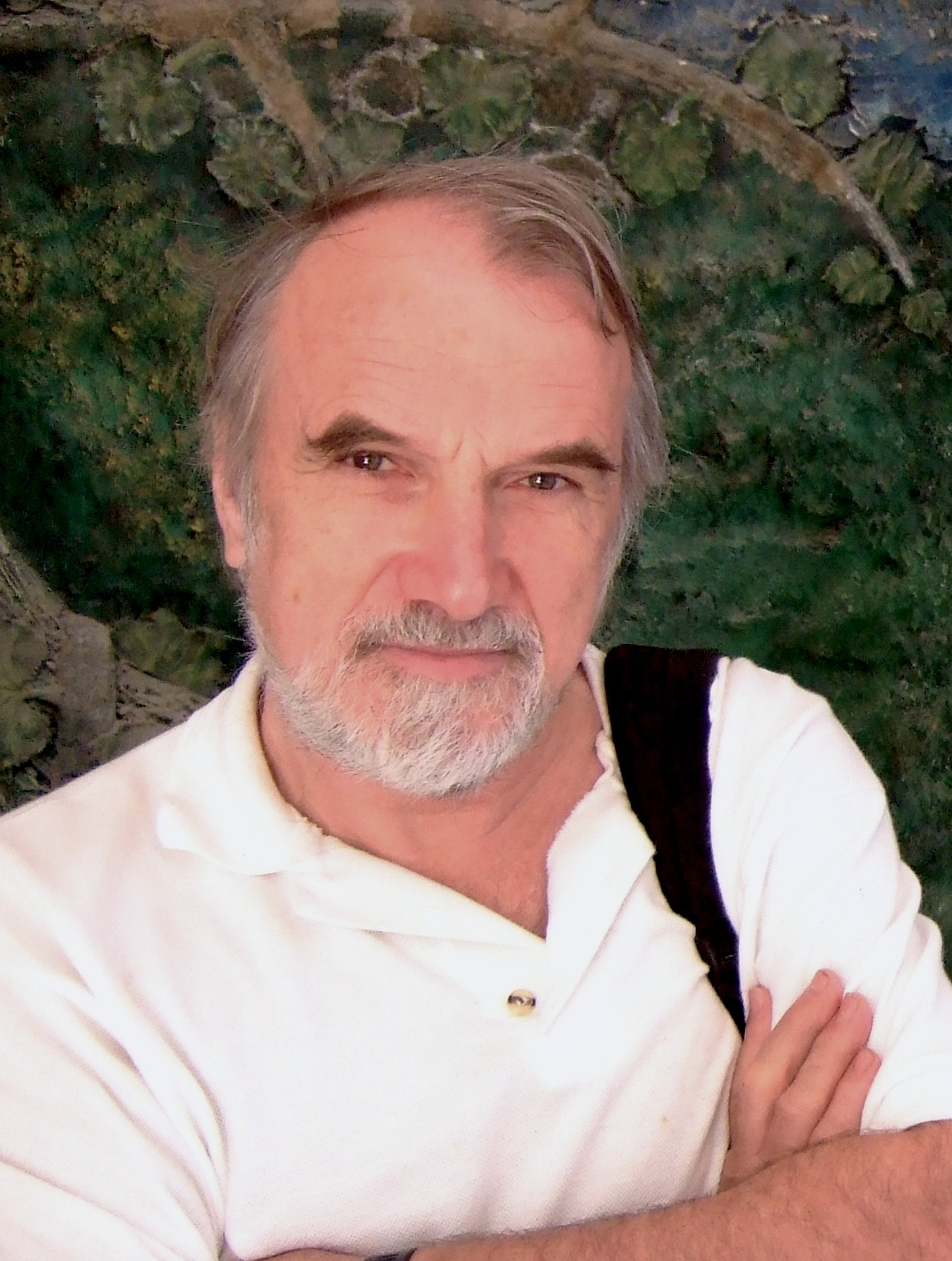
Dr. Henry Veltmeyer at the CITMA office in Santa Clara, Cuba

Henry Veltmeyer is a professor of Sociology and International Development Studies at Saint Mary's University (Halifax), Nova Scotia, Canada. He is a prolific author on matters of Development and Globalization. He is also on faculty at the Universidad Autónoma de Zacatecas, in the Unidad Académica en Estudios de Desarrollo.

== Life and work ==
Veltmeyer received his Licenciatura in linguistics (1970) at the Universidad de Guayaquíl, Ecuador, his M.A. in Education & Social Sciences (1970) and a second M.A. in Latin American studies (1971) at the University of Alabama, and his PhD in political science (1976) at McMaster University. He joined the faculty of sociology at Saint Mary's University (SMU) in 1976 and founded the programme in International Development Studies at SMU in 1985.

Veltmeyer's thematic focus in recent years has been on globalization and development. Other areas of research and writing include new social movements, political economy of development, the 2007–2008 world food price crisis, local development, and corporate power.

In 2004, Veltmeyer joined the faculty of the Unidad Académica en Estudios de Desarrollo at the Universidad Autónoma de Zacatecas as adjunct professor.

Veltmeyer was the driving force behind the creation of the Critical Development Studies Network (CDS) on 21 October 2006, with the issuance of the Halifax Communiqué.

In 2009, Veltmeyer assumed the presidency of the Canadian Association for the Study of International Development, after serving as vice-president for the previous year. His term expired with the CASID 2010 AGM.

== Selected bibliography ==
- "The Cuban Revolution as Socialist Human Development." Leiden: Brill Publishers. Coauthor Mark Rushton. (2011) ISBN 978-90-04-21043-1
- "Social Movements in an Era of Neoliberal Globalization: The People Strike Back." Palgrave Macmillan. Co-author James Petras. (2010) (in press)
- "Imperialism, Crisis and Class Struggle: The Verities of Capitalism." Leiden: Brill Publishers. (Editor). (2010)
- "Critical Development Studies: Tools for Change." Fernwood Books / London: Pluto Press (Editor). (2010)
- "What's Left in Latin America?" Ashgate Publishing. Coauthor James Petras. (2009) ISBN 978-0-7546-7797-0
- "Multinationals on Trial: Foreign Investment Matters." London: Ashgate Publishing. Coauthor James Petras. (2007) ISBN 978-0-7546-4949-6
- "Empire with Imperialism: The Globalizing Dynamics of Neoliberal Capitalism." Zed Books. Coauthors James Petras, Luciano Vasapollo and Mauro Casadio. (2006) ISBN 978-1-84277-669-8
- "From the Net to the Net: Atlantic Canada and the Global Economy." (Editor) Coeditor James Sacouman. (2005) ISBN 978-1-55193-051-0
- "A System in Crisis: The Dynamics of Free Market Capitalism." Zed Books. Coauthor James Petras. (2004) ISBN 978-1-84277-364-2
- "Transcending Neoliberalism: Community -Based Development in Latin America." Kumarian Press. (Editor) Coeditor Anthony M. O'Malley (2001). ISBN 978-1-56549-124-3
- "Globalization Unmasked: Imperialism in the 21st Century". Zed Books. Coauthor James Petras. (2001) ISBN 978-1-85649-939-2
- "The Labyrinth of Latin American Development." New Delhi, A. P. H. Publishing Corporation. (1999) ISBN 978-81-7648-139-7
