= Collegiate Press Service =

US news agency

- Formerly: College Press Service; College Press Exchange (1991–c. 1999)
- Company type: News agency
- Industry: Student publications
- Founded: 1962; 64 years ago
- Defunct: 1999; 27 years ago
- Headquarters: (1962–1971) Washington, D.C. (1971–c. 1991) Denver (c. 1991–c. 1999) Chicago, U.S.
- Area served: United States
- Key people: Bill Sonn, Floyd Norris (writer), Pete Wagner (cartoonist), Ed Stein (cartoonist)
- Products: News articles and graphics
- Owner: USSPA (1962–1971); Worker cooperative (1971–1978); Interrobang, Inc. (1978–1990); Tribune Media Services (1990–c. 1999)

Collegiate Press Service, also called College Press Service (CPS), was a news agency supplying stories to student newspapers. It operated under various owners and names from 1962 to c. 1999.

== History ==
=== United States Student Press Association ===
Collegiate Press Service began in 1962 as the news agency of the United States Student Press Association (USSPA), which at the time was receiving support and covert financing from right-wing organizations like Reader's Digest and the CIA. CPS was originally based in Washington, D.C.

As the decade moved along, CPS drifted more leftward, but in the summer of 1967, two radical staff members of CPS — Ray Mungo and Marshall Bloom — were purged from the USSPA; they immediately established the alternative news agency Liberation News Service (LNS).

=== Worker cooperative; move to Denver ===
When USSPA suffered financial setbacks in 1971 (eventually going defunct), CPS was spun off and became a progressive news collective in Denver, Colorado. (CPS continued to have a D.C. office until 1973, when the Dispatch News Service went defunct and CPS had to leave their shared office space.)

In April 1978, CPS dissolved, selling its name (and client list) to two enduring advocates, cartoonist Ed Stein and writer Bill Sonn, and distributing funds from the sale to progressive groups in Denver.

=== Interrobang ===
Stein and Sonn converted the operation to a commercial enterprise, adding High School News & Graphics to its college and university press service.

Stein remained as co-publisher of CPS for only a short time, as he was appointed as the staff editorial cartoonist of the Rocky Mountain News later in 1978. Sonn renamed the whole operation Interrobang, Inc., with himself as president and CEO.

In 1990, Interrobang (and CPS) was acquired by Tribune Media Services (TMS), with Sonn staying on as CEO.

=== Tribune Media Services; College Press Exchange ===
In May 1991, TMS renamed CPS to College Press Exchange, Interrobang was dissolved, and Sonn left the organization. At that point, it was supplying news and graphics to 600 college newspapers and 400 high schools with a staff of three and dozens of freelance writers and cartoonists.

In c. 1999, CPE was absorbed into the syndicate's existing service "tms Campus."
