= Freshly Squeezed (comic strip) =

American comic strip by Ed Stein

- Author: Ed Stein
- Website: EdSteinInk.com
- Current status/schedule: Conclude daily strip; reruns
- Launch date: September 20, 2010
- End date: October 19, 2014
- Syndicate(s): United Features Syndicate
- Genre: Humor
- Preceded by: Denver Square
- Followed by: Sleeper Ave

Freshly Squeezed was an American comic strip, written and illustrated by Ed Stein, also the cartoonist of Denver Square comic strip for the Rocky Mountain News. Freshly Squeezed began in 2010 — chronicling the life of an inter-generational family which has united after the economic collapse — and ended in October 2014.

== Publication history ==
The main inspiration for Stein to start Freshly Squeezed was the rising tide of multi-generational families. The comic was in a way a sequel to Denver Square (which ran from January 12, 1997, to May 21, 2008). Most of the characters were directly taken from that strip. However, Ed Stein has restyled them.

Freshly Squeezed was syndicated by United Features Syndicate. It started running on September 20, 2010, on the syndicate's website, Comics.com.

On Sunday, October 19, 2014, Freshly Squeezed ended. "Well, I've decided to quit drawing Freshly Squeezed; after 36 years of meeting daily deadlines it's time to do something on my own schedule." noted Stein. He has now begun working on a new project called Sleeper Ave, while Freshly Squeezed continues in re-runs on GoComics.com.

== Story and characters ==
After the 2008 economic collapse, the number of multi-generational families was on the rise, with over 49 million Americans living in such families (as of 2008). Freshly Squeezed is relevant to this topic and on the humor exchanged between these inter-generational family members.

Liz and Sam are the main couple of this cartoon. Nate, is their pre-teen son who loves the fact that his grandparents are moving into his house. Sarah is the grandmother of Nate and the mother of Liz. She is described as strong willed woman who is never ready to accept that her daughter can do things rightly. Grandpa Irv is a Korean War veteran, who loves watching TV programs and spoiling his own grandson Nate.
