= Earth (1970s magazine) =

American counterculture magazine

- December 1970 cover
- Editor: James A. Goode
- Frequency: Monthly
- Publisher: Earth Publishing Corporation
- Founder: Richard Brams and James A. Goode
- First issue: December 1970
- Final issue Number: April 1972 vol. 3, no. 1
- Based in: (editorial office) San Francisco, California, U.S. (business office) Chicago, Illinois, U.S.

Earth magazine was a counterculture magazine published in the 1970s. It later became Earth News, an alternative news agency for radio stations. Former staffers from Earth later formed a number of alternative news agencies of their own, all of which survived into the 1980s.

== Overview ==
Earth magazine reflected the vibrant cultural landscape of late 1960s/early 1970s, typical of the era's underground press. Featuring glossy covers and newsprint inside pages, with large photo spreads, the magazine covered a range of countercultural topics, including the environment, music, literature, the Vietnam War, comics, and fashion.

Notable features included events like the 1970 Isle of Wight Festival, showcasing performers such as Roger Daltrey, Joan Baez, Jimi Hendrix, Miles Davis, Donovan, and John Sebastian; alongside striking images of naked audience members. Other issues boasted similar high-quality spreads capturing the zeitgeist.

The New York Times writer Philip H. Dougherty described the first issue: "[It] contains only one ecology feature. It does, however, include photo essays on the brutality of Marine Corps drill instructors, the rock festival on the Isle of Wight, and Iggy Stooge, the rock singer." The January 1971 edition featured a five-fold color poster titled "Merry Christmas."

Earth made news in March 1972 by publishing a story claiming that in the summer of 1968 the U.S. Army had tested nerve gas in Cambodia.

== Publication history ==
Earth was co-founded in San Francisco by James A. Goode, former articles editor at Playboy (and the "inventor" of the Playboy interview). (Note: During his career (both before and after Earth), co-publisher and editor Goode headed several pornographic magazines, including Playgirl, Penthouse, Viva, Oui, Hustler, and Chic. He also headed The National Times magazine, FilmNews International, Platinum, and the Robb Report.) The magazine's editorial offices were located in the Agriculture Building, located at the intersection of Embarcadero and Mission.

The first issue of Earth magazine, dated December 1970, appeared on newsstands on November 17, 1970, with a price tag of 75 cents. 300,000 copies were printed.

The magazine's managing editor was Gerard Van der Leun.

Earth closed down in April 1972. With the magazine's closure, several former staffers started the alternative news agencies Earth News and Zodiac News Service.

== Earth News Service/NewScript Dispatch Service ==
Earth News service, headquartered at 210 California Street in San Francisco, was published by Tony Brown.

In 1974 it launched "Earth Starship," a five-day-a-week service offering subscriber radio stations coverage of contemporary music, film, and other entertainment facets. "Earth Starship" was edited by veteran music journalist Bill Sievert.

By 1977, Earth News' editor-in-chief was Nancy Stevens, and the agency provided two daily dispatches for broadcasters: "Earth News" and "Earth Starship."

In 1977, Brown sold Earth News to Stevens and KSAN (FM) news director David McQueen. Earth News was renamed NewScript Dispatch Service (to avoid confusion with a similarly named entity, Earth News Radio, hosted by Lew Erwin). After the change, the daily dispatches were renamed "NewsScript Dispatch" and "The Starship."

NewScript Dispatch Service survived into the early 1980s.

== Zodiac News Service/Her Say ==
Meanwhile, in 1972 Jonathan Newhall, another former Earth staffer, founded Zodiac News Service, headquartered on Howard Street. John S. Farley was the first general manager of Zodiac News Service.

In 1977, Zodiac staffers Marlene Edmunds and Anne Millner formed Her Say, a feminist alternative news service, along with Shelley Buck. (Zodiac distributed the Her Say dispatches.) By 1980, Her Say had over 100 radio subscribers, as well as print outlets like Ms. and Mother Jones.

Both Zodiac and Her Say lasted into the early 1980s.
