= Fenton Communications =

American public relations firm

- Founded: 1982; 44 years ago
- Founder: David Fenton; Robert Pollock
- Type: Privately held company
- Headquarters: New York City, New York
- Services: Public relations
- Key people: Valarie De La Garza (CEO)
- Website: fenton.com

Fenton Communications is an American public relations firm founded in 1982 by David Fenton. The firm provides communications services primarily to nonprofit organizations, foundations, advocacy organizations, and government entities, with work focused on areas including social justice, philanthropy, education, and sustainability. It is headquartered in New York City and has maintained offices in Washington, D.C., Los Angeles, and San Francisco. Its chief executive officer is Valarie De La Garza, who succeeded Ben Wyskida in 2021.

== History ==
The company was founded by David Fenton and Robert Pollock in 1982. In 1984, Fenton and Pollock split the company, with Fenton retaining the New York office and Pollock the Washington office. In 2014, the company was sold to Craig J. Leach and James Marcus, who were the principals of Collegium. As of 2014, the firm was headquartered in New York with offices in Los Angeles, San Francisco and Washington. According to Fenton, around 20% of the company's work was with for-profit concerns in areas such as corporate social responsibility and sustainability. Bill Werde, editorial director of Billboard, replaced Fenton as chief executive, while Fenton moved to the role of chairman. The CEO of Fenton is Valarie De La Garza. She succeeded Ben Wyskida as CEO in 2021.

Fenton specializes in public relations for not-for-profit organizations, and serves nonprofit, government, education and philanthropy clients dedicated to social justice and equity. Their client list includes foundations and advocacy organizations such as the W.K. Kellogg Foundation, Annie E. Casey Foundation, Color of Change, Science Moms, The Volcker Alliance, RAICES and PWC's CEO Action for Diversity and Inclusion. Vocus supplied the agency with web-based software to facilitate their public relations campaigns.

Clint Murchison described several of the company's campaigns as "less than honorable", including an Ancient Forest Campaign,' funded by the Rockefellers Environmental Grantmakers Association, as well as campaigns for the Sandinistas in Nicaragua, Andreas Papandreau of Greece, and the People's Republic of Angola.

Fenton has been described as an umbrella for several nonprofit organizations which it cofounded, including Environmental Media Services, which manages publicity for environmental groups; a social justice group called New Economy Communications, and an anti-death penalty lobby known as the Death Penalty Information Center.

The firm has represented numerous Marxist governments and organizations including the Sandinistas, Maurice Bishop's Marxist regime in Grenada, Angola, and others, as well as left-wing groups including MoveOn.org.

== Major campaigns and controversies ==
=== Alar ===
In 1989, FC, along with the Natural Resources Defense Council (NRDC), was involved in what came to be known as the Alar Scare. In this campaign, Fenton organized an attack on the use of Alar, a growth regulator which was used in the production of about 1/12th of apples in the U.S. The NRDC claimed that Alar was toxic to babies, and studies showed that very large dosages caused a small rate of cancer in research animals. Fenton's campaign was very successful, resulting in a huge decline in apple consumption. Farmers and industry groups claimed that the scare was unfounded or at least largely overstated. Reaction to the scare led to the proliferation of Food libel laws around the United States. David Fenton stated that FC's goal was to create so many repetitions of NRDC's message that average American consumers would hear it from many different media outlets in a short time. The story then would achieve a life of its own and continue to affect policy and consumer habits for some time, using extremely limited resources. While the company's work on Alar and other projects has been labeled propaganda, Fenton replied that "I would never say something that wasn’t true about it; that would undermine my ability to be successful. However, any reporter would write a lead paragraph that stresses the most dramatic aspects of the story."

In 1991 apple growers filed a highly publicized lawsuit against Fenton Communications and others for their role in the Alar Scare.

=== Breast implants ===
In the 1990s, the Chicago Tribune alleged that the company used Command Trust, an organization of women who had survived toxic breast implants to generate huge amounts of publicity in British tabloids and talk shows. This was refuted by Command Trust founder and breast implant survivor Sybil Niden Goldrich.
