= Moniebogue Press =

- Type: Alternative newspaper
- Format: Free weekly tabloid
- Founder(s): James L. Dudley, Van Howell, and Dean Speir
- Publisher: Van Howell
- Editor-in-chief: James L. Dudley
- Founded: July 1971; 54 years ago in Westhampton Beach
- Ceased publication: October 1972; 52 years ago
- Headquarters: Westhampton Beach, New York
- Circulation: 7,500–15,000

The Moniebogue Press was an alternative newspaper on Eastern Long Island, New York, United States, that lasted for thirty issues, from July 1971 to October 1972. Based in Westhampton Beach, its free distribution was 7500-15,000. Funded by local advertising, it served the communities of Riverhead, Center Moriches, East Quogue, Hampton Bays, and Southampton. Its co-founders and core staff were editor James L. Dudley (1940-2003), publisher/art director Van Howell (b. 1948) and ad-man/writer/agitator Dean Speir (1940-2023).

Like most of the dozens of offbeat little newspapers that sprang up in suburban and rural areas while the big-city underground press was expiring, the Moniebogue Press was addressed to the general public, (usually) avoided obscenity, and didn't promote drugs. It was a member of the Alternative Press Syndicate.

== Publication history ==
The Moniebogue Press was noted for its unpredictable editorial policies; for example, Dudley endorsed the Congressional run of Conservative Party of New York State candidate Robert David Lion Gardiner (1911-2004), the eccentric "16th lord of the manor" of Gardiner's Island; against incumbent Democrat Otis Pike when the Congressman threatened to turn the island into a park. The "token Marxist" columnist, Richie Marsalla, wrote of the Pope as a Godfather operating a gambling empire — referring to bingo in churches. Other articles exposed conditions in local trailer parks and migrant labor camps. The newspaper also led the successful charge to keep a consortium of real estate speculators and developers from constructing 237 garden apartment condominiums on wetlands on the edge of Moniebogue Bay. Interview subjects included Bo Diddley and an escapee from the Central Islip State Hospital.

In the second issue, an article about the proposed Shoreham Nuclear Power Plant by Lorna Salzman summed up most of the arguments that would be used over the following fifteen years in the successful campaign to forestall and ultimately thwart the plant's operation. The environment was a major theme, including Eric Salzman's in-depth coverage of "Mysteries of the Mycelium" and ongoing discussions of whether local snapping turtles (a/k/a "toropes") should be exterminated or celebrated.

The paper did not survive a lawsuit brought by a member of the East Quogue Taxpayers Association, who objected to being characterized as "the Wicked Witch of the East," and declined to accept an apology or negotiate an affordable settlement.

== Former staff's later activities ==
James L. Dudley moved on to a job at Forbes magazine, and later edited newsletters promoting obscure gold mining companies. Van Howell later founded the East End Independent (Karl Grossman, editor) and The Long Island Foghorn, while working as a labor organizer, freelance illustrator (for real newspapers), and self-employed philosopher. Dean Speir is still writing, having enjoyed a career as a movie reviewer and later a firearms journalist. C. L. Moss, whose bill-collecting prowess kept the paper mildly profitable, was convicted of murder in the 1970s.

== Archives ==
In 2006, microform copies of the Moniebogue Press were in the collections of sixty-one university libraries in North America, and at the National Library of Australia.
