= Ed Stein (cartoonist) =

American cartoonist (born 1946)

Edward Alan Stein (born November 22, 1946) is a liberal American cartoonist and former editorial cartoonist for the now-closed Rocky Mountain News in Denver, Colorado. Stein drew editorial cartoons five days a week, and previously published a local daily comic strip called Denver Square. Stein continues to draw editorial cartoons, which are syndicated by United Media, and have been printed in newspapers across the world in many languages. On September 20, 2010, Stein launched a syndicated national comic strip, entitled Freshly Squeezed.

== Education ==
Stein was born in a family of Jewish descent. He attended high school in Waco, Texas and college at the University of Denver, graduating with a B.F.A in 1969.

== Other work ==
Stein worked for many Colorado-based publications including Cervi's Journal and The Rocky Mountain Business Journal (since renamed Colorado Business Journal). For a short while, he was co-publisher of the College Press Service, before joining the Rocky Mountain News as staff editorial cartoonist in 1978, a position he held until the paper's 2009 closure.

He was the President of the Association of American Editorial Cartoonists (AAEC) in 1988.

In 2006, Stein co-hosted the 2006 AAEC Cartoonist's Convention, which was held in Denver.

== Awards and prizes ==
- Scripps Howard National Journalism Award for Editorial Cartooning, 1999.
- Special Category Award for Cartoons Relating to September 11 and Honorable Mention, Fischetti Editorial Cartoon Competition, 2002.
- John Fischetti Award for Editorial Cartooning, 2006.
- James Aronson Award for Social Justice Journalism and Cartooning with a Conscience 2008.

== Bibliography ==
- — (2002). Denver Square: We Need a Bigger House. Pelican Publishing Company. ISBN 978-1589801158. — a collection of cartoons about life in Denver from Stein's Denver Square comic strip
- — (1983). Stein's Way: Editorial Cartoons by Ed Stein. Denver Pub. Co. ISBN 978-0914807018.
