= Environmental Media Services =

Nonprofit organization

Environmental Media Services (EMS) is a Washington, D.C.–based nonprofit organization that is "dedicated to expanding media coverage of critical environmental and public health issues". EMS was founded in 1994 by Arlie Schardt, a former journalist, former communications director for Al Gore's 2000 Presidential campaign, and former head of the Environmental Defense Fund during the 1970s.

Their primary activities include holding forums that bring scientists knowledgeable in current environmental issues together with journalists, providing web hosting and support for environmental issues sites like RealClimate, and providing recommendations to journalists trying to locate experts knowledgeable on environmental topics. They also issue press releases related to environmental issues and provide an aggregation service that disseminates recent news on environmental topics.

EMS is closely allied with Fenton Communications (where they shared the same office space and personnel), "the largest public interest communications firm in the [United States]" which specializes in providing public relations for nonprofit organizations dealing with public policy issues.

As of December 31, 2005, Environmental Media Services ceased to function as an independent organization and merged with Science Communication Network.
