= Joe Bageant =

American author and columnist

- Born: October 5, 1946; Lewisburg, West Virginia, U.S.
- Died: March 26, 2011 (aged 64); Chiapas, Mexico
- Education: Bluefield College (attended, did not graduate)
- Occupations: Writer, journalist, social commentator
- Notable work: Deer Hunting with Jesus; Rainbow Pie: A Redneck Memoir
- Spouses: Barbara Bageant (divorced); Mary Bageant
- Children: 3

Joe Bageant (1946–2011) (pronounced "bay-gent") was an American author and columnist. He was best known for his 2007 book Deer Hunting With Jesus: Dispatches From America's Class War.

== Early life ==
As a child, Bageant lived in the insular, hardscrabble farming community of Unger, West Virginia and, later, just over the state line in the town of Winchester, Virginia. He attended John Handley High School there, but his teachers told him that he was not cut out for college, and his parents pressured him to work from an early age. Bageant quit school, joined the navy, and got married. He was discharged in the 1960s.

Bageant bought an old school bus and headed for San Francisco. En route, the bus broke down in Boulder, Colorado. He and his young family lived there for several years, sometimes on the bus, before moving to an Indian reservation in Idaho. During that time, Bageant worked at blue collar jobs until, in the mid-1970s, he broke his back and had to lie flat for months while he recovered. It was then that he started honing his writing skills, using his convalescence to perfect a prose style that would, over the years, acquire a cult following.

In 2001, Bageant moved back to Winchester.

== Progressive author ==
In Deer Hunting With Jesus, Bageant discusses how the Democratic Party lost the political support of poor rural whites and how the Republican Party has convinced them to "vote against their own economic self-interest". The book is mainly centered on his hometown of Winchester.

In 2010, Bageant published a similarly themed book, Rainbow Pie: A Redneck Memoir. He used his extended family's experience after World War II to describe the social hierarchy in the United States. The book examines the postwar journey of 22 million rural Americans into the cities, where they became, the author argues, the foundation of a permanent white underclass, and comprise much of today's heartland red state voters.

Bageant frequently appeared as a commentator on radio and television internationally and wrote a progressive online column which was distributed to hundreds of blogs and websites. He maintained his own blog joebageant.net, assisted by Ken Smith, who continued editing the blog after Bageant's death. Bageant also served as a senior (roving) editor for Cyrano's Journal Today and The Greanville Post, two sites devoted to progressive political and media analyses.

== Later life ==
During the last years of his life, Bageant lived in Ajijic, a small town on Lake Chapala in central Mexico. While living there, he wrote Rainbow Pie. On January 4, 2011, Bageant announced on his web site that he had been "struck down by an extremely serious form of cancer" that was inoperable. As a consequence, he was unable to engage in correspondence or his usual work, but he hoped to be able to resume them in the future.

On March 27, 2011, it was announced on his website that Bageant had died on March 26, following "a vibrant life" and a four-month struggle with cancer.

== Legacy ==
After Bageant's death, his Australian publisher asked Bageant's literary executor, Ken Smith, to select and edit about 80,000 words of his essays. The book was published in November 2011 as Waltzing at the Doomsday Ball: The Best of Joe Bageant. That posthumous collection was available only in Australia, New Zealand, and South Africa where, according to Smith, it sold reasonably well. According to Smith, "no American publisher is yet interested in a book by a redneck socialist—and that says a lot about American culture and the US book business."

Bageant's friends at The Greanville Post voted him as editor emeritus of the publication.

== Works ==
- Bageant, Joe (2007). Deer Hunting With Jesus. Portobello Books. ISBN 978-1-84627-152-6.
- Bageant, Joe (2010). Rainbow Pie: A Redneck Memoir. Portobello Books. ISBN 978-1-84627-257-8.
- Bageant, Joe (2012). Smith, Ken (ed.). Waltzing at the Doomsday Ball: The Best of Joe Bageant. Melbourne: Scribe Publications. ISBN 978-1921844515.
