= Marshall Bloom =

American journalist

- Born: July 16, 1944; Denver, Colorado, U.S.
- Died: November 1, 1969 (aged 25); Montague, Massachusetts
- Cause of death: Suicide by carbon monoxide poisoning
- Education: London School of Economics
- Alma mater: Amherst College, 1966
- Occupations: Journalist, activist
- Known for: Liberation News Service
- Awards: Samuel Bowles Prize

Marshall Irving Bloom (July 16, 1944 – November 1, 1969) was an American journalist and activist, best known as co-founder in 1967 of the Liberation News Service, the "Associated Press" of the underground press.

== Early life and education ==
Marshall Bloom was born in Denver, Colorado. He attended Amherst College and graduated in 1966. While there, he served as chairman of The Student publication and received the Samuel Bowles Prize for his accomplishments in journalism. During the summer of 1965, Bloom worked as a Montgomery, Alabama, correspondent for The Southern Courier, reporting on the Civil rights movement.

Bloom was one of the 20 Amherst graduates who walked out during their own commencement to protest the awarding of an honorary degree to Defense Secretary Robert McNamara.

Bloom achieved some national notoriety in England, where he attended the London School of Economics as a graduate student and was elected as president of its student union. He had a prominent role in the sit-ins and demonstrations there in the spring of 1967, protesting the appointment of Sir Walter Adams as the school's next director. Bloom was suspended and his suspension sparked further demonstrations.

== Liberation News Service ==
In the summer of 1967, Bloom was elected director of the United States Student Press Association (USSPA), which ran the Collegiate Press Service (CPS) news service. At an organizational meeting in Minneapolis in August, however, Bloom was purged from the USSPA because of his radical politics, which included a push to send student editors to Cuba and defy the U.S. travel ban. (Others thought that Bloom's purging was additionally because of what historian John McMillian refers to as his "effeminate demeanor"). As a result, Bloom and his colleague Ray Mungo formed the Liberation News Service.

The inaugural issue of the Liberation News Service, a mimeographed news packet, was sent in the summer of 1967. By February 1968, LNS was becoming the hub for alternative journalism in the United States, supplying the growing movement media with interpretive coverage of current events and reports on movement activities and the Sixties counterculture.

In 1968, the LNS moved to New York, and in August, an internal split developed. In August 1968, a successful fundraising event led to an ugly fight over control of the organization's funds. Bloom's intention was to abandon political activism in an urban setting, and supplant it with a Thoreauvian lifestyle. Aspiring to contribute to the counterculture phenomenon of rural communes in the late '60s, Bloom, Mungo, and their LNS colleague Steve Diamond left New York for Massachusetts, where they used the $6,000 cash from the fundraiser to make the down payment on a farm in Montague which was to be the new headquarters of LNS.

An angry posse of LNSers trailed them from New York, leading to a tense six-hour standoff at the farm. The dispute ended with Bloom writing a check for the money to the New York group, but soon afterward Bloom filed kidnapping charges against 13 people. The charges were later dismissed.

For the next six months, Bloom published the "LNS of the New Age," with subscribers receiving rival news packets from LNS-Montague and LNS-New York. But Bloom's group was understaffed, underfunded, and isolated on a remote (and cold) country farm, and the project died when the ink froze in the mimeograph. Only the New York headquarters group survived the split.

Bloom's former political colleagues, Ray Mungo and Verandah Porche, were later among the founders of a similar rural commune in southern Vermont.

== Death ==
On November 1, 1969, Bloom committed suicide by carbon monoxide poisoning. He was found dead in his car with the tailpipe connected to the window. Many theories have emerged as to why he killed himself; Allen Young and Amy Stevens have both suggested that it was because he was unhappily closeted.
