= Liberation News Service =

New Left underground press publication service

- Company type: News agency
- Industry: Underground press
- Predecessor: Collegiate Press Service
- Founded: August 1967; 59 years ago in Washington, D.C.
- Founders: Ray Mungo and Marshall Bloom
- Defunct: August 1981; 44 years ago
- Fate: Defunct
- Headquarters: New York City (1968–1981)
- Area served: United States
- Key people: Allen Young, Marty Jezer David Fenton, Thorne Webb Dreyer, Steve Diamond
- Products: News bulletins, photographs
- Number of employees: 8–20

Liberation News Service (LNS) was a New Left, anti-war underground press news agency that distributed news bulletins and photographs to hundreds of subscribing underground, alternative and radical newspapers from 1967 to 1981. Considered the "Associated Press" for the underground press, at its zenith the LNS served more than 500 papers. Founded in Washington, D.C., it operated out of New York City for most of its existence.

== Overview ==
Liberation News Service distributed news to a wide range of audiences, including African Americans, factory workers, women, ethnic minorities, and high school students; and institutions like bookstores, libraries, community centers, and prisons. One of LNS' mandates was documenting contemporary social movements, including worker strikes in Ohio, miners' rights movements, and the Attica Prison riot. LNS went beyond domestic news, covering international events in Africa, the Dominican Republic, and Latin America. It offered extensive reporting on the Vietnam War, including the lives of people in both North and South Vietnam. LNS provides scoops on important stories, covering topics like torture in Vietnam and political corruption in San Diego before other major news outlets.

According to former LNS staffers Thorne Dreyer and Victoria Smith, the Liberation News Service "was an attempt at a new kind of journalism — developing a more personalistic style of reporting, questioning bourgeois conceptions of 'objectivity' and reevaluating established notions about the nature of news..." They pointed out that LNS "provided coverage of events to which most papers would have otherwise had no access, and... put these events into a context, helping new papers in their attempts to develop a political analysis... In many places, where few radicals exist and journalistic experience is lacking, papers have been made possible primarily because LNS copy has been available to supplement scarce local material."

The total combined circulation of the LNS-member papers was estimated to be in the millions.

== History ==
=== Foundation ===
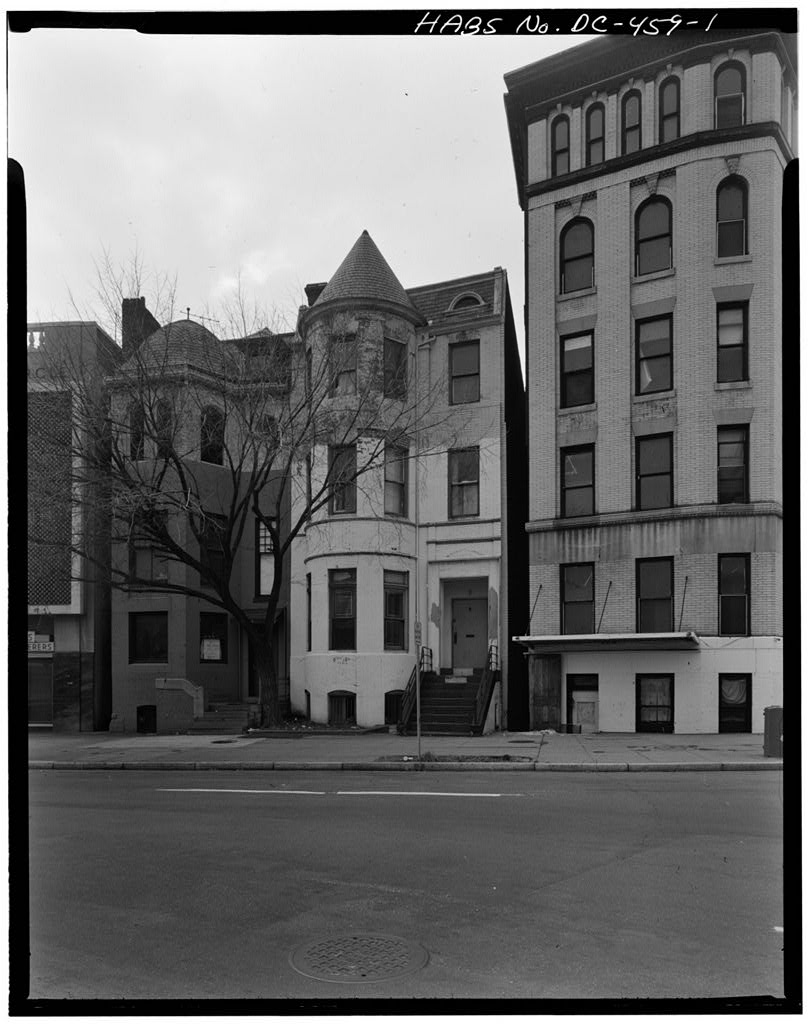
3 Thomas Circle NW, Washington, D.C., in 1954

Liberation News Service was founded in August 1967 by Ray Mungo and Marshall Bloom after they were separated from the United States Student Press Association and its Collegiate Press Service. Operating out of a townhouse at 3 Thomas Circle which they shared with the Washington Free Press, the LNS soon released its inaugural mimeographed news packet.

With support from private donors and assistance from the nearby Institute for Policy Studies, they were soon joined by other young journalists, including Allen Young, Marty Jezer, and photographer David Fenton, sending out packets of articles and photographs on a twice-weekly schedule to underground newspapers across the U.S. and abroad.

=== Expansion ===
During this time the writings of Thorne Webb Dreyer — co-founder of the Austin, Texas, underground paper The Rag — were widely distributed, appearing regularly in dozens of periodicals. Dreyer's coverage of the October 21, 1967, March on the Pentagon – with its massive acts of civil disobedience – was distributed by LNS and published around the world. The night before the march, Bloom, Mungo, and the other staffers convened a chaotic meeting in a Washington loft with underground press editors from around the country who were in town to cover the event; but they failed to reach an agreement to create a democratic structure in which LNS would be owned and run by its member papers.

Operating on their own with a volunteer staff of 12, Bloom and Mungo moved forward with ambitious plans for the expansion of LNS. In December 1967 they opened an international Telex line to Oxford, England; and later that winter LNS merged with the Student Communications Network (SCN), based in Berkeley, California, which had its own nationwide Telex network with terminals in Berkeley, Los Angeles, New York, Ann Arbor, Ames, Iowa, Chicago, and Philadelphia, leased from Western Union. The Student Communications Network was a project of the University Christian Movement, a liberal Protestant church organization described as "mostly concerned with political and social issues rather than Christian evangelization."

=== Opening of the New York office ===
By February 1968, LNS was becoming the hub for alternative journalism in the United States, supplying the growing movement media with interpretive coverage of current events and reports on movement activities and the Sixties counterculture. There were 150 underground papers and 90 college papers subscribing to LNS, with most subscribers paying (or at least being billed) $180 a year.

LNS took over the former SCN office in New York, which had just been opened by former Columbia University graduate student George Cavalletto and others in a converted Chinese restaurant on Claremont Avenue in Morningside Heights. Walking by, Steve Diamond saw a brand new Telex machine sitting in an otherwise empty storefront and a sign seeking volunteers, and attended a meeting shortly afterward at which the New York staff was formed.

Around this time, Rag co-founder Thorne Dreyer left Austin to help build LNS' editorial collective in New York City.

Two months after it opened, the New York office became a central focus for LNS activity during the Columbia University student uprising in April 1968, as a continual stream of bulletins going out over the Telex kept underground papers and radio stations across the country up-to-the-minute on the latest developments in the Columbia student strike. To young radicals across the country, it seemed as if the revolution had come.

=== Moving the headquarters to New York ===
Recognizing that New York was where the action was and running short on funds, Bloom and Mungo decided to relocate the national headquarters from the expensive townhouse office in D.C. to the large storefront space in New York, which Cavalletto was renting for only $200 a month. Bringing Allen Young, Harvey Wasserman, Verandah Porche, and some of the other Washington staff with them, along with Sheila Ryan of the Washington Free Press, they moved into the New York office.

A culture clash soon developed, however, between the headquarters staff and the already existing local staff in New York, which had been originally recruited by the Student Communications Network, and who had been running their own affairs up to that point. Over the summer the staff divided into warring cliques polarized between Bloom and Mungo, who controlled the board of directors, and Cavalletto, who held the lease on the office and was paying the rent. The Bloom/Mungo group was repeatedly outvoted in staff votes by the locals, who outnumbered them; only Steve Diamond of the New York group sided with the outsiders.

=== Montague farm fight ===
In August 1968, the fight over control of the organization came to a head. In the wake of a successful fundraising event, Bloom, Mungo, and Diamond surreptitiously took the $6,000 cash that had been raised, and used it to make the down payment on a farm in Montague, Massachusetts which was to be the new headquarters of LNS.

An angry posse followed them from the New York office to the farm to recover the funds and a tense six-hour standoff ended with Bloom writing a check to Cavalletto, but after the New York group left, Bloom filed kidnapping charges against 13 people, including Cavalletto, Ryan, Dreyer, and Victoria Smith. The charges were later dismissed.

For the next six months LNS subscribers received rival news packets from LNS-Montague and LNS-New York, but the Montague group was understaffed, underfunded, and isolated on a remote (and cold) country farm. Only the New York headquarters group survived the split, with Young becoming a recognized leader.

Bloom committed suicide the following year. A pro-Montague account of the split appears in Mungo's book Famous Long Ago: My Life and Hard Times with the Liberation News Service.

=== Reformation as a collective ===
The New York staff continued publication from the Claremont Avenue basement storefront, with the organization run as a collective.

The subscriber base grew to over 500 papers, and a high school underground press service, run by local high school students, was added. Allen Young estimates that something like 200 staffers worked at LNS over the years, "usually with 8-20 full-time participants or staff at any one time."

In 1969 LNS published a long essay co-authored by Thorne Dreyer and Victoria Smith, titled "The Movement and the New Media," which was considered to be the first serious journalistic portrait of the increasingly powerful underground press phenomenon. Dreyer also wrote extensively about the growing repression of underground papers throughout the country.

=== Dock of the Bay ===
The Liberation News Service member Dock of the Bay was a radical New Left underground newspaper, published weekly in San Francisco starting July 29, 1969. It was an Underground Press Syndicate. At least 17 issues were printed on a weekly basis from June 29, 1969, to November 25, 1969, when further publication was curtailed. Founded by young radicals and SDS members associated with the New Left activist paper Movement, staffers included Steve Diamond of the Liberation News Service.

Controversy with other participants in the underground press movement in the Bay Area developed when some of the Dock of the Bay staff were involved in a side project to launch a separate paper to be called the San Francisco Sex Review with the idea that profits from sex ads could be used to subsidize Dock of the Bay and other New Left projects in San Francisco. This project was aborted after a clash with feminists, and Dock of the Bay ceased publication shortly afterward.

=== Funding crisis ===
Much of LNS' funding came from liberal Protestant church organizations such as the aforementioned University Christian Movement. In 1970, however, the United States Senate Subcommittee on Internal Security subpoenaed LNS's financial records and leaked details about their church funding to a right-wing Midwestern columnist. A conservative newsletter then amplified the story, sparking outrage among some churchgoers in New York, who feared their donations were being used to fund "pro-Mao, pro-Castro pornography." By 1971, facing this backlash, the churches cut off all funding to LNS.

As a result of this funding crisis, the well-known journalists and activists I.F. Stone, Jack Newfield, Nat Hentoff, and William M. Kunstler wrote a letter of support for LNS that was published in the New York Review of Books. In an appeal for funds, the signers praised the investigative work of LNS, noting that it had "grown from a mimeoed sheet distributed to ten newspapers to a printed 20-page packet of articles and graphics mailed to nearly 800 subscribers twice a week."

=== Decline and dissolution ===
By the middle of the 1970s, with the end of the Vietnam War and the decline of the New Left, LNS began to dwindle along with the rapidly disappearing underground press. In 1976, operations moved downtown to a loft on West 17th Street. Reduced to serving only 150 newspapers, the LNS collective decided to close operations in August 1981.

== New Liberation News Service ==
In 1990, "LNS was restarted as New Liberation News Service with Ray Mungo's blessing by a group of younger radical journalists led by Jason Pramas.... They ... publish[ed] NLNS from their offices in Cambridge, Massachusetts," from 1990 to 1993.

== Archives ==
LNS records are archived variously in the Contemporary Culture Collection of Temple University Libraries, the Archive of Social Change of the University of Massachusetts Amherst Library, Interference Archive, and the Archives & Special Collections at Amherst College; its photographs are archived at New York University's Tamiment Library.

== See also ==
- Alternative news agency
- List of underground newspapers of the 1960s counterculture
