= Chris Faraone =

American journalist

Chris Faraone is a journalist and author in Boston, Massachusetts. He was editor of DigBoston, and editorial director of the Boston Institute for Nonprofit Journalism (BINJ) that he co-founded with Jason Pramas in 2015. He wrote for The Phoenix for several years. He has also written for the Boston Herald, Fast Company, Spin, The Source, JTTS.com, and the Columbia Journalism Review.

== Controversy and confrontation ==
In February 2012, Faraone debated conservative commentator Andrew Breitbart on WRKO, a talk radio station in Boston, over the legitimacy and motives of the Occupy movement. The exchange turned heated and a second debate was to follow, but Breitbart died shortly after the first debate.

After Breitbart’s death, Faraone told the Boston Herald, “I won’t miss Breitbart’s rhetoric, but I’m also not dumb enough to think that it will end with him. If anything, I found his hustle inspirational.”

== 99 Nights with the 99 Percent ==
Faraone's first book, 99 Nights with the 99 Percent, features previously unpublished work, features, profiles, photos, illustrations and more about the Occupy movement. It was released in March 2012. The book was generally well received. The Economist published a review declaring the book to be "absolutely pro-Occupy," while retaining critical perspective.

Justin Peters, of the Columbia Journalism Review, wrote, "He has covered Occupy like a one-man swarm: embedding full-time at Boston’s Dewey Square encampment; visiting other movements around the country; juggling feature stories, blog posts, radio spots, and Twitter fights."

According to The Boston Globe, Faraone "spent more time at the encampment here than any journalist," covering the Occupy movement.

== Heartbreak Hell ==
In the weeks following the Boston Marathon bombings, Faraone released Heartbreak Hell, an ebook consisting of essays and unreported stories from Boston and the scenes of the attack. According to Metro New York, the book "chronicles Faraone's experiences reporting the attack on the marathon — both as a journalist and a self-appointed Bostonian — over many sleepless hours fueled, by his own admission, by a lot of drugs and a lot of heart."

== Awards ==
Faraone has won multiple awards for his reporting on a variety of subjects. In 2010, he won second place at the Association of Alternative Newsmedia's (AAN) annual AltWeekly Awards in the short form news story category. In 2011, he received an honorable mention in AAN's investigative reporting category.
