= Boston (magazine) =

American city magazine

- February 2006 issue
- Editor: Chris Vogel
- Categories: Lifestyle
- Frequency: Monthly
- Circulation: 55,000 per month
- Publisher: Boston Globe Media
- Founded: 1962
- Country: United States
- Based in: Exchange Place, Boston, Massachusetts, U.S.
- Language: English
- Website: bostonmagazine.com
- ISSN: 0006-7989

Boston (also called "Boston magazine" or referred to by the nickname "BoMag") is a regional monthly magazine concerning life in the Greater Boston area, which has been in publication since 1962.

== History ==
Metrocorp Publishing, a Philadelphia-based publishing company also known for owning Philadelphia magazine, acquired the magazine in October 1970 from the Boston Chamber of Commerce, at which time it had been published for "about seven years."

In January 2025, the magazine was acquired by Boston Globe Media, owner of The Boston Globe. Monthly circulation was noted as 75,000 in 2018, 65,000 in 2022, and 55,000 at the time of the acquisition.

As of 2006, the magazine claimed a publication of 500,000 issues per month, with its percentage of newsstand copies sold among the highest of any magazine of any kind in the United States; it was named among the best city magazines in the nation nine times in ten years by the City and Regional Magazine Association.

The cover of Boston magazine's May 2013 issue, which featured a heart-shaped arrangement of running shoes worn by Boston Marathon participants alongside the tagline "We Will Finish the Race," garnered national attention for its tribute to the victims and survivors of the Boston Marathon bombing.

In May 2015, the magazine won a general excellence award from the City and Regional Magazine Association.

Boston magazine is a member of the American Society of Magazine Editors (ASME) and the City and Regional Magazine Association (CRMA)

Like other city and regional magazines, Boston magazine has sections of the magazine dedicated to local dining, culture, and lifestyle. Feature articles cover a range of these topics and local and regional politics and notable figures. Special (generally annual) features include the "Best of Boston" Awards, highlighting top-rated dining, shopping, services, arts, and city life in Boston and surrounding areas; and "100 Most Influential People" and "50 Best Restaurants."

Boston magazine produces two ancillary publications: Boston Home, a quarterly magazine that provides information on home design, renovation, and decoration in the New England area, and Boston Weddings, an annual publication focused on wedding trends, planning advice, and resources for couples in the region.

The current editor-in-chief is Chris Vogel. Former editors-in-chief include Carly Carioli, John Wolfson, and Andrew Putz.
