= Sybil Niden Goldrich =

Sybil Niden Goldrich is a women's health advocate, primarily concerning breast implants.

== Advocacy ==
In 1987, Goldrich, a cancer patient, had serious difficulties with her implants for reconstruction after bi-lateral mastectomy. She learned that the breast implants had never been approved by the U.S. Food and Drug Administration (FDA). She wrote an article on the subject, “Restoration Drama”, which was published in Ms. in June 1988.

She co-founded Command Trust Network, an information clearing house for women to provide information about breast implants and silicone. She actively worked to educate the news media about implants, in an effort to have accurate information about implants disseminated. She has also worked closely with Congressman Ted Weiss, who, before his death, chaired the House Subcommittee with oversight of the FDA. Since then, she has testified multiple times before various House committees, Senate committees, the FDA, and the California State Legislature. Sybil wrote for Beauty and the Breast, a blog about breast implants that she co-authors with actress Mary Elizabeth McDonough.

She continues to monitor silicone issues and advocate for the silicone-afflicted as they move together through the legal system. She is routinely an expert source on the subject for print media and have been featured in stories by all three networks and many cable stations. She is a frequent guest on talk shows and has appeared on Good Morning America, CNN, Nightline, Larry King Live, Oprah, and The Jenny Jones Show, among others. The New York Times, Wall Street Journal and other papers have published a number of her letters to the editor; her op-ed pieces have appeared in syndicated papers across the country. Over the years, stories profiling her continued activities have appeared in People magazine, USA Today and the LA Times, among others.

She was awarded the California Consumer Activist of the Year and named by Los Angeles magazine as one of the “50 Most Interesting People in Los Angeles.” In 2005, the National Organization for Women honored her as one of their 2005 Woman of Action. Lifetime TV and Hearst Entertainment produced and aired Two Small Voices, a movie of the week about her personal experiences, the Command Trust Network and what was, at that time, the largest class action in the history of the United States.

She was born in New York City and is married to James S. Goldrich, MD, a retired obstetrician- gynecologist. They have two daughters and two grandchildren. She earned a BA from Hofstra College, an MA from New York University, and a Certificate from the Stanford University Publishing Program.
