= Philadelphia (magazine) =

American magazine in Pennsylvania

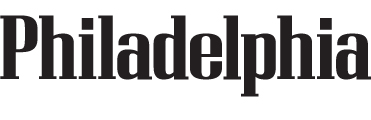

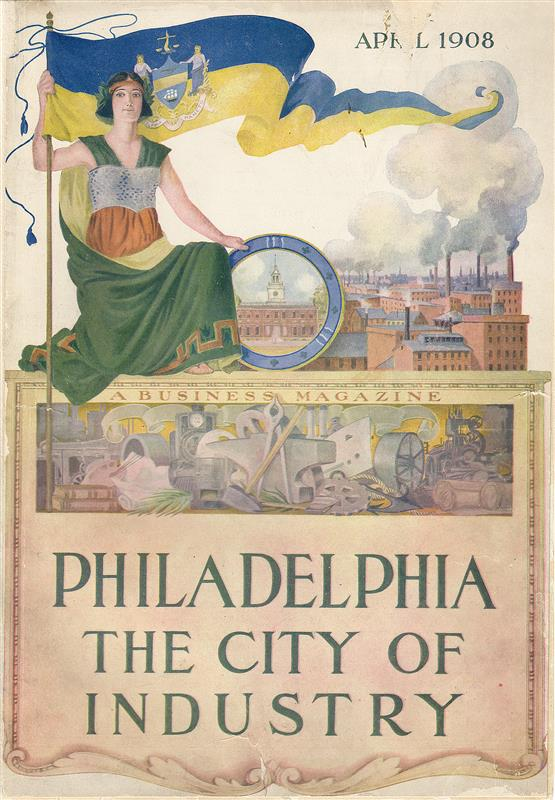
- First issue April 1908
- Editor: Christy Speer Lejeune
- Frequency: Monthly
- Founded: 1908; 118 years ago
- Company: Citizen Media Group
- Country: United States
- Based in: Philadelphia, Pennsylvania, U.S.
- Language: English
- Website: phillymag.com
- ISSN: 0031-7233

Philadelphia (also called "Philadelphia magazine" or referred to by the nickname "Phillymag", once called Greater Philadelphia) is a nonprofit regional magazine published in Philadelphia by Citizen Media Group.

== History ==
=== 20th century ===
One of the oldest magazines of its kind, Philadelphia magazine was first published as a quarterly in 1908 by the Trades League of Philadelphia. S. Arthur Lipson bought the paper in 1946.

The magazine covers Philadelphia and the surrounding counties of Montgomery, Chester, Delaware, and Bucks in Pennsylvania, and Camden and Burlington counties in South Jersey. During summer, coverage expands to include vacation communities along the Jersey Shore.

In 1962, the magazine became the nation's first media outlet to report on a city's gay community and its political engagement in an article about Philadelphia, "The Furtive Fraternity," written by Gaeton Fonzi.

The magazine has been the recipient of seven National Magazine Awards in various categories (1970, 1972, 1977, 1982, 1993, 1994, and 2024).

Like other city and regional magazines, Philadelphia has sections of the magazine dedicated to local dining, entertainment, and special events. Feature articles cover a range of these topics and local and regional politics. Special (generally annual) features include "The Best of Philly" Awards, with summary top ratings of a panoply of products, services, stores, shops and community features; and "Top Doctors", listing top-rated physicians by specialty; and "50 Best Restaurants."

The magazine is a member of the City and Regional Magazine Association (CRMA).

=== 21st century ===
The cover of its May 2007 issue, which featured a photograph of a 31-year-old woman who had undergone the removal of a cancerous growth from her buttocks, caused a minor controversy.

In March 2010, the magazine launched the daily news and opinion site The Philly Post.

In December 2010, it acquired the Philadelphia food blog Foobooz and, in 2012, Tim McManus's and Sheil Kapadia's Birds 24/7, a blog about the Philadelphia Eagles.

The name Philly Post was retired in a September 2013 website redesign, and the site's daily news and opinion content has been incorporated into Philadelphia magazine.

In 2025, Citizen Media Group, a newly formed nonprofit, acquired Philadelphia magazine from Metrocorp Publishing.
