= Howard Street (San Francisco) =

Street in San Francisco, California

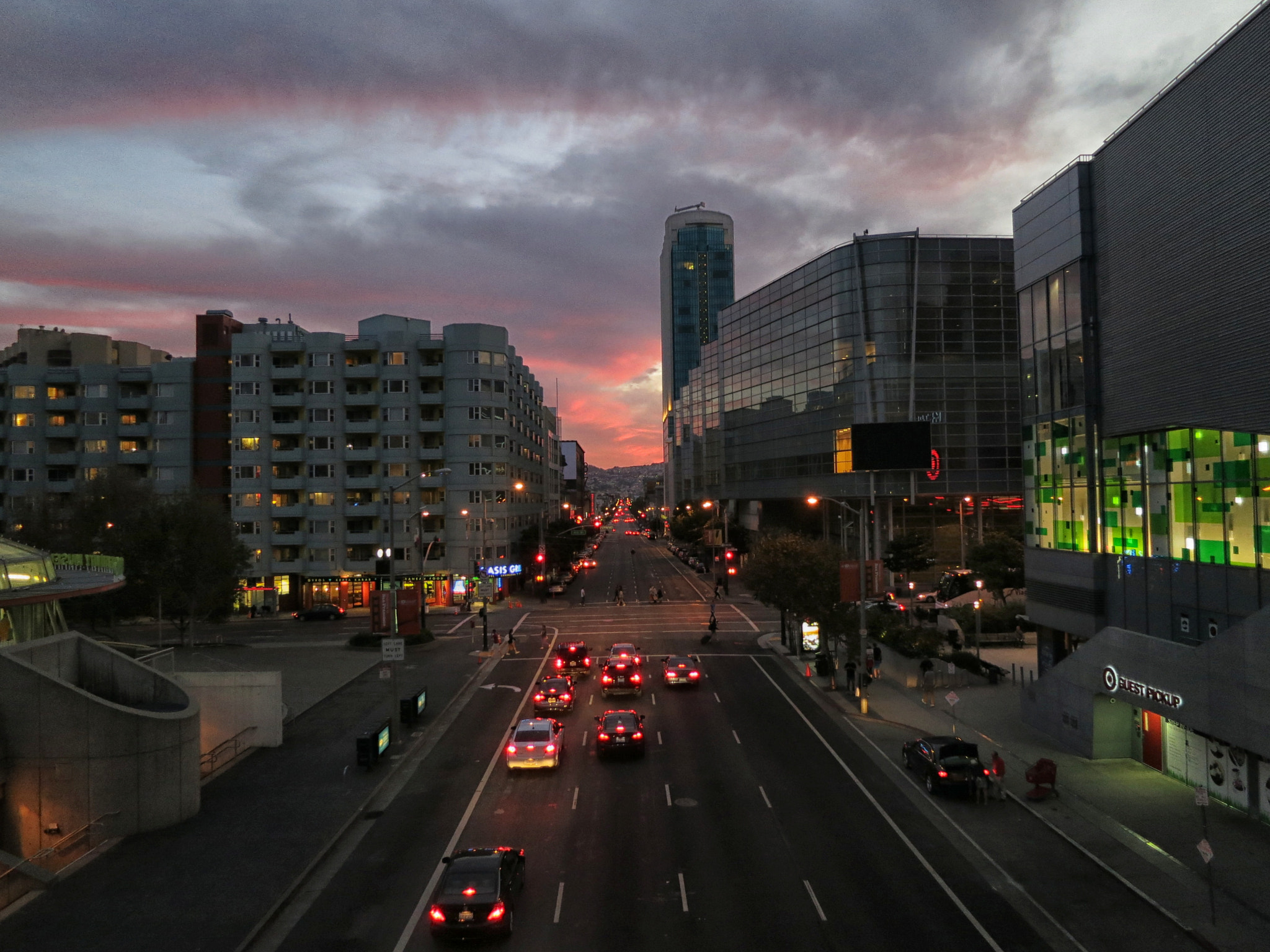
- Interactive map of Howard Street
- Namesake: William Davis Merry Howard
- Maintained by: San Francisco DPW, Caltrans
- Length: 4.2 mi (6.8 km)
- Coordinates: 37.7802°N 122.40653°W
- Southwest end: South Van Ness Avenue
- Northeast end: Embarcadero

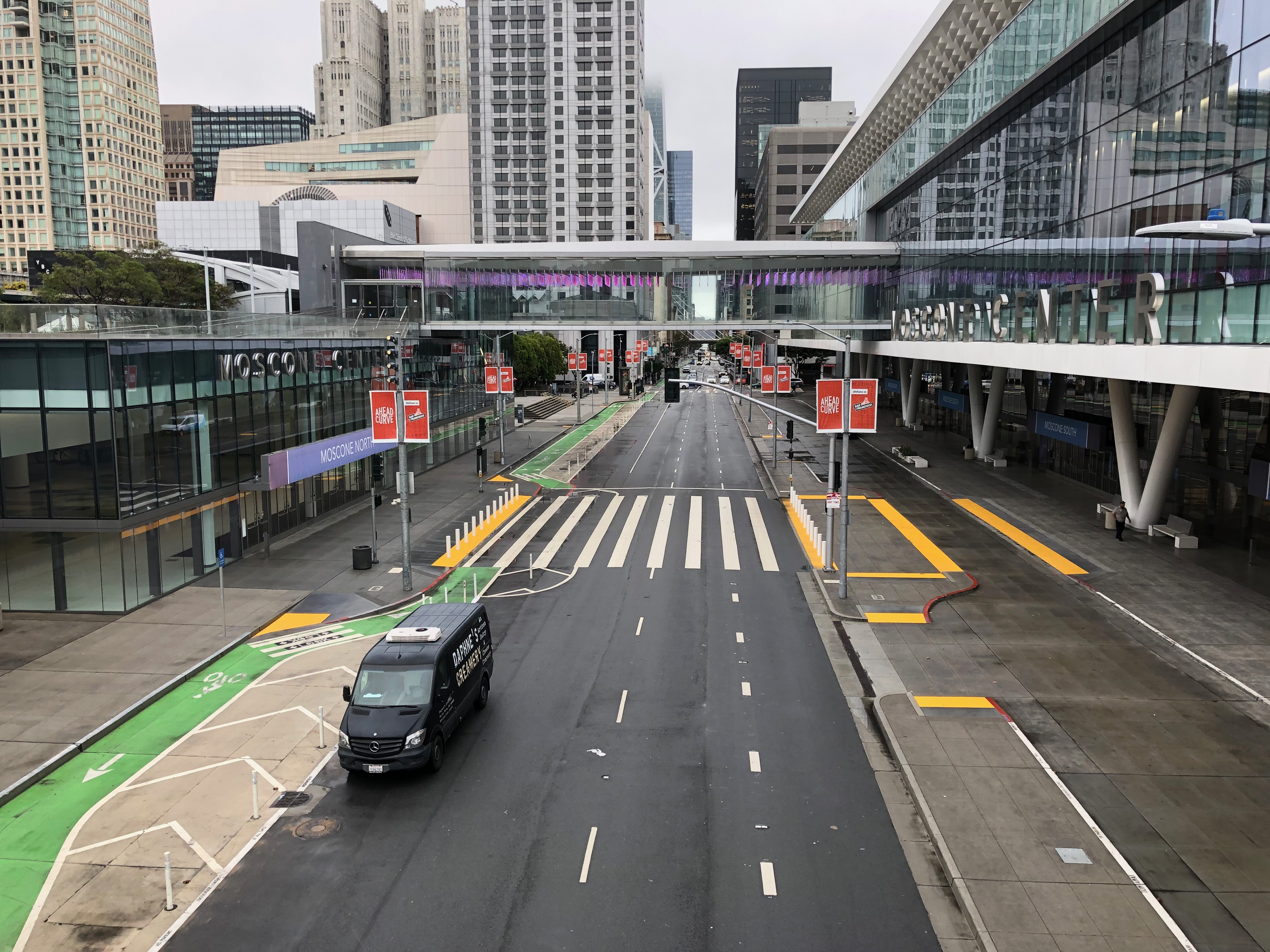
Howard Street as it bisects the Moscone Center, November 2021

Howard Street is a street in San Francisco's South of Market District (SoMa). It begins after branching off from Van Ness Avenue near the Mission District, and then runs parallel to and between of Mission Street (to the North) and Folsom Street (to the South) towards The Embarcadero. Howard Street has the Moscone Center, Rincon Plaza, Yerba Buena Center for the Arts, and The University of San Francisco along its corridor. It is home to the headquarters of Anthropic.

== Namesake ==
It was named after William D. M. Howard, Leading Merchant of Yerba Buena, a native of Boston who came to California in 1839 as a cabin boy on the sailing ship California. For several years he was supercargo on Boston ships trading up and down the Pacific coast, and as such agent in charge of the collection of hides and tallow. In 1845 he and Henry Mellus formed the firm of Mellus & Howard. This firm had the most active commercial business in San Francisco in the years when the settlement was known as Yerba Buena, and in 1846 bought the property of the Hudson’s Bay Company. Howard was one of the town’s most public spirited and prosperous men and was known as the first citizen of San Francisco in the years just before the gold rush.

== See also ==
- How Weird Street Faire (annual electronic music festival on Howard Street, whose name alludes to it)
