= Verandah Porche =

American poet

Verandah Porche (born November 8, 1945) is an American poet living in Guilford, Vermont.

== Biography ==
Porche (/pɔːrʃ/ PORSH; born Linda Jacobs) attended public schools in Teaneck, New Jersey, graduated from Teaneck High School in 1963, and went on to Boston University, graduating in 1968. That same year, with some friends, she founded a commune in southern Vermont called Total Loss Farm where she still lives. Their adventures were chronicled in two books by Ray Mungo: Famous Long Ago, and Total Loss Farm. Porche also contributed significant portions of prose and poetry to Home Comfort: Life on Total Loss Farm, a 1973 collection of stories and essays by residents of the commune, edited by Richard Wizansky.

== Career ==
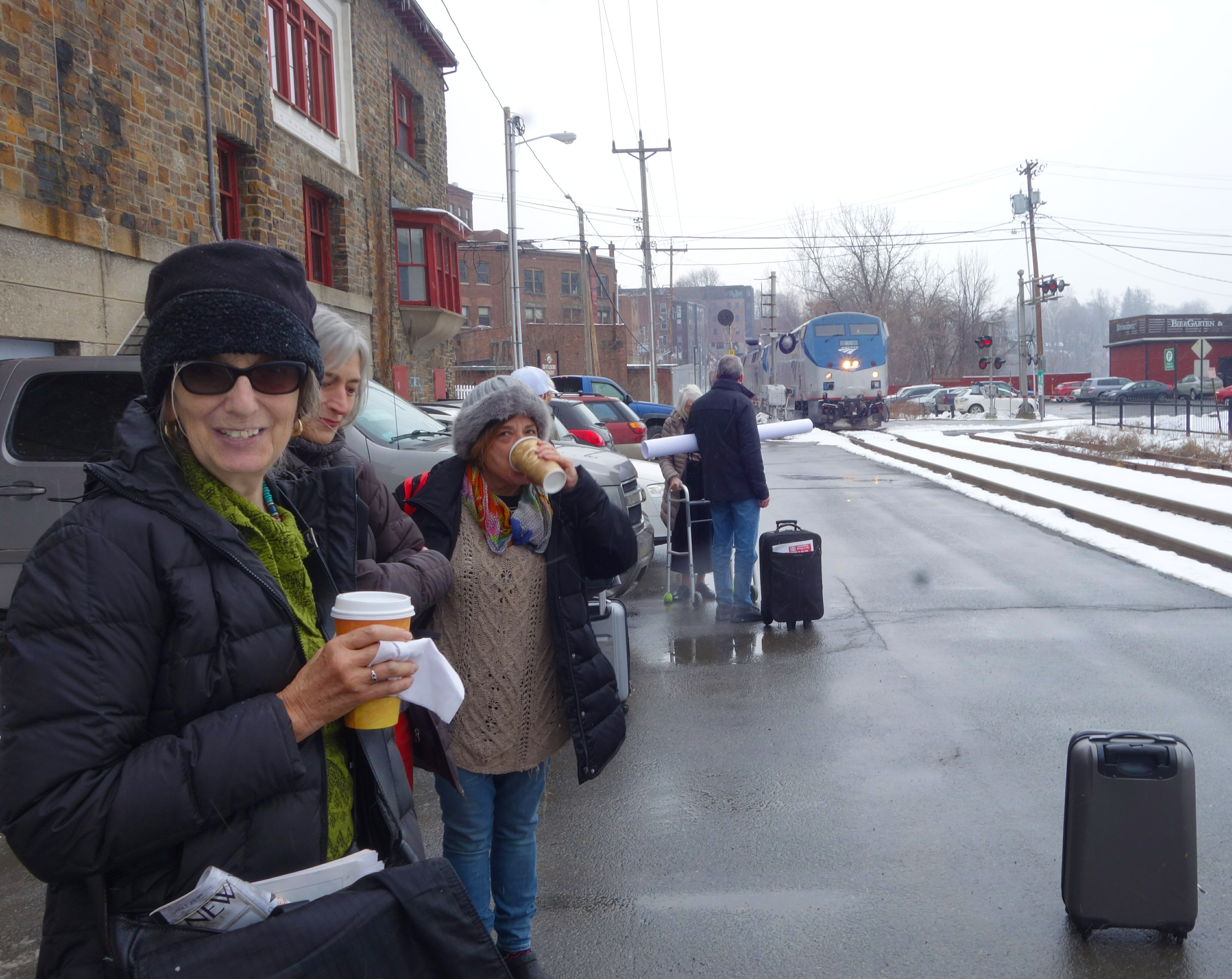
Verandah Porche at Brattleboro Station as the Train Rolls In

Porche has published three books of poetry, The Body's Symmetry, Glancing Off, and Sudden Eden. Sudden Eden, the most recent collection, includes work from the 1990s to the 2010s. Porche has published in Ms., The Atlantic, The Village Voice, The New Boston Review and Vermont Organic Farmer, among others. During the past 30 years, she has traveled from her home in rural Vermont, writing with and for people in grange halls and garages, elementary schools and Elderhostels, nursing homes and daycare centers, mansions and soup kitchens, board rooms and basements, homes and jails, literacy programs and colleges. Porche has developed a practice called "told poetry" or shared narratives that enable people who need a writing partner to create, preserve and share personal literature. She has been engaged in residencies at the Gifford Medical Center in Randolph, Vermont, and Real Artways in Hartford, CT. which resulted in a published collection of her poems titled "Listening Out Loud." Recent residencies include the Police Poetry Project with teenagers and local police in Bennington, VT, and Music of Our Spheres with a 90-member women's chorus in Brattleboro, Vermont. Currently she is collaborating with vocalist and composer Patty Carpenter resulting in the CD Come Over.

== Awards ==
The Vermont Arts Council in 1998 awarded Porche a Citation of Merit for her contribution to the state's cultural life. In 2012, Marlboro College, Marlboro VT awarded her an honorary degree, doctor of humane letters.

== Works ==
- The Body’s Symmetry, (Harper and Row), 1974
- Glancing Off, (See Through Books), 1986
- Welcome To Total Loss Farm. Longhouse, 2006.
- Sudden Eden. Verdant Books, 2012.

=== Anthologies ===
- Robert Pack; Jay Parini, eds. (2002). "Villanelle in April". Contemporary poetry of New England. UPNE. ISBN 978-0-87451-966-2.
