= Michael Haas (political scientist) =

American political scientist (born 1938)

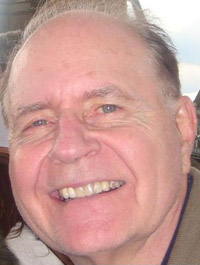
- Born: 1938 (age 87–88)
- Education: Stanford University (BA, PhD); Yale University (MA)
- Occupations: Political scientist; university professor; author
- Known for: Functionalist theory of international relations; U.S. foreign policy studies
- Awards: Nobel Peace Prize nominee
- Scientific career
- Fields: Political science; international relations; human rights
- Workplaces: University of Hawaiʻi at Mānoa

Michael Haas (born 1938) is an American political scientist and former professor at the University of Hawaiʻi at Mānoa. He is noted for his contributions to functionalist theory of international relations and for his writings on U.S. foreign policy. He has authored more than twenty books and over one hundred articles.

== Academic background ==
Haas completed his undergraduate studies at Stanford University in 1959 and received a master's degree awarded by Yale University in 1960. He later earned his Ph.D. from Stanford in 1964.

He was affiliated with San Jose State University when he accepted a position as an assistant professor at the University of Hawaiʻi at Mānoa from 1963 to 1964. He remained a member of the Department of Political Science for several decades, with documented affiliations in 1964, 1974, 1984, 1988, 1990, 1992, and with continued publications and editorial work at the University of Hawaiʻi into the late 1990s.

== Career ==
While on the faculty in Honolulu, he also held temporary positions at Northwestern University, Purdue University, the University of California (Riverside), San Francisco State University, the University of the Philippines, and the University of London.

His research appointments include a United Nations Institute for Training and Research (UNITAR) consultancy at the United Nations Economic and Social Commission for Asia and the Pacific in Bangkok during 1971 and a Fulbright Research Fellowship at the Institute of Southeast Asian Studies on the University of Singapore campus in 1987.

In 1998 he moved to Los Angeles. During the next decade, he held temporary positions at Loyola Marymount University, California State University, Fullerton, California State University, Los Angeles, California State Polytechnic University, Pomona, Rio Hondo College, College of the Canyons, and Occidental College.

In December 2008, he resigned from his latest teaching position to complete George W. Bush, War Criminal? The Liability of the Bush Administration for 269 War Crimes (2009). This book identifies and documents war crimes for which Bush is liable. Nuremberg prosecutor Ben Ferencz wrote a foreword.

Several of his earlier books, including Affirmative Action: An Exchange (1989), Genocide & the Khmer Rouge (1994), US Crimes Without Punishment (2010), The Nisei & Jim Crow (2012), and Obama and Terror (2012), were later discussed in The New York Review of Books.

== Awards ==
Haas has been described as a Nobel Peace Prize nominee and is the author of more than forty books on politics and human rights.

== Selected works ==
- International Conflict (1974)
- The Pacific Way (1989)
- Genocide by Proxy (1991)
- Cambodia, Pol Pot, and the United States (1991)
- Institutional Racism: The Case of Hawaii (1992)
- International Human Rights: A Comprehensive Introduction (2008)
- George W. Bush, War Criminal? (2008)
- America’s War Crimes Quagmire, from Bush to Obama (2010)
- Modern Cambodia’s Emergence from the Killing Fields (2012)
- Asian and Pacific Regional Cooperation (2013)
- Neobehavioral Political Science (2014)
- Why Democracies Flounder and Fail (2018)
- United States Diplomacy with North Korea and Vietnam (2018)
- Donald Trump’s Hidden Agenda for America (2019)
