= Ray Mungo =

American author

- Born: 1946 (age 79–80); Lawrence, Massachusetts, US
- Education: Boston University
- Occupations: Author, activist, counselor
- Known for: Liberation News Service
- Spouse: Robert Yamaguchi

Raymond A. Mungo (born 1946) is an American author, co-author, or editor of more than a dozen books. He writes about business, economics, and financial matters as well as cultural issues.

In the 1960s, he attended Boston University, where he served as editor of the Boston University News in 1966–67, his senior year; and where, as a student leader, he spearheaded demonstrations against the Vietnam War.

In 1967, Mungo co-founded the Liberation News Service (LNS), an alternative news agency, along with Marshall Bloom. LNS split off from Collegiate Press Service (CPS) in a political dispute. The founding event was a notably tumultuous meeting that transpired not far from the offices of CPS on Church Street in Washington, D.C. Mungo descriptively details this event in his book, Famous Long Ago: My Life and Hard Times with the Liberation News Service, published in 1970.

In 1968, he moved to Vermont with Verandah Porche and others as part of the back-to-the-land movement.

Mungo continued to write through the 1970s and 1980s. When he wrote Palm Springs Babylon in 1993 he lived in Palm Springs, California.

In 1997, however, his career path took a different turn. He completed a master's degree in counseling and began working with the severely mentally ill and with AIDS patients in Los Angeles.

Mungo visited France in 2000 and briefly considered relocating there.

== Published works ==
- — (1970). Famous Long Ago: My Life and Hard Times with Liberation News Service. Boston: Beacon Press.
- — (1970). Total Loss Farm: A Year in the Life. New York: E. P. Dutton.
- — (1972). Between Two Moons: A Technicolor Travelogue. Boston: Beacon Press.
- — (1972). Moving on, holding still. New York: Grossman. ISBN 978-0-670-49192-6. OCLC 2636339. Photos by Peter Simon.
- — (1972). Tropical Detective Story: The Flower Children Meet the VooDoo Chiefs. New York: E. P. Dutton. (Fiction)
- — (1973). Home Comfort: With the People of Total Loss Farm. New York: Saturday Review Press.
- — (1975). Return to Sender: When the Fish in the Water was Thirsty. Boston and San Francisco: Houghton Mifflin.
- — (1979). Mungobus. New York: Avon Books. ISBN 978-0380429295. — trilogy containing Famous Long Ago, Total Loss Farm, and Return to Sender in one paperback edition.
- — (1980). Cosmic Profit: How to Make Money Without Doing Time. Boston: Atlantic Little Brown.
- — (1983). Confessions from Left Field. New York: E. P. Dutton Co.
- — (1986). Lit Biz 101. New York: Dell Publishing.
- — (1990). Beyond the Revolution. Chicago: Contemporary Books.
- — (1990). Famous Long Ago: My Life and Hard Times with Liberation News Service, at Total Loss Farm, and on the Dharma Trail. New York: Citadel Underground Classics, Carol Publishing. — trilogy of Famous Long Ago, Total Loss Farm, and Return to Sender in one paperback edition.
- — (1992). The Learning Annex Guide to Getting Successfully Published. New York: Carol Publishing.
- — (1993). Palm Springs Babylon: Sizzling Stories from the Desert Playground of the Stars. New York, NY: St. Martin's Press.
- — (1993). No Credit Required: How to Buy a House when you Don't Qualify for a Mortgage. New York: New American Library.
- — (1994). Your Autobiography: Over 300 Questions to Help You Write Your Life Story. New York: Macmillan Publishers.
- — (1995). Liberace. Lives of Notable Gay Men and Lesbians. Chelsea House. Series editor: Martin Duberman.
- — (1996). San Francisco Confidential. New York: Carol Publishing.
