= Thorne Webb Dreyer =

American journalist (born 1945)

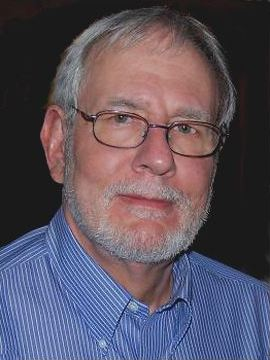
- Thorne Webb Dreyer, 2009
- Born: August 1, 1945 (age 81); Houston, Texas, U.S.
- Education: University of Texas at Austin
- Occupations: Writer, editor, blogger, broadcaster
- Known for: Prominent Sixties underground journalist and activist
- Website: https://www.theragblog.com/

Thorne Webb Dreyer (born August 1, 1945) is an American writer, editor, publisher, and political activist who played a major role in the 1960s-1970s counterculture, New Left, and underground press movements. Dreyer now lives in Austin, Texas, where he edits the progressive internet news magazine, The Rag Blog, hosts Rag Radio on KOOP 91.7-FM, and is a director of the New Journalism Project.

In June 2012 Dreyer topped a published list of Austin's most important political bloggers, and in 2011 received the noted Eddy Award for best Austin radio personality.

Dreyer was "an influential journalist in the underground press movement of the 1960s and early 1970s," according to the documentary encyclopedia, Conflicts in American History, which included him in a series of 73 short biographies of key figures in "The Postwar and Civil Rights Era: 1945-1973" in the United States.

He was a founder and editor of two of the most important of the Sixties underground newspapers, The Rag in Austin and Space City! in Houston, was an editor at Liberation News Service (LNS) in New York, and managed Pacifica Radio's KPFT 90.1-FM in Houston.

Thorne Dreyer was active in Students for a Democratic Society (SDS), the moving force in the 1960s New Left and perhaps the most important student-based activist organization in U.S. history. Dreyer's writing was published worldwide and his work has been cited or excerpted in more than 100 books.

== Family and early life ==
An only child, Dreyer was born in Houston, Texas, on August 1, 1945, the son of Martin Dreyer and Margaret Lee Webb. He attended Bellaire High School, where he studied theater with noted teacher and director Cecil Pickett – who later taught at the University of Houston and whose students included actors Dennis and Randy Quaid and Cindy Pickett. Dreyer later studied acting with William Hickey at New York's HB Studio, and briefly attended the University of Texas at Austin where he took liberal arts and theater courses.

Dreyer's family was at the center of a large literary and activist community in Houston. His mother, Margaret Webb Dreyer, was an acclaimed artist, teacher, and peace activist – and a leading light in the local cultural scene—and his father, Martin Dreyer, was a fiction writer and long-time travel editor at the Houston Chronicle and was a winner of the national Big Story Award for "investigative journalism in the interest of justice." Sandra J. Levy, writing in the Archives of American Art Journal, called Margaret Webb Dreyer "a moving force in Houston from the 1940s to the 1970s," and she is included in the University of Texas at Austin's Gallery of Great Texas Women and her biography is featured at the Handbook of Texas Online. The couple owned and ran Dreyer Galleries, one of Houston's earliest and most prominent art galleries. According to Cite's Raj Mankad, Dreyer Galleries also "served as a countercultural hub," hosting art openings, political meetings, and social gatherings attended by Jane Fonda, Robert Altman, Warren Hinckle, and others.

While in Houston, Thorne Dreyer engaged in an eclectic array of pursuits. He worked professionally as an actor, a freelance writer and editor, a political consultant, a correspondent for Texas Monthly magazine, a public information officer for the City of Houston, a booking agent for jazz and rock musicians, an event planner, and a bookseller—and for years operated a leading Houston public relations business.

He has one son, Dustin Dreyer, who lives in Houston.

== SDS and radical activism ==
In 1963, Dreyer went to Austin to attend the University of Texas, but soon joined SDS and became heavily involved in the New Left—in student power and civil rights activities and the fast-growing movement against the Vietnam War. He organized demonstrations and guerrilla theater actions and helped put together the now-legendary Gentle Thursday happenings on the University of Texas campus.

"In the '60s my values crystallized," Dreyer would later tell Karen Kane, in the December 7, 1980, issue of the Houston Chronicle's Texas Magazine. "What happened during those years I will carry with me the rest of my life.... We had visions of a better world, and dedicated ourselves to building it." Kane wrote that Dreyer "was on the cutting edge" of the 1960s movement. Dreyer traveled widely, participating in SDS conferences and national demonstrations and gatherings of the burgeoning underground media.

In 1966, as part of an SDS summer project, Dreyer helped run a radical storefront in the Haight-Ashbury district of San Francisco. In September 1967, Dreyer was one of 40 peace activists, religious leaders, and movement journalists invited to travel to Bratislava, Czechoslovakia, for a direct meeting with high-level representatives of the North Vietnamese and the National Liberation Front of South Vietnam, in what was an unprecedented effort to explore new avenues for peace. Sol Stern wrote that "for the first time, high-ranking NLF representatives would... be included in discussions with American peace activists." Author Mary Hershberger wrote that the meeting, organized by SDS founder Tom Hayden and peace activist David Dellinger, "resulted in the first prisoner of war release to American peace activists."

In her book, Dreams and Everyday Life, Penelope Rosemont wrote about the historic demonstrations outside the 1968 Democratic National Convention in Chicago. "Thorne Dreyer came into town from Austin, Texas, to edit the SDS wall poster called Handwriting on the Wall," she said. Handwriting on the Wall was published each night during the convention and posted all over town, playing an important role in keeping the thousands of demonstrators informed about the week's cascading events. These wall posters were featured in the 2011 exhibit, "Left to Right: Radical Movements of the 1960s," at the Lyndon Baines Johnson Library and Museum in Austin.

== The Rag ==
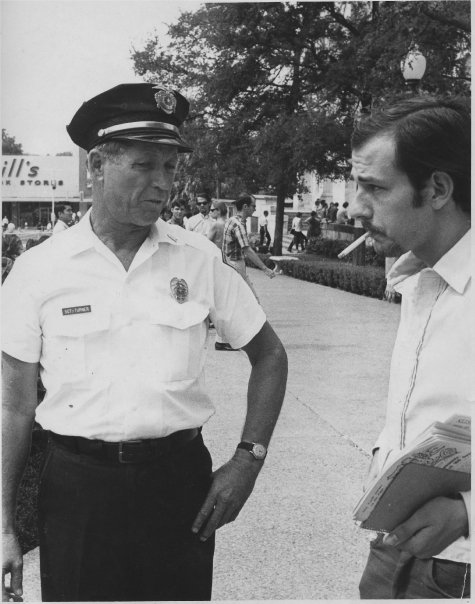
Thorne Dreyer (right) and University of Texas campus cop, October 1966.

In October 1966, the first issue of The Rag was published in Austin—partly in response to the election of an ultra-conservative editor of the traditionally-liberal UT student newspaper, The Daily Texan—with Thorne Dreyer and Carol Neiman as editors. (They were actually called "funnels," in keeping with the group's anti-authoritarian approach.) In his acclaimed memoir, Famous Long Ago, Ray Mungo wrote that "The Rag's chief 'funnel,' Thorne Dreyer, exercises an authority that is gentle and decent."

The Rag was the first underground paper in the South and the sixth member of the Underground Press Syndicate (UPS). Cited by historian Laurence Leamer as "one of the few legendary undergrounds," The Rag was credited with being the first of its genre to successfully combine the radical politics of the New Left with the spirit of the burgeoning alternative culture, and, according to historian John McMillian, it served as a model for many papers that followed.

Abe Peck, author of Uncovering the Sixties: The Life and Times of the Underground Press, wrote that "The Rag was the first independent undergrounder to represent... the participatory democracy, community organizing and synthesis of politics and culture that the New Left of the midsixties was trying to develop." Author Douglas C. Rossinow, described The Rag as "enormously important to local activists," and historian McMillian said that The Rag was regarded by the Austin community as "a beautiful and precious thing."

The paper tempered serious political analysis with ample doses of humor, and The Rag provided a primary forum for two of the Sixties underground graphic artists – Gilbert Shelton, whose iconic Fabulous Furry Freak Brothers comix would be republished in papers all over the world, and Jim Franklin, whose surrealist armadillos helped create what writer Hermes Nye called "the Great Armadillo Cult." Austin was also the center of an active left political community based at the University of Texas campus and was a major player in the massive Sixties drug and music culture. The city incubated talents like Janis Joplin, the Thirteenth Floor Elevators, and some of the pioneering psychedelic poster and comix artists. The Rag united these communities into a potent political force.

== Underground press and LNS ==
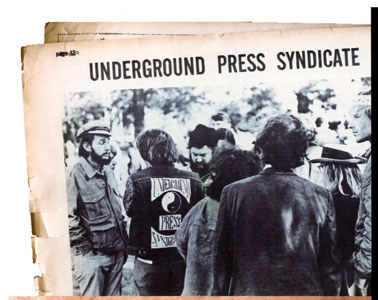
Thorne Dreyer (far left) at first underground newspaper gathering, Stinson Beach, California, March 1967.

Thorne Dreyer heralded the coming of The Rag ("from deep in the bowels of reaction... where apathy and dullness thrive") in a letter addressed to the founding members of the Underground Press Syndicate. This colorful dispatch — dated October 5, 1966 — is included as a historical document in Conflicts in American History, a 13-volume encyclopedia published in 2010.

On March 26, 1967, Dreyer and Carol Neiman attended the first national convergence of underground papers at Stinson Beach, California. Historian Abe Peck wrote that "at Stinson Beach, the paper that most prefigured those to come [The Rag] was represented... by several writers, including the increasingly important Thorne Dreyer." Dreyer also participated in a historic meeting of the United States Student Press Association (USSPA) in Minneapolis in August 1967 at the invitation of its newly elected director, Marshall Bloom. At the meeting Bloom was purged from USSPA because of his radical politics (and, some thought, because of what John McMillian refers to as Bloom's "effeminate demeanor"). Bloom and colleague Ray Mungo then founded Liberation News Service (LNS).

The underground press started out with a handful of papers on the East and West Coasts, but soon spread and, according to historian McMillian, author of the 2011 book Smoking Typewriters: The Sixties Underground Press and the Rise of Alternative Media in America, the papers' combined readership eventually reached into the millions. Rolling Stone's John Burks quoted Thorne Dreyer as saying that the Underground Press Syndicate (UPS) was organized "to create the illusion of a giant coordinated network of freaky papers poised for the kill." But, as McMillian and others would emphasize, the underground press was no illusion, and in fact played a vital and dynamic role in the 1960s cultural revolution.

According to historian James Lewes, "A number of underground newsworkers – including Marshall Bloom, Thorne Dreyer, Ray Mungo, and Victoria Smith – argued that their papers filled a vacuum left by the collective failure of mainstream media to address the needs of the growing counterculture and anti-Vietnam War movements." John Leo wrote in The New York Times that the underground press was "consciously subjective" and "rooted in personal experience." Leo quoted Dreyer as saying that "objectivity is a farce," and that the underground papers were different from the establishment media because they were upfront about their biases.

In 1968, Thorne Dreyer left The Rag to help build the editorial collective at Liberation News Service in New York City. LNS, which was becoming the hub for alternative journalism in the United States, supplied the growing movement media with interpretive coverage of current events and reports on movement activities and the Sixties counterculture. In a history of Liberation News Service, Allen Young — who had worked for both The Washington Post and LNS — wrote: "The people of the underground press helped forge a national youth culture and in both subtle and direct ways influenced their colleagues in the 'establishment media.'"

During this time Dreyer's writings were widely distributed, appearing regularly in dozens of periodicals. His coverage of the March 27, 1967, anti-war action at the Pentagon in Washington – with its massive acts of civil disobedience – was distributed by LNS and published around the world. Called "an exuberant, emotional, firsthand account" by historian John McMillian, Dreyer's Pentagon commentary has been excerpted in a number of books about the era, including Norman Mailer's award-winning Armies of the Night. In the scholarly journal Genre, Bimbisar Irom referred to Dreyer's "dissenting, unassimilated... powerful individual voice," noting that he was close "to Mailer's own political sensibilities as an 'independent radical'...."

In 1969 LNS published a long essay co-authored by Thorne Dreyer and Victoria Smith, titled "The Movement and the New Media," which was considered to be the first serious journalistic portrait of the increasingly powerful underground press phenomenon. Dreyer also wrote extensively about the growing repression of underground papers throughout the country.

== Space City! and the KKK ==
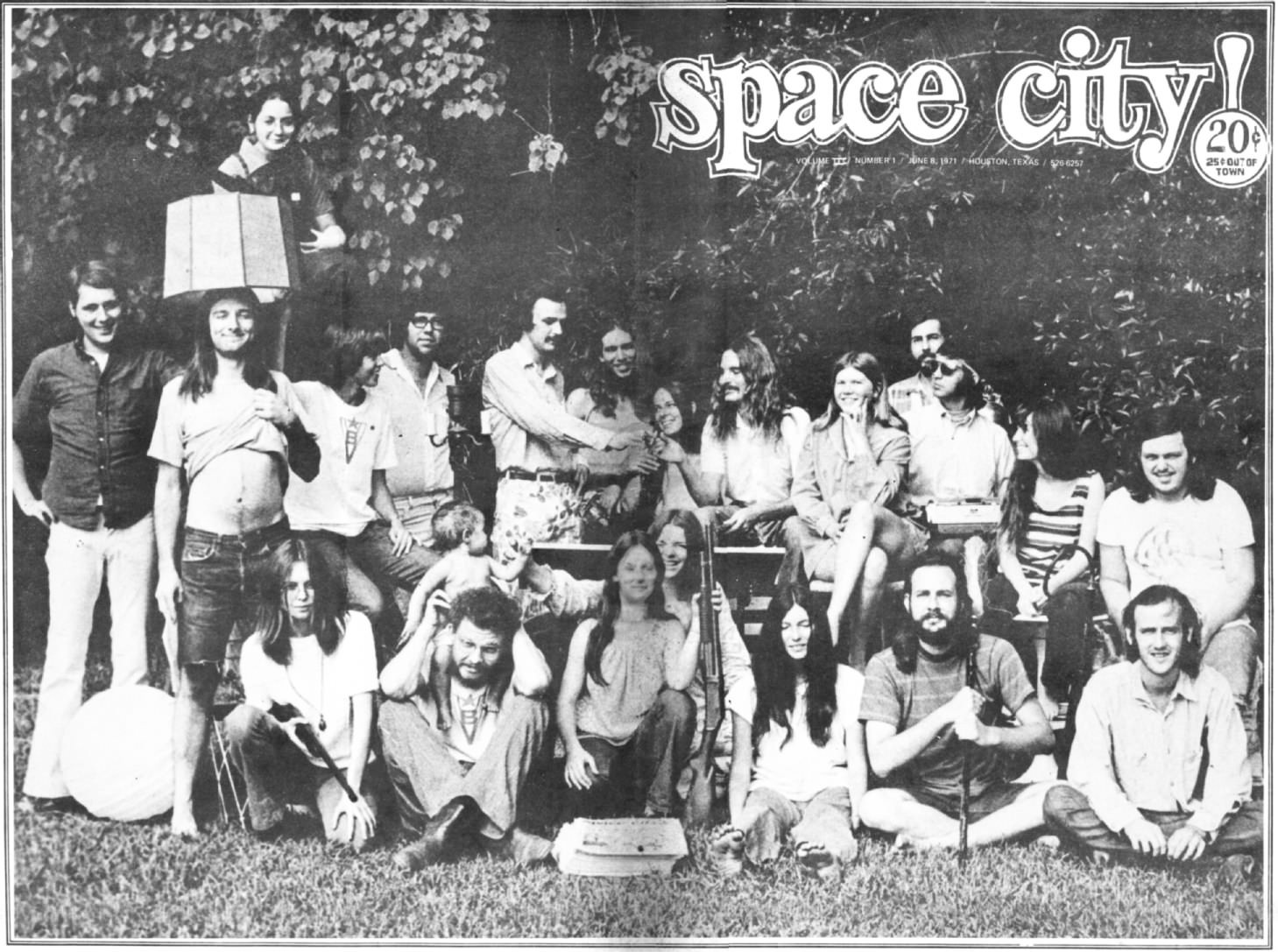
Cover of Space City!, Houston, Texas, Vol. 3, No. 1, June 8, 1971, with photo of the paper's staff. Thorne Dreyer is second from right in front row.

In his book The Paper Revolutionaries: The Rise of the Underground Press, Laurence Leamer called Houston's Space City! "unquestionably one of the strongest underground papers in America." In Leamer's words, the paper "had a special importance in Houston since the city is a sprawled-out, Texas version of Los Angeles. The paper holds the radical community together."

Space City! (originally called Space City News) was founded June 5, 1969, by Dreyer and Victoria Smith – who had worked together at LNS in New York – in coordination with former Rag staffers Dennis Fitzgerald and Judy Gitlin Fitzgerald, and community organizers Cam Duncan and Sue Mithun Duncan. The staff was run as a collective, with all editorial and production responsibilities being shared, and in the beginning the three couples also lived together in a communal home, sharing meals and chores.

Space City! contained content regarding advocacy journalism, power structure research, and arts coverage.

In a 1976 book about modern Texas folklore, Hermes Nye wrote that "the dark-haired bespectacled, lovely Victoria Smith and her compadre, dashing mustachioed Thorne Dreyer... helped lay the cornerstone of Houston's Space City!... a well written, sprightly sheet... [that] also had an eye for vivid, telling graphics and poetry of a high level." Historian Leamer wrote about Space City!: "There is a solid intelligence to the reviews and cultural articles... It is a radical journalism grounded in fact... resolved and balanced in content and full of common purpose..."

John Siemssen, writing in Houston's Other, quoted former Space City! staffer Bobby Eakin: "Thorne [Dreyer] was the glue that held the paper together..." Eakin added, "When it was tense and they were ready to tear into each other, Thorne would hop on a chair and recite a [humorous] monologue."

Unlike The Rag, Space City! met with violent opposition from some elements in the community, facing the wrath of right wing vigilantes openly identified with a local Ku Klux Klan group. As Victoria Smith wrote in Ken Wachsberger's Insider Histories of the Vietnam Era Underground Press, "we endured break-ins, thefts, tire-slashings, potshots (including a steel arrow fired from a crossbow through the front door), and threats, both to staff members and advertisers."

Raj Mankad wrote at OffCite that the Klan's violent actions against Space City! were part of a larger picture of "threats and acts of violence against progressive and radical institutions in Houston. The KPFT [Pacifica] station transmitter was bombed off the air twice. Bullets were shot at and yellow paint thrown on the walls of Margaret Webb Dreyer's gallery," which was located a few blocks from the Space City! offices.

== Progressive politics and public relations ==
After Space City! shut its doors, Thorne Dreyer worked with KPFT-FM, the listener-supported Pacifica radio station in Houston, where he hosted "The Briarpatch," a long-running interview and talk show, and turned the station's monthly programming guide into an underground-style tabloid called the Mighty 90 News. Dreyer would also serve for a time as the station's general manager.

During this period he became active in the progressive wing of the Democratic Party in Harris County and was on the Texas staff of George McGovern's anti-war presidential campaign. He edited a statewide campaign tabloid, served as a McGovern delegate to the Texas State Democratic Convention, and attended the party's national convention at Miami Beach in 1972. He was also a supporter and friend of Houston's young progressive mayor, Fred Hofheinz, working in his campaign and then working as a public information officer in the City of Houston's Model Cities Department during the Hofheinz administration.

In 1975 Dreyer and Teague Cavness started an advertising and public relations partnership called Dreyer Cavness Associates that specialized in progressive political campaigns. They managed Kathy Whitmire's successful 1978 campaign for Houston City Controller, the city's second most powerful elected position. Whitmire, who would serve two terms as Controller and then five terms as Mayor of Houston, was the first woman elected to citywide office in Houston. After the election, Teague Cavness left the partnership to serve as Whitmire's chief aide and Dreyer continued in business as Thorne Dreyer Associates.

During this time Thorne Dreyer gained a reputation as an event planner for political campaigns, charities, and arts organizations. In 1978, The Houston Post ran a feature story with the headline, "Political parties: The campaign get-together taking on aura of best show in any town, thanks to Thorne Dreyer," in which writer Gary Christian said, "Dreyer, 32-year-old public relations man making a name for himself with his party-planning, is out to defeat that deadly seriousness surrounding political parties..." Dreyer's lively, creative events – that pulled together people from the arts and political communities—were cited by The Texas Observer as the best political parties in the state. Dreyer also worked as a feature writer and correspondent for the early Texas Monthly magazine and as a booking agent and personal manager for jazz and rock musicians – including popular jazz singer Cy Brinson—and handled advertising, promotion, and booking for a number of popular Houston clubs and music venues, including Cody's, Rockefeller's, and Mum's Jazzplace, where he also served as a manager. Dreyer also worked for Half Price Books, buying and selling used and rare books, and later ran an online bookselling business.

During the 1990s, according to the Austin American-Statesman's Brad Buchholz, Thorne Dreyer "suffered through a divorce, depression and two prison sentences for cocaine possession." Dreyer weathered a time of major personal crisis, struggling with severe clinical depression, the breakup of his marriage, and a long-standing bout with drug use. At a time when prosecution for cocaine possession was at its most severe, Dreyer was twice arrested and convicted for possession of small quantities of the controlled substance. During this time Dreyer did little productive work. Many veterans of the Sixties New Left experienced similar periods of crisis and "burnout," and a few, like Dreyer's friend Abbie Hoffman, even committed suicide.

But Thorne would soon turn his life around as he reunited with old friends and colleagues and once again became committed to the spirit of social change.

== Rag Reunion and The Rag Blog ==
On Labor Day weekend in 2005 in Austin, Thorne Dreyer joined as many as 100 former staffers and followers of The Rag for an historic three-day reunion that included a series of spirited meetings, social events, concerts, and art shows. Inspired by the Rag Reunion and the renewed contacts, energy, and commitment that grew out of it, Dreyer moved back to Austin in 2006, and once again became involved in alternative journalism and political organizing.

Dreyer now edits The Rag Blog, an Internet newsmagazine that has built a wide and loyal following in the progressive blogosphere. He is also host and producer of Rag Radio, a popular weekly interview show, and serves as a director of the New Journalism Project, a Texas 501(c)(3) nonprofit corporation, that publishes The Rag Blog.

Melanie Scruggs wrote in 2012 that "The Rag simply went dormant, and in fact, has come to life... as a blog initiated at the Rag Reunion... and Funnelled by none other than Thorne Dreyer himself. The Rag legacy carries onward even as so few people of the new Austin generation appreciate the impact that it had on their city and so much of what makes it a vibrant place to live."

In a June 2012 feature on Austin's leading political bloggers, CultureMap Austin put Thorne Dreyer and The Rag Blog at the top of its list. Pointing out that Dreyer and The Rag "both came of age in the tumultuous sixties," author Shelley Seale wrote, "The Rag Blog features commentary on contemporary politics and culture and has been an original internet source on subjects like Occupy Wall Street, the environmental and sustainability movements, and other issues of social activism."

The Rag Blog, which was founded in 2006 by Richard Jehn, has developed global reach and in 2011 had its one millionth visitor. Many of The Rag Blog's contributors are veterans of the original Rag and the Sixties underground press. The editorial core group includes Sarito Carol Neiman, Dreyer's original Rag co-editor who later edited SDS' New Left Notes; former Rag staffers Mariann Wizard and Alice Embree (who also worked with New York's Rat and was active in the Women's Liberation Movement); filmmaker and writer William Michael Hanks; and art director James Retherford, who edited The Spectator, a Sixties underground paper published in Bloomington, Indiana, and was active with the YIPPIES.

Historian and publisher Paul Buhle said in 2009 that "The Rag Blog is in many ways what The Rag... was in the middle 1960s, a light in the darkness... not only readable but funny," calling it "the best place for insights in the entire blogosphere that I follow."

Rag Radio is a weekly public affairs program that features hour-long in-depth interviews with prominent figures in politics and the arts. Rag Radio is broadcast every Friday from 2-3 p.m. (Central) on KOOP 91-7 FM, an all-volunteer cooperatively-run community radio station in Austin, and is rebroadcast every Sunday at 10 a.m. (Eastern) on WFTE, 90.3-FM in Mt. Cobb, PA, and 105.7-FM in Scranton, PA. Rag Radio also has a widespread Internet following and all episodes are posted as podcasts at the Internet Archive.

Dreyer also helped set up an Austin chapter of Movement for a Democratic Society (MDS), associated with the newly reestablished SDS. The group organized demonstrations around opposition to the U.S. war in Iraq and other progressive issues. Dreyer was involved with Progressives for Obama, which offered critical support to Barack Obama during his initial campaign for president (the organization has continued under the name Progressive America Rising), and has also helped organize a series of cultural and educational activities in Austin through the New Journalism Project.

After a long drought, Dreyer began writing again, with his work appearing on The Rag Blog and around the Internet. He is a contributing editor to the online Next Left Notes and in 2006 wrote a major cover story for The Texas Observer called "The Spies of Texas" featuring exclusive revelations about how the UT-Austin campus police tracked the lives of dissidents and iconoclasts in the Sixties.

== The Rag in the digital age ==
John McMillian writes that "some of what's happening in the left-wing blogosphere can... be compared to the Sixties underground press," and Thorne Dreyer told the Austin Chronicle's Kevin Brass that "There are a lot of similarities in the two eras." Brass, indeed, sees The Rag Blog as "part of an effort to revive some of the rabble-rousing counterculture spirit of the Sixties." Yet, Kevin Brass writes, Dreyer and The Rag Blog are "working in a media landscape light-years removed from the offset printing presses of their youth. While the original Rag would be lucky to sell 15,000 copies on Austin street corners... on any given day, a Rag [blog] post might pingpong through the digital atmosphere, creating the type of traffic the kids of the Sixties couldn't imagine, not even with the right psychedelics."

Dreyer, who has referred to recent changes in his personal life and his renewed commitment to social change and activist journalism as a "virtual rebirth," told Austin's public radio station, KUT-FM, that "our strength is in being together and realizing that we're not alone, and I think that's why the Internet has been very useful... in helping to uncover injustices and... in helping people feel like they're part of something larger."

In a 2008 feature story in the Austin American-Statesman, Brad Buchholz wrote: "Thorne Dreyer's belief system for a new millennium is anchored in community and participation and a sense of humor. As a younger man, he led a charge to change the world, thinking it his generation's calling. Today, Dreyer has the gentle feeling at times that the movement has repaid the favor and saved him."

== Selected articles by Thorne Dreyer ==
- "The Spies of Texas: Newfound files detail how UT-Austin police tracked the lives of Sixties dissidents," by Thorne Dreyer, The Texas Observer, November 16, 2006.
- "The Movement and the New Media," by Thorne Dreyer and Victoria Smith, Liberation News Service, March 1, 1969.
- "Rag Radio: Carl Davidson on Mondragon and Workers' Cooperatives," by Thorne Webb Dreyer, Truthout, September 20, 2011.
- "The Mad Mix: Montrose, The Heart of Houston," by Thorne Dreyer, CITE: The Architecture and Design Magazine of Houston, Summer 2010
- "Montrose Lives: Houston’s Montrose: The strangest neighborhood east of the Pecos" by Thorne Dreyer and Al Reinert, Texas Monthly, April 1973.
- "Sixties Radicals: Whatever Happened to the New Generation," by Thorne Dreyer, Texas Monthly, November 1976.
- "People call for revolution: Pentagon up-tight," by Thorne Dreyer, The Rag, August 30, 1967. (Simultaneously published in the Washington Free Press and then distributed by Liberation News Service.)
- "God Goes to the Astrodome," by Thorne Dreyer, Texas Monthly, January 1974.

== Documents ==
- "Letter to the Underground Press Syndicate," by Thorne Dreyer, October 5, 1966. (The Rag Archives).

== Interviews ==
- Dreyer, Thorne Webb and Louis J. Marchiafava. Thorne Webb Dreyer Oral History, Houston Oral History Project, July 15, 1976.
- Thorne Dreyer interviewed by Jeff Farias, April 29, 2010 (25 min.).
- Thorne Dreyer and Sherwood Bishop discuss underground newspaper Space City! and Sixties Houston at Zine Fest Houston 2009.
- Interview with Thorne Dreyer by Texas Public Radio about "Spies of Texas," Nov. 24, 2006
- "The Eyes of Texas Were Upon Texas Radicals," Interview with Thorne Dreyer on News 8 Austin, Video and Transcript, 2006.
- Video interview with Thorne Dreyer and others from the Rag Reunion, September 2005, by People's History in Texas, 2005.
- "Veteran activist pinpoints 1960s spirit in Occupy movement" Interview by John A. Salazar for YNN, Time Warner Cable, 2011
- Jeff Zavala's videos of Thorne Dreyer's Rag Radio interviews with Scott Crow, Robert Jensen, and Diane Wilson, at The Rag Blog, 2011.
- Podcast of Thorne Dreyer and Alice Embree speaking about The Rag and the Underground Press at Public Affairs Forum, First Unitarian Universalist Church, Austin, February 19, 2012. Broadcast by People United, KOOP-FM, Austin

== Partial bibliography ==
=== Books ===
- Abernethy, Francis Edward, What's Going On? In Modern Texas Folklore (Austin: The Encino Press, 1976), Nye, Hermes, "Texas Tea and Rainy Day Woman," p. 118
- Anderson, Terry H., The Movement and the Sixties (New York : Oxford University Press, 1995), p. 178.
- Baunstein, Peter and Doyle, Michael William, Imagine Nation : the American Counterculture of the 1960s and '70s (New York : Routledge, 2002), pp. 107, 113
- Bizot, Jean-Francois, Free Press: Underground & Alternative Publications, 1965–1975, (New York: Universe, 2006), Cover and pp. 4–5. Photograph.
- Burks, John, "The Underground Press," The Age of Paranoia: How the Sixties Ended (New York: Pocket Books, 1972), p. 17
- Fixx, James F, Ed., New York Times: The Great Contemporary Issues: The Mass Media and Politics, (New York: Arno Press, 1972.) pp. 96–98.
- Garvy, Helen, Rebels With a Cause : A Collective Memoir of the Hopes, Rebellions and Repression of the 1960s (Los Gatos, California : Shire Press, 2007), p. 112.
- Giles, Robert and Robert W. Snyder, 1968 : Year of Media Decision (New Brunswick, New Jersey : Transaction Publishers, 1998), pp. 148, 170.
- Glessing, Robert J., The Underground Press in America (Bloomington, Indiana : The Indiana University Press, 1970), pp. 36, 49. (spelled "Dryer")
- Hare, A. Paul and Herbert H. Blumberg, Nonviolent Direct Action: American Cases: Social-Psychological Analyses, (Washington and Cleveland: Corpus Books, 1968), pp. 266–267.
- Kengor, Paul, Dupes: How America's Adversaries Have Manipulated Progressives for a Century, (Wilmington, DE, ISI Books, 2010), p. 467.
- Leamer, Laurence, The Paper Revolutionaries : The Rise of the Underground Press (New York : Simon and Schuster, 1972), pp. 41, 44–45, 47, 62, 63, 66, 104, 105, 108
- Lewes, James, Protest and Survive: Underground GI Newspapers during the Vietnam War, (Westport, CT, Praeger, 2003), pp. 38, 46, 67.
- Mailer, Norman, The Armies of the Night : History as a Novel : The Novel as History (New York : New American Library, 1968), pp. 274–5.
- McMillian, John, Smoking Typewriters: The Sixties Underground Press and the Rise of Alternative Media in America (New York: Oxford University Press, 2011), pp. 9, 53, 58–59, 62, 72–73, 91, 97–99, 129, 151, 162, 164, 171, 210, 222, 241, photo gallery 9
- Mungo, Raymond, Famous Long Ago : My Life and Hard Times with Liberation News Service (Boston : Beacon Press, 1970), pp. 9, 116, 126.
- Pardun, Robert, Prairie Radical : A Journey Through the Sixties (Los Gatos, California : Shire Press. 2001), pp. 162, 227, 264.
- Peck, Abe, Uncovering the Sixties: The Life and Times of the Underground Press (New York: Pantheon Books, 1985), pp. 58, 59, 75–76, 148–49, 287.
- Romm, Ethel Grodzins, The Open Conspiracy: What America's angry Generation is Saying. (Harrisburg, PA, Stackpole Books, 1970), pp. 40, 157.
- Rosemont, Penelope, Dreams of Everyday Life: André Breton, Surrealism, Rebel Worker, sds & the Seven Cities of Cibola (Chicago: Charles H. Kerr, 2008), p. 202.
- Rossinow, Douglas C., Politics of Authenticity: Liberalism, Christianity, and the New Left in America (New York: Columbia University Press, 1998), pp. 176, 192, 194, 257–58, 260, 269.
- Sale, Kirkpatrick, SDS, (New York: Random House, 1973), pp. 392, 527.
- Stewart, Sean, Ed., On the Ground: An Illustrated Anecdotal History of the Sixties Underground Press in the U.S. (Oakland, CA: PM Press, 2011), pp. v-vii, 2, 18–22, 46–49, 89–90, 142–43, 179, 190–91, 196.
- Trodd, Zoe and Brian L. Johnson, Eds, Conflicts in American History: A Documentary Encyclopedia, Volume VII (New York: Facts on File, 2010), Chapter 11: "The New Left and the Underground Press" by John McMillian, pp. 239, 240, 242, 249, 250, 251, 252, 255, 257, Biography of Thorne Dreyer, 502.
- Wachsberger, Ken, Editor, Voices from the Underground : Insider Histories of the Vietnam Era Underground Press, Part 1 (East Lansing : Michigan State University Press, 2011), pp. 299, 300 (photo), 301, 302, 310, 313 (photo).
- Webster's Ninth New Collegiate Dictionary, Merriam Webster, Springfield, Mass (1983), Usage example for "liberate." (In multiple editions from 70s to present.)

=== Scholarly articles and academic papers ===
- Burr, Beverly, "History of Student Activism at the University of Texas at Austin (1960-1988)", Paper, University of Texas at Austin, Spring 1988, p. 20, 30
- Harvey, Marti G., "The Evolution of The Rag, An Analysis of the Social, Political and Technological Influences on the Birth of One Underground Newspaper in the 1960s," Masters Thesis, May 2010, University of Texas at Arlington, pp. vii, 11, 16, 22–23. 25, 27- 29, 36–42, 52–59, 62, 64–69, 72, 75–76.
- Holder, Matt, "A 'Molotov cocktail thrown at respectability and decency in our nation' : The Rhetoric, Revolutionary Zeal, and Myth-making of The Rag, 1966-1972", Honors Thesis, Southwestern University, 1996, Thesis Advisor, Jan C. Dawson, History.
- Irom, Bimbisar, "Genre and Political Transition: The Problematic of the Collective Novel in Norman Mailer’s The Armies of the Night," Genre (Duke University Press, 2011), p. 49
- Lewes, James, "The Underground Press in America (1964-1968): Outlining an Alternative, the Envisioning of an Underground," Journal of Communication Inquiry, October, 2000, pp. 379–400 (Iowa City, Iowa : Sage Publications, Inc.), pp. 387, 390, 392, 397, 400.
- Mailer, Norman, "The Battle of the Pentagon" Commentary, April 1968.
- McMillian, John, "Smoking Typewriters : The New Left’s Print Culture, 1962-1969," Doctoral Thesis, Columbia University, 2006, Dissertation Advisor, Provost Alan Brinkley
- McVicker, Jeanette, "One Nation, Under a Groove? Assessing the Legacy of the Sixties Underground Press," H-Net Reviews in the Humanities and Social Sciences, July 2011.
- Olan, Susan Torian, "The Rag: A Study in Underground Journalism." Masters Thesis, University of Texas at Austin, 1981
- Rossinow, Doug, "The New Left in the Counterculture: Hypotheses and Evidence," Radical History Review, 1997
- Scruggs, Melanie, "The Rise and Fall of The Rag: Problems for Alternative Media in a Radical Movement’s Decline." Plan II Honors Thesis, University of Texas at Austin, April 22, 2012; Supervising Professor, Robert Jensen, pp. 3, 5, 9, 10, 13, 14, 15, 17, 54, 60, 61.
- Slonecker, Blake, "Living the Movement: Liberation News Service, Montague Farm, and the New Left, 1967-1981." Dissertation, 2009, University of North Carolina Press at Chapel Hill, pp. 26, 36, 46, 105, 107, 110, 122,

=== Periodicals and online publications ===
- Brass, Kevin, "Media Watch:The Rag in the Modern World," Austin Chronicle (February 12, 2010)
- Boyle, Shane Patrick, "Zine Fest: When Houston Is Cool," The Rag Blog, June 2, 2009.
- Boyle, Shane Patrick, "Underground in H-Town: A Rich History of Alternative Media," The Rag Blog, May 19, 2010.
- Buchholz, Brad, "Thorne Dreyer back after 40 years: Radical returns to Austin..." The Austin American-Statesman, February 24, 2008. (Reposted on the Sixties website.)
- Burks, John, "The Underground Press: A Special Report," Rolling Stone, October 4, 1969
- Chriss, Nicolas C., "Officer to Play Down Marine Quiz Findings", Los Angeles Times, July 13, 1967, pp. 14–15.
- Christian, Gary, "Political parties: The campaign get-together taking on aura of best show in any town, thanks to Thorne Dreyer," Houston Post, April 30, 1978.
- Feldman, Claudia, "Houston's '60s night scene: Joplin sang here for $20 a night," Texas Magazine, Houston Chronicle, August 13, 1989.
- Holland, Dick, "UT’s Radicals", Austin American-Statesman, July 19, 1998, Page D-6.
- Kane, Karen, "Thorne Dreyer: Echoes of rebellion and random gunfire," from "The '60s: The young radicals, then and now," Texas Magazine, Houston Chronicle, Dec. 7, 1980, pp. 10–14.
- Leo, John, "Politics Now the Focus of Underground Press," New York Times, September 1, 1968,
- Mankad, Raj, "Space City! Underground," Cite: The Architecture & Design Review of Houston, Summer 2010, p. 18.
- Mankad, Raj, "Underground in H-Town," OffCite, May 21, 2010
- Martin, Debi "Sixties-era 'underground' newspapers live on in new media websites and blogs," Debi Martin website, July 26, 2011.
- McLemee, Scott, "Andy Warhol, Then and Now," Inside Higher Ed, Feb. 24, 2010.
- Raskin, Jonah, "John McMillian's 'Smoking Typewriters'," The Rag Blog, Feb. 21, 2011.
- Shivani, Anis, "Pressing for change: John McMillian's 'Smoking Typewriters' charts history of underground newspapers," Austin American-Statesman, Feb. 20, 2011.
- Siemssen, John, "Remembering Houston's First Alternative Newspaper," Houston's Other, Summer 1998
- Smith, Cheryl, "Everything Old is New Again: 'The Rag’ Returns to Austin," Austin Chronicle, Sept. 2, 2005.
- Seale, Shelley, "Election 2012: Keep up with Austin's top political bloggers," CultureMap Austin, June 2, 2012.
