= NLN =

NLN may refer to:

== Groups, organizations ==
- National Lampoon Inc (stock symbol NLN), a trademark licensing company for the brand "National Lampoon"
- National League for Nursing, for education and development in the United States
- National League of the North, Irish nationalist organisation in Northern Ireland
- National Learning Network, a large UK repository of online learning materials
- National Library of Nigeria (nln.gov.ng)
- Navis Logistics Network, U.S. packing and shipping company
- NeuLion (stock ticker: NLN), a television and streaming company; a subsidiary of Endeavor Streaming
- New Life Network, a TV programming distributor
- Next Left Notes, radical student periodical
- Nakladatelství Lidové noviny, s.r.o. (NLN), a Czech publishing house
- National Legitimist Party (NLN; Hungarian: Nemzeti Legitimista Néppárt), Hungarian political party of the 1930s

== Places ==
- New London Northern Railroad, New England, USA
- New Lane railway station (station code NLN), Burscough, West Lancashire, England, UK
- North Lincolnshire (ISO 3166-2:GB code NLN), Lincolnshire, England, UK
- Kneeland Airport (IATA airport code NLN), Humboldt County, California, USA

== Biology ==
- Natronolimnobius (Nln.), a genus of archaeabacteria
- nucleus linearis (Nln), a part of the ventral tegmental area in the midbrain
- Neurolysin, a human protein found in the mitochondria, and the NLN gene that produces it

== Other uses ==
- Mexicanero language (ISO 639 language code nln)
- Nelenite (IMA symbol Nln), a mineral
- nonbinary-liking-nonbinary (NLN), a LGBTQ slang
- No Licence Needed (NLN), a broadcasting status for television licensing in the United Kingdom
