= Margaret Webb Dreyer =

American painter

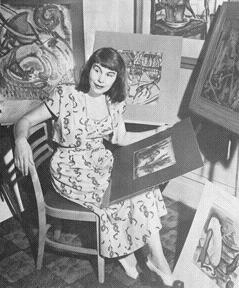
- Margaret Webb Dreyer, circa 1945
- Born: September 29, 1911; East St. Louis, Illinois, USA
- Died: December 17, 1976 (aged 65); Houston, Texas, USA
- Occupations: Painter, muralist, teacher, peace activist Owner, Dreyer Galleries
- Spouse(s): Martin Dreyer (m. 1941–1976), journalist
- Children: Thorne Webb Dreyer, journalist, activist

Margaret Webb Dreyer (29 September 1911 – December 17, 1976) was an American painter, muralist, mosaic artist, educator, gallery owner, and political activist who spent most of her career in Houston, Texas. Though she worked in a number of styles and media over the years, she was best known as an abstract expressionist painter. Her work won numerous awards in major juried shows and was exhibited widely in museums and galleries.

Dreyer is listed in the University of Texas at Austin's compilation of "women who have helped shape the history of Texas." and in 2013, Houstonia Magazine included her in a feature on "the most influential Houstonians of all time."

== Early life and education ==
Born in East St. Louis, Illinois, USA on 29 September 1911, Margaret Lee Webb was the eldest of two daughters and a son born to Elmer E. and Eula Richie Webb. She moved to Houston when she was 11. Her father, Illinois attorney Elmer Webb, came to Texas to run a string of 34 furniture stores with his brother. She studied fine arts at Westmoreland College in San Antonio, at the University of Texas School of Architecture in Austin, at the Museum of Fine Arts, Houston, and at the Instituto Allende in San Miguel de Allende, Mexico.

== Personal life ==
In 1941, she married writer Martin Dreyer and became Margaret Webb Dreyer. They were married for 35 years, until her death in 1976. Martin Dreyer was a fiction writer published in Esquire, Prairie Schooner, and the university-based "little magazines" of the 1940s, and whose work was "starred" in several editions of the Best Short Stories of the Year. He was a reporter, feature writer, and editor at the Houston Chronicle, serving for a number of years as the paper's travel editor. Martin Dreyer was a winner of the national Big Story award for "investigative journalism in the interest of justice," and his story was dramatized on network radio and television. The couple first met at a Houston literary party.

They had one son, Thorne Webb Dreyer, a journalist and political activist who was a pioneer in the Sixties underground press movement and a founding editor of The Rag in Austin and Space City! in Houston. He now lives in Austin, where he is a director of the New Journalism Project, edits The Rag Blog, and hosts a syndicated weekly radio show.

== Early career ==
Margaret Webb Dreyer began teaching art in the 1940s at Ripley House in Houston, where according to Candice Hughes, writing in Houston Breakthrough, "she also directed plays, taught dance, repaired the cabinetry, and even called a few square dances."[1] For ten years, from 1950 to 1960, she directed the fine arts program for the City of Houston's Parks and Recreation Department, and she taught art in various settings for much of her life. Along with a friend, Charlene Carpenter, she founded Murals, Inc. in 1955 — it was later renamed Mural Originals — commissioning leading local artists to produce original murals for homes, businesses, and building exteriors. Dreyer herself received several commissions to do large mosaic murals on building exteriors in Houston and San Antonio. Robert V. Haynes wrote that "Maggie Dreyer was largely responsible for encouraging an interest in murals in the Houston area."

She and her husband Martin ran Dreyer Galleries, an art gallery in Houston, from 1959 to 1975. Dreyer Galleries exhibited the work of leading Texas artists as well as artists from Mexico and South America, and also showed "museum-quality collections of pre-Columbian and African artifacts.

Maggie Dreyer became known for her support and mentoring of young local artists. Kendall Curlee wrote, "Dreyer had perhaps her greatest impact promoting the work of young artists in the Houston area. She ran Dreyer Galleries [during] a period when few Houston galleries exhibited local artists. She showed particular support for African-American and young female artists." Though the family was not wealthy, Dreyer frequently offered financial stipends to young artists, hired them to work at her gallery, and bought paintings from their shows, sometimes anonymously. There was often an artist living rent-free in a converted kitchen at the gallery, and a portrait artist from Uruguay lived there for months, adapting an old bathtub into a bed.

One of the young artists Dreyer encouraged was Charles Arthur Turner, now a prominent and widely exhibited artist and a long-time teacher at the Museum of Fine Arts, Houston's Glassell School of Art. Claudia Feldman wrote in the Houston Chronicle that "[Arthur] Turner was 19 and attending North Texas [State University] when he met Houston gallery owner Margaret Dreyer. He was clutching his portfolio. 'Darlin', come in, would you like a drink?' he remembers her greeting him. 'Three hours later, [he told Feldman], I had a show.'"

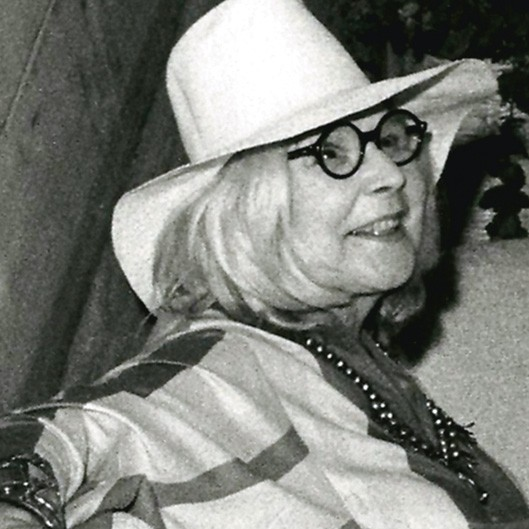
Margaret Webb Dreyer, circa 1975.

== Social activist ==
Ann Holmes wrote in the Houston Chronicle, "The Saturday night 'salons' at the gallery were an important part of Houston's emerging art scene." Dreyer Galleries also became a center for the city's literary, bohemian, and liberal political communities. Martin Dreyer wrote in The Houston Review, "Once Jane Fonda came [to Dreyer Galleries] to speak in support of antiwar GIs. She climbed up on a chair in the main gallery room and gave her pitch to assorted folks packed around the pre-Columbian sculptures and other obstacles d'art." Dreyer Galleries also hosted Ramparts publisher and editor Warren Hinckle, filmmakers Robert Altman and Lou Adler, Houston Mayor Fred Hofheinz, U.S. Congressman Mickey Leland, and other prominent figures in the arts and politics.

In the middle and late 1960s, Margaret and Martin Dreyer played a prominent and very public role in social and progressive political causes. The Houston Review's Robert V. Haynes wrote that, "In addition to being a champion of the arts in a city that valued materialism above cultural things, [Margaret Dreyer] was also an ardent supporter of liberal causes and a passionate critic of the Vietnam War."

The Dreyers' activities made them prime targets for an increasingly militant Ku Klux Klan group. Night riders threw red paint on the front of the gallery and shot a bullet through a glass pane in the gallery's front door. The bullet lodged in a mosaic wall in the entry. Maggie refused to repair the damage, considering it an emblem of honor. The Klan took credit for bombing and shooting up the offices of Space City!, the newspaper their son Thorne helped publish. Thorne later wrote, "Ironically, the work of the KKK scared nobody off, and if anything, the violent acts just seemed to strengthen the commitment of the peace activists and counterculture denizens--and made the radical community even more cohesive and purposeful. To say nothing of providing a lot of free publicity!"

Dreyer also lent her support to the women's movement, and her work was featured in several all-woman shows, including an International Women's Year exhibit at Houston's Contemporary Arts Museum in 1975.

== Artist ==
Dreyer's work was exhibited at all major Texas museums and in museums and galleries in the United States and Mexico. Year after year, she won best-of-show awards and purchase prizes in major juried exhibitions. She was featured in Houston Women: Invisible Threads in the Tapestry by Betty Trapp Chapman — a survey of the role played by important women in shaping the history of the city; The Dictionary of Texas Artists documented some of her awards in juried exhibitions; and she was listed in Artists USA, Artists International, the International Directory of the Arts, the Dictionary of International Biography, and in numerous editions of Who's Who in American Art.

Margaret Dreyer was one of Houston's earliest and most accomplished watercolorists — often working in the difficult medium of wet watercolor — in a style that was once compared to that of John Marin. She became one of the city's first major abstract expressionists, working in acrylics and oils, with her work showing the influence of African and Latin American cultures.

Art writer Susie Kalil, in a history of the Houston art scene, pointed to the "lush, tropical paintings of Margaret Webb Dreyer" as an important influence. In a special feature on Maggie, the editors of Houston Scene wrote: "Most of her compositions give a cheerful feeling, as if she looks at the world through a prism of flashing lights. In many works, blotches of color are applied in mosaic-like patterns worked into the chiaroscuro." Candice Hughes wrote, "She did figurative abstractions bursting with life and used the techniques of impasto and glazing with a skillful hand." Kendall Curlee wrote in The Handbook of Texas Online, "Throughout her career, Margaret Dreyer experimented with such styles as Cubism, Surrealism, and Abstract Expressionism; her work was characterized by bold strokes and rich colors and textures. Her best-known series include "Blueprint for Survival," a group of abstract works representing the artist's feelings about the Vietnam War, and "Maggie's Songs," a series of large, nonobjective stained paintings on raw canvas that she completed shortly before her death."

The paintings in her last series, "Maggie's Songs," were created while she was dying of cancer. Exhibited posthumously at the Contemporary Arts Museum of Houston, they were large acrylic stain pieces on unbleached, unsized linen. About these works, the Houston Chronicle's Ann Holmes wrote: "Maggie's last songs were lyrical, jeweled, maultidimensional, complex, allusive... The rounded organic shapes and the surface strokes may be Kandinsky-reminiscent; the organization of the vertical rectangles into two or three pane sections may go back to Rothko. But the textures and the colors — fuchsias, confetti greens, orange and yellow of these separate works are perfectly, clearly, Margaret Webb Dreyer getting it all together with her very own kind of inquiry and sophistication."

David Parsons of Rice University said, "In her last works she seemed to have gained a fresh impetus and focus to her work that came from a close attention to what was going on around her and within her. It was as though Maggie was taking her cues from the shapes of the cell, the basic unit of life, and also what was attacking her." Many believed that Margaret Webb Dreyer did her finest work while her cancer was in its final stages. Two years later, in 1979, 60 paintings representing four decades of her art were exhibited in "Maggie: A Retrospective" at the University of St. Thomas Art Gallery in Houston.

== Death and legacy ==
Dreyer died of cancer on December 17, 1976, at the age of 65. Her final series of paintings was shown in a posthumous exhibition at the Contemporary Arts Museum in Houston from April 16 to May 1, 1977, and in 1979 a retrospective of her work was held at the University of St. Thomas in Houston. Her personal papers are in the Archives of American Art in the Smithsonian Institution. Dreyer's biography is featured in the Texas State Historical Society's Handbook of Texas Online, she is included in the University of Texas at Austin's online "Gallery of Great Texas Women," and she was included in Who Was Who in American Art, 1564–1975. On December 20, 1976, Margaret Webb Dreyer was eulogized by 200 friends at the Rothko Chapel in Houston, where then Houston Mayor Fred Hofheinz said of her: "There are some people who by only living their lives enrich the lives of everyone around them." Don Sanders sang at the ceremony.

Dreyer was also a flamboyant and widely admired personality and a leading light of the art scene long before Houston became a major art center. Along with her husband Martin and son Thorne, she was the center of an extensive art and literary community and was active in liberal politics and the movement against the War in Vietnam. Sandra J. Levy, writing in the Archives of American Art Journal, said that Dreyer "was a moving force in Houston from the 1940s to the 1970s." Houston Chronicle Fine Arts Editor Ann Holmes wrote, "She was a leader whose impact was both personal and artistic." And, as her husband Martin later said, "She had a charisma that drew diverse people together, from scruffy artists to federal judges, from social 'items' to good-ol'-boys... Her warmth and openness made people feel welcome and important."

In a 2013 feature on "the most influential Houstonians of all time," Houstonia Magazine wrote, "People loved Margaret Webb Dreyer's …mid-century Saturday night salons …where today's celebrated art scene may well have been born, and the guest list glittered with anti-Vietnam activists (Jane Fonda) and renegade filmmakers (Robert Altman)."

The Houston Chronicle's Ann Holmes said in an obituary, "She was a tall woman from whom the grand scale was in order. Her penetrating, dark eyes glowed as she spoke with energy and dramatic gesture... she shone in Houston's emerging art scene when it took a lot more courage to be unconventional..." And Houston Post art writer Mimi Crossley said, "Maggie's absolute freedom, her hospitality, big floppy hats, and committed heart put the art scene in Houston on the side of human rights and general soul. To a large extent, she made it an art-for-artist's scene and set the stage for those of us who walk on it now."

== Books and periodicals ==
- Hastings, Peter Falk, ed, Who Was Who in American Art: 400 Years of Artists in America, 1564–1975 (3 volumes) (1999).
- Rose, Barbara and Susie Kalil, Fresh Paint: The Houston School: The Museum of Fine Arts Houston (Texas Monthly Press, 1985).
- Chapman, Betty Trapp, Houston Women: Invisible Threads in the Tapestry, pp. 116–7, 136.
- Brutyan, Cheryl A., In Our Time: Houston's Contemporary Arts Museum, 1945–1982 (1982).
- Grauer, Paula and Michael Grauer, Dictionary of Texas Artists (1999)
- Dunbier, Lonnie Pearson, The Artists Bluebook : 34,000 North American Artists to March 2005.
- Who's Who in American Art (Jacques Cattell Press), 11th–15th editions.
- Kay, Ernest, ed, Dictionary of International Biography, multiple editions.
- Lightman, Paul, Artists/USA, multiple editions.
- Hughes, Candice, "Tribute to Maggie," Houston Breakthrough, March 1977.
- Levy, Sandra J., "Texas Project," Archives of American Art Journal (Vol. 2, No. 4, 1982).
- Editors, "Artist of the Month: Margaret Webb Dreyer," Houston Scene, Vol. 4, No. 1, March 1976.
- Chapman, Betty T., Houston Heritage: Aspiring Artists Painted First Picture of Future Cultural Center, Houston Business Journal, Sept. 1, 2006.
- Margaret Webb Dreyer, artist, gallery owner, dies at age 59 (sic, age incorrect), Dec. 18, 1976 Houston Chronicle.
- Holmes, Ann, "Satisfaction in Maggie's last five songs," Houston Chronicle, April 28, 1977.
- Holmes, Ann, "Margaret Dreyer Still Imaginative, Vital Artist," Houston Chronicle.
