= Ronnie Dugger =

American progressive journalist (1930–2025)

Ronald Edward Dugger (April 16, 1930 – May 27, 2025) was an American progressive journalist.

== Life and career ==
Dugger was born in Chicago, Illinois, on April 16, 1930. He attended the University of Texas and was editor of The Daily Texan 1950–1951. He was the founding editor of The Texas Observer from 1954 to 1961. Later he served as the Observer's publisher, spending more than 40 years with the political news magazine.

Dugger published hundreds of articles in Harper's Magazine, The Nation, The New Yorker, The Atlantic Monthly, The Progressive and other periodicals.

In 2011 Dugger won the George Polk Award in recognition of his lifelong achievements in journalism. The following year he was dubbed the "godfather of progressive journalism in Texas" in an in-depth feature published in the Austin American-Statesman by Brad Buchholz.

=== Political involvement ===
In 1952, Dugger, along with Ralph Yarborough, John Henry Faulk, and others campaigned against Governor Allan Shivers, a Democrat who supported the Republican Party presidential candidate, Dwight Eisenhower. Shivers accused Dugger and his friends of being communists. Dugger criticized Lyndon B. Johnson and his shift away from the left of the Democratic Party when he came under the influence of Herman Brown and George R. Brown. "The alliance (of Brown & Root and Johnson) became common knowledge as his political identity changed from left to right before everyone's eyes", Dugger said.

In 1996, Ronnie Dugger also co-founded The Alliance for Democracy, a national grassroots populist organization.

In 2000, Dugger sought the Green Party's nomination for the U.S. Senate in New York.

Dugger used his 2011 George Polk Award acceptance speech to question the nuclear policy of mutually assured destruction, saying, "Why are nuclear weapons called weapons of mass destruction when morally they are weapons of mass murder?" This continued his long vocal concern about nuclear weapons going back to his questioning of LBJ about how many would be killed in a nuclear war up to expressing doubts when President Obama calls for a nuclear-free world.

=== The Texas Observer ===
Dugger and his friends decided to build The Texas Observer into an independent liberal weekly paper. He said "I sought to practice journalism according to three basic standards, accuracy, fairness instead of 'objectivity,' and moral seriousness." He went on to mentor and influence progressive Texas journalists Willie Morris, Molly Ivins, Billy Lee Brammer, Lawrence Goodwyn, Kaye Northcott, and Jim Hightower.

=== Teaching career ===
Dugger taught at the University of Virginia, Hampshire College, and the University of Illinois. He also held fellowships from the National Endowment for the Humanities, the Rockefeller Foundation, and the Woodrow Wilson International Center for Scholars.

=== Later life and death ===
Dugger died of complications from dementia in Austin, Texas, on May 27, 2025, at the age of 95.

== Selected works ==
- Dark Star, Hiroshima Reconsidered (World, 1967)
- Our Invaded Universities (W.W. Norton, 1973)
- The Politician: The Life and Times of Lyndon Johnson (W.W. Norton, 1982)
- On Reagan (McGraw Hill, 1983),
- Edited Three Men in Texas: Bedichek, Webb, and Dobie for UT Press
