= Space City (newspaper) =

Space City!
- Cover of the October 28, 1971, issue. Artwork by Kerry Fitzgerald (Kerry Awn).
- Type: Biweekly newspaper
- Format: Tabloid
- Owner: Space City News Collective
- Editor: Founding Editorial Collective: Thorne Dreyer, Victoria Smith, Sue Mithun Duncan, Cam Duncan, Dennis Fitzgerald, and Judy Gitlin Fitzgerald
- Founded: 1969
- Ceased publication: 1972
- Headquarters: Houston, Texas
- Circulation: 10,000
- Price: $0.25

Space City! was an underground newspaper published in Houston, Texas from June 5, 1969 to August 3, 1972. The founders were Students for a Democratic Society veterans and former members of the staff of the Austin, Texas, underground newspaper, The Rag, one of the earliest and most influential of the Sixties underground papers. The original editorial collective was composed of Thorne Dreyer, who had been the founding "funnel" of The Rag in 1966; Victoria Smith, a former reporter for the St. Paul Dispatch; community organizers Cam Duncan and Sue Mithun Duncan; and radical journalists Dennis Fitzgerald and Judy Gitlin Fitzgerald.

Dreyer, a Houston native, and Smith had worked together at Liberation News Service (LNS) in New York before coming to Houston to help found Space City!. Other staffers included Bill Narum as Art Director, cartoonist Kerry Fitzgerald (later known as Kerry Awn), and noted music writers and musicologists Tary Owens and John Lomax III.

The first twelve issues of the paper were published under the name Space City News, but, starting with issue No. 13 (Jan. 17, 1970), the name was changed to Space City! (with the exclamation point as a graphical design flourish) when it was discovered that another publication (a UFO newsletter) was already using the name.

Space City! was one of the most important of the second generation of underground papers—developing a reputation for its advocacy journalism, power structure research, and arts coverage. In a 1976 book about modern Texas folklore, Hermes Nye called Space City! "a well written, sprightly sheet... [that] also had an eye for vivid, telling graphics and poetry of a high level." Historian Laurence Leamer wrote about Space City!: "There is a solid intelligence to the reviews and cultural articles... It is a radical journalism grounded in fact... resolved and balanced in content and full of common purpose..."

Thorne Dreyer, speaking at Zine Fest Houston in June 2009, said that Space City! served as a center for Houston's countercultural community, spinning off a number of alternative institutions including several high school underground newspapers, a food coop, a drug crisis center, and a community-run rock venue called Of Our Own. “The main thing about Houston was that it was all spread out... What Space City! did was to help to identify all these pockets of progressive politics and kindred spirits, and pull them together into a cohesive...network."

== Change of focus ==
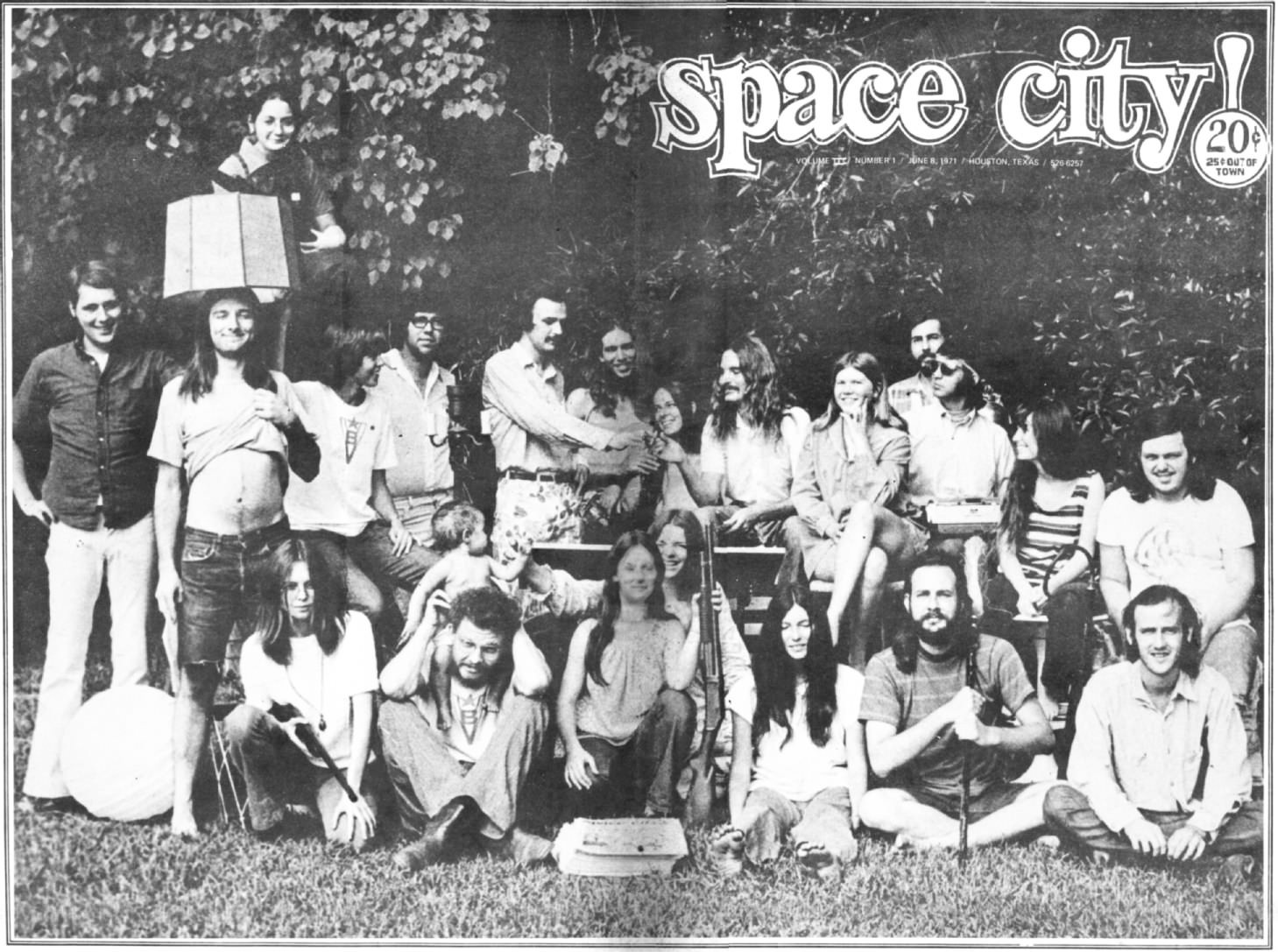
Cover of Space City!, Houston, Texas, Vol. 3, No. 1, June 8, 1971, with photo of the paper's staff.

Initially biweekly, the paper went on hiatus for two months starting in February 1971 and then, with $3000 in the bank which they had accumulated through a series of fundraisers, they resumed publishing in April 1971 as a weekly. After the hiatus the paper changed its focus and became more mainstream, shifting its target audience from dope-smoking revolutionary youth to the older "liberal intelligentsia" who listened to the local Pacifica Radio affiliate, KPFT, where other Rag alumni were working.

At this time Space City! began to pay more attention to local news and electoral politics, which it had previously disdained, and added such traditional newspaper appurtenances as beat reporters and a city desk.

Space City! was published by a theoretically leaderless leftist collective, and for the first 18 months of its existence it pushed an agitprop antiwar/radical political message, leavening the politics with lively graphics and countercultural arts coverage. Sales, which were mostly by casual street vendors, averaged around 10,000 copies, both before and after the paper went weekly in 1971.

In 1972 a staff split, led by former business manager Bill McElrath who believed the paper was losing its revolutionary zeal, resulted in the formation of a rival publication, Mockingbird, publishing its first issue in April 1972. Mockingbird itself suffered a split when several staffers subsequently left to form a third alternative paper, Abraxas.

During the three years of the paper's existence, the offices of Space City! were attacked several times in drive-by shootings, car bombings, and one pipe-bombing, in which no one, fortunately, was seriously injured. Some of the papers' advertisers also faced threats and occasional violence from nightriders, and the nearby Dreyer Galleries, an art gallery owned by Thorne Dreyer's mother, noted artist Margaret Webb Dreyer, had bullets shot through its front door and yellow paint thrown on its walls.

Raj Mankad wrote at OffCite that an arrow with a note saying, “The Knights of the Ku Klux Klan is watching you,” was shot into the Space City! office. "The incident," Mankad said, "was one among many threats and acts of violence against progressive and radical institutions in Houston." The perpetrators were never identified but were suspected by some to be the same vigilantes, possibly KKK members, who bombed Pacifica radio station KPFT twice in 1970. In his book, Campaign Against the Underground Press, Geoffrey Rips wrote that "the Houston Police Department conducted only lax, inconclusive investigations of the bombings and shootings."

Infighting among the collective, staff burnout, financial difficulties, and the general decline of the underground press which paralleled the winding down of the Vietnam War led to the paper's demise. The final issue was Vol. 4, No. 9 (August 3, 1972).

In 2010, Space City! was featured in an exhibition called "Underground in H-Town" at Houston's Museum of Printing History, which highlighted "the importance of minority and alternative publications in the construct of local history."

== See also ==
- List of underground newspapers of the 1960s counterculture

== Resources and external links ==
- Gallery of Space City! covers by Bill Narum, 1960s Texas Music.
- Space City! cover, Wisconsin Historical Society.
- Feldman, Claudia, "Houston's '60s night scene: Joplin sang here for $20 a night," Texas Magazine, Houston Chronicle, August 13, 1989.
- Kane, Karen, "Thorne Dreyer: Echoes of rebellion and random gunfire," from "The '60s: The young radicals, then and now," Texas Magazine, Houston Chronicle, Dec. 7, 1980, pp. 10–14.
- Siemssen, John, "Remembering Houston's First Alternative Newspaper," Houston's Other, Summer 1998
- Leamer, Laurence, The Paper Revolutionaries : The Rise of the Underground Press (New York : Simon and Schuster, 1972).
- McMillian, John, Smoking Typewriters: The Sixties Underground Press and the Rise of Alternative Media in America (New York: Oxford University Press, 2011).
- Peck, Abe, Uncovering the Sixties: The Life and Times of the Underground Press (New York: Pantheon Books, 1985).
- Rossinow, Doug, The Politics of Authenticity: Liberalism, Christianity, and the New Left in America, Columbia University Press (1998).
- Stewart, Sean, Ed., On the Ground: An Illustrated Anecdotal History of the Sixties Underground Press in the U.S. (Oakland, CA: PM Press, 2011), pp. v-vii, 2, 18-22, 46-49, 89-90, 142-43, 179, 190-91, 196.
- Trodd, Zoe and Brian L. Johnson, Eds, Conflicts in American History: A Documentary Encyclopedia, Volume VII (New York: Facts on File, 2010), Chapter 11: "The New Left and the Underground Press" by John McMillian, Biography of Thorne Dreyer, 502.
- Wachsberger, Ken, Editor, Voices from the Underground : Insider Histories of the Vietnam Era Underground Press, Part 1 (East Lansing : Michigan State University Press, 2011).
- Digitized set of Space City! at the Internet Archive.

== Interviews ==
- Oral history interview with Thorne Dreyer on July 15, 1976 from Metropolitan Archives of the Houston Public Library. Audio tape (1 hr, 23 min.) and transcript.
- Thorne Dreyer interviewed by Jeff Farias, April 29, 2010 (25 min.).
- Thorne Dreyer and Sherwood Bishop discuss underground newspaper Space City! and Sixties Houston at Zine Fest Houston 2009.
