= Wade Goodwyn =

American journalist (1960–2023)

- Born: January 12, 1960; Austin, Texas, U.S
- Died: June 8, 2023 (aged 63); Dallas, Texas, U.S.
- Education: University of Texas
- Occupation: Journalist
- Spouse: Sharon Sandell Goodwyn
- Children: 2
- Father: Lawrence Goodwyn

Wade William Goodwyn (January 12, 1960 – June 8, 2023) was an American journalist who was the national desk correspondent for National Public Radio. Goodwyn began his career in radio as a freelancer and began working for NPR in 1991. His coverage focused on news in and around Texas.

== Early career ==
Goodwyn was the son of historian Lawrence Goodwyn, a journalist, liberal activist, and history professor at Duke University. Wade Goodwyn attended the University of Texas, graduating with a degree in history. His first career was as a political campaign staffer for Lloyd Doggett and Ralph Nader. He spent time in New York City as a political organizer, and his time listening to WNYC inspired him to pursue a career in radio in general, and with NPR in particular.

== Broadcasting ==
In 1991, Goodwyn met with All Things Considered host Robert Siegel, who connected him with the NPR hiring office. Without prior experience in radio or journalism, Goodwyn began as a freelancer, learning radio techniques from his first editor, Judith Doherty. To make his career transition financially possible, he moved back to Texas.

In 1993, Goodwyn went to Waco, Texas, to add to National Desk correspondent John Burnett's coverage of the 1993 Branch Davidian siege. It became a major national story, and Goodwyn managed the first interview of a former Branch Davidian and other scoops which led to his being hired by NPR as a staff correspondent.

Goodwyn's stories were frequently included in NPR programs like All Things Considered and Morning Edition, covering Texas, the surrounding states, and other stories of national interest. Some of the noteworthy stories he covered were major hurricanes, the Oklahoma City bombing, the murders of Chris Kyle and Chad Littlefield, the Boy Scouts sexual abuse case, and the first case of ebola in the United States.

Goodwyn was known for his baritone voice, which he said deepened with age. NPR CEO John Lansing called him "one of NPR's iconic voices."

Goodwyn left NPR on April 28, 2023.

== Personal life and death ==
Goodwyn was married with two daughters and worked out of a home studio in Dallas, Texas.

Goodwyn died from cancer on June 8, 2023, at the age of 63.
