= The Rag =

Underground newspaper

- The Rag covers
- Type: Underground
- Format: Tabloid
- Owner(s): Staff-owned and -published
- Editor: (Founding) Thorne Dreyer and Carol Neiman
- Founded: October 10, 1966
- Ceased publication: 1977
- Headquarters: Austin, Texas
- Sister newspapers: Member: Underground Press Syndicate (UPS); Liberation News Service (LNS)
- ISSN: 0033-8621
- OCLC number: 1586244
- Free online archives: voices.revealdigital.org

The Rag was an underground newspaper published in Austin, Texas from 1966–1977. The weekly paper covered political and cultural topics that the conventional press ignored, such as the growing antiwar movement, the sexual revolution, gay liberation, and drug culture. It encouraged these political constituencies and countercultural communities to coalesce into a significant political force in Austin. As the sixth member of the Underground Press Syndicate and the first underground paper in the South, The Rag helped shape a flourishing national underground press.

According to historian and publisher Paul Buhle, The Rag was "one of the first, the most long-lasting and most influential" of the Sixties underground papers. In his 1972 book, The Paper Revolutionaries, Laurence Leamer called The Rag "one of the few legendary undergrounds."

== Early history ==
The Rag first hit the streets in Austin on October 10, 1966. Thorne Dreyer and Carol Neiman were the original editors of the paper. (They were called "funnels" in keeping with the paper's democratic structure.) The Rag was closely associated with SDS and played a major role in bringing together the anarchist-leaning New Lefties and Austin's rich countercultural community, helping to merge them into a major political force.

Former staffer Alice Embree recalls that "The Rag covered what was not covered by the 'straight' press. The writers participated in the political and cultural uprising and also wrote about it. And they told you where to get a chicken dinner for 35 cents." The Rag featured the writing of major New Left figures like Gary Thiher, Jeff Shero, Robert Pardun, and Greg Calvert. It covered the Austin rock scene which was one of the birthplaces of the psychedelic music phenomenon.

According to John McMillian, author of the 2011 book Smoking Typewriters, The Rag "was a spirited, quirky, and humorous paper, whose founders pushed the New Left's political agenda even as they embraced the counterculture's zeal for rock music, psychedelics, and personal liberation," and, according to historian Douglas Rossinow, the paper was "enormously important to local activists."

The Rag would become virtually indistinguishable from the community it served, helping to coalesce and mobilize the movement in Austin, both as a news source and as a direct agent of change. Thorne Dreyer and Victoria Smith wrote at Liberation News Service in 1969 that "the people who put The Rag together were the same people who conceived demonstrations and love-ins, who were among the leaders of confrontations with local authorities, and who were at the forefront of local cultural gatherings."

== Featured content ==
The Rag featured news coverage and commentary on the War in Vietnam and the movement opposing it, the Civil Rights Movement, the student freedom movement, the development of the New Left and SDS, the psychedelic rock and folk music scenes, and the sixties counterculture movement, of which Austin was a major outpost. It also carried national and world news and opinion from Liberation News Service (LNS) and from other underground newspapers around the country.

The Fabulous Furry Freak Brothers, Gilbert Shelton's iconic sixties comic strip, was born in The Rag and, thanks in part to the Underground Press Syndicate, was republished in underground papers and comic books all over the world. Artist Jim Franklin—whose surrealist armadillos helped to place the ugly little armored critters right up there with the longhorn as a symbol of Texas—designed many of the paper's covers, as did noted cartoonist and artist Kerry Awn. God Nose, a comic strip by Jack Jackson, ran in The Rag. Alan Pogue, now a documentary photographer, was a staff photographer for eight years.

Over its lifespan, the paper evolved with the times, for a while becoming one of the strongest voices of the women's liberation movement and later focusing on local politics, covering Austin city government, neighborhood protests, and the labor movement. As Glenn Scott recalls about the later Rag, one "could not have imagined a more democratic process than a Rag copy meeting. An all-volunteer group of self-taught editors and copy writers debated the sexism and violence in pornography, the corporate influence in utility policies, and the CIA's involvement in Chile. And how much space went to the Free Clinic benefit and the Freak Brothers."

Many of the underground newspapers met with establishment opposition, harassment, and even legal action. In Austin, the regents at the University of Texas sued The Rag to prevent circulation on campus. David Richards, attorney for the American Civil Liberties Union, successfully defended The Rag's First Amendment rights before the U.S. Supreme Court.

== Impact on alternative media ==
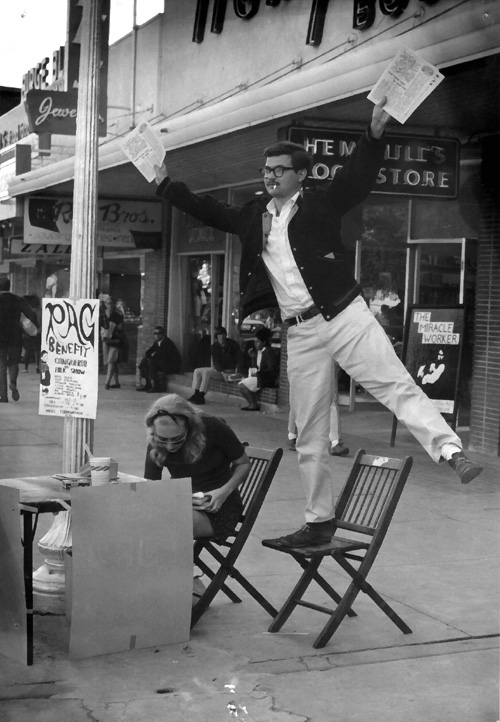
George Vizard selling The Rag in Austin (1966)

The Rag was one of the most influential of the early underground papers and, according to historian John McMillian, it served as a model for many papers that followed. The Rag was credited with being the first underground paper to successfully combine the radical politics of the New Left with the spirit of the burgeoning alternative culture. Abe Peck, editor of the Chicago Seed and author of Uncovering the Sixties: The Life and Times of the Underground Press, wrote that "The Rag was the first independent undergrounder to represent... the participatory democracy, community organizing and synthesis of politics and culture that the New Left of the mid-sixties was trying to develop." The Austin Chronicle's Kevin Brass called the paper "a firebrand little troublemaker" that was "a seminal influence in the national underground press movement."

Many of the forces behind the founding of The Rag later played major roles in developing other alternative media. Thorne Dreyer worked with Liberation News Service and, along with The Rag's Dennis and Judy Fitzgerald, started Space City News (later Space City!) in Houston. Carol Neiman later edited New Left Notes, the national SDS newspaper. Dreyer, Gary Thiher, and Jeff Shero (later known as Jeff Nightbyrd) worked with KPFT-FM, the Pacifica radio station in Houston. Shero started Rat in New York, where he was joined by Alice Embree and Gary Thiher, and later published the alternative Austin Sun.

The Rag held a reunion on September 1–4, 2005, which was attended by over 70 former staff members who came in from all over the United States for Rag art and photography exhibits, a rousing retro-rock concert, and a series of group discussions. Many former staffers had not been in touch for 35-40 years. The reunion resulted in a renewed alliance among many of the ex-Ragstaffers and birthed a group of websites including The Rag Blog, The Rag archives site, which includes full scans of the early issues, a Rag Reunion site, and a Rag Authors' Page. Several Rag vets have reunited in Austin and are once more involved in political activism through the Movement for a Democratic Society (MDS/Austin), associated with the newly revived SDS.

== The Rag Blog ==
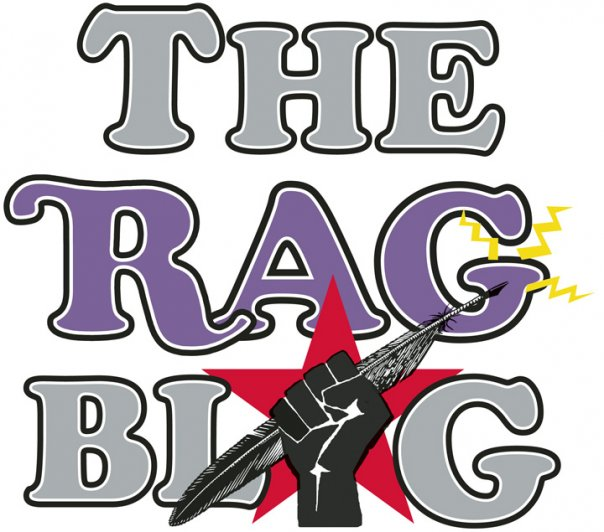

The Rag Blog is an Internet news magazine with roots in the Sixties underground press and New Left. A digital rebirth of Austin, Texas' influential underground paper, The Rag, The Rag Blog features commentary on news, politics, and cultural affairs, and many of its contributors are long-time alternative journalists and veterans of Sixties underground journalism.

Founded in 2006 by Richard D. Jehn, The Rag Blog is edited by Thorne Webb Dreyer and is published by the New Journalism Project, a Texas 501(c)(3) nonprofit corporation. It is affiliated with Rag Radio, a weekly public affairs program produced in the studios of KOOP 91.7-FM, a cooperatively run community radio station in Austin.

Editor Dreyer was a pioneering Sixties underground journalist who was a founding editor of two of the most important of the era's underground newspapers – The Rag in Austin, Texas, and Space City! in Houston, and who also served on the editorial collective of Liberation News Service in New York and managed KPFT, the Pacifica radio station in Houston.

In a June 2012 feature article on Austin's leading political bloggers, Culture Map Austin put Thorne Dreyer and The Rag Blog at the top of its list.

The Rag Blog features commentary on contemporary politics and culture and has been an original internet source on subjects like Occupy Wall Street, the environmental and sustainability movements, and other issues of social activism, and also provides original reporting from Latin America, Europe, and the Middle East. The Rag Blog has featured the work of over 150 bloggers, many of whom are veterans of the original Rag and the Sixties underground press and New Left.

The editorial core group includes editor Thorne Dreyer, who was the original "Funnel" of The Rag in 1966; Sarito Carol Neiman, who co-edited The Rag and later was a major figure in SDS and editor of New Left Notes; former Rag staffers Mariann Wizard and Alice Embree (who also worked with New York's Rat and was active in the Women's liberation movement); filmmaker and writer William Michael Hanks; and art director James Retherford, who edited The Spectator, a Sixties underground paper published in Bloomington, Indiana, and was active with the Yippies.

Among The Rag Blog's regular contributors are prominent alternative journalists and activists like Paul Krassner, Robert Jensen, Mike Davis, Harvey Wasserman, Jonah Raskin, Judy Gumbo Albert, Tom Hayden, Carl Davidson, David P. Hamilton, and Harry Targ, and The Rag Blog served as a primary outlet for the late poet/journalist John Ross' reporting from Mexico. Other contributors include Roger Baker on economics and transportation, Bruce Melton on climate change and the environment, and retired physician Dr. Stephen R. Keister on health care reform, plus Texas bloggers Ted McLaughlin and Lamar W. Hankins.

In January 2010 The Rag Blog broke a story by novelist Marc Estrin titled "Got Fascism? Obama Advisor Promotes 'Cognitive Infiltration'" that "stirred up an Internet storm". The article revealed a previously unreported and highly controversial strategy for fighting dissension and "extremism" that had originated with Obama friend and appointee Cass Sunstein, writing in a 2008 scholarly journal. The story "went viral," and was then covered by Raw Story, Salon.com, Common Dreams, OpEd News, Daily Kos, and Information Clearing House.

The Rag Blog has also been a target of right wing bloggers and conspiracists, including Trevor Loudon, Cliff Kincaid, and WorldNetDaily, who characterize The Rag Blog as "radical leftists" and as a media arm of "former Weatherman terrorists," and suggest that it is connected to President Obama through the groups Progressives for Obama and Movement for a Democratic Society (MDS). The right wing KeyWiki has an article on The Rag Blog, with individual links to more than 50 of its contributors.

== Rag Radio ==
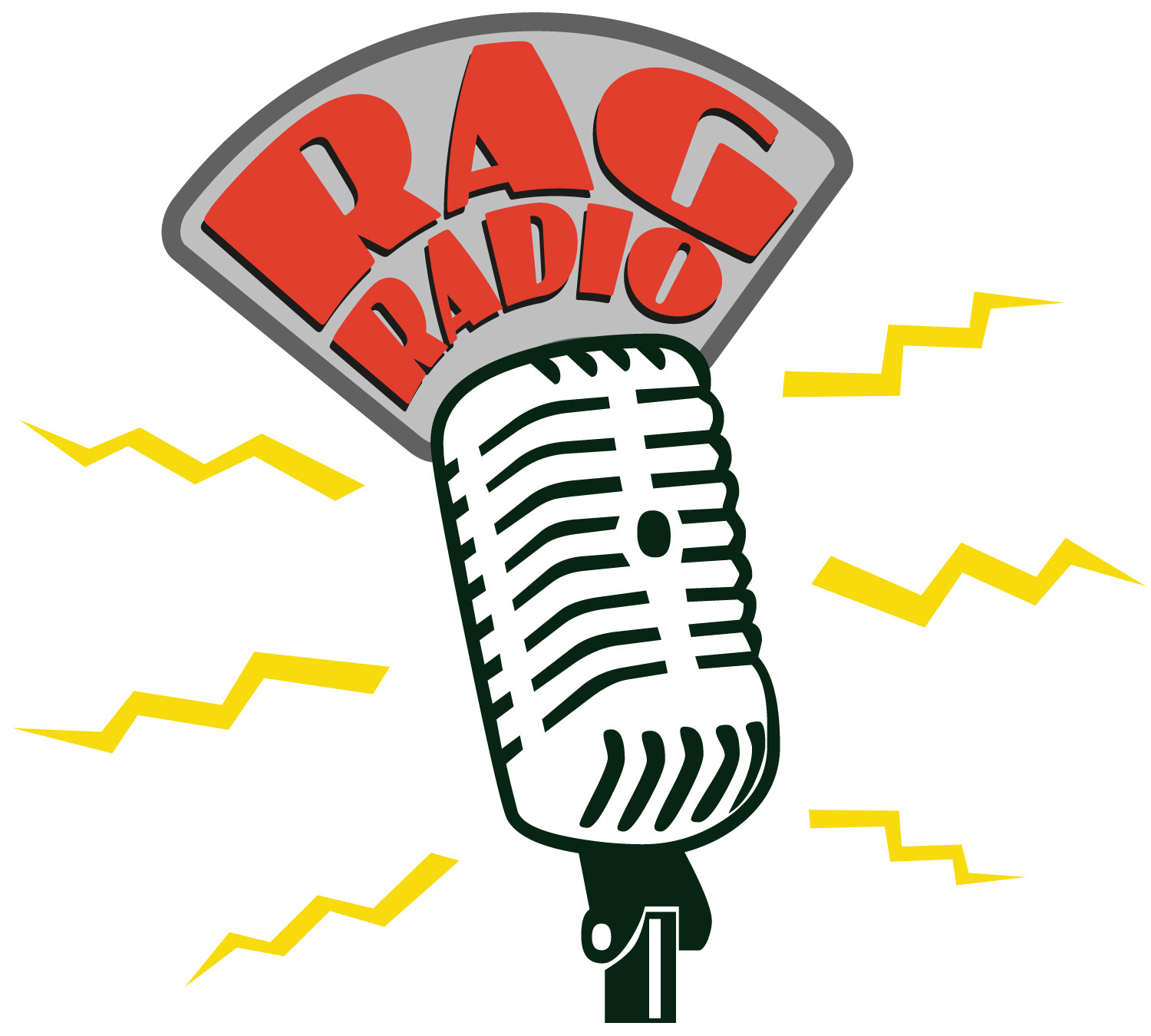

Rag Radio is a weekly public affairs program hosted and produced by Rag Blog editor Thorne Dreyer that features hour-long in-depth interviews with prominent figures in politics and the arts. Rag Radio's engineer and co-producer is Tracey Schulz. The show is broadcast every Friday from 2-3 p.m. (Central) on KOOP 91-7 FM, an all-volunteer cooperatively run community radio station in Austin, and is rebroadcast every Sunday at 10 a.m. (Eastern) on WFTE, 90.3-FM in Mt. Cobb, PA, and 105.7-FM in Scranton, PA. Rag Radio is also streamed live, with a widespread Internet following, and all episodes are posted as podcasts at the Internet Archive.

== Revival ==
Nearly fifty years after the underground newspaper ceased publication, The Rag was revived by two University of Texas students, co-editors-in-chief Kira Small and Ava Hosseini, with its first new issue published in September 2025. Unaffiliated with the university, the institutionally and financially independent newspaper was resurrected amidst the backdrop of free speech restrictions, including the Campus Protection Act and the Compact for Academic Excellence in Higher Education. According to the editors, the paper confronts big tech, politics, and culture with a sense of irony and humor. The Rag's new staff met with some who worked on the original newspaper, including Alice Umbree and Thorne Dreyer who said, "those of us who founded and produced The Rag in its earlier incarnation are honored that a new generation has been inspired to bring the publication back to life".

== See also ==
- List of underground newspapers of the 1960s counterculture

== Bibliography ==
- Smith, Cheryl, "Everything Old is New Again: 'The Rag’ Returns to Austin," Austin Chronicle, Sept. 2, 2005.
- Brass, Kevin,“Media Watch: The Rag in the Modern World,” Austin Chronicle (Feb. 12, 2010).
- Baunstein, Peter and Michael William Doyle (2002), Imagine Nation : the American Counterculture of the 1960s and '70s, Routledge, pp. 107, 112, 122-124, 309, 318, 323-324.
- Janes, Daryl, editor (1992), No Apologies : Texas Radicals Celebrate the '60s, Eakin Press; "The Community and The Rag," by Danny N. Schweers, pp. 211–236
- Leamer, Laurence (1972), The Paper Revolutionaries : The Rise of the Underground Press, Simon and Schuster, pp. 60–65, 73, 104, 117, 131.
- Peck, Abe (1985), Uncovering the Sixties : The Life and Times of the Underground Press, Pantheon, pp. 58–59, 93, 136, 142, 208, 214.
- Richards, David, Once Upon a Time in Texas: A Liberal in the Lone Star State (Austin, Texas: University of Texas Press, 2002), Ch. 13: "Frank Erwin and UT Take on the Rag," pp. 125–143.
- Trodd, Zoe and Brian L. Johnson, editors, Conflicts in American History : A Documentary Encyclopedia, Volume VII, Facts on File (2010), pp. 239, 252, 256, 502; Document, p. 239.
- McMillian, John, Smoking Typewriters: The Sixties Underground Press and the Rise of Alternative Media in America (New York: Oxford University Press, 2011), pp. xiii, 31. 37. 53-54, 58-65, 72-73, 75-77, 97, 126, 129, 133, 232, photo gallery 2.
- Stewart, Sean, Editor, On the Ground: An Illustrated Anecdotal History of the Sixties Underground Press in the U.S. (Oakland, CA: PM Press, 2011), pp. xii, 4, 19-24, 46-49, 62, 89-90-142-144, 179, 180-181, 190, 191, 193,196; Images, pp. 4, 49, 90.
- Davis, Steven L., Texas Literary Outlaws : Six Writers in the Sixties and Beyond (Fort Worth : TCU Press, 2004), pp. 207–8, 229, 236-7, 475-6, 499.
- McMillian, John, Smoking Typewriters : The New Left’s Print Culture, 1962-1969, Doctoral Thesis, Columbia University, New York, 2006, pp. 55, 67, 101-118, 120-121, 136, 140, 143-144, 171.
- Lewes, James (1964-1968), “The Underground Press in America : Outlining an Alternative, the Envisioning of an Underground”, Journal of Communication Inquiry, October, 2000, pp. 379–400
- Dreyer, Thorne and Victoria Smith (1969), "The Movement and the New Media," Liberation News Service.
- Rossinow, Doug, The Politics of Authenticity: Liberalism, Christianity, and the New Left in America, Columbia University Press (1998), pp. 187, 191-2, 224, 236, 239, 243, 257-263, 267, 272-3, 279, 281, 285-6, 290, 306, 308-311, 315, 317, 326-329, 332, 335.
- Pardun, Robert, Prairie Radical : A Journey Through the Sixties (2001), Shire Press, pp, 3, 162-3, 180, 184-185, 194, 227, 262, 291.
- Anderson, Terry H., The Movement and the Sixties (1995), Oxford University Press, pp. 209, 224, 226, 247, 275.
- Garrow, David J., Liberty and Sexuality : the Right to Privacy and the Making of Roe v. Wade (1998), University of California Press, pp. 389–395, 438-439, 454, 745, 858-863, 871-878, 884-904, 1005, 1037.
- Wachsberger, Ken, editor, Voices From the Underground : Insider Histories of the Vietnam Era Underground Press (1993), Mica Press, pp. 78, 149, 165, 167, 378, 382.
- Weddington, Sarah, A Question of Choice (1993), Penguin Books, pp. 15–19, 21, 27, 35, 63-64, 138, 169.
