= John Ross (activist) =

American author and activist (1938–2011)

- Born: March 11, 1938; New York City
- Died: January 17, 2011 (aged 72); Tzintzuntzan, Mexico
- Occupation: Journalist
- Known for: Anti-war activism

John Ross (March 11, 1938 – January 17, 2011) was an American author, poet, journalist, and activist who lived in Mexico and wrote extensively on the country's politics, its people and leftwing political movements.

== Early life ==
Born in New York City, Ross was raised in Soho before it was recognized as a neighborhood. Upon graduating from the Bronx High School of Science, he become part of the Beat movement. As a young man, Ross migrated to Mexico in the late 1950s with his wife Norma and youngest daughter Dylan, living in Michoacán with his family from 1956 to 1962.

== Activism ==
In 1962, returned to the United States where he became one of the earliest draft resisters in America during the Vietnam War, for which he was prosecuted. He served time in federal prison at California's Terminal Island.[1][2]

Upon his release from prison Ross resumed living in San Francisco and began organizing a San Francisco chapter of the Progressive Labor Party from a storefront in the Mission District. From there, he moved to Arcata, California, in the early 1970s.

== Writing ==
Active as a journalist living and writing in Mexico from the mid-1980s, Ross moved full-time to Mexico City in the early 1990s, dedicating himself to his journalism and writing non-fiction books and poetry.

A prolific journalist, Ross wrote many articles for San Francisco periodical CounterPunch and Pacific News Service, and the Mexico City daily La Jornada. Since 1993, when Ross first broke the story in the Anderson Valley Advertiser, he regularly covered the Zapatista Army of National Liberation (also known as the EZLN or Zapatistas) rebellion in Chiapas province, his articles appearing in both English and Spanish language news publications.

Ross covered political corruption in Mexico and the United States, the effects of the North American Free Trade Agreement (NAFTA), on Mexico's subsistence agriculture, and the Iraq War, and potential environmental threats from the introduction of genetically modified plants— in particular those utilizing genetic use restriction technology. His articles appeared in the San Francisco Bay Guardian, The Nation, CounterPunch, The Progressive, La Jornada, and The Rag Blog.

Ross was the author of ten books, including a gritty portrait of his beloved Mexico City, El Monstruo: Dread and Redemption in Mexico City.

His work reflected a deep and abiding interest in rebel movements such as the Zapatistas in southern Chiapas state. He wrote several books about the Zapatistas (the 1995 American Book Award-winning Rebellion from the Roots, The War Against Oblivion, and ¡ZAPATISTAS! Making Another World Possible), as well as a somewhat autobiographical memoir (Murdered by Capitalism), and several chapbooks of poetry. Lastly, he had initiated the publication of Iraqi Girl: Diary of a Teenage Girl in Iraq.

In early 2003 he traveled to Iraq as a freelance reporter, voluntarily serving as a "human shield" to help protect Iraqi civilians during the U.S.-led invasion. The volunteers were eventually forced out of the country because they were critical of the Iraqi government's choice of sites to protect.

== Death ==
Ross died of liver cancer in Tzintzuntzan, Michoacán, Mexico, surrounded by his friends and family. Ross is survived by his oldest daughter Dylan, his son, notable record producer Dante Ross, his youngest daughter Carla and his granddaughters, Honore Ford and Zoe Ross Murray.

== Bibliography ==
=== Books ===
- Rebellion from the Roots: Indian Uprising in Chiapas (Common Courage Press: 1995)
- Mexico in Focus (Latin America Bureau: 1996) ISBN 1-899365-05-2
- We Came to Play: An Anthology of Writings on Basketball (with Qentin R. Hand)(North Atlantic Books: 1996) ISBN 1-55643-162-7
- The Annexation of Mexico: From the Aztecs to the IMF (Common Courage Press: 1998) ISBN 1-56751-131-7
- Tonatiuh's People: A Novel of the Mexican Cataclysm (Cinco Puntos Press: 1998) ISBN 0-938317-41-5
- Mexico in Focus: A Guide to the People, Politics, and Culture (Interlink Publishing Group: 2002) ISBN 1-56656-421-2
- The War Against Oblivion: The Zapatista Chronicles (Common Courage Press: 2002) ISBN 1-56751-175-9
- Murdered by Capitalism: A Memoir of 150 Years of Life & Death on the American Left (Nation Books: 2004) ISBN 1-56025-578-1
- ¡ZAPATISTAS! Making Another World Possible: Chronicles of Resistance 2000–2006 (Nation Books: 2007) ISBN 1-56025-874-8
- El Monstruo: Dread and Redemption in Mexico City (Nation Books: 2009) ISBN 1-56858-424-5
- Rebel Reporting: John Ross Speaks to Independent Journalists (by Norman Stockwell and Cristalyne Bell, editors), Amy Goodman (introduction), Robert W. McChesney (foreword) (Hamilton Books: 2015) ISBN 978-0761866602

=== Poetry chapbooks ===
- Jam (Mercury Litho-Bug Press: 1976)
- 12 Songs of Love and Ecocide (1977)
- The Psoriacis of Heartbreak (1979)
- The Daily Planet (1981)
- Running Out of Coastlines (1983)
- Heading South (1986)
- Whose Bones (1990)
- Jazzmexico (Calaca de Pelón: 1996)
- Against Amnesia (Calaca de Pelón: 2002)
- Bomba (Calaca de Pelón: 2007)
