= Greg Calvert =

American political activist and author (1937–2005)

Gregory Calvert
- Born: Gregory Alan Calvert; April 16, 1937; Longview, Washington, U.S.
- Died: August 12, 2005 (aged 68); Albuquerque, New Mexico, U.S.
- Education: University of Oregon; Cornell University
- Occupations: Political activist; Author; Academic
- Known for: National Secretary of Students for a Democratic Society (1966–1967)
- Notable work: Democracy from the Heart (1991)
- Spouse: Carol Neiman

Gregory Nevala Calvert (April 16, 1937 – August 12, 2005) was an American political activist, author and academic. In 1965, while teaching at Iowa State University, he joined Students for a Democratic Society (SDS). The following year he was elected SDS National Secretary. During this time, he also served on the National Mobilization Committee to End the War in Vietnam (MOBE). In 1991, he published a memoir of his activist years entitled Democracy from the Heart: Spiritual Values, Decentralism, and Democratic Idealism in the Movement of the 1960s.

== Biography ==
=== Early years ===
Gregory Alan Calvert was born in April 1937 in Longview, Washington. He was the eldest child of Clyde Walter Calvert and Nellie Louise Nevala (Gregory would later take his mother's maiden name as his middle name). The Calvert residence was a squatter's shack on the slopes of the Mount St. Helens volcano, and the family lived in harsh rural poverty. As a boy, Gregory spent a number of years with his Finnish grandparents; they lived on a small farm, and he became fluent in Finnish. He was an excellent student and eventually won a Weyerhaeuser scholarship to the University of Oregon.

After graduating in 1960 with a BA in history, Calvert obtained a Woodrow Wilson Fellowship, enabling him to work toward a graduate degree in European History at Cornell University. Next, he studied for two years at the University of Paris, and then returned to Cornell in the fall of 1963 where he obtained his PhD in Political and Social Theory. In 1964, Calvert accepted a teaching position at Iowa State University in Ames, Iowa. He taught a History of Western Civilization course and was the creative force behind, and the faculty advisor for, the alternative weekly student newspaper The Liberator. Calvert was able to bring renowned writers and intellectuals such as Paul Goodman and Stephen Spender to speak at Iowa State.

=== SDS involvement ===
In the fall of 1965, Calvert and about a dozen others started a local SDS chapter at Iowa State. He and Jane Adams from the SDS Midwest Regional office would soon rise to national prominence within the organization. At the SDS committee meeting in June 1966, Adams agreed to serve as interim National Secretary until the convention at the end of August in Clear Lake, Iowa. She appointed Calvert as her Acting Assistant National Secretary, and he also became editor of New Left Notes. At the convention, Calvert was elected National Secretary. His election was part of a "prairie power" trend in the SDS. The organization sought to correct its tendency to be overly controlled by East Coast and West Coast leftists without drawing sufficient talent from the Midwest "prairie".

In her book Prairie Power: Voices of 1960s Midwestern Student Protest, Robbie Lieberman describes Calvert's contributions to SDS ideology:

Calvert wrote in 1967 that the basis of radical consciousness was 'the discovery of oneself as one of the oppressed (emphasis in original). Calvert was among those who proposed that many middle-class professionals (including students, who would come to play those roles) were members of a "new working class" whose role in bringing about social change was critical precisely because of their place in the knowledge industry. He suggested that "[w]hat has held the new radicalism together, what has given it its life and vitality, has been the conviction that the gut-level alienation from America-the-Obscene-and-the-Dehumanized was a sincere and realistic basis for challenging America." The black power movement expressed this idea in different terms, but the point was that radicalism began with an affirmation rather than an apology for one's identity.

As National Secretary of SDS and a leader of MOBE, Calvert influenced how the 1967 March on the Pentagon unfolded. A number of angry demonstrators wanted to launch a suicidal charge at the soldiers guarding the entrance to the Pentagon. Calvert was able to dissuade them against that plan and instead to face down the soldiers for hours and thereby avoid bloodshed. He was a pacifist who believed in non-violent methods of protest and confrontation. The tension over tactics at the March on the Pentagon was symptomatic of a new "mood of militancy" which gripped the SDS and anti-war movement, as Lawrence Rosenwald writes:

[N]onviolent resistance had begun to many to seem insufficient, a sellout, and plans were afoot to fight with police in the streets and "trash" downtown Washington, D.C. Counseled by David Dellinger and Barbara Deming—the latter in particular helping him to articulate a "non-heterosexual perspective" on the movement's still-underacknowledged "violence-prone machismo"—he [Calvert] managed to hold the group together and kept it from splintering at least for a time. Soon enough, the SDS did split—some female members forming feminist groups, the Weather Underground bombing the Capitol, the Pentagon, the State Department—and Calvert withdrew from his former role.

=== Post-SDS ===
After the demise of the SDS at the end of the 1960s, Calvert lived in Austin, Texas. He and his wife at the time, Carol Neiman, co-authored A Disrupted History: The New Left and the New Capitalism (1971). In their book, they argued that the New Left was a logical response to "Neocapitalism", which they termed "the third stage of capitalist development" after "laissez faire" and "monopoly capitalism".

Over the next few years, Calvert contributed to various journalistic and educational projects. For instance, he inspired his younger brother Alex, along with David MacBryde, to start The Armadillo Press. Calvert worked for a while in the Illinois State Drug Rehabilitation program. He occasionally wrote articles for the alternative newspaper The Rag. He continued his own education by studying in the History of Consciousness program at UC Santa Cruz. He also pursued a lifelong interest in Buddhism, and set up a practice in the late 1970s as a Buddhist psychotherapist.

=== Later years ===
In 1991, Calvert summarized many of his New Left ideas in Democracy from the Heart: Spiritual Values, Decentralism, and Democratic Idealism in the Movement of the 1960s. In 1995, he and his partner Dr. Ken Carpenter co-founded a Spanish language school, Casa Xalteva, in Granada, Nicaragua. They remained at the school for three years before returning for financial reasons to teach at the University of New Mexico.

On August 12, 2005, Gregory Calvert died of pneumonia and complications from diabetes in a hospice in Albuquerque, New Mexico. He was 68.

== Works ==
=== Books ===
- A Disrupted History: The New Left and the New Capitalism. New York: Random House. 1971. ISBN 039446267X. Co-authored with Carol Neiman.
- Democracy from the Heart: Spiritual Values, Decentralism, and Democratic Idealism in the Movement of the 1960s. Eugene, OR: Communitas Press. 1991. ISBN 0962880000.

=== Speeches and essays ===
- "In White America: Liberal Conscience vs. Radical Consciousness" (PDF). Lost Writings of SDS. Speech by Calvert at the SDS Princeton Conference in February 1967.
- "Shake the Empire!" (PDF). The Movement. December 1967. p. 5. JSTOR community.28040902. Interview with Calvert in November 1967.
- Calvert, Gregory Nevala (2007). "Democratic Idealism: SDS and the Gospel of Participatory Democracy". In Roussopoulos, Dimitrios I. (ed.). The New Left: Legacy and Continuity. Black Rose Books. pp. 105–129. ISBN 978-1551642994.
