= Alan Pogue =

American journalist

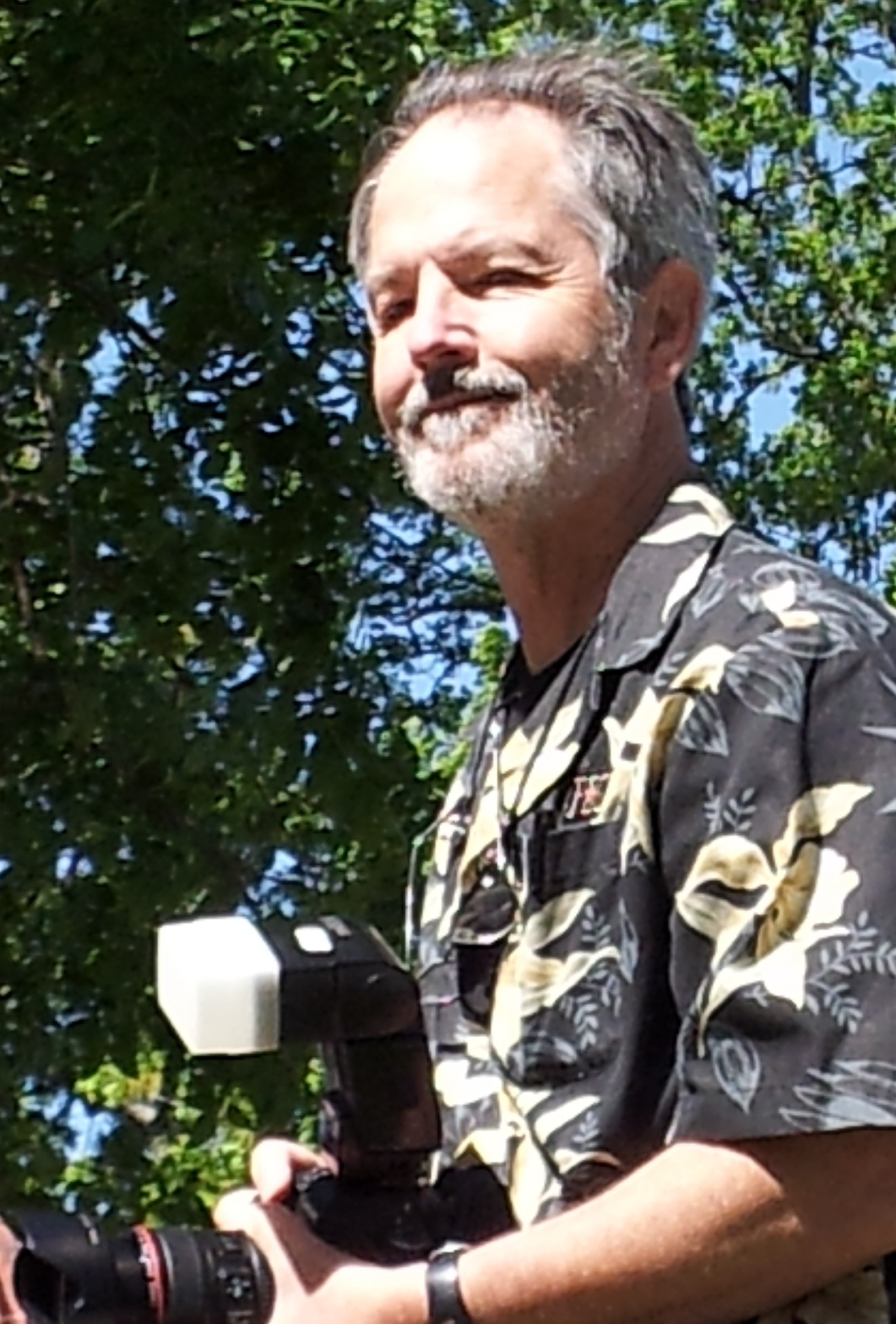
- Born: 1946 (age 79–80); Corpus Christi, Texas, U.S.
- Occupation: Photojournalist

Alan Pogue (born 1946 in Corpus Christi, Texas) is a photojournalist who works exclusively in black-and-white documentary photography. His career focuses on social justice and Texas politics spanning from the early 1970s to the present. Pogue has worked in many areas around the world, including Cuba, Pakistan, Iraq, Chiapas, Haiti, Saudi Arabia, and Rio Grande valley of Texas.

== Early years ==
During his youth, Pogue was raised a Catholic in Corpus Christi, Texas. At the age of nine, Pogue had a vivid and detailed experience, when a mental picture of a street scene was imprinted in his mind, as if a photograph had been taken.

During the Vietnam War, Pogue was drafted into the U.S. Army Chaplain Corps. As he left home to serve in the war, his mother gave him a Kodak Instamatic, asking him to send her pictures because she knew he wasn't going to write. Disillusioned with the war and with the Chaplain Corps, he volunteered as a front-line medic with the 198th Light Infantry Brigade. This took him to the front lines, providing him opportunities to take pictures. Taking snapshots of G.I.s and Vietnamese piqued his interest in photography and became the impetus for his career in documentary photography.

During the 1968 Tet Offensive, he endured shelling and witnessed a member of his unit being shot to death, leading him to question the justification of the war. Taking snapshots in Vietnam using his Instamatic camera is considered to have sparked his career in photography.

Returning to the United States, Pogue enrolled in the University of Texas at Austin to study philosophy. He became the staff photographer for the university's underground paper, The Rag, published in Austin, Texas, during the '60s and '70s. During this time, he lived a frugal life, in order to better afford opportunities to pursue his interests. He kept his rent low by living in a janitor's closet at the University YWCA, and he found free meals at Les Amis, a cafe that treated him as its artist-in-residence. Pogue took odd jobs related to photography, such as wedding and passport work, as well as his income from the Texas Observer, which earned him $5 a picture.

In 1980, Pogue had his first real photography show at Brazos Books. It was there he met Russell Lee, a noted photographer from the depression-era Farm Security Administration. Lee befriended Pogue and became his mentor. At their last meeting before Lee died in 1986 Lee made Pogue commit to never abandon his work in black-and-white still photography. Pogue promised this and has kept his word.

== Career ==
Pogue found the University of Texas students’ protests against the Vietnam War to be a common subject in 1970. He also documented active-duty soldiers from Fort Hood, gathering in front of a G.I. coffeehouse, prior to demonstrating against the war in Killeen, Texas. This led to him further pursuing photography, aiming to capture striking images of intimate human conditions. His work focuses on social justice, and spans multiple geographies, from the mainland US, to Cuba, to Iraq.

Of note, a 1972 photograph taken during the struggle for reproductive freedom taken by Pogue shows a woman in the University YMCA on the phone, providing information on birth control and abortion. The woman in this image later helped persuade Sarah Weddington to take on the landmark Roe v. Wade case.

During 1974, Pogue captured images of civil rights protests on Austin's east side, where Brown Berets led hundreds of marchers to the police station to protest killings of Mexican American and African American youths by the police. In 1982, he again documented a demonstration, this time after a Mexican American youth was killed by Dallas police.

His interest in social justice organizations grew and they became both the subject of his documentary photography and his politics. He used showings of his photography to speak about social injustice. His 1979 "The Short-Handled Hoe" from Hidalgo, Texas exposed the cruelty of growers forcing field workers to bend over solely to discern whether they were working. He documented the work of the United Farm Workers, and photographed its leaders, Cesar Chavez and Dolores Huerta. Pogue provided a 1993 photograph titled 'Farmworker Women' to support the National Center for Farmworker Health. The 'Migrant Clinicians Network' is a beneficiary of Pogue's support.

Pogue used his photography to document the plight of prisoners held in the Texas state prison system. His 'Photographs from prison' support the work of Citizens United for Rehabilitation of Errants (CURE) a grassroots organization of Texas origin. He has chronicled inmates sitting on Texas' death row. His photographs appear in 'Behind the Walls: A Guide for Families and Friends of Texas Prison Inmates' by Antonio Antonio Renaud.

When members of the Christian Peacemaker Team chained themselves to a house in the West Bank in 1998, attempting to prevent its demolition by Israeli forces, Pogue preserved the moment on film. In Jerusalem, he captured the members of Bat Shalom's Women in Black, while they protested the occupation of Palestine.

During the embargo of Iraq following the 1991 first Gulf War, Pogue went to Iraq, despite a State Department ban on travel there. Near Basra he photographed an Iraqi girl, Asraa' Mizyad, whose arm was severed by a fragment from a U.S. cruise missile. This image is among Pogue's most well known. He made five trips to Iraq with Veterans For Peace between 1998 and 2004.

During his career, Pogue also managed to capture many well known Texans, including, John Henry Faulk, Sissy Farenthold, Barbara Jordan, Molly Ivins, Ann Richards, Jim Hightower, and former president George W. Bush.

== Present ==
Pogue won The Austin Chronicle's Best Photographer reader's poll six times and is the 2009 Best All Around Winner in the Media category. In 1983 Pogue received the Dobie Paisano Fellowship, recognizing his writings related to Texas.

A longtime member of Veterans for Peace, Pogue has used his photography to support the organization.

Pogue is a staff photographer for the Texas Observer in Austin, Texas, since 1971. He continues his work at the Texas Center for Documentary Photography in Austin and supports the causes of justice that have been the core of his documentary photograph career.

During the coronavirus pandemic, Pogue journeyed to Oklahoma to cover President Donald Trump's June 20, 2020 Tulsa rally. The Texas Observer provided Pogue a letter for the purpose of establishing press credentials. He was able to enter the Bank of America Center where the rally was held. While waiting for Trump to arrive, Pogue ventured outside to investigate a commotion caused by a group of Black Lives Matter protestors. He took photos of protestors being arrested, which came to the attention of the police. Pogue was arrested on the scene and taken to jail, with the reason for arrest cited by the police as 'obstruction'. He was released the following day.
