= NLN (gene) =

Protein-coding gene in the species Homo sapiens

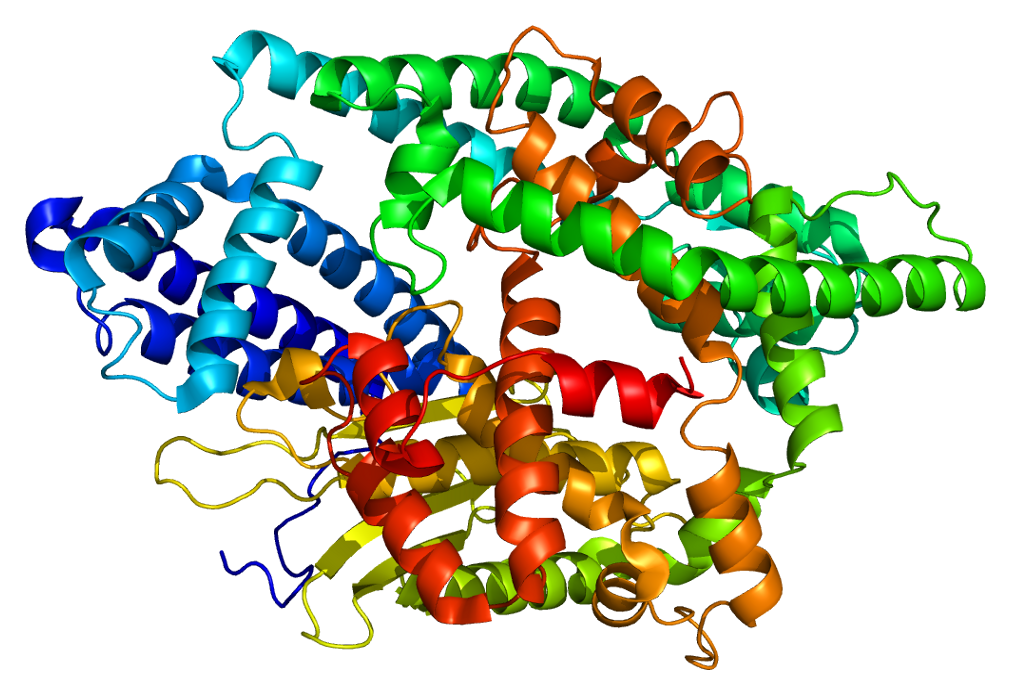

Identifiers
- Aliases: NLN, AGTBP, EP24.16, MEP, MOP, neurolysin
- External IDs: OMIM: 611530; MGI: 1923055; GeneCards: NLN
Enzyme activity
EC #	BRENDA	ExPASy	KEGG	MetaCyc
3.4.24.16	↗	↗	↗	↗

Gene location (Human)
Chr.	Chromosome 5 (human)
Band	5q12.3	Start	65,722,205 bp
Band	5q12.3	End	65,871,725 bp

Gene location (Mouse)
Chr.	Chromosome 13 (mouse)
Band	13|13 D1	Start	104,159,565 bp
Band	13|13 D1	End	104,246,122 bp
RNA expression pattern
Bgee	Human / Mouse (ortholog); Top expressed in: endothelial cell; secondary oocyte; tibialis anterior muscle; mucosa of ileum; pancreatic ductal cell; stromal cell of endometrium; monocyte; gastrocnemius muscle; deltoid muscle; ganglionic eminence / Top expressed in: tail of embryo; genital tubercle; superior cervical ganglion; Rostral migratory stream; spermatocyte; blastocyst; secondary oocyte; cumulus cell; left lobe of liver; fossa; More reference expression data
BioGPS	n/a
Gene ontology
Molecular function	peptide binding; peptidase activity; hydrolase activity; metallopeptidase activity; metal ion binding; metalloendopeptidase activity
Cellular component	cytoplasm; mitochondrial intermembrane space; plasma membrane; mitochondrion; extracellular region
Biological process	regulation of gluconeogenesis; regulation of skeletal muscle fiber differentiation; proteolysis; peptide metabolic process
Sources:Amigo / QuickGO
Orthologs
Databases	NCBI: entry; OMA: entry
Species	Human	Mouse
Entrez	57486	75805
Ensembl	ENSG00000123213	ENSMUSG00000021710
UniProt	Q9BYT8	Q91YP2
RefSeq (mRNA)	NM_020726	NM_029447
RefSeq (protein)	NP_065777	NP_083723
Location (UCSC)	Chr 5: 65.72 – 65.87 Mb	Chr 13: 104.16 – 104.25 Mb
PubMed search
- Wikidata
View/Edit Human	View/Edit Mouse

Neurolysin

Identifiers
- EC no.: 3.4.24.16
- CAS no.: 149371-24-4

Databases
- BRENDA: enzyme data
- ExPASy: NiceZyme view
- KEGG: enzyme entry
- MetaCyc: metabolic pathway
- Rhea: reactions
- PDB structures: RCSB PDB PDBe PDBsum
Search
- PMC: articles
- PubMed: articles
- NCBI: proteins

Neurolysin, mitochondrial is a protein that in humans is encoded by the NLN gene. It is a 78-kDa enzyme, widely distributed in mammalian tissues and found in various subcellular locations that vary with cell type. Neurolysin exemplifies the ability of neuropeptidases to target various cleavage site sequences by hydrolyzing them in vitro, and metabolism of neurotensin is the most important role of neurolysin in vivo. Neurolysin has also been implicated in pain control, blood pressure regulation, sepsis, reproduction, cancer biology pathogenesis of stroke, and glucose metabolism.

== Structure ==
=== Gene ===
The NLN gene lies on the chromosome location of 5q12.3 and consists of 14 exons.

=== Protein ===
Neurolysin, with 704 amino acid residues, is a zinc metalloendopeptidase with a conserved HEXXH motif. It has an overall prolate ellipsoid shape, with a deep narrow channel dividing it into two roughly equal domains. The catalytic site is contained within a thermolysin-like region found in many metallopeptidases and located in the domain near the floor of the channel.

== Function ==
Neurolysin hydrolyzes only peptides containing 5-17 amino acids by cleaving at a limited set of sites. The specificity of neurolysin for small bioactive peptides is due to the presence of large structural elements erected over its active site region that allow substrates access only through a deep narrow channel. In vitro, neurolysin exemplifies the ability of some neuropeptidases to target diverse cleavage site sequences. In vivo, their most established role is cleaving neurotensin between its 10th and 11th residues to produce inactive fragments and it has been recently identified as a non-AT1-non-AT2 angiotensin-binding site, with function pertaining to the rennin-angiotensin system. Neurotensin is involved in many processes including mast cell degranulation and regulation of central nervous system dopaminergic and cholinergic circuits. A lower level of neurotensin is associated with schizophrenia, and it is implicated in cardiovascular disorders, addiction, Huntington disease and Parkinson disease. Neurotensin is also one of the most potent blockers of pain perception.

== Clinical significance ==
Metabolism of neurotensin is the most important role of neurolysin in vivo and has been identified as a non-AT1-non-AT2 angiotensin-binding site. Neurotensin is involved in many processes including mast cell degranullation and regulation of central nervous system dopaminergic and cholinergic circuits. Neurolysin has also been implicated in pain control, blood pressure regulation, sepsis, reproduction, cancer biology, pathogenesis of stroke, and glucose metabolism. Inhibition of neurolysin has been shown to produce neurotensin-induced analgesia in mice, and control of neurotensin levels by neurolysin may serve as a potential target for antipsychotic therapies.

== Interactions ==
This protein is known to interact with:

- Neurotensin
- HIV-1
