= Lawrence Goodwyn =

American writer and political theorist (1928–2013)

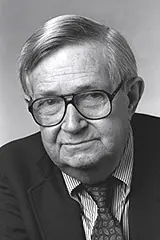
- Born: Lawrence Corbett Goodwyn; July 16, 1928; Fort Huachuca, Arizona, U.S.
- Died: September 29, 2013 (aged 85); Durham, North Carolina, U.S.
- Occupations: Journalist; editor; academic
- Spouse: Nell DeReese
- Children: Wade Goodwyn, Lauren Goodwyn

Academic background
- Education: Texas A&M University (BA); University of Texas at Austin (PhD)

Academic work
- Discipline: History
- Institutions: Duke University
- Main interests: Populism in the United States; History of the Southern United States

Lawrence Corbett Goodwyn (July 16, 1928 – September 29, 2013) was an American historian of democratic movements, journalist and political theorist known for his study of American populism. He served as a professor at Duke University from 1971 to 2003.

Goodwyn was best known for writing Democratic Promise: The Populist Moment in America, a book which chronicles the origins and rise of the People's Party, in the social and historical context from which it emerged, American Midwestern and Southwestern populism. The book was nominated for the National Book Award for Nonfiction in 1977, and it achieved finalist status. An abridged version of Democratic Promise, titled The Populist Moment: A Short History of the Agrarian Revolt in America, was published in 1978. The Populist Moment became a staple in university history seminars, labor organizing institutes and community activism efforts for years to come.

His publications generally focused on the Southwestern United States, but in 1991 he published Breaking the Barrier: the Rise of Solidarity in Poland, a book that focused on a working class movement from another region: Poland's Solidarnosc movement.

== Background ==
Goodwyn was born in 1928 at Fort Huachuca, a U.S. Army base in Arizona, where his father, a colonel, was then stationed. He graduated with a bachelor's degree in English from Texas A&M University. He later served in the U.S. Army in the Korean War and eventually ascended to the rank of captain. After his military service, he completed a doctoral program at the University of Texas. During his youth and education in Texas, he observed the systematic nature of white supremacy—an observation that motivated him to fight against racism through his academic career and political activism.

== Career ==
Before beginning his academic career, Goodwyn's career as an investigative journalist motivated him to get involved in political activism alongside African American, Latino, and white working class groups. During his time serving as an editor of the Texas Observer, he organized voters to advocate for the election of Democrats in the early 1960s, including his assistance in founding the Democratic Coalition. Meanwhile, his reporting for the Texas Observer chronicled the local political activism.

In 1964, Goodwyn toured the southern U.S. to document Black community organizing in the harrowing struggle for civil rights. He began in the Mississippi Delta during the Mississippi Freedom Summer. He continued documenting the movement in Montgomery, Alabama, and met James Bevel, a leader of the Southern Christian Leadership Conference. Then, he moved on to Saint Augustine, Florida, where ongoing civil rights organizing had gained national attention. Through participant observation, Goodwyn witnessed the resilience of local Black activists despite white supremacist violence and presence in the local police force. His work in Saint Augustine culminated in his publication of a 1965 article in Harper's Magazine, titled "Anarchy in Saint Augustine," which documented the local struggle for civil rights.

Duke University hired Goodwyn as a professor in 1971. There, he and his colleagues, William Chafe and Ray Gavins, created Duke's oral history program. According to the New York Times, the program "employed many black graduate students, in part because Dr. Goodwyn insisted that whites should not have sole possession of Southern history." Not only did Goodwyn teach his students anti-racism, but he heavily emphasized that he, as a white man, constituted "part of the problem of authority," radically owning his own privilege.

In 1976, Goodwyn published Democratic Promise: The Populist Moment in America, which became widely assigned reading at American universities. [3] Drawing on archival research documented in its "Essay on Sources," the book challenged the prevailing historiography of American populism, notably Richard Hofstadter's interpretation, and grounded its account in primary documentary evidence.

Goodwyn retired from Duke University in 2003.

== Personal life and death ==
Goodwyn and his wife, the former Nell DeReese, had a daughter, Lauren, and a son, Wade, who was a journalist who worked largely for NPR.

Goodwyn died from emphysema at his home in Durham, North Carolina, on September 29, 2013, at the age of 85.

== Books ==
- 1967 - The South Central States: Arkansas, Louisiana, Oklahoma, Texas (Time-Life library of America)
- 1976 - Democratic Promise: The Populist Moment in America
- 1978 - The Populist Moment: A Short History of the Agrarian Revolt in America (abridged version of Democratic Promise)
- 1991 - Breaking the Barrier: The Rise of Solidarity in Poland
- 1996 - Texas Oil, American Dreams: a Study of the Texas Independent Producers and Royalty Owners Association
