= The Texas Observer =

American magazine

- Categories: Politics
- Frequency: Bimonthly
- Founder: Frankie Randolph and Ronnie Dugger
- Founded: 1954
- Company: Texas Democracy Foundation
- Country: United States
- Based in: Austin, Texas
- Language: English
- Website: www.texasobserver.org
- ISSN: 0040-4519

The Texas Observer (also known as the Observer) is an American magazine with a liberal political outlook. The Observer is published bimonthly by a 501(c)(3) nonprofit organization, the Texas Democracy Foundation. It is based in Austin, Texas.

On March 27, 2023, it announced that it was ceasing publication. However, on March 29, it was announced that publication would continue following a successful crowdfunding campaign by staff, and its publication has continued since.

== History ==
The Observer was founded by Frankie Randolph and Ronnie Dugger in Austin in 1954 to address topics often ignored by daily newspapers in the state, such as those affecting working people and concerning class and racism.

According to Texas Public Radio (TPR), the early Observer "represented the liberal wing of the once-conservative Democratic Party" that was dominant in Texas. During this period, the Observer was critical of conservative or moderate Texas Democrats, including Lyndon B. Johnson during his Senate tenure and Governors Allan Shivers and John Connally. In the 1970s, Molly Ivins served as the Observer's co-editor and a political reporter.

In 2000, the Observer published a major investigation by Nate Blakeslee into a drug bust in the town of Tulia, which led to criminal exonerations. The story was later expanded into a book.

In 2010, the Observer published an exposé on then-Governor Rick Perry's "Enterprise Fund". The report found that 20 recipients of the 55 grants available through the fund were given to Perry campaign contributors or contributors to the Republican Governors Association (RGA) after he became chairman.

In 2015, the Observer won a National Magazine Award for its series by Melissa del Bosque with the Guardian titled "Beyond the Border."

In March 2023, the board of the Observer's parent organization, the nonprofit Texas Democracy Foundation, voted to close the publication and lay off its 17 employees, including 13 journalists. A crowdfunding campaign to save the publication raised over $300,000 in two days. The campaign was successful.

The Observer since continued publication. In 2025, it exposed a federal immigration prosecutor as the operator of a white supremacist social media account, prompting a congressional response, and in 2026 it published a cover story uncovering school districts with the highest arrest rates of students under 13 years of age.

== Notable staff and contributors ==
Notable Observer staff and contributors, past and present:

- Jake Bernstein
- Billy Lee Brammer
- Minnie Fisher Cunningham
- J. Frank Dobie
- Ronnie Dugger
- John Henry Faulk
- James K. Galbraith
- Dagoberto Gilb
- Lawrence Goodwyn
- Jim Hightower
- Molly Ivins
- Larry L. King
- Maury Maverick Jr.
- Larry McMurtry
- Willie Morris
- Americo Paredes
- Alan Pogue
- Eileen Welsome
- Nate Blakeslee
- Melissa del Bosque
- Naomi Shihab Nye
