= Next Left Notes =

American leftist publication (2004–2015)

- Let The People Decide
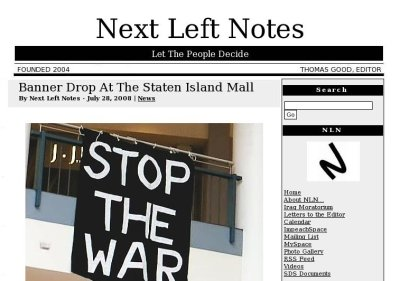
- Type: web/print journal
- Format: web, magazine
- Editor: Thomas Altfather Good
- Founded: 2004
- Ceased publication: 2015
- Political alignment: New Left
- Headquarters: New York City
- Website: nextleftnotes.net

Next Left Notes (NLN) was a radical American weblog and news publication started in 2004 as a successor to New Left Notes, which had been the voice of the 1960s Students for a Democratic Society (SDS). In 2006, NLN became associated with the re-established SDS. Calling itself an independent New Left journal, NLN began publishing print versions in March 2008 to mark its 4th anniversary. The journal featured domestic reporting from a left-wing perspective. It ceased operations in 2015.

== Founding and new SDS ==
Next Left Notes was founded as a radical weblog in March 2004 by Thomas Altfather Good. He was an organizer with the Direct Action Tendency group of the Socialist Party USA when he conceived the idea of starting a news publication patterned after New Left Notes. He served as NLN's editor and main photojournalist until its demise in 2015.

In January 2006, Good was one of the prime movers in creating a reconstituted SDS. Unlike its New Left Notes predecessor, Next Left Notes was never officially connected to the SDS. Instead, there was an informal connection since Good and other NLN staff members belonged to the Movement for a Democratic Society (MDS), a sister organization (composed of non-students) that emerged from the 2006 SDS National Convention in Chicago.

== Publication and ideology ==
In its "About" page, NLN stated that it "paid close attention to the work of SDS and student activism while covering the Movement in general." It added that its role was to be both reporter and participant in New Left actions, protests, conferences "and all other aspects of the Struggle. We'll see you in the streets." As an example, in February 2008 at a New York City-based Army recruiting station, NLN staff members joined in a protest against the deployment of additional troops to the Iraq War, while also writing about the event. NLN content consisted of articles, commentary, and photo galleries. On its masthead was the original New Left Notes motto, "Let The People Decide".

Next Left Notes article contributors included:

- 1960s SDS veterans such as Bernardine Dohrn, Bill Ayers, Paul Buhle, and Mark Rudd.
- Younger leftists in the new SDS: Allison Van Doren, Brendan Dunn, Brian Kelly, and Pat Korte.
- Prominent pacifists such as David McReynolds and Frida Berrigan.
- Labor activists including Penny Rosemont of Charles H. Kerr, and various members of the Industrial Workers of the World (IWW).

=== Criticism ===
Some writers outside the new SDS criticized Good and NLN as "militant", "sectarian" and too close to former members of the Weather Underground.

=== Format ===
NLN content was initially only available on the web. In March 2008, a free print edition was introduced that could be downloaded in PDF format. All NLN articles and photographs were released (except where noted) under the GNU General Public License.

== See also ==
- Port Militarization Resistance
- March 17, 2007 anti-war protest
- Brian Flanagan
- Jeff Jones (activist)
