= WFTE =

- Mount Cobb, Pennsylvania; United States
- Broadcast area: Greater Scranton, Pennsylvania 105.7 Scranton, Pennsylvania
- Frequency: 90.3 MHz
- Branding: WFTE Community Radio

Programming
- Format: Defunct (formerly Community)

Ownership
- Owner: Community Radio Collective, Inc.

History
- First air date: 2011
- Last air date: September 27, 2016

Technical information
- Licensing authority: FCC
- Facility ID: 172918
- Class: A
- ERP: 3,000 watts
- HAAT: 29 meters (95 feet)
- Transmitter coordinates: 41°23′9″N 75°24′7″W

Links
- Public license information: Public file; LMS
- Website: wfte.org

WFTE (90.3 FM) was a radio station licensed to serve Mount Cobb, Pennsylvania, and (105.7 FM) Scranton, Pennsylvania The station's licensee was Community Radio Collective, Inc., a 501(c)(3) non-profit charitable organization.

WFTE Community Radio aired live on the air in 2011. With translator W289AU on 105.7 FM, WFTE Community Radio broadcast to around 500,000 residents in the greater Scranton, Pennsylvania area. For a time, WFTE provided the studio equipment for Bob Fass's long-running radio show Radio Unnameable, which was in turn syndicated back to Fass's former flagship WBAI and a limited number of other affiliates.

WFTE's license was cancelled by the Federal Communications Commission on June 27, 2018, due to the station having been silent since September 27, 2016.
