= Eberle =

Eberle is a southern German diminutive form of the surname Eber. Notable people with the surname include:

- Abastenia St. Leger Eberle (1878–1942), American sculptor
- Adam Eberle (1804–1832), German painter
- Adolf Eberle (1843–1914), German painter
- Benjamin Eberle (born 1963), Liechtensteiner cross-country skier
- Chantelle Eberle (born 1981), Canadian curler
- Dan Eberle (born 1974), American actor and director
- Derek Eberle (born 1972), Canadian ice hockey player
- Dietmar Eberle (born 1952), Austrian architect
- Dominik Eberle (born 1996), German American football player
- Edward Walter Eberle (1864–1929), US Admiral
- Emilia Eberle (born 1964), Romanian athlete
- Eugene A. Eberle (1840–1917), American actor
- Ewald Eberle (1933–2025), Liechtensteiner alpine skier
- Fabian Eberle (born 1992), Liechtensteiner football player
- Hans Eberle (canoeist), German canoe racer
- Hans Eberle (1925–1988), German football player
- Henrik Eberle (born 1970), German historian
- Ingrid Eberle (born 1957), Austrian alpine skier
- James Eberle (1927–2018), British Royal Navy admiral
- Jan Eberle (born 1989), Czech ice hockey player
- Jane Eberle, American politician
- Jordan Eberle (born 1990), Canadian ice hockey player
- Jörg Eberle (born 1962), Swiss ice hockey player
- Josef Eberle (1901–?), Czech long-distance runner
- Lucas Eberle (born 1990), Liechtensteiner football player
- Marc Eberle (born 1980), German football player
- Maria Kaiser-Eberle (born 1959), mayor of Ruggell, Liechtenstein
- Markus Eberle (born 1969), German alpine skier
- Mary Eberle (born 1949), American politician
- Merab Eberle (1891–1959), American journalist, author, poet
- Paul Eberle, American author
- Ray Eberle (1919–1979), American singer
- Robert Eberle (1815–1859), German painter
- Shirley Eberle, American author
- Syrius Eberle (1844–1903), German sculptor and painter
- Tod Eberle (1886–1967), American football coach
- Veronika Eberle (born 1988), German violinist
- Vreni Eberle (born 1950), German swimmer
- William D. Eberle (1923–2008), American businessman and politician
- Wolrad Eberle (1908–1949), German athlete

== See also ==
- USS Eberle
- Eberly
- Eberl
- Eber
