= Emerle =

Emerle is a surname. Notable people with the surname include:

- Colin Emerle (born 1979), American musician
- Justin Emerle (born 1976), American musician, brother of Colin

== See also ==
- Eberle
