= Eyerly =

Eyerly is a surname. Notable people with the surname include:

- Jeannette Eyerly (1908–2008), American writer of young adult fiction
- Lee Eyerly (1892–1963), American civil aviation pioneer and amusement ride manufacturer
  - Eyerly Aircraft Company, company in Salem, Oregon, US

== See also ==
- Eberly
