= Paul and Shirley Eberle =

American writing duo

Paul Eberle (1928–2012) and Shirley Eberle (1929–2021) were American authors. Paul Eberle wrote for the Los Angeles Free Press.

== Early lives ==
Paul Eberle was born August 21, 1928 to Chester T. Crowell and Irmengarde Eberle, both authors. He attented the University of Washington in Seattle and received a BA degree in 1954.

Shirley Anderson was born January 13, 1929 in Camas, Washington to George and Mabel Anderson. She attended the University of Washington in Seattle and Los Angeles Valley College.

Paul and Shirley were married December 4, 1950.

Paul worked as an announcer and executive at radio stations in Seattle and Los Angeles including KPFK.

== Freep ==
Shirley held advertising and editorial positions at Los Angeles Free Press from 1967 till 1971.

== L.A. Star family ==
Shirley was an editor of the Los Angeles Star (Note: OCLC 14126811) from 1971 until 1991.

== Works ==
In 1972 they wrote The Adventures of Mrs. Pussycat, a children's book illustrated by Anthony De Rosa.

They wrote the 1986 book The Politics of Child Abuse. It discusses false allegation of child sexual abuse in the day care sex abuse hysteria. Their 1993 book The Abuse of Innocence was about the McMartin preschool trial.

Paul Eberle wrote Terror on the Highway, a book on road rage, which was published in 2006.

== Publications ==
=== Works by Paul and Shirley Eberle ===
- The Adventures of Mrs. Pussycat. Illustrated by Anthony DeRosa. Prentice Hall. 1972. ISBN 0-13-014142-9.
- The Politics of Child Abuse. Lyle Stuart. 1986. ISBN 0-8184-0415-9.
- The Abuse of Innocence: The McMartin Preschool Trial. Prometheus Books. 1993. ISBN 0-87975-809-0.

=== Works by Paul Eberle ===
- "Les Crane Fired—Why?". Los Angeles Free Press. September 13, 1968. p. 2.
- "KHJ Cancels Discussions of Revolution, Bohrman out". Los Angeles Free Press. September 27, 1968. p. 21.
- "The Minutemen". East Village Other. Vol. 4, no. 34. July 23, 1969. p. 3. Full access available to users of The Wikipedia Library.
- The World's Worst Poems. Price Stern Sloan. 1978. OCLC 18775589. as Swan Egan DeButz
- Terror on the Highway: Rage on America's Roads. Prometheus Books. 2006. OCLC 62326665.

== Works cited ==
=== Books ===
- Locher, Frances C., ed. (1981). "EBERLE, Paul 1928-". Contemporary Authors. Vol. 101. Gale. p. 149.
- Olendorf, Donna, ed. (1994). "EBERLE, Shirley 1929-". Contemporary Authors. Vol. 142. Gale. p. 119-120.
- Bodroghkozy, Aniko (2001). Groove Tube: Sixties Television and the Youth Rebellion. Duke University Press.

=== Magazine articles ===
- Laurina, Maria (December 1988). "Custody Wars: Moms held hostage". Ms. Vol. 17. p. 88-95.

=== News articles ===
- Israeli, Phineas (September 12–18, 1969). "Labor Pains at Freep". Berkeley Tribe. Vol. 1, no. 10. p. 3. Full access available to users of The Wikipedia Library.
- Israeli, Phineas (September 19–25, 1969). "Bread and Butter for LA Freep Union". Berkeley Tribe. Vol. 1, no. 11. p. 7. Full access available to users of The Wikipedia Library.
- "Free L.A.". Good Times. Vol. II, no. 35. September 11, 1969. p. 4. Full access available to users of The Wikipedia Library.
- "SoPas In Crunch on Street Porno". Pasadena Star-News. August 15, 1973. p. A3. Full access available to users of The Wikipedia Library.
- "Actress has editor jailed". Daily Review. UPI. October 25, 1974. p. 2. Full access available to users of The Wikipedia Library.
- Thompson, Tom (November 1, 1974). "L.A. Star Raided". Los Angeles Free Press. Vol. 11, no. 44. p. 14. Full access available to users of The Wikipedia Library.
- Krassner, Paul (December 13–19, 1974). "Superfluity and Insanity". Berkeley Barb. Vol. 22, no. 487. p. 4. Full access available to users of The Wikipedia Library.

=== Other ===
- "U.S., Korean War Era Draft Cards, 1948-1959". Ancestry.com. Paul Eberle. Full access available to users of The Wikipedia Library.
- "U.S., Department of Veterans Affairs BIRLS Death File, 1850-2020". Ancestry.com. Paul Eberle. Full access available to users of The Wikipedia Library.
- "U.S., Cemetery and Funeral Home Collection, 1847-Current". Ancestry.com. Shirley M Eberle. Full access available to users of The Wikipedia Library.
