= Max Scherr =

American newspaper editor (1916–1981)

Max Scherr (March 12, 1916 – October 31, 1981) was an American underground newspaper editor and publisher known for his iconoclastic 1960s weekly, the Berkeley Barb.

== Early life ==
Scherr was born in Baltimore, Maryland, on March 12, 1916, in a Jewish household. His parents, Harry Scherr, a tailor, and Minnie, were Yiddish-speaking Russian immigrants who arrived in America in 1898. His early life is obscure. From 1935 to 1938, he attended law school at the University of Maryland, earning his law degree in June, 1938.

== Early Career, Baltimore ==
After June 1938, for the next three years he practiced law in Baltimore, including serving as legal counsel to Local 175 of the CIO-affiliated Transport Workers Union in a 1941 Baltimore taxi drivers strike. During World War II he served in the Navy. After demobilization he attended the University of California, Berkeley, earning a master's degree in sociology in 1949.

== Early Career, Berkeley ==
On a trip to Mexico in the 1940s he met and married Juana Estela Salgado, a medical student. Together, they had a daughter, Raquel Lorraine Scherr, born in 1947, and two sons, Sergio and David Scherr. Returning to California, they lived in Albany, and Berkeley, where Max Scherr worked for a publisher of legal textbooks, hanging out after work at a coffee shop called Il Piccolo Espresso, where he kibbitzed with local bohemians and radicals. By the end of the 1950s "The Pic" had become an important meeting place for SLATE, the progressive student party at U.C. Berkeley.

== Steppenwolf Bar ==
In 1958, Scherr purchased a local hangout popular with students and beatniks called the Steppenwolf at 2136 San Pablo Avenue, Berkeley, which became a stop on the West Coast folk music circuit. Scherr ran the Steppenwolf for seven years, selling it in 1965 for $10,000. In 1967, The Magic Theatre theatre company was founded here with John Lion's production of Eugène Ionesco's The Lesson.

== Berkeley Barb ==
Around 1960 Scherr had split from Juana Estela Salgado and moved in with a much younger woman named Jane Peters (born Beatrice J. Peters in 1937), with whom he had two daughters, Dove and Apollinaire. By 1965 they had moved into a large, colonnaded house at 2421 Oregon Street. Coming home from the food co-op, he informed Peters that they had to put a paper out in one week "or I'll be the laughingstock of Berkeley." At the end of the week the promised paper, mostly written by Scherr, appeared. The smudgy first issue of 8 tabloid pages was crudely printed in a small edition of 2000 copies, and the paper was launched on a run which lasted almost 15 years.

In 1965, after selling the Steppenwolf for $10,000, he used the money to launch the Barb.

The first issue of the Barb was dated August 13, 1965. Two thousand copies were printed and sold. According to legend, Scherr started the paper after a projected local paper to be published by the Berkeley food co-op failed to appear. Scoffing at the claim that it would cost $43,000 to launch a small local paper in Berkeley, he boasted that he would have the first issue out in a week.

The Barb quickly became the news and communications center for the militant New Left protest movements swirling around the Berkeley campus of the University of California, where the Free Speech Movement made nationwide headlines in 1964. By the fall of 1965 antiwar protest led by the Vietnam Day Committee and Jerry Rubin dominated campus activism in Berkeley, and the Barb soon emerged as the unofficial mouthpiece of the VDC. In the San Francisco Bay Area the paper provided a radical alternative to the stodgy conservatism and anticommunism of the established local press, dominated by Hearst's San Francisco Examiner, the Chronicle and William Knowland's Oakland Tribune. Max Scherr considered himself and the paper to be part of the revolutionary left, although he had never been in any organized left-wing party, and the paper's news coverage was often seen as baiting the police and authorities in Berkeley, with inflammatory headlines like "Pigs Shoot to Kill—Bystanders Gunned Down." The battle over People's Park which began in 1969 with an article by Stew Albert in the Barb was in some respects the paper's high-water mark in arousing its readers to militant activism in the streets, but the bitter aftermath, in which several protestors were shot and the city was occupied by the National Guard, left many in Berkeley with little appetite for further confrontation.

The paper grew rapidly, developing a nationwide following, and by mid-1969 Time reported that the paper was circulating 86,000 copies and charging $450 a page for advertising, turning an annual profit of $150,000. This led to conflict with the paper's staff of 40, which was earning at most the legal minimum wage, and the staff rebelled, forming the Red Mountain Tribe collective and issuing a special interim edition called Barb on Strike without Scherr, who managed to put out a bare-bones 8-page issue of the paper on schedule without assistance. Scherr succeeded in getting the Tribe out of the paper's offices, whereupon he moved the newspaper's equipment into a new office and hired a new staff. The Red Mountain Tribe retaliated by starting their own competing paper, the Berkeley Tribe, which lasted until 1972.

== Spectator Magazine ==
The Barb continued to decline. In 1978, with sales down to 20,000 copies (from a peak of over 100,000), in an effort to attract mainstream advertisers, the paper's lucrative sex ads were spun off into a separate publication, the Spectator. The decline continued, and by 1980 circulation of the Barb was down to the same 2000 copies Scherr had started with in 1965. The Barb finally folded in July, 1980.

Max Scherr died on October 31, 1981, of cancer.

== Legacy ==
Shortly before his death he told fellow underground newspaper editor Abe Peck: "We were a lot of well-meaning fools. All of us were tainted by the environment we were brought up in. We had no revolutionary base, no real class consciousness. Along with the good, we developed a large rip-off philosophy." But, he added, "we broke down a lot of barriers to honest thought and opened up a whole visionary realm of the future, which has to be worked on."
