= Eberl =

Eberl is a German surname. Notable people with the surname include:

- Anton Eberl (1765–1807), Austrian composer, teacher and pianist
- Elisabeth Eberl (born 1988), Austrian javelin thrower
- François Zdenek Eberl (1887–1962), Czech-born painter
- Irmfried Eberl (1910–1948), Austrian SS officer and commandant of Treblinka extermination camp
- Lucas Elliot Eberl (born 1986), American actor and director
- Max Eberl (born 1973), German footballer
- Roswitha Eberl, East German sprint canoer
- Ulrich Eberl (born 1962), German science and technology journalist

== See also ==
- Eberle (disambiguation)
