= Irmengarde Eberle =

American editor and children's literature author

Irmengarde Eberle (November 11, 1898 – February 27, 1979) was an American editor and writer of children's and young adult books. Throughout her life, she wrote 63 children's and young adult books. In addition to her own name, she wrote under the pseudonyms Phyllis Ann Carter and Allyn Allen.

== Life and career ==
Eberle was born as Louise Eberle on November 11, 1898 in San Antonio, Texas, to parents Mary Louise (née Perlitz) and Marcellus Eberle. Her mother died two months after she was born, and her father died six months later in an accident, leaving her and her two sisters. After their deaths, she and her siblings moved to the suburbs in San Antonio, where they were raised by their aunt, Anna Perlitz, and their grandmother, Frederika Romberg Perlitz. According to Eberle, she asked her aunt Caroline if she could be named Irmengarde after she heard the name mentioned in a Norse song, and her aunt accepted, since she was named after her then-deceased mother.

Eberle attended public schools in San Antonio. Her aunt Lina was a dean at the Texas State College for Women (TSCW) and later arranged for her and her sisters to attend the college. In 1916 or 1918, Eberle graduated from TSCW with a three-year degree in fine and applied arts.

After college, Eberle moved to New York and designed drapery fabric. She later switched careers when she decided to pursue her interest in writing. Eberle became a magazine editor, writing during her free time outside of work. Although not widely known, her first book was published in 1921 and was titled Picture Stories for Children. The book was in the format of a rebus and contained five stories, along with illustrations created by Eberle. In 1923, she was editor of the magazine Live Stories. From 1924 to 1926, she was an editor for the women's magazine Excella, and from 1927 to 1928, she was an editor for the New York Theatre Programs. While working as an editor, her writing was featured in Franklin P. Adams' column, The Conning Tower. In 1932, she became an editorial and publicity assistant at Alfred H. King Inc. Publishers.

In 1928, Irmengarde gave birth to a curly-haired boy named Paul. Out-of-wedlock birth was much more socially acceptable in 1928 than in the previous decades, but it must still have been daunting.

Eberle's second book, Hop, Skip and Fly, was published in 1937. After its success, she became a full-time writer. Alongside this, she was a contributing editor of the New York Woman magazine from 1937 to 1938. In 1937, her third book, Sea-Horse Adventure, was published.

In 1940, she was an editor for a Work Projects Administration project. In 1948, she reviewed children's books for the New York Herald.

Eberle wrote books about animals as part of her series titled "Lives Here", and she wrote about human-made materials in her series "New World".

In 1953, Eberle married Arnold Wolfgang Koehler Jr. Around 1955, her and her husband wrote The Golden Stamp Book of Napoleon as part of Simon & Schuster's Golden Stamp Books series. In 1956, she was selected as an officer of The Authors Guild, becoming the guild's secretary.

She died on February 27, 1979. Her work and other documents are held in the collections of the University of Minnesota, Minneapolis, University of Oregon, and University of Southern Mississippi.

== Selected works ==
- Picture Stories for Children (1921)
- Hop, Skip and Fly (1937)
- Sea-Horse Adventure (1937), illustrated by Else Winkler von Roeder Bostelmann
- Through the Harbor (c. 1939)
- A Good House for a Mouse (1940), illustrated by Eloise Wilkin
- Spice on the Wind (c. 1941)
- Phoebe-Belle (1941), illustrated by Fritz Eichenberg
- The Bands Play On (1942), written under pseudonym Phyllis Ann Carter
- Famous Inventors (c. 1942)
- Wild Fields (c. 1943)
- The Very Good Neighbors (1945), illustrated by Flora Nash DeMuth
- The Visiting Jimpsons (1946), illustrated by Ruth Kreps
- Lorie (1950)
- Rosemary's Secret (c. 1958), illustrated by Ursula Koering
- Robins on the Window Sill (c. 1958)
- Grasses (1960), illustrated by Ezra Jack Keats
- Fawn in the Woods (1962)
- The Racoon's Young Ones (c. 1963), illustrated by Lilian Obligado
- Mustang on the Prairie (c. 1968)
- Night Rovers (1969)
- Prairie Dog in Prairie Dog Town (1974)

=== Lives Here series ===
- Bears Live Here (1966)
- Chipmunks Live Here (1966)
- Foxes Live Here (1966)
- Koalas Live Here (c. 1967)
- Elephants Live Here (1970)
- Moose Live Here (1971)
- Beavers Live Here (1972)
- Pandas Live Here (1973)
- Penguins Live Here (1975)
