= Berkeley Barb =

1965-80 underground newspaper

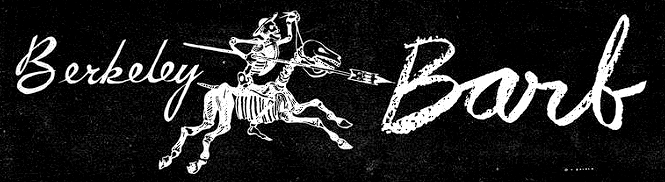

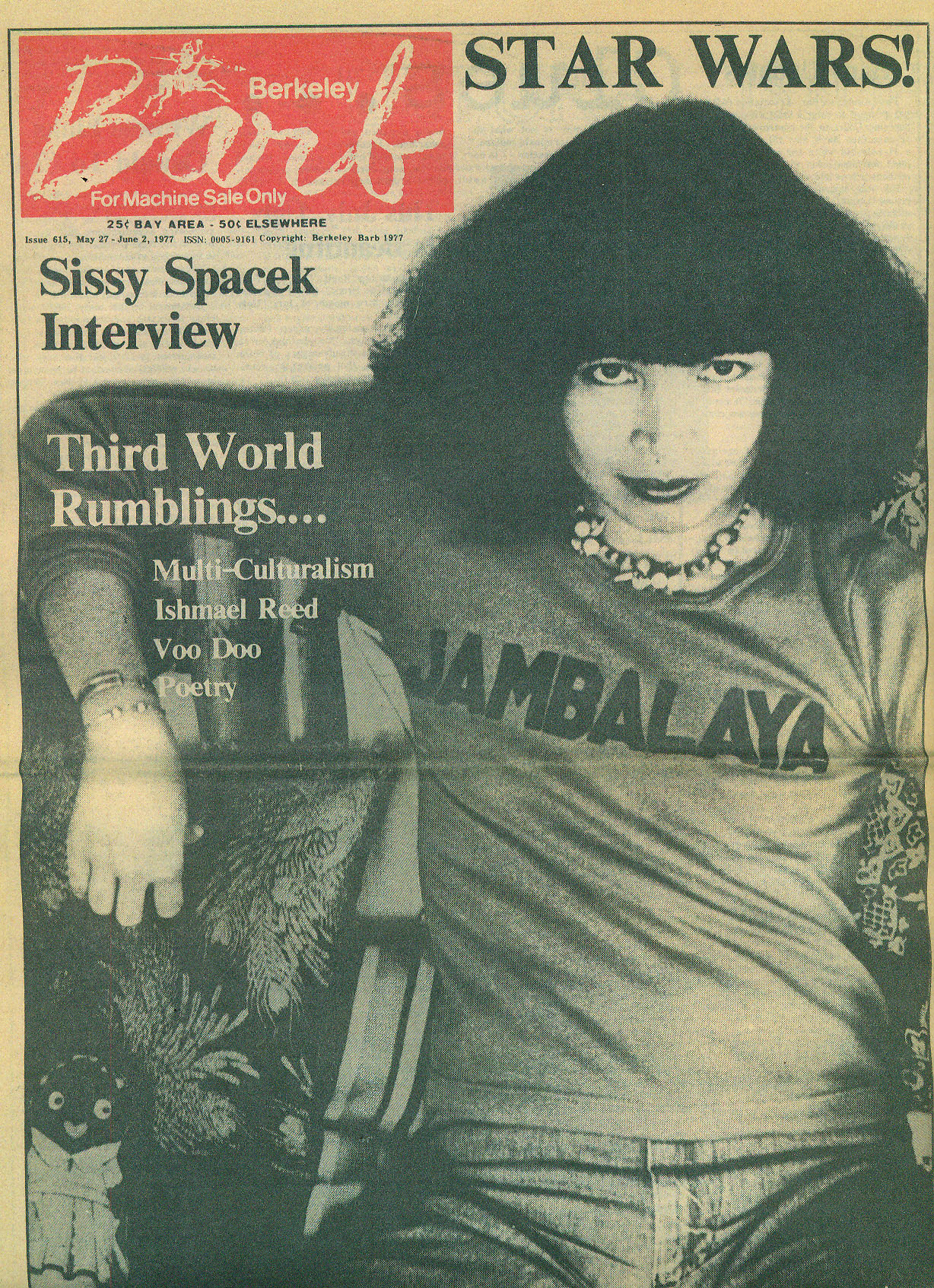
- A 1977 front cover of the Berkeley Barb
- Type: Weekly newspaper
- Format: Tabloid/Alternative newspaper
- Founder: Max Scherr
- Publisher: Max Scherr
- Founded: August 1965
- Ceased publication: 1980
- Headquarters: Berkeley, California
- Circulation: 85,000 (as of 1970)
- ISSN: 0005-9161
- Website: berkeleybarb.net

The Berkeley Barb was a weekly underground newspaper published in Berkeley, California, during the years 1965 to 1980. It was one of the first and most influential of the counterculture newspapers, covering such subjects as the anti-war movement and Civil Rights Movement, as well as the social changes advocated by youth culture.

== History ==
The newspaper was founded in August 1965 by Max Scherr, a middle-aged radical who had earlier been the owner of the Steppenwolf bar in Berkeley. Scherr was the editor and publisher from the newspaper's inception until the mid-1970s.

The Barb carried a great deal of political news, mainly concerning opposition to the Vietnam War and activist political events surrounding the University of California, particularly the Vietnam Day Committee and the Free Speech Movement. It also served as a venue for music advertisements. Starting around 1967, the Barb was the first underground paper to have an extensive classified ad section carrying explicit personal sex advertisements. Ultimately about a third of the paper was occupied by various forms of sexual advertising: as well as the personals there were ads for X-rated films, pornographic bookstores, mail order novelties and classifieds for models and massage, all both gay and straight. Photos of nude models spilled over into the news section. The formula of radical politics and sex worked, and the Barb was one of the top-selling underground papers in the nation. Efforts to clone this formula in other cities (e.g. Rat in New York City) ran into resistance from staff, readers and local authorities; female staffers and supporters from the Berkeley Tribe staged a sit-in at San Francisco's Dock of the Bay to successfully block publication of a proposed spin-off sex paper, and when male staffers at Good Times tried to put out a special "Sex" issue, women staffers stole the mock-ups and page layouts and burned them.

In 1969, under pressure from an underpaid and rebellious staff which believed, based primarily on information from an accountant, that Scherr was making windfall profits (the Barb may have been the only underground newspaper of which this could be said), Scherr sold the paper for $200,000 to Allan Coult, a professor of anthropology. The deal fell apart shortly afterwards and Scherr resumed ownership, cancelling the agreement after Coult failed to make the initial payment. At this point almost all of the 40 person staff, including managing editor James A. Schreiber, walked out and formed the "Red Mountain Tribe". After putting out a special Barb on Strike issue, they launched their own rival newspaper, the Berkeley Tribe, which soon claimed a circulation of 53,000 copies. Meanwhile, Scherr, who had locked the doors and then taken the files and equipment out of his own offices, continued publishing the Barb out of new offices with a new staff. The paper continued to be successful for a few years but the heyday of the underground press was passing. The Barb was caught up in the general downward trend, with contributor burnout and slowly falling circulation and ad revenues leading to a vicious circle of decline.

In 1978, with circulation down to 20,000 copies and dropping, the numerous sex ads were spun off into a separate publication, Spectator Magazine. Freed of the stigma of "adults only" but deprived of advertising income, the Barb went out of business within a year and a half. The final issue was dated July 3, 1980. Spectator Magazine ceased publication in October 2005.

== Underground comix ==
The Barb was one of the first papers to print underground comix, featuring Joel Beck's Lenny of Laredo in 1965; and later featuring the work of cartoonists such as Dave Sheridan and Bill Griffith ("Zippy the Pinhead" beginning in 1976).

== Banana skins and other hoaxes ==
In March 1967, Scherr, hoping to trick authorities into banning bananas, ran a satirical story which claimed that dried banana skins contained "bananadine", a (fictional) psychoactive substance which, when smoked, supposedly induced a psychedelic high similar to opium and psilocybin. The Barb may have been inspired by Donovan's 1966 song "Mellow Yellow", with its lyric "Electrical banana/Is gonna be a sudden craze". The hoax was believed and spread through the mainstream press, and was perpetuated after William Powell included it in The Anarchist Cookbook. A New York Times article on illicit drugs by Donald Louria, MD, noted in passing, that "banana scrapings, provide— if anything—a mild psychedelic experience". The Food and Drug Administration (FDA) investigated and concluded that banana skins were not psychedelic.

The Barb was itself subjected to hoaxes. At a memorial for the social activist and founder of the Yippies, Stew Albert, the following story was told:

One victim of an Albert prank was Max Scherr, editor of the Berkeley Barb, that legendary paper of the days of the Movement. "A lot of Jewish kids were converting to Buddhism then", Paul Glusman said, "so Albert cooked up a hoax, getting a letter mailed from Japan to the paper reporting that all the Buddhist kids in Japan were converting to Judaism". Scherr ran the letter.

== See also ==
- List of underground newspapers of the 1960s counterculture
