= Spectator Magazine =

American weekly news magazine

- Editor: Dave Patrick, Layne Winklebleck, Dara Lynne Dahl, Terry Hall
- Photographer: Dave Patrick & Layne Winklebleck
- Frequency: Weekly
- Format: Tabloid
- Circulation: 25,000
- Publisher: Sebago, Inc.; Bold Type, Inc.
- Founder: Max Scherr
- Founded: as Berkeley Barb, 1965
- First issue: 1978
- Final issue Number: October 2005; 1399
- Company: Sebago, Inc.; Bold Type, Inc.
- Country: United States
- Based in: Emeryville
- Language: English
- Website: Spectator.net
- ISSN: 0894-9751
- OCLC: 16387504

Spectator Magazine was an American weekly news magazine published in the San Francisco Bay Area from 1978 until October 2005.

== Precursor ==
=== Berkeley Barb ===
The publication originated from Berkeley Barb, an underground newspaper first published on August 13, 1965. The Barb was known for its coverage of free speech and libertarian values, including its acceptance of adult advertisements. In 1978, Berkeley Barb discontinued adult ads in an attempt to attract mainstream advertisers.

In response, the staff responsible for the adult advertising section created Spectator Magazine as an independent publication. The final issue of Berkeley Barb was published on July 3, 1980, following financial difficulties.

== Heyday ==
=== Uncensored sexual content and editorial features ===
During the early 1980s, Spectator Magazine was recognized for its uncensored advertisements and coverage of sexuality from a diverse perspective. The magazine included editorials, nude beach reports, event photography, and cover model layouts, with contributions from editor Dave Patrick.

=== Investigative reporting and activism ===
By the mid-1980s, in response to increasing censorship efforts, including the Meese Commission Report on Pornography, Spectator expanded its editorial focus to include investigative reporting on sexual issues. Contributors included David Steinberg, Carol Queen, Patrick Califia, Midori, and Bill Henkin. The magazine also engaged in activism, with staff members such as Miki Demarest, Kat Sunlove, and Layne Winklebleck playing roles in the defeat of California Senate Bill 5 (SB5), which aimed to redefine statewide obscenity standards.

=== City ban ===
In 1987, the City of Alameda attempted to ban Spectator news racks using zoning laws based on the Renton v. Playtime Theatres case. The magazine, supported by the ACLU and Californians Against Censorship Together (CAL-ACT), challenged the ordinance and won in both trial court and the California Court of Appeals (Sebago v. City of Alameda). A decision by the US Supreme Court in a similar Ohio case in June 1988 heralded the magazine's win.

=== Staff ownership ===
The magazine's owner, Sebago, Inc., offered to sell Spectator Magazine to its employees. The magazine was bought by its staff in November 1987. Eight staff members formed a new corporation, Bold Type, Inc., with Kat Sunlove as CEO and publisher. Under Sunlove’s leadership, the magazine expanded its revenue, reaching over $1 million annually. The magazine also organized community events, such as Sunlove’s 50th birthday gala at the Great American Music Hall in 1995, which raised funds for free speech advocacy groups.

=== Dual-edition model ===
In 1990, Assemblyman Gil Ferguson introduced a bill, AB 2023, to ban the sale of sexually explicit magazines from vending machines, which was opposed by the magazine. That bill failed but another bill was introduced later that year by Senator Ruben Ayala that passed committee.

In 1994, California enacted a law penalizing the distribution of “harmful matter” to minors, including unsupervised news rack distribution. Spectator Magazine, along with other publications, challenged the law in federal court. The U.S. Ninth Circuit upheld the law, and the Supreme Court declined to hear the case in 1997. In response, Spectator began publishing two versions: an R-rated edition for street distribution and an X-rated version for stores. This dual publishing model increased operational costs.

== Decline ==
=== Financial and legal difficulties ===
In 2002, financial difficulties led to the sale of Spectator Magazine to Dara Lynne Dahl, an exotic dancer, and W. Vann Hall, a photographer and software developer. The new owners aimed to revamp the magazine but faced significant financial and managerial challenges. During this period, the publication became involved in legal disputes with the rival publication Yank, which accused Spectator of unfair competition and vandalism of news racks. Spectator countersued, alleging similar actions by Yank. In 2004, San Mateo County Superior Court ruled in Spectator’s favor.

=== Closure ===
By 2003, Hall had stepped away from operations, leaving Dahl in executive control. Financial instability worsened, leading to a decline in circulation and advertising revenue. Failures to maintain business licenses and tax obligations further exacerbated the situation. Dahl later relocated to the United Kingdom. Dahl sold her ownership interest to Terry Hall (an experienced account executive) and Heath Weaver-Hall (an experienced media production professional). Despite efforts to revitalize the magazine, including increased community engagement and circulation improvements, financial difficulties proved insurmountable. In October 2005, Spectator Magazine ceased publication.
