= Jordan Eberle =

Canadian ice hockey player (born 1990)

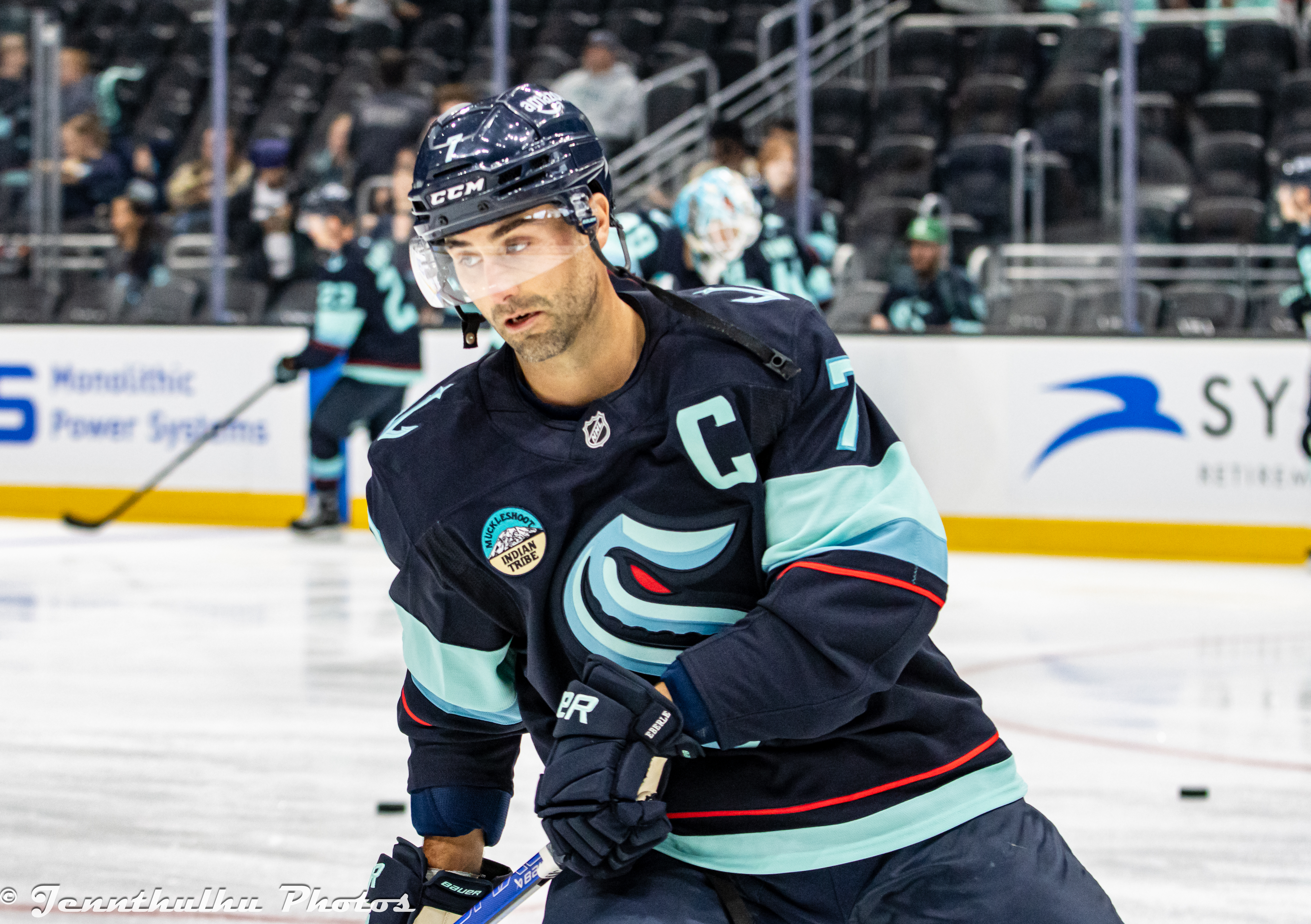
- Eberle with the Seattle Kraken in 2025
- Born: May 15, 1990 (age 36) Regina, Saskatchewan, Canada
- Height: 5 ft 11 in (180 cm)
- Weight: 180 lb (82 kg; 12 st 12 lb)
- Position: Right wing
- Shoots: Right
- NHL team Former teams: Seattle Kraken; Edmonton Oilers; New York Islanders
- National team: Canada
- NHL draft: 22nd overall, 2008; Edmonton Oilers
- Playing career: 2009–present

Jordan Leslie Christopher Eberle (/ˈɛbɜːrli/; born May 15, 1990) is a Canadian professional ice hockey player who is a right winger and captain of the Seattle Kraken of the National Hockey League (NHL). He was selected in the first round (22nd overall) in the 2008 NHL entry draft by the Edmonton Oilers and made his NHL debut with the Oilers in 2010.

During his four-year junior career with the Regina Pats of the Western Hockey League (WHL), he won the David Branch Player of the Year Award in 2010, the Doc Seaman Trophy as the scholastic player of the year in 2008 and was a two-time First Team East All-Star in 2008 and 2010. In his second season in the NHL, Eberle was named to the All-Star Game and led the Oilers in goals and points.

Internationally, Eberle has competed for Canada in two World Junior Championships, winning gold and silver in 2009 and 2010, respectively. He was named Tournament MVP and Best Forward at the 2010 World Junior Championships and is tied with Brayden Schenn as Canada's third all-time leading scorer at the tournament with 26 points. In 2012, The Sports Network named him the best Canadian World Junior player ever.

== Early life ==
Eberle was born on May 15, 1990, in Regina, Saskatchewan, to Darren and Lisa Eberle. His dad coached him on his minor hockey teams growing up. He has two older sisters, Ashley and Whitney, a younger brother, Dustin and an older brother Christopher. He attended high school at the Athol Murray College of Notre Dame in Wilcox, Saskatchewan, before moving to Calgary, Alberta, at age 15 with his parents and three siblings. He returned to Regina to play junior hockey for the Regina Pats and attended Archbishop M.C. O'Neill High School during the hockey season. He went on to graduate from Bishop O'Byrne Senior High School in Calgary in June 2008.

== Playing career ==
=== Early career ===
Eberle played novice hockey with Hockey Regina's tier-1 Kings and amassed 216 goals over sixty games in 1999–2000. He then went on to play Bantam AAA hockey for the Athol Murray College of Notre Dame at the age of 14. During the 2004–05 season, Eberle scored 40 goals and 27 assists through 27 games. He was then selected by his hometown major junior team, the Regina Pats of the Western Hockey League (WHL), in the seventh round (126th overall) of the 2005 WHL bantam draft. Following the draft, Eberle joined the midget ranks with the Calgary Buffaloes of the Alberta Midget Hockey League (AMHL). He scored 14 goals and 34 points through the 2005–06 season and described his success as "a microcosm of the team’s." He won a bronze medal with the Buffaloes at the 2006 Mac's Midget Hockey Tournament, scoring two goals in the bronze-medal game against the Prince Albert Mintos. He helped his team qualify for the 2006 Telus Cup national midget championship, where the Buffaloes lost a 5–4 triple-overtime game in the final against the Mintos. Eberle scored a goal and an assist in the losing effort and was awarded the Most Sportsmanlike Award for the tournament.

=== Major junior ===
Eberle debuted with the Pats in the 2006–07 season, scoring 55 points and a team-high 28 goals as a rookie. He added two goals and seven points in six games against the Swift Current Broncos in the opening round of the 2007 WHL playoffs but was sidelined for the entirety of the second round against the Medicine Hat Tigers due to a virus. Eberle started his second major junior season by earning WHL Player of the Month honours for October 2007, totalling 16 goals and 26 points over 16 games for the Pats. He missed two games early in the season with tonsillitis, before scoring a hat-trick in his return on October 6, 2007, against the Moose Jaw Warriors. Eberle scored a goal while representing Team WHL against Russia in the 2007 ADT Canada-Russia Challenge to help his team secure a 4-2 series win. Midway through the season, he was chosen to compete in the 2008 CHL Top Prospects Game in Edmonton.

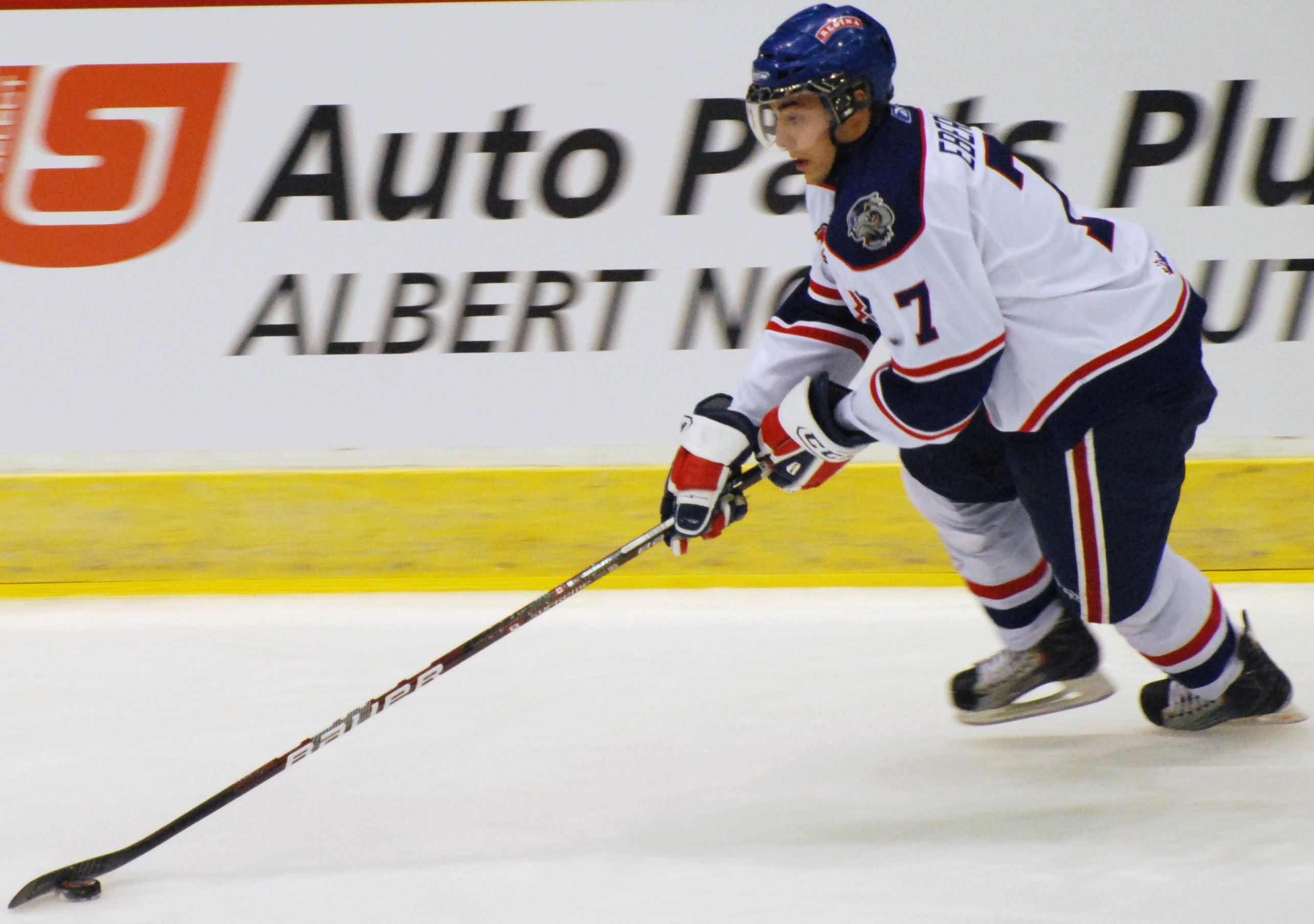
Eberle with the Pats during the 2009–10 season

Eberle finished the 2007–08 season with a team-high 42 goals and 75 points. His 42 goals accounted for one-fifth of his team's scoring and marked the first time a Pats player hit the forty-goal mark since Matt Hubbauer scored 48 in 2001–02. He also tied Drayson Bowman of the Spokane Chiefs for fourth in league scoring. He was selected to the WHL East First All-Star Team and received the Doc Seaman Trophy as WHL Scholastic Player of the Year.

Eberle had started the season ranked seventh among WHL skaters in the NHL Central Scouting Bureau's preliminary rankings for the 2008 NHL entry draft. At the midpoint of the season, he was ranked 24th among North American skaters, but he was dropped to 33rd in the NHL's final rankings. The Sports Network described Eberle as the "smartest offensive players in the draft." During the season, Eberle competed in his second ADT Canada–Russia Challenge for Team WHL in 2008. He was selected in the first round, 22nd overall, by the Edmonton Oilers. Having grown up in Regina, Eberle was a childhood fan of the Oilers, even after his family moved to Calgary. After completing the 2008–09 WHL season with a team-leading 74 points in 61 games, Eberle was signed to a three-year, entry-level contract with the Oilers on March 23, 2009.

Eberle was one of the final cuts of the Oilers' 2009 training camp, and he was returned to the Pats on September 27, 2009. After being sent down, Eberle reeled off 25 points in 12 games to be named WHL Player of the Month for September and October. He was named to Team WHL for the 2009 Subway Super Series (formerly known as the ADT Canada–Russia Challenge) and was selected as an alternate captain to Pats teammate Colten Teubert for Game 5. Eberle finished the 2009–10 WHL season second in league scoring with 106 points in 57 games (one point behind Brandon Kozun of the Calgary Hitmen in eight fewer games) and was a unanimous selection to his second WHL East First All-Star Team in three years. He was the first member of the Pats to score 50 goals and record 100 points since Ronald Petrovicky during the 1997–98 season. Eberle finished his career with the Pats seventh all-time in franchise goal scoring with 155 and 12th in points with 310. Eberle was named the Regina Pats Player of the Year, Most Sportsmanlike Player and the Most Popular player after the 2009–10 season. Eberle was selected as the winner of the Four Broncos Memorial Trophy as WHL Player of the Year, defeating Western Conference nominee Craig Cunningham of the Vancouver Giants. He was later named CHL Player of the Year, beating out the Ontario Hockey League (OHL) and Quebec Major Junior Hockey League (QMJHL) nominees Tyler Seguin and Mike Hoffman, respectively. It marked the third time that a Pats player won the award, after Ed Staniowski in 1975 and Doug Wickenheiser in 1980.

In recognition of his outstanding junior hockey career, the Pats retired Eberle's number 7 on December 5, 2012.

=== Professional ===
==== Edmonton Oilers ====
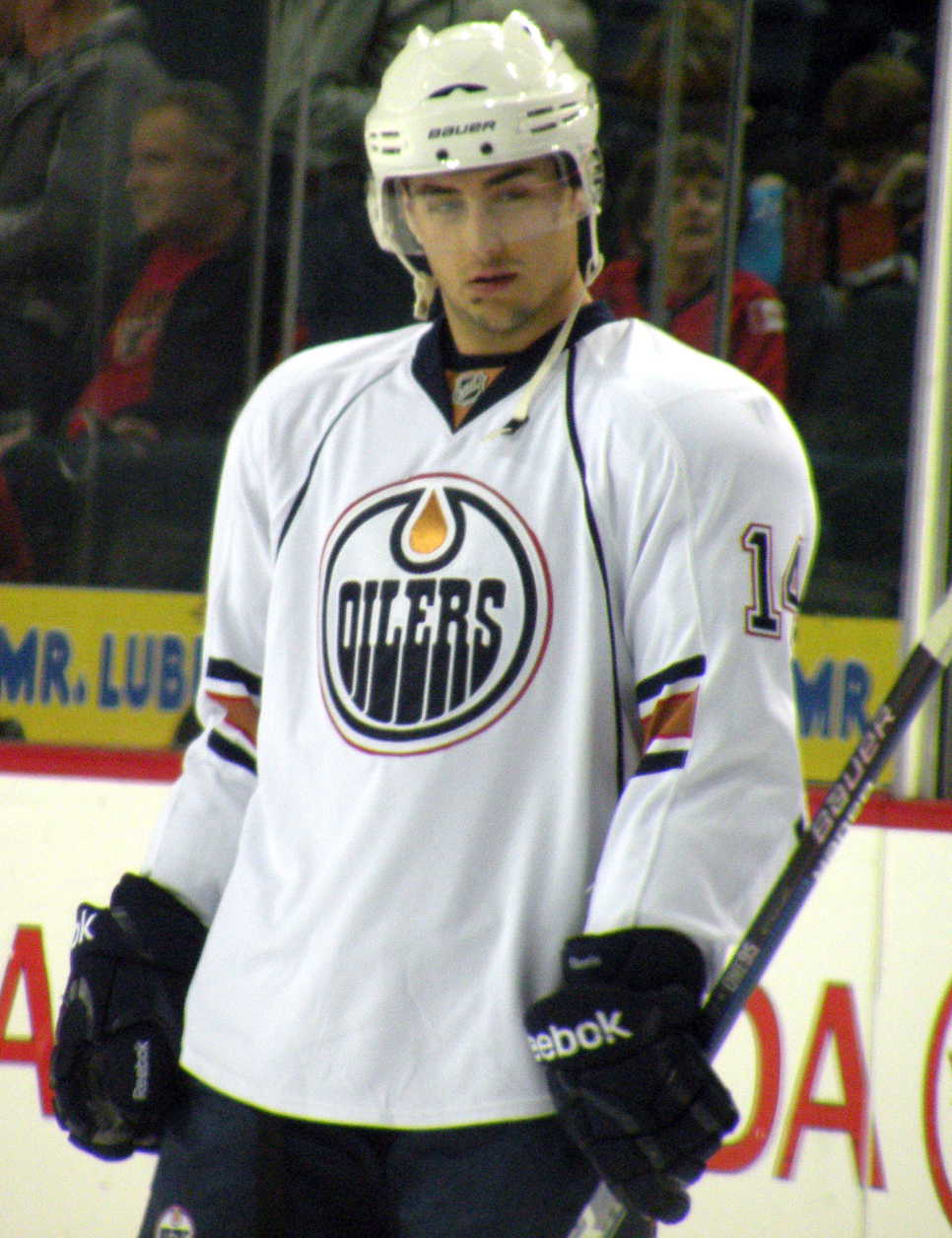
Eberle in October 2010

Soon after signing a contract with the Oilers, Eberle was assigned to their American Hockey League (AHL) affiliate, the Springfield Falcons, for the remainder of the 2008–09 season. He made his professional debut for the Falcons on March 27, 2009, against the Worcester Sharks. By his third AHL game, he had tallied two assists through two games. He then scored his first professional goal in his third game with the Falcons, a 4–3 loss to the Portland Pirates, on March 29. Eberle continued to produce and finished the regular season with nine points through nine games. Following his time in the AHL, Eberle again attended the Oilers training camp and preseason games before being reassigned to the WHL for the 2009–10 season. Coach Pat Quinn stated that Eberle was reassigned to allow him to grow and strengthen his skills and attitude. Following another outstanding WHL season, Eberle returned to the Falcons' for the last few games of the regular season. He finished the Falcons' 2009–10 season with 14 points through 11 games.

During the 2010 off-season, the Oilers signed Eberle's former Canadian junior national team teammate Taylor Hall to an NHL contract. They subsequently attended the Oilers' Development Camp together in the summer of 2010. They were also one of 16 forwards named to the Oilers Young Stars roster for their tournament against the Vancouver Canucks, Anaheim Ducks, Calgary Flames, and San Jose Sharks Eberle then attended his third Rookie Camp with the Oilers, where the team announced that Eberle would wear the number 14 while playing for the Oilers. (Note: His WHL number (7) had already been retired by the Oilers organization) After impressing during rookie camp, Eberle was named to the Oilers opening night roster for the 2010–11 season. He subsequently made his NHL debut with the Oilers on October 7, 2010, against the Calgary Flames. During the game, he recorded his first NHL goal in the third period and later added an assist on the power play to lead the team to a 4–0 win. The goal was later voted by fans as the NHL's Goal of the Year on the league's Facebook page, as well as Play of the Year on The Sports Network's (TSN) website. Early into his rookie season, Eberle was playing on a line with Shawn Horcoff and Taylor Hall while on pace for 50 points. By January 1, he had accumulated nine goals and 14 assists through 36 games before suffering a high ankle sprain during a game against the Flames. While sidelined with the injury, he underwent an unrelated emergency appendectomy. He ended up missing a month before being able to return to the Oilers' lineup. Upon returning from the surgery, Eberle recorded two-assists in their 5–3 loss to the St. Louis Blues. Later, in April, Eberle received a hit to the head from opposing forward Raffi Torres. While Eberle was not injured on the play, Torres received a four-game suspension for the hit. Though the Oilers finished with the worst record in the NHL for the second straight year, Eberle finished the season with 18 goals and 25 assists for 43 points through 69 games.

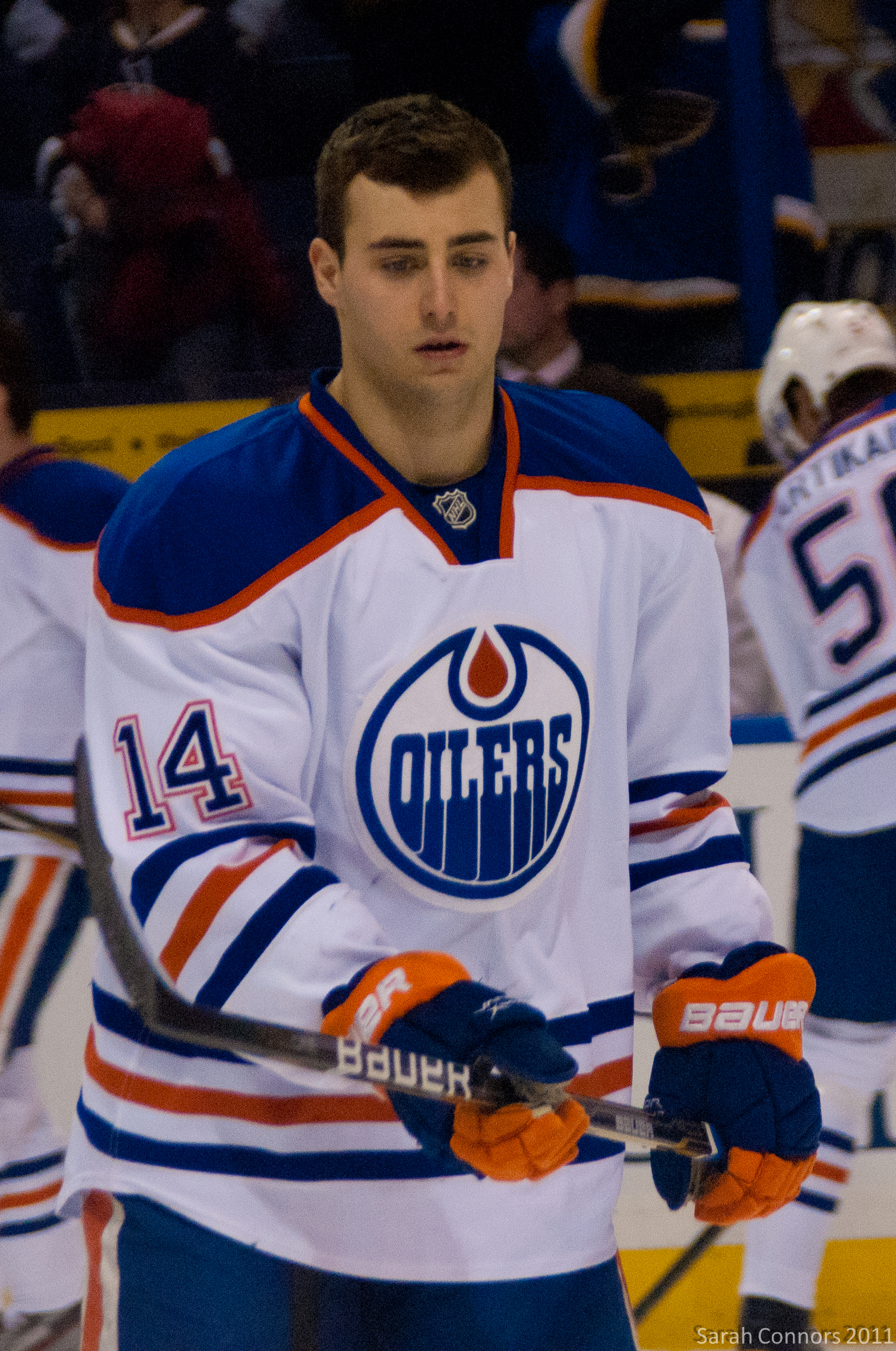
Eberle during his sophomore season with the Oilers in 2012

Eberle began the 2011–12 season on the Oilers' top line with Taylor Hall and Ryan Nugent-Hopkins. By the end of October, the trio had combined for 10 goals and 26 points, while the rest of the team combined for only seven goals and 22 points. In part due to the trio's efforts, the Oilers began the season with 9–3–2 record and placed first in the Northwest Division by November 10. As such, Eberle and Hall were named as eligible players for the 2012 NHL All-Star Fan Ballot. By mid-December, Eberle ranked seventh in league scoring with 11 goals and 31 points through 29 games. However, his success was short-lived as he sustained a sprained knee after colliding with Dallas Stars forward Jamie Benn during a game on January 7, 2012. At the time of the injury, Eberle was among the league's top scorers and six points behind the league's leader. Despite his success, he was left off the 2012 NHL All-Star Game roster, which was selected while he was sidelined. Several members within the Oilers organization were outspoken regarding the omission, including captain Shawn Horcoff and head Coach Tom Renney, to which the League replied that Eberle would have been selected had he not been injured. Eberle returned to the Oilers lineup after missing four games and was later named as an All-Star replacement for the injured Mikko Koivu. Almost a month later, Eberle recorded his 100th career NHL point on February 21, 2012, with a goal and two assists in a 6–1 victory over the Calgary Flames. On February 23, Eberle tallied two points in a 2–0 win over the Philadelphia Flyers. He subsequently became the first Oiler to hit 60 points in 56 or fewer games since Doug Weight in 2000–01. He was also considered an early favourite for the Lady Byng Memorial Trophy as the league's most gentlemanly player as he recorded eight penalty minutes over 57 games. Despite his breakout season, the Oilers continued to struggle and were 26th overall in five-on-five scoring in early March. On March 14, Eberle tallied 67 points in 67 games to become the only Western Conference player in the top-20 in league scoring that was averaging a point-per-game. Four days later, he hit the 70-point plateau for the first time in his NHL career as the Oilers fell to the Phoenix Coyotes. By the end of March, Eberle ranked 11th among NHL scorers, with 32 goals and 41 assists for 73 points through 73 games. He subsequently finished his sophomore season with a team-leading 34 goals and 42 assists for 76 points through 77 games. On April 23, 2012, Eberle was nominated for the Lady Byng Memorial Trophy as the league's most gentlemanly player, but lost to Brian Campbell.

Before the start of the 2012–13 season, Eberle signed a six-year, $36 million contract extension with the Oilers on August 30, 2012. However, due to the 2012–13 NHL lockout, Eberle was reassigned to the Oilers' new AHL affiliate, the Oklahoma City Barons until the lockout was resolved. Eberle matched his previous season's success, albeit at the AHL level, and was named the AHL Player of the Month for both November and December. The December honours were earned by leading all AHL skaters in scoring for the second consecutive month with 11 goals and nine assists for 20 points through 11 games, including two hat tricks and six multiple-point games. Once the lockout was resolved, Eberle left as the AHL's leading scorer with 25 goals and 51 points in 34 games. Upon re-joining the Oilers, Eberle quickly became tied for the team lead in points with five. While playing on the Oilers top line with Hall and Nugent-Hopkins, the trio combined to record 19 shots as the Oilers set a new franchise record for shots on goal with 56 against the Colorado Avalanche. However, the line was soon split up as they struggled to score while playing five-on-five. They were reunited for a short while as the season reached its end. Eberle finished the 2012–13 shortened season with 16 goals and 21 assists for 37 points through 48 games. His 16 goals were second-best behind Hall's and his 37 points ranked him third on the Oilers in scoring.

During the 2013 off-season, the Oilers hired Dallas Eakins as their 12th head coach in franchise history and Nugent-Hopkins suffered a shoulder injury after signing an extension to remain with the team. While Nugent-Hopkins was out of the lineup, his linemates Hall and Eberle led the team in scoring for the month of October. However, Hall suffered a knee injury once Nugent-Hopkins returned at the end of October and Nail Yakupov replaced him on the first line. As Eberle struggled to produce throughout November, including experiencing an eight-game scoring drought, rumours began to spring about trade offers with the Philadelphia Flyers. Both Eberle and the Oilers struggled as the season continued and by December 9 they had fallen to 27th place in the standings. As a result of their poor performance, Eberle continued to be named in trade rumours ahead of the 2014 trade deadline. After missing an early January game due to a knee injury, Eberle was reunited with Hall and Nugent-Hopkins while Yakupov joined David Perron. Upon returning to his former line, Eberle began picking up goals and quickly tied his longest goal-scoring streak of the season. By January 22, he had accumulated 18 goals and ranked second on the team in scoring behind team co-leaders Perron and Hall. At the end of January, Eberle tallied his 200th and 201st career NHL points by scoring a goal and an assist in a 3–0 win over the San Jose Sharks. Although Eberle would miss another game in March due to his knee injury, he continued to have a productive season. While playing alongside Hall and Nugent-Hopkins, Eberle quickly eclipsed his 60-point total for just the second time in his career. In early April, the trio combined for 22 points over four games leading Eberle to have accumulated 27 goals and 37 assists for 64 points through 77 games. Although he would add one more goal before the season concluded, the Oilers again failed to qualify for the 2014 Stanley Cup playoffs.

Prior to the start of the 2014–15 season, the Oilers named Eberle an alternate captain alongside Hall. Despite being among the youngest on the team, Eakins praised their leadership qualities shown during the season and training camp. While the Oilers began their preseason play, Eakins added newly drafted Leon Draisaitl onto Eberle's line along with David Perron in an effort to boost their production. On November 14, Eberle tallied his 100th career NHL goal in a 4–3 overtime loss to the Ottawa Senators. As the Oilers continued to struggle to win games, Eakins was replaced with Todd Nelson in mid-December. Under his new head coach, Eberle tallied his 250th career NHL point on January 20 and tied with Nugent-Hopkins and Hall for the team lead in scoring. Although the Oilers continued to fall in the standings, Eberle led the team with 15 goals and 36 points through the first 54 games of the season. He continued to improve throughout February and quickly accumulated three goals and 12 assists for 15 points over 15 games. Through the latter half of the 2014–15 season, Eberle consistently played alongside Benoît Pouliot and Nugent-Hopkins. From March 8 to March 21, Eberle maintained a seven-game point streak which included five goals and seven assists. During this streak, he also led the team, having three power-play goals and 10 power-play assists since the 2015 NHL All-Star Game break. Eberle also recorded his 56th point of the season which pushed him into a tie for 30th in NHL scoring. On March 30, he played his 350th career NHL game. Despite his personal accomplishments, the 2014–15 season was one of the poorest in franchise history as the Oilers finished with 62 points.

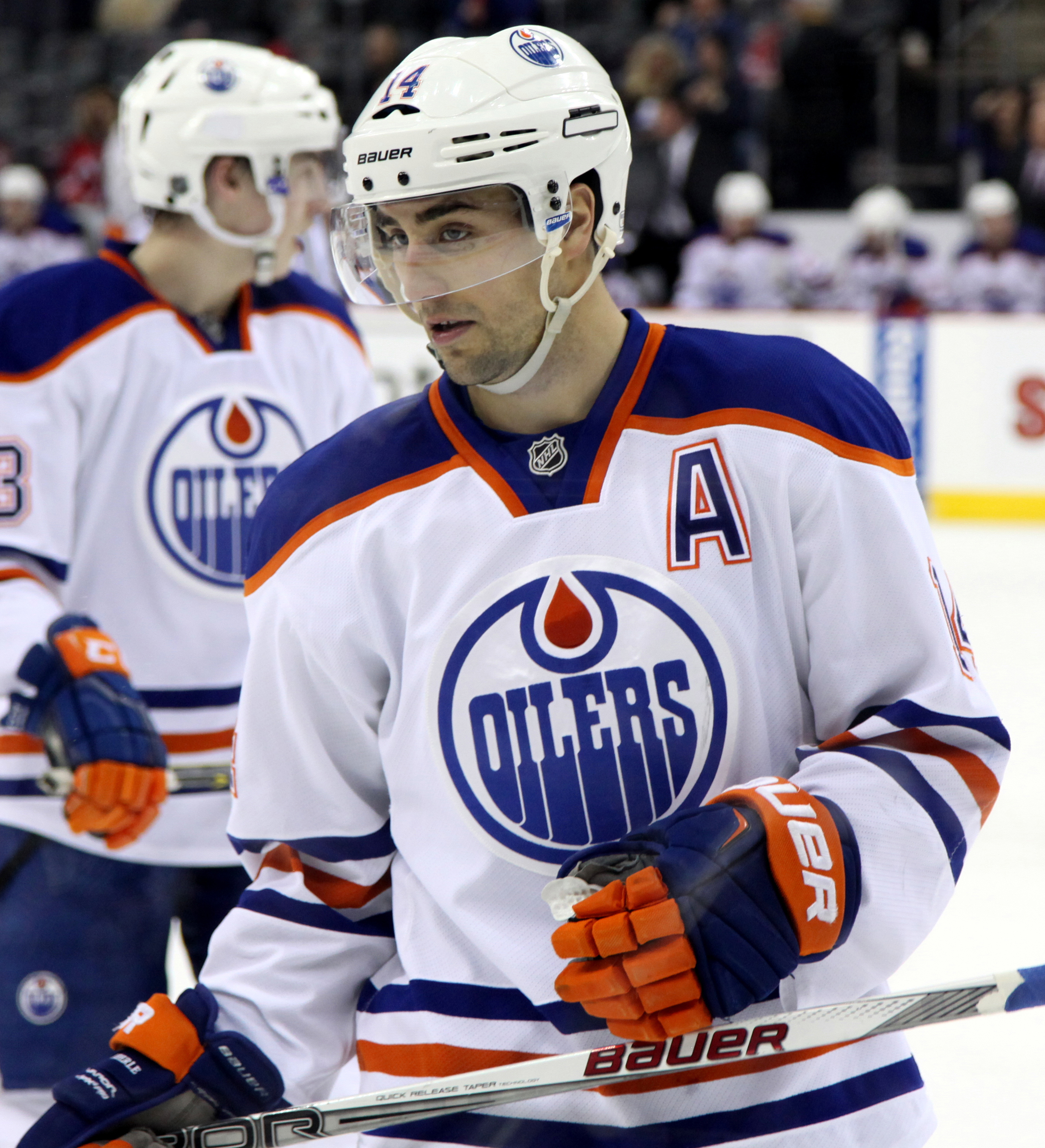
Eberle in February 2015

During the 2015 offseason, Eberle represented Team Canada at the 2015 IIHF World Championship before returning to the Oilers for the 2015–16 NHL season. After tallying one goal and one assist in four preseason games while playing alongside Nugent-Hopkins and Pouliot, Eberle suffered a shoulder injury during a game against the Arizona Coyotes. He was expected to miss the first four to six weeks of the season to recover. During his absence, rookie Connor McDavid suffered a broken clavicle resulting in Draisaitl being called up to join Hall and Nugent-Hopkins on the Oilers' top line. Eberle subsequently missed the first 13 games of the 2015–16 season before returning to the Oilers lineup on November 8 for their game against the Pittsburgh Penguins. Although he quickly tallied his first goal of the season during a 4–2 loss to the Chicago Blackhawks, Eberle struggled to readjust to the NHL's fast pace. As the Oilers fell to 30th place in the standings, Eberle also experienced a five-game goalless drought at the end of November. Despite his slow start, Eberle broke out offensively during the second half of the season and quickly began tallying points. On January 2, he scored two goals, including the game-tying goal, to reach 130 goals and 300 points in his NHL career. Once McDavid returned from his injury in early February, he joined Eberle and Pouliot on the Oilers' second line. Prior to McDavid's return, Eberle had tallied three goals over 18 games. In their first game together, the three forwards combined for seven points and three of the Oilers five goals in their 5–1 win over the Columbus Blue Jackets on February 2. The following week, the trio combined for 13 points in their 5–2 win over the Toronto Maple Leafs on February 11, 2016, as Eberle also recorded his first career NHL hat-trick. Although Yakupov soon replaced Pouliot due to an injury, the line continued to score. During a game against the Philadelphia Flyers, the trio contributed eight of the Oilers' 14 shots in the opening period as they outshot the Flyers 14–6. Eberle hit the 40-point plateau while McDavid picked up his 32nd point in 29 games, and Yakupov earned his sixth goal and 16th point of the season. Once the Oilers traded for Patrick Maroon, the former joined Eberle and McDavid's line and the three immediately became a success. Despite their continued losses, coach Todd McLellan praised the trio as the team's best line. Eberle finished the season with 25 goals, 11 power-play points, and 173 shots on goal. However, he still finished the regular season with his lowest total in a full NHL season since his rookie campaign as the Oilers once again failed to qualify for the Stanley Cup playoffs.

Following another low-scoring season, Eberle hired a shooting coach over the offseason to work on his one timer and overall shooting skills. Upon returning to the Oilers for the 2016–17 season, Eberle was again named an alternate captain as McDavid, who was named captain, became the youngest in NHL history. In the first game of the 2016 preseason, Eberle reunited with McDavid and newcomer Milan Lucic on the Oilers top line. They combined for seven shots-on-goal in their debut together. Their success continued into the regular season as the Oilers went undefeated through the first two games of the season. Eberle also began the season with a five-game point streak including three goals and three assists. Despite this, the team continued to struggle early in the season and Eberle and McDavid were reunited with Maroon in early November as the team attempted to stop a three-game losing streak. Once Eberle was reunited with Maroon, he maintained a three-game point-scoring streak and tallied seven points over six games. By November 17, McDavid and Eberle were tied for the team lead with five goals while Maroon led the team with six. Eberle also led the team with 51 shots on net, which ranked him 19th overall in the league. After being called out by the coach for his poor performance, Eberle was demoted to the Oilers' third line. While he was on the third line, Eberle was replaced by rookie Jesse Puljujarvi on McDavid's right wing.

During his time on the second line, Eberle experienced a nine-game goalless drought. By the time he was reunited with McDavid and Lucic in mid-December, Eberle had tallied eight goals and 15 assists to rank among the top four in scoring for the Oilers. Eberle was again moved from McDavid's wing in January and played on the right side of Drake Caggiula, with Pouliot on the left. Eberle continued to struggle to remain consistent and experienced a career-high 18-game goalless streak which he snapped on January 18, 2017. As a result of his poor performance in January, he had again been demoted to the third line. Once Eberle snapped his goalless drought, he quickly accumulated three goals and three assists over the next six games. However, he would then experience an eight-game point drought which was snapped on February 16. Despite his personal inconsistencies, the Oilers maintained a 31–19–8 record with 24 games remaining in the season. In Eberle's 501st regular-season game on March 28, the Oilers qualified for the Stanley Cup playoffs for the first time since their 2006 Stanley Cup Finals run. Eberle finished the regular season with 20 goals and 51 points after he recorded his second career hat-trick in the Oilers' final regular season game on April 10.

Eberle played in his first NHL playoff game on April 12, 2017, in Game 1 of the Western Conference first-round against the San Jose Sharks. Eberle assisted on Oscar Klefbom's goal in his debut, which would prove to be the only Oilers goal of the game. He played on the Oilers second line alongside Milan Lucic and Nugent-Hopkins, but only Lucic recorded a goal over the six-game series. Eberle led the Oilers with four shots and three hits over six games as they advanced to the second round. However, he continued to struggle to score and was called out by head coach Todd McLellan for his lack of production and his tentativeness to play in high-risk areas. When the Oilers were eliminated by the Ducks in Game 7, Eberle finished the postseason with only two assists. Following their elimination, Eberle spoke about how his lack of confidence affected his performance in the playoffs.

==== New York Islanders ====
Following the Oilers' elimination from the 2017 playoffs, Eberle was traded to the New York Islanders in exchange for Ryan Strome on June 22, 2017. Eberle left the Oilers organization with a total of 165 goals and 217 assists through 507 games. Following the trade, Eberle revealed that he had struggled mentally with the Oilers' lack of success and was appreciative for the trade. Upon joining the Islanders, Eberle was expected to start the 2017–18 NHL season as the top-line right wing alongside John Tavares and Anders Lee. While on this line, Eberle led the team in assists with six through their first nine games to help the team maintain a 5–3–1 record. However, after going goalless in his first 10 games, coach Doug Weight moved Eberle onto a line with rookie center Mathew Barzal. By the time Eberle faced the Oilers on November 7, he had accumulated four goals and seven assists through 14 games, including two multipoint games. He continued to score while playing on the Islanders' second line and quickly maintained a six-game goal streak. By the quarter-way mark into the season, Eberle had become a mainstay on Barzal's line as the Islanders maintained a 12–7–2 record with 26 points. Following a win over the Washington Capitals on December 11, Eberle became the eighth Islander to reach double-digit assists during the 2017–18 season. Later in the month, Eberle assisted on all three of Barzal's goals as Barzal became the first Islander rookie since Michael Grabner to record a hat-trick. Eberle, Barzal, and Andrew Ladd were steady linemates through the first half of the season before Ladd suffered an injury in early January. Once Anthony Beauvillier returned to the Islanders in January after a stint in the AHL, he joined Barzal and Eberle on the Islanders second line. While playing with Beauvillier and Barzal on January 13, Eberle recorded a career-high four assists in one game as the Islanders topped the New York Rangers. Over the course of three games with Beauvillier and Barzal, Eberle recorded three assists while Barzal tallied 10 points and Beauvillier accumulated five. Eberle later reached the 20-goal mark for the 6th time in his career during a 3–0 shutout of the Rangers on February 15. Eberle missed his first game with the Islanders on March 2 due to lingering soreness from a previous game. As such, he lost his iron man streak, having played 142 straight games. Eberle returned to the lineup the following game but the Islanders continued their six-game losing streak. By March 7, Eberle had tallied 23 goals and 24 assists for 47 points through 66 games. Eberle finished his first season with the Islanders with 25 goals and 34 assists for 59 points as the team failed to qualify for the 2018 Stanley Cup playoffs.

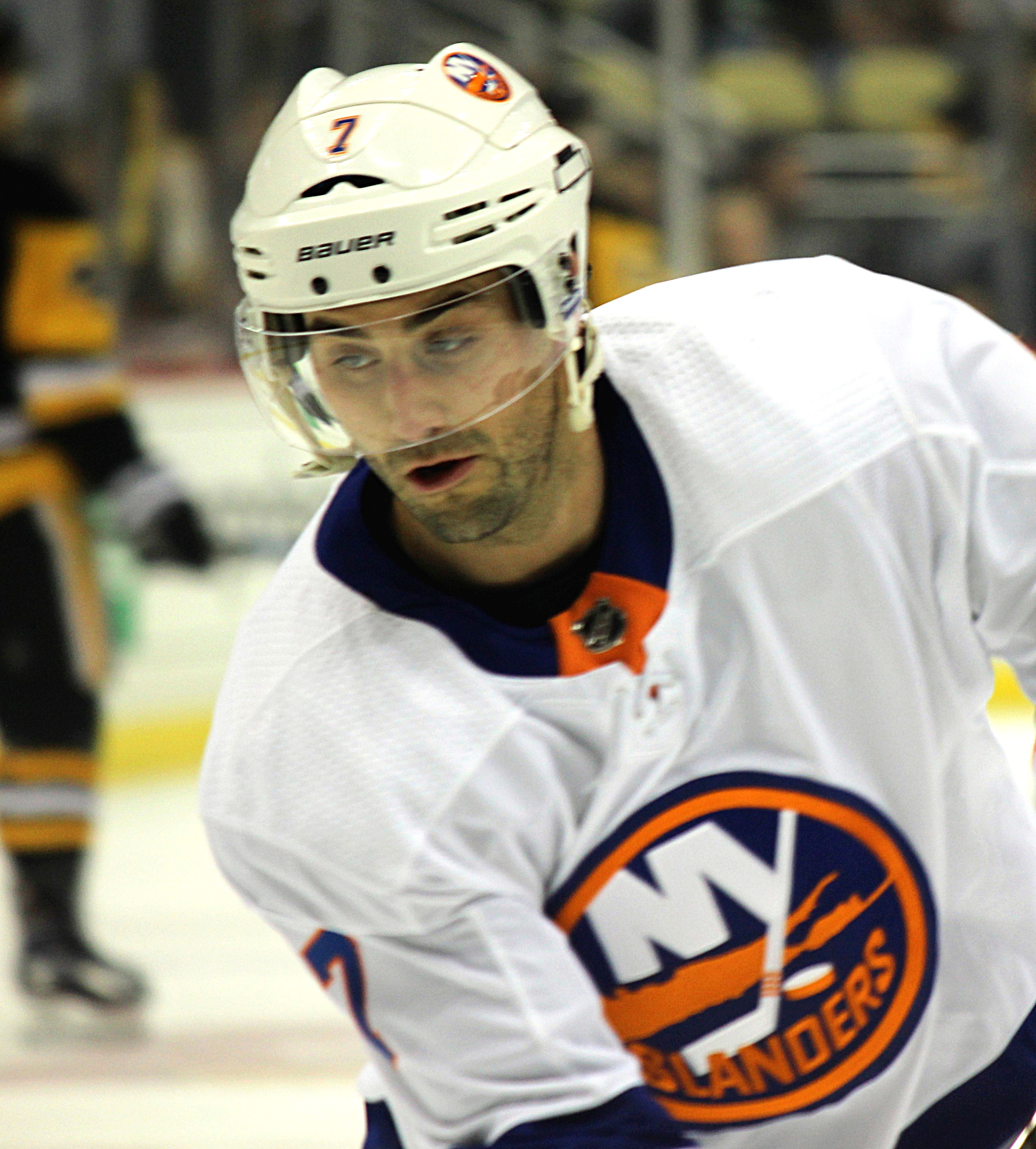
Eberle with the Islanders in 2018

During the 2018 off-season, the Islanders underwent numerous important changes. Head coach Doug Weight was replaced with Barry Trotz and captain John Tavares left the team as an unrestricted free agent. Eberle entered the 2018–19 season in the final year of his contract but was adamant he was focusing on hockey instead of contract discussions. Due to Tavares' departure, Eberle, Barzal, and Lee were expected to become the Islanders' new top line. However, Trotz re-designed the top-six so that Eberle was partnered with Lee and Brock Nelson on the second line while Barzal joined Josh Bailey and Beauvillier on the top line. Eberle struggled to build chemistry with his new linemates and failed to produce at the same level as the previous season. He experienced an 18-game goalless drought before being moved to Barzal's line with Anders Lee in mid-March. Upon rejoining his former linemates, the three forwards produced 22 points over 12 games. As a result of their ongoing success, the Islanders clinched a berth in the 2019 Stanley Cup playoffs for their first postseason appearance since 2016. When speaking about the success of the top line, Eberle said: "Since they put me, [Barzal], and [Lee] together the puck has been going in a lot more. I don’t know what we finished the season with, but it seemed like we scored every game." Eberle concluded the season scoring five goals through the final seven games while the top line trio outscored opponents by a 6–2 margin in more than 122 minutes of 5-on-5 hockey. Despite finishing the season strong, Eberle still recorded only 19 goals and 18 assists for 37 points, his fewest since the 2012–13 season. In contrast to his playoff performance in Edmonton, Eberle was a major contributor to the Islanders' sweep of the Pittsburgh Penguins in the first round of the playoffs. He finished the playoffs with nine points in eight games. Once the Islanders were eliminated, Eberle opted to sign a five-year contract extension with the Islanders on June 14, 2019.

During the 2019 offseason, Eberle trained in Calgary with various other hockey players including Mike Green and Maxime Lajoie. Upon returning to the Islanders for the 2019–20 season, Eberle, Barzal, and Lee reunited as the Islanders top line. Eberle recorded three assists through his first five games before suffering an injury on October 12. He eventually returned to the Islanders lineup after missing 10 games for their 2–1 win over the Florida Panthers on November 9. Eberle later broke his 14-game goalless drought by tallying two goals in their 4–1 win over the Detroit Red Wings on December 2. In his 700th-career NHL game on January 13, Eberle scored his fifth goal of the season and added an assist in the Islanders 6–2 loss to the Rangers. The following day, he recorded his 500th and 501st career NHL points in the Islanders 8–2 win over the Detroit Red Wings. The following month, Eberle recorded his third career NHL hat-trick to lift the Islanders over the Detroit Red Wings on February 21. Following his hat-trick, Eberle and Barzal each maintained a point streak of five games. Eberle's point streak included five goals and two assists. In March, the trio combined for 32 points through 10 games before the NHL paused play due to the COVID-19 pandemic. When the NHL paused play, Eberle was fifth in Islanders scoring with 16 goals and 24 assists for 40 points through 58 games.

After four months, the Islanders returned to play for the qualifying round of the 2020 Stanley Cup playoffs against the Florida Panthers. Eberle, Barzal, and Lee combined to score three goals in four games to help the team eliminate the Panthers. During Game 1 of their first-round matchup against the Washington Capitals, Eberle scored the Islanders' second goal late in the second period to help lift the team to an eventual 4–2 win. After the Islanders eliminated the Capitals in five games, they met the Philadelphia Flyers in the Eastern Conference second round. During the series, the trio of Barzal, Eberle, and Lee were on the ice for 33 high-danger chances for and only 14 against at five-on-five. Eberle ended the series by accumulating six assists while Lee had four goals and Barzal had six points. When the Islanders faced the Tampa Bay Lightning in the Eastern Conference Final, Eberle had accumulated three goals and eight assists for 11 points throughout the postseason. On September 15, 2020, Eberle scored his first playoff overtime winner against in double overtime to stave off elimination and force a Game 6.

==== Seattle Kraken ====
After being left unprotected by the Islanders, Eberle was selected by the Seattle Kraken at the 2021 NHL expansion draft on July 21, 2021. Leading up to their inaugural 2021–22 season, Mark Giordano was named the inaugural captain of the Kraken on October 11, and Eberle, Jaden Schwartz, Adam Larsson, and Yanni Gourde were named alternate captains. Eberle was quickly assigned to be a top line winger alongside Schwartz and Jared McCann. Eberle began the season on a goalless streak before scoring the first hat trick in franchise history on November 4, 2021, to lift the Kraken over the Buffalo Sabres. He subsequently became the ninth NHL player to score a natural hat trick for an expansion team in its inaugural season. Following the hat-trick, Eberle continued to produce as he led the Kraken with six goals through 12 games. Within the next three games, he added two goals to lead the Kraken with eight goals and 12 points in 15 games. During the Kraken's seven-game point streak in November, Eberle scored 10 points before the Kraken then lost six straight games. Eberle later missed two games to recover from an injury but returned for the Kraken's 6–1 loss to the Pittsburgh Penguins on December 6. Despite missing numerous games, Eberle continued to lead the team in scoring with 12 goals while Jaden Schwartz led with 13 assists. While Yanni Gourde and Riley Sheahan were in the NHL's COVID protocol, McCann joined Schwartz and Eberle as part of the Kraken's top six forward lines. However, Schwartz was replaced with Marcus Johansson in January after he suffered a hand injury. With his new linemate, Eberle continued to lead the team with 23 points while also recording the second best goal scoring rate of his career. He also blocked 20 shots through 33 games, on pace to surpass his career high set during the 2013–14 season. Eberle's efforts were recognized league-wide with a selection for the 2022 National Hockey League All-Star Game. On February 5, Eberle become the first Kraken to score in an NHL All-Star Game although the Pacific Division would fall 6–4 to the Metro Division. He also participated in the NHL Fountain Faceoff competition where he fired pucks into five targets floating in the Fountains of Bellagio. Upon returning from the All-Star Game, Eberle's offensive talent decreased and he finished the season with nine goals over the final 56 games. Although he hit the 20-goal milestone for the sixth time in his career, the Kraken failed to qualify for the 2022 Stanley Cup playoffs.

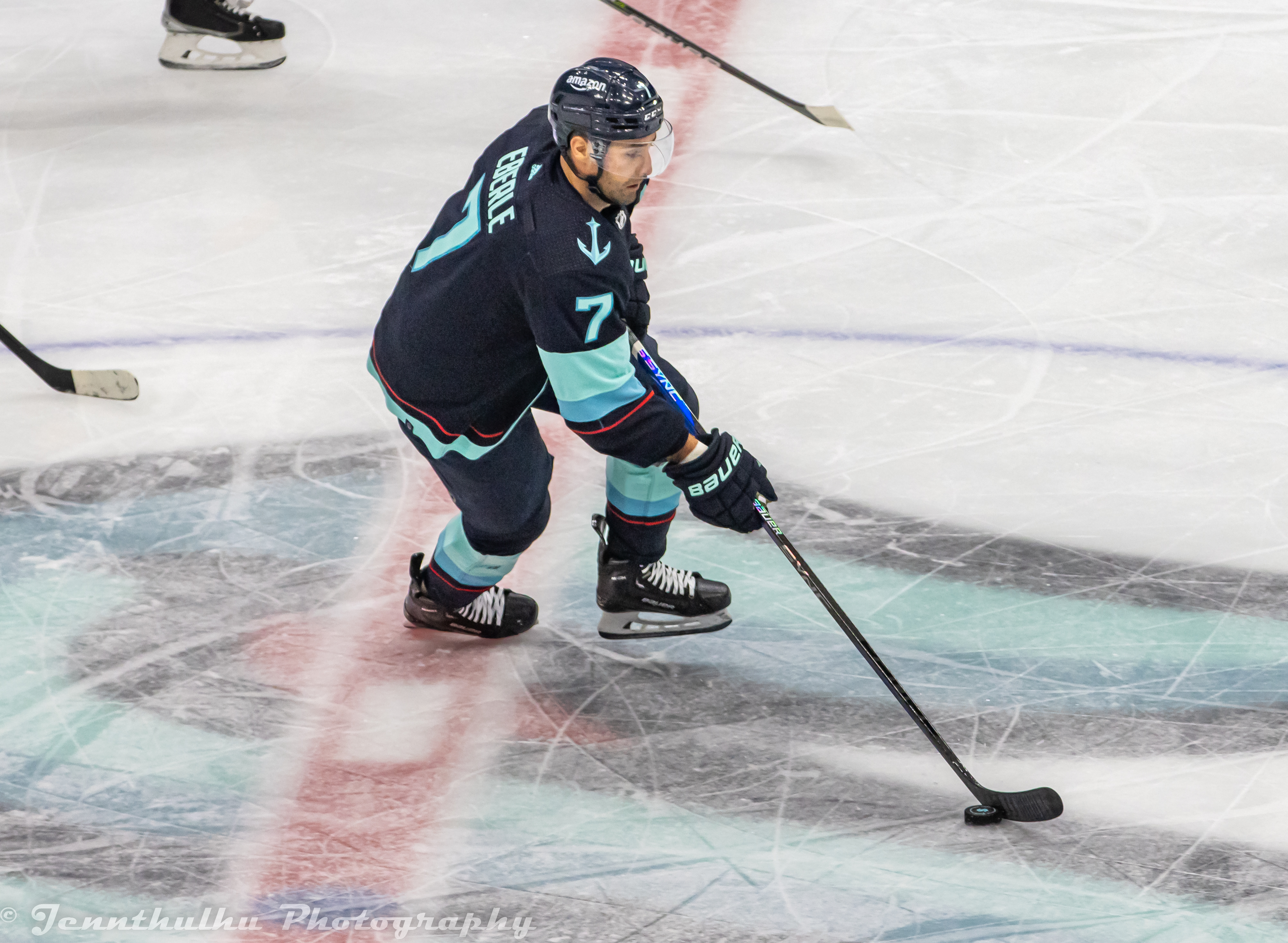
Eberle with the Kraken in November 2022

Following a disappointing inaugural season, Eberle returned to the Kraken for the 2022–23 season as an alternate captain for the second straight year. Eberle reunited with McCann and rookie Matty Beniers as the Kraken's top offensive unit as the Kraken rebounded from their previous season. Although Eberle scored his first goal of the season on October 30, the line helped the Kraken maintain a 4–4–2 record going into November. The trio also helped the team maintain a lengthy point streak through October and November. During this time, Eberle tallied six goals over 11 games and record a total of 15 points to rank second on the team. From November 13 to the start of December, Eberle's line outscored opponents 10–2, outshot them 58–41, and out-chanced them 53-34 while playing at even-strength. By December 2, the team had maintained a franchise-best six-game win streak and a 14–5–3 record. The line continued to be effective throughout December and they helped generate 60.8-percent of all shot quality. On January 14, 2023, Eberle tallied an assist in his 900th career NHL game as the Kraken maintained an eight-game point streak. Eberle was recognized as the Second Star of the Week ending on April 9 after he tallied eight points over four games. His efforts helped the Kraken clinch the first playoff berth in franchise history. During their first round series against the Colorado Avalanche, Eberle recorded the first overtime playoff goal in franchise history to win Game 4 and tie their series 2–2. However, during the game, the Kraken lost McCann to injury and replaced him on Eberle's line with Tye Kartye. The trio of Eberle, Kartye, and Beniers remained together through their series against the Avalanche and against the Dallas Stars.

Eberle began the 2023–24 season reunited with McCann and Beniers on the Kraken's top line and power play unit. He accumulated one goal and three assists over his first 13 games of the season before suffering a cut to his leg from a skate blade during practice. As a pending unrestricted free agent, there was speculation as to whether Eberle would be traded leading up to the 2024 NHL trade deadline. On March 8, 2024, he signed a two-year, $9.5 million contract extension with Seattle. A few days later, on March 12, Eberle played in his 1,000th career NHL game against the Vegas Golden Knights. The traditional awarding of the silver stick as well as other gifts was saved for the Kraken's March 14 game against the Washington Capitals.

On October 8, 2024, at the start of the 2024–25 season, Eberle was named the second captain in Kraken history, filling the vacancy left by Mark Giordano. He played 16 games, recording six goals and five assists, before suffering an injury on November 14 against the Chicago Blackhawks. As a result of the injury, he underwent pelvic surgery and was expected to miss three months. Eberle returned to the Kraken lineup on February 22.

On March 6, 2026, the Kraken and Eberle agreed to a two-year, $11 million contract extension, with Seattle citing Eberle as a leader of the franchise.

== International play ==
Medal record

Ice hockey

Representing Canada

World Championships
Gold medal – first place	2015 Czech Republic	

World Junior Championships
Gold medal – first place	2009 Canada	
Silver medal – second place	2010 Canada	

IIHF World U18 Championships
Gold medal – first place	2008 Russia	

Representing Alberta

Canada Winter Games
Bronze medal – third place	2007 Canada	

Eberle represented Alberta at the 2007 Canada Games in Whitehorse, Yukon. He notched two goals and an assist in the bronze medal game against British Columbia in Alberta's 4–3 win. He finished the tournament with six goals and five assists in five games played to place eighth in tournament scoring. Several months later, Eberle played for Team Canada's under-18 team at the 2007 Ivan Hlinka Memorial Tournament, but failed to register a point as Canada was kept from a medal. He continued with the national under-18 team the following year at the 2008 IIHF World U18 Championships in Russia. He began the tournament by earning player of the game honours with a two-goal effort in the first round-robin game against Germany—a 9–2 win for Canada. He later notched two goals and an assist in an 8–0 gold medal game win to help Canada to their first tournament championship in five years. As a result, Eberle was named one of Canada's Top Three Players of the tournament.

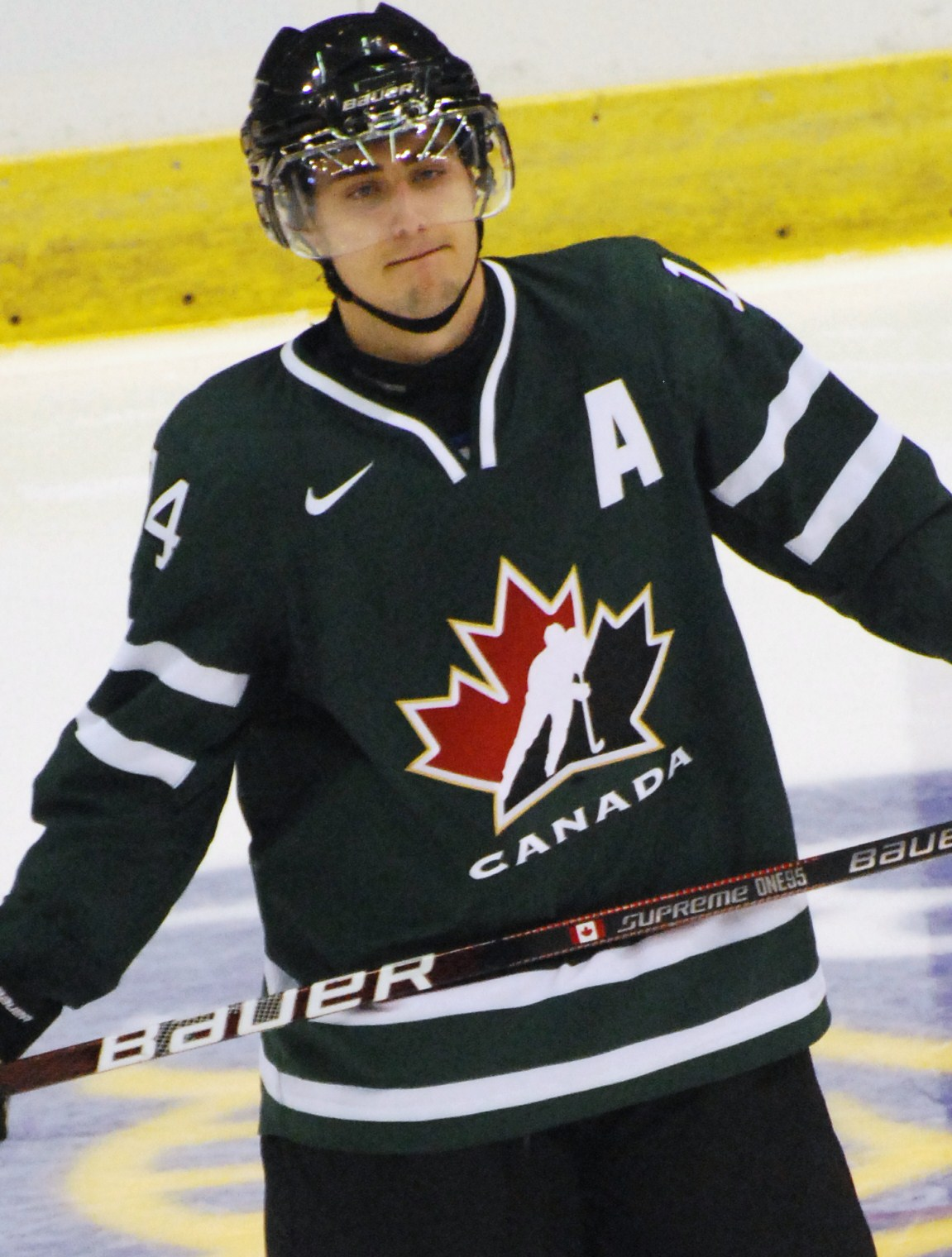
Eberle with Team Canada in 2009

In his third WHL season, Eberle was selected to the Team Canada's under-20 team for the 2009 World Junior Championships in Ottawa, Ontario. In the semi-finals, on January 3, 2009, Eberle was named player of the game after scoring two goals and the shootout-winner against Russia in a 6–5 win. Eberle dramatically scored his second goal of the night with just 5.4 seconds left in regulation to force extra time and the eventual shootout, in which he shot first and scored. Defeating Sweden 5–1 in the final, Eberle helped Canada to a record-tying fifth straight gold medal and was named by the coaching staff as one of the team's best three players. At the conclusion of the tournament, Eberle was third in tournament scoring with 13 points (six goals, seven assists).

The following year, Eberle was named to his second national junior team for the 2010 World Junior Championships in his hometown Regina, Saskatchewan. He was selected as an alternate captain to Patrice Cormier along with fellow returnees Colten Teubert, Alex Pietrangelo and Stefan Della Rovere. He made an immediate impact on the team by scoring one goal and four assists in their second round robin game against Switzerland. Two games later, he scored two goals in regulation and one in the shootout against the United States in the final game of the round-robin to earn his second player of the game honour of the tournament. Canada later met the United States again in the gold medal game. Down 5–3 with three minutes to go in regulation, Eberle scored twice to force overtime. His tying goal with 1:35 left made him Canada's all-time leading goal scorer in the tournament with 14 goals, passing John Tavares' mark set the previous year. Canada eventually lost in overtime, earning silver and ending their five-year gold medal streak. At the conclusion of the tournament, Eberle finished tied for the tournament lead in goals with André Petersson of Sweden and was second in points to Derek Stepan of the United States. He was voted as the Most Valuable Player and Top Forward. He was also named to the tournament All-Star Team by the media and named one of Canada's top three players by the coaches. Three days after the gold medal game, Regina Mayor Pat Fiacco proclaimed January 8, 2010, as "Jordan Eberle and Colten Teubert Day" in the city for their efforts in the tournament.

On April 16, 2010, Eberle was named to Team Canada as an alternate for the 2010 IIHF World Championship held in Germany. After injuries to Ryan Smyth and Steven Stamkos in the preliminary round, he debuted with Canada's men's team on May 14, 2010, against Norway. Eberle scored a goal and assisted on three others to earn the Player of the Game Award in a 12–1 Canadian victory. He played in three more games without any points as Canada finished in seventh place with a loss to Russia in the quarter-final.

Following his NHL rookie season, Eberle joined the Canadian men's team for the second consecutive year for the 2011 IIHF World Championship in Slovakia. During the preliminary round, Eberle scored a goal in a contest against Switzerland to be named player of the game. In a game against the United States during the qualifying round, Eberle scored in a shootout, helping Canada to a 4–3 win, while also temporarily tying them for the lead in their pool. Canada went on to top their pool, but lost 2–1 in the quarter-final against Russia for the second consecutive year. Scoring four times over seven tournament games (no assists), Eberle tied for second in team goal-scoring, behind John Tavares. In 2012, The Sports Network named him the best Canadian World Junior player ever as he held the longest scoring streak in Team Canada history.

At the 2015 World Championships, where Canada won the gold medal for the first time since 2007 with a perfect 10–0 record, Eberle finished second in scoring with 5 goals and 8 assists, one point behind tournament leader Jason Spezza.

== Personal life ==
Eberle has a cousin, Derek Eberle, who also played junior for the Pats from 1990 to 1993. His brother Dustin was drafted by the Pats in the 12th round, 248th overall, of the 2007 WHL Bantam Draft.

Eberle has been in a relationship with Lauren Rodych since high school. They became engaged in the summer of 2016. The couple got married on July 22, 2017, in Calgary, Alberta. As of November 2026, they have five children together, three sons and two daughters. In 2022, Eberle and his wife founded the Sticks and Strings Foundation, a charitable organization supporting youth literacy, childhood sports, music and nature.

== Career statistics ==
=== Regular season and playoffs ===
			Regular season					Playoffs
Season	Team	League	GP	G	A	Pts	PIM	GP	G	A	Pts	PIM
2005–06	Calgary Buffaloes	AMHL	31	14	20	34	6	11	7	1	8	8
2006–07	Regina Pats	WHL	66	28	27	55	32	6	2	5	7	2
2007–08	Regina Pats	WHL	70	42	33	75	20	5	2	4	6	7
2008–09	Regina Pats	WHL	61	35	39	74	20	—	—	—	—	—
2008–09	Springfield Falcons	AHL	9	3	6	9	4	—	—	—	—	—
2009–10	Regina Pats	WHL	57	50	56	106	32	—	—	—	—	—
2009–10	Springfield Falcons	AHL	11	6	8	14	0	—	—	—	—	—
2010–11	Edmonton Oilers	NHL	69	18	25	43	22	—	—	—	—	—
2011–12	Edmonton Oilers	NHL	78	34	42	76	10	—	—	—	—	—
2012–13	Oklahoma City Barons	AHL	34	25	26	51	10	—	—	—	—	—
2012–13	Edmonton Oilers	NHL	48	16	21	37	16	—	—	—	—	—
2013–14	Edmonton Oilers	NHL	80	28	37	65	18	—	—	—	—	—
2014–15	Edmonton Oilers	NHL	81	24	39	63	24	—	—	—	—	—
2015–16	Edmonton Oilers	NHL	69	25	22	47	14	—	—	—	—	—
2016–17	Edmonton Oilers	NHL	82	20	31	51	16	13	0	2	2	2
2017–18	New York Islanders	NHL	81	25	34	59	21	—	—	—	—	—
2018–19	New York Islanders	NHL	78	19	18	37	17	8	4	5	9	2
2019–20	New York Islanders	NHL	58	16	24	40	12	22	5	9	14	10
2020–21	New York Islanders	NHL	55	16	17	33	16	19	4	7	11	4
2021–22	Seattle Kraken	NHL	79	21	23	44	14	—	—	—	—	—
2022–23	Seattle Kraken	NHL	82	20	43	63	34	14	6	5	11	6
2023–24	Seattle Kraken	NHL	78	17	27	44	17	—	—	—	—	—
2024–25	Seattle Kraken	NHL	42	9	17	26	14	—	—	—	—	—
2025–26	Seattle Kraken	NHL	80	26	29	55	28	—	—	—	—	—
NHL totals			1,140	334	449	783	293	76	19	28	47	24

=== International ===
Year	Team	Event	GP	G	A	Pts	PIM
2007	Canada	IH18	4	0	0	0	2
2008	Canada	WJC18	7	4	6	10	0
2009	Canada	WJC	6	6	7	13	2
2010	Canada	WJC	6	8	5	13	4
2010	Canada	WC	4	1	3	4	0
2011	Canada	WC	7	4	0	4	0
2012	Canada	WC	8	4	4	8	0
2013	Canada	WC	8	0	5	5	2
2015	Canada	WC	10	5	8	13	0
2018	Canada	WC	10	2	3	5	2
Junior totals			23	18	18	36	8
Senior totals			47	16	23	39	4

== Awards ==
Award	Year	Ref
Major junior
WHL Player of the Month	2007, 2009	
WHL East First All-Star Team	2008, 2010	
Doc Seaman Trophy	2008	
Four Broncos Memorial Trophy	2010	
CHL Player of the Year	2010	
Retired number	2012	
NHL
NHL All-Star Game	2012, 2022	
AHL
CCM/AHL Player of the Month	2012 (November and December)	
International
World Junior Top Three Player on Team Canada	2009, 2010	
World Junior All-Star Team	2010	
World Junior Best Forward	2010	
World Junior MVP	2010	
Other
Saskatchewan Sport Male Athlete of the Year	2010	

== Records ==
=== Edmonton Oilers ===
- Most career shootout goals (20)

=== Seattle Kraken ===
==== Regular Season ====
- Most career game-winning goals (13, tied with Jared McCann)
- Most career overtime goals (3, tied with 4 others)
- Most career shootout shot attempts (17)
- Most goals in a game (3, tied with 4 others)
- Most assists in a game (4, tied with Chandler Stephenson)
- Most points in a game (4, tied with 5 others)

==== Postseason ====
- Most career goals (6)
- Most goals in a postseason (6, in 2023)
- Longest goal scoring streak (3 games, in 2023)

== Notes ==
Awards and achievements
Preceded by Keith Aulie	Daryl K. (Doc) Seaman Trophy; 2008	Succeeded by Stefan Elliott
Preceded by John Tavares	World Junior Best Forward; 2010	Succeeded by Brayden Schenn
Preceded by John Tavares	World Junior MVP; 2010	Succeeded by Brayden Schenn
Preceded by Brett Sonne	Four Broncos Memorial Trophy; 2010	Succeeded by Darcy Kuemper
Preceded by Cody Hodgson	CHL Player of the Year; 2010	Succeeded by Ryan Ellis
Preceded by Riley Nash	Edmonton Oilers first-round draft pick 2008	Succeeded by Magnus Paajarvi-Svensson
Sporting positions
Preceded by Mark Giordano	Seattle Kraken captain 2024–present	Incumbent
