= Eugene A. Eberle =

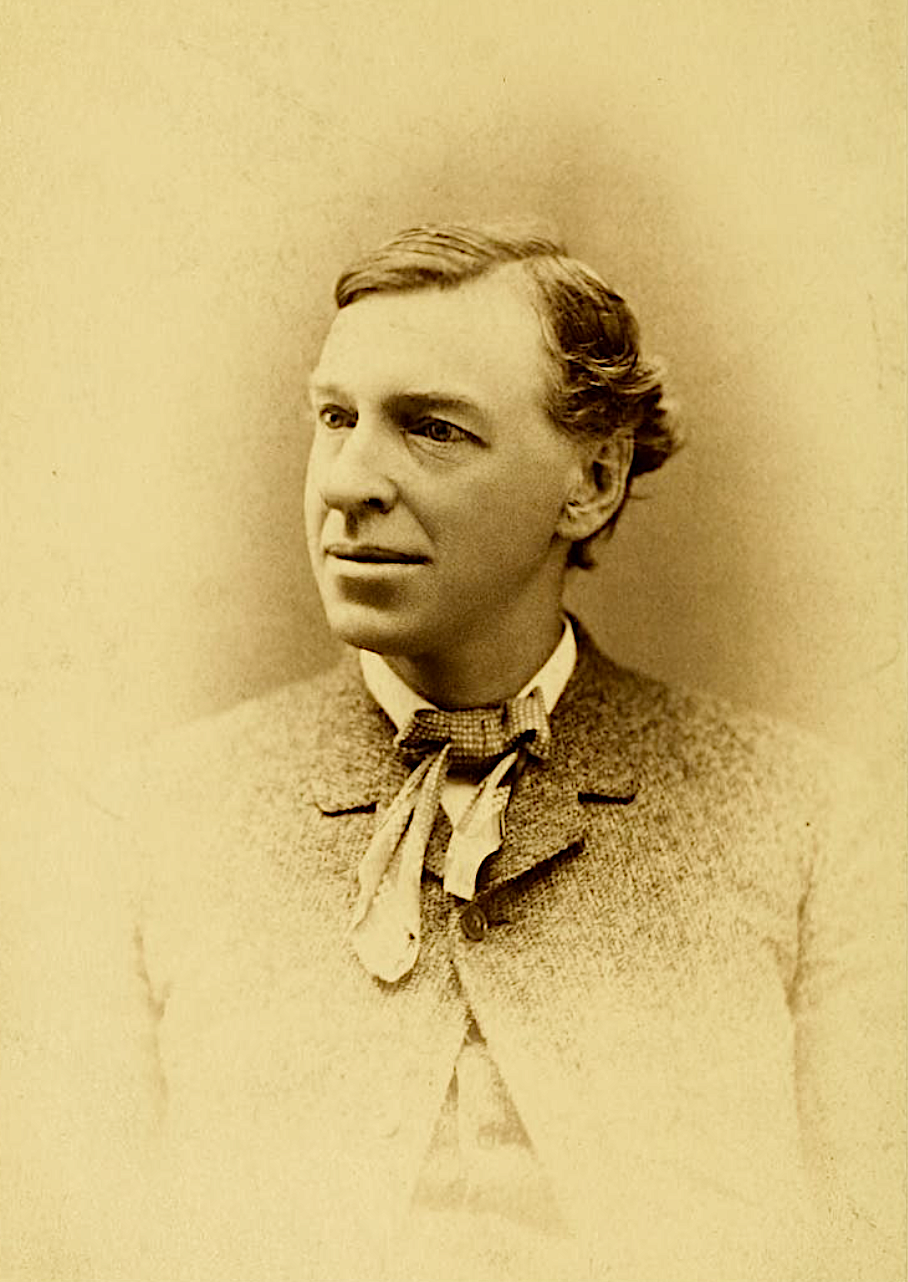
Eugene A. Eberle

Eugene A. Eberle (1840–1917) was a Broadway actor who appeared in over 60 productions, including Edwin Booth's Hamlet in 1864–65, in which he played the gravedigger.

Born in Bangor, Maine, Eberle made his debut as Paris in a Bangor production of Romeo and Juliet. By the early 1900s he was in the touring company of acclaimed actor Otis Skinner. His wife, Mary Tyrell (1841-1919), (who performed on stage as Mrs. E. A. Eberle) was a sixty-year veteran of the American Stage They celebrated their 50th Year Wedding Anniversary in 1917.

Eberle's father Charles L. Eberle was a native of Philadelphia, and also an actor. His mother was Rachel Apherton, a descendant of Gen. Humphrey Apherton. The senior Eberle was killed on board the steamboat "Lexington" when it was burned on Long Island Sound. The younger Eberle was educated in the schools of Boston. He was married to Mrs. Mary Tyrell, of Scotland, also an actress.

Eberle died on October 23, 1917 in Chatham, New York.
