= Eberly =

Eberly is a surname. Notable people with the surname include:

- Andrew Eberly, American politician
- Angelina Eberly (1798–1860)
- Bob Eberly (1916–1981), American singer
- Don Eberly (born 1953), American writer
- George A. Eberly (1871–1958), American judge from Nebraska
- Janice Eberly (born c. 1964), American economist
- Joseph H. Eberly (1935–2025), American physicist
- Lynn Eberly (fl. 1990s–2010s), American statistician
- Robert E. Eberly (1918–2004), American chief executive

== See also ==
- Eberle
- Everly (disambiguation)
