= Derek Eberle =

Canadian ice hockey player

- Born: July 18, 1972 (age 54) Regina, Saskatchewan, Canada
- Height: 5 ft 10 in (178 cm)
- Weight: 205 lb (93 kg; 14 st 9 lb)
- Position: Defence
- Shot: Left
- Played for: New Jersey Rockin' Rollers
- Playing career: 1996–1996

Derek Eberle (born July 18, 1972) is a Canadian retired professional roller hockey defenceman, who played with the New Jersey Rockin' Rollers 1996. He played 15 games in Roller Hockey International, and scored 3 goals, and 10 assists with New Jersey. Eberle also had a lengthy minor league ice hockey career, and is a cousin to Jordan Eberle.

== Playing career ==
Eberle played junior hockey from 1988 to 1993, with the Moose Jaw Warriors and Regina Pats. His minor league hockey career lasted from 1993 to 2002, and included playing time with the Providence Bruins, Charlotte Checkers, Atlanta Knights, Nashville Knights, Port Huron Border Cats, Manitoba Moose, Carolina Monarchs, Fort Wayne Komets, Dayton Bombers, Jacksonville Lizard Kings, Ayr Scottish Eagles, and the Pensacola Ice Pilots. After retiring from professional hockey, Eberle has played with the Drake Canucks, and won the Long Lake Hockey League Top Defenceman Award four consecutive times, in the Saskatchewan Hockey Association.
