= Jane Eberle =

American politician

Member of the Maine House of Representatives from the 123rd district
- In office December 2004 – December 2012
- Succeeded by: Scott Hamann

Personal details
- Party: Democrat
- Education: University of New Hampshire

Jane E. Eberle is an American politician from Maine. Eberle was first elected in 2004 as a member of the Maine Democratic Party to represent a portion of Cape Elizabeth and her hometown of South Portland. She earned a bachelor's degree from the University of New Hampshire. She has three children. She was unable to seek re-election in 2012 due to reaching the limit of four consecutive two year terms, and was replaced by fellow Democrat Scott Hamann.
