= Berkeley Tribe =

United States underground newspaper (1969–1972)

- Berkeley Tribe, August 15, 1969 cover
- Type: Underground newspaper
- Format: Tabloid
- Founder(s): Lionel Haines, James A. Schreiber, Stew Albert, Hank Dankowski
- Publisher: Red Mountain Tribe
- Founded: 1969
- Ceased publication: May 1972
- Headquarters: Berkeley, Calif.
- Circulation: 60,000
- ISSN: 0005-9188
- Free online archives: voices.revealdigital.org

The Berkeley Tribe was a counterculture weekly underground newspaper published in Berkeley, California, from 1969 to 1972. It was formed after a staff dispute with publisher Max Scherr and split the nationally known Berkeley Barb into new competing underground weeklies. In July 1969 some 40 editorial and production staff with the Barb went on strike for three weeks, then started publishing the Berkeley Tribe as a rival paper, after first printing an interim issue called Barb on Strike to discuss the strike issues with the readership. They incorporated as Red Mountain Tribe, named after Gallo's one gallon finger-ringed jug of cheap wine, Red Mountain. It became a leading publication of the New Left.

Berkeley Tribe quickly positioned itself as more radical, counter-cultural and politically astute than Scherr's Barb; it soon became more successful, surpassing an initial press run of 20,000 reaching a high point of 60,000 copies by the spring of 1970, according to the Audit Bureau of Circulations. The Tribe was published weekly from early July 1969 until May 1972; by that time the feminist-run newspaper went biweekly for its final issues, folding in May. Like the Barb it was sold on the streets of Berkeley, Oakland and San Francisco by hippie street vendors; all staff were paid weekly with 100 copies which they too sold. Tribe was a member of the Underground Press Syndicate (UPS)—core staff were also involved with the start of UPS—and Liberation News Service.

Original contributions included cartoons by Robert Crumb, Gilbert Shelton and Spain Rodriguez; news covers and illustrations by Stanley Mouse, Rick Griffin, Victor Moscoso and Gary Grimshaw; poetry and prose from Marge Piercy and Diane di Prima; feminist writings by Jane Alpert and Robin Morgan; and original works by William Burroughs, Gary Snyder, Timothy Leary, John Sinclair and Baba Ram Dass, and photographs by Stephen Shames and Alan Copeland.

Tribe reporters covered Bernadette Devlin's fractious fund raising tour on behalf of the Provisional Irish Republican Army; French New Wave film director Jean-Luc Godard's difficulties with his new film One Plus One about The Rolling Stones as well as his uncompleted film One P.M. and cinéma vérité; the world premiere of Woodstock in Hollywood; the gain of Native American pride with the seizure of Alcatraz Island by the American Indian Movement (AIM); the loss of hippie, flower child innocence at Altamont; the Yippie takeover of Disneyland; and the police murder trial of Los Siete de la Raza in San Francisco. The Oakland trial of Huey Newton was a weekly story and, later, staff covered the deadly shootout at the Marin County Courthouse, that killed a judge and the younger brother of George Jackson.

== American underground press ==
Aware of political surveillance, early on in the paper's history, staff voted to remove the staff masthead for security reasons but not until after the paper's contributors became known to the FBI and local police. Berkeley Tribe's two editorial and production offices, located on old Grove Street, were firebombed and subjected to sniper fire on several occasions during its publication heyday in the late 1960s. Tribe staff were forced into self-defensive measures, barricading its taped windows with double stacks of unsold issues to protect working employees. Other underground press around the country were in similar danger; in May 1972 the offices of The Great Speckled Bird in Atlanta were destroyed by firebombs; and Space City News in Houston was also firebombed.

By the time Tribe formed, students and residents had organized People's Park. The final issue of the pre-strike Berkeley Barb publicized this new movement as Let a Thousand Parks Bloom, a play on Chinese premier Chairman Mao Zedong's dictum in The Little Red Book, over Scherr's objections and, in part setting the stage for the mass staff walkout. Tribe carried the public banner and cause of People's Park from that point forward. In May, prior to the founding of the Tribe, collaborative work between students, residents and Barb staff culminated in the planting of People's Park on nearby vacant University property. This expropriation of property was counterpoint to the earlier eminent domain process the university had initiated in 1967 as part of its campus expansion plans; bound with this novel dialectical approach to community-University relations were the continuing issues of free speech and neighborhood services (from which the community control of police election issue would arise). During violent confrontations with local police over the next few days, 128 students were reported shot; one student, James Rector, was killed and another (Alan Blanchard) blinded by a shotgun blast. At one point, the campus was overflown with helicopters dispensing airborne tear gas. The local sheriff, Frank Madigan admitted that some of his deputies (many of whom were Vietnam War veterans) had been overly aggressive in their pursuit of the protesters, acting "as though they were Viet Cong".

Riots during the long hot summers of 1969 and 1970, along with the Kent State killings and shootings at Jackson State, assassinations of Black Panther Party members and growing national unrest over the Vietnam War consumed the editorial staff, who printed issue after provocative issue in reaction. It was after one polemical issue that Berkeley police used pepper gas on the offices of Tribe injuring staff members.

As with many underground and alternative publications, Berkeley Tribe was graveyard-produced with new issues delivered mid-week. Political direction and advertising policy was determined by a three-person editorial board who acted as co-editors-in-chief, rotating semi-annually by majority vote of Tribe staff. Many of the paper's articles consisted of wry commentaries on war, civil rights, politics, police and city government and other social justice issues of the day. Each issue averaged 36–48 pages (its largest edition) with about 55% of page space devoted to display advertising, the bread and butter of all newspapers, daily or weekly.

The newspaper published a weekly barometer of drug prices around the country and the world, which was syndicated through the Underground Press Syndicate, as well as recipes for Molotov cocktails, later reprinted in The Anarchist Cookbook, and telephone hacking, also reprinted in Steal This Book. Interleaved with editorial diatribes, news reporting, drug prices and anarchist recipes were cartoons by Robert Crumb and Gilbert Shelton including serials from Zap Comix.

In late 1969, some record companies (Capitol and Columbia Records) began to cancel display advertising contracts and Berkeley Tribe started losing $7,000 in monthly revenue, making it more difficult to make $1100 weekly payments to their printer. In the meantime, a sharp drop in readership occurred with sales plummeting from a high-point of 60,000 copies to 29,000 in the space of a single month in November, according to Tribe business manager Lionel Haines. This time period ushered in a new staff split, with about 14 of the more pacifistic, culturally oriented hippie staff leaving, after a fight with confrontational New Left staff who were pushing to make the paper more political, along the lines of the newly organized Weatherman. The regenerated staff included members of Weatherman, who started publishing communiques from leftist underground groups, printing a special Black Panthers edition promoting the United Front Against Fascism conference in Oakland and finally, the Declaration of War by the renamed and gender-neutral Weather Underground. The original communiques were often slipped under the front door of Tribe's editorial office, after the paper was put to bed. Further staff splits were still to arrive as national tensions were to be ratcheted by Nixon, Reagan and Rhodes in Ohio the following year.

In its 6 March 1970, issue Tribe informed its readers in a collective editorial that the time had come to "pick up the gun" to combat police and military oppression, urging its Berkeley readers to buy weapons and form "People's Militia" units for self-defense. Staff, with the assistance of Richard Aoki and Black Panther Party members, started the International Liberation School and leased a gun range in the Berkeley hills. FBI surveillance vehicles were parked conspicuously near their offices on a daily basis.

In June and July 1970 Tribe first published a Weather Underground-provided centerfold exposé of Larry Grathwohl, an FBI infiltrator; then the first North American English-edition of The Minimanual of the Urban Guerrilla, written by Brazilian revolutionary Carlos Marighella, in its entirety; and, finally, a highly controversial cover --Blood of a Pig—creating yet another schism and the departure of the majority of editorial staff in protest of the newspaper's new militancy, feminist tilt and pro-Weatherman stance. A few weeks earlier the newspaper's front page consisted of a single quotation in large type from Ronald Reagan (at that time governor of California): "If it takes a bloodbath, let's get it over with" and Governor Rhodes responded with bullets in Ohio.

Berkeley Tribe continued publishing through mid-1972 but, by the end, arcane North Korean style revolutionary political jargon had come to dominate the underground newspaper, alienating much of Tribe's former audience.

== Radical feminism, male chauvinism and staff divisions ==
In early 1970, the first of several staff splits happened when the paper's female staff objected to the placement of sexist, offensive advertising to raise revenue to pay the printing bills. The issue was a full-page ad by Jovan that portrayed women in a subservient role. It was at this point that many of the more chauvinist male staff resigned. Advertising was purified and revenue began shrinking. From then on, New Leftists controlled the direction of Berkeley Tribe. The Jovan ad was rejected and the feminists had won.

Similar ideological battles were ongoing with Tribe's sister newspapers Rat Subterranean News, Sabot, Chicago Seed, Ann Arbor Argus and others throughout the country. When members of Dock of the Bay, a new underground paper across the Bay in San Francisco, planned to launch the San Francisco Sex Review in what was seen as a crass money-making scheme to get rich off sex ads, feminist staffers on the Tribe participated in a Women's Liberation raid to confront the male editors in a political standoff which ended with the victorious feminists taking the page layouts from Waller Press and burning them, on the same morning that the new paper had been scheduled to go to press.

Similar action took place when another underground newspaper, San Francisco's Good Times, decided to accept pornographic display and classified sex trade advertising in early 1970.

== Red Mountain Tribe commune ==
Staff lived in a Berkeley Tribe commune on Ashby Avenue, including most production and editorial staff. The commune hosted numerous fellow travelers, bands, fugitives, film directors, and actresses including MC5, Jean-Luc Godard, Jane Fonda, Timothy Leary, Ram Dass, Paul Kantner from the Jefferson Airplane, Pun Plamondon, White Panther Party co-founder with John Sinclair, and Hunter S. Thompson. The commune was a leased two-story residence above College Avenue, with a secluded backyard where the cover photo of the Tribe's well-known "Call to Arms" issue was staged. The commune served as a way station for leftist political fugitives and the base of operations for International Liberation School, a self-defense weapons training center that had a gun range in the Berkeley Hills.

== New Left radicalization ==
During the spring and summer of 1970, Berkeley Tribe became more radicalized, with the continuing war in Vietnam and assassination of black leaders. The paper earlier had published a Governor Ronald Reagan quote on its cover, If It Takes A Bloodbath, expressing his sentiment toward student radicals. Then Berkeley Tribe published the entire Mini-Manual of the Urban Guerrilla written by Brazilian revolutionary Carlos Marighella and Tupamaros, the first North American English-language edition. After this, the paper published a centerfold exposé on FBI infiltrator Larry Grathwohl, supplied by Weather Underground. Subsequently, the editorial offices of Berkeley Tribe were firebombed and staff were forced to barricade the taped front windows with stacks of old issues after shots were fired into the offices twice while the paper was in production. These incidents heightened the sense of paranoia then sweeping the country, fueled by the tactics of Nixon's COINTELPRO domestic spying apparatus.

== Staff split and feminist takeover ==
Among the next several issues published was the highly controversial photo Dead Pig, portraying the scene where a Berkeley police officer was killed on University Avenue in South Berkeley the previous week. This caused the majority of editorial staff to depart the newspaper. It was at this point more than half of the staff and editorial board resigned in protest of the cover and the underground newspaper was taken over by the radical feminist faction; very few of the production staff left.

Berkeley Tribe then began publishing original communiques from Weather Underground, including the Declaration of War written by Bernardine Dohrn and others claiming responsibility for the numerous bombings and arson attacks around the Bay Area. The special Black Panther Party issue promoting the United Front Against Fascism Conference in Oakland saw the departure of several staff members. With declining ad revenues to underwrite weekly $1100 printing bills, fewer issues were printed and circulation declined. Over time, the paper's news articles suffered, degenerating into diatribes but with still excellent graphics and layout. The Berkeley Tribe disbanded within two years, ending four years of the underground weekly, eclipsing the Berkeley Barb. The Barb would continue with Max Scherr, ending its publishing life as a sex trade publication in 1980.

== See also ==
- San Francisco Oracle
- East Village Other
- Underground Press Syndicate
- Underground press
- List of underground newspapers of the 1960s counterculture
