= James Baker (disambiguation) =

James Baker (born 1930) is an American attorney and statesman.

James, Jim(mie), Jimmy, or Jamie Baker may also refer to:

== Lawyers ==
- James A. Baker (born 1821) (1821–1897), American jurist and politician; often called "Judge Baker"
- James A. Baker (born 1857) (1857–1941), American attorney often called "Captain Baker"
- James A. Baker Jr. (1892–1973), American attorney
- James A. Baker (government attorney), American attorney and FBI general counsel from 2014 to 2017.

== Musicians ==
- James "Iron Head" Baker (1884–1944), African American traditional folk singer
- James Baker (musician) (1954–2025), Australian rock drummer and songwriter
- James Baker (composer) (fl. 2000s–2010s), American composer and percussionist with the New York City Ballet Orchestra
- BlocBoy JB or James Baker (born 1996), American musician

== Public officials ==
- James Baker (Roundhead) (died 1689), English lawyer and politician
- James A. Baker (born 1821) (1821–1897), American jurist and politician in Texas
- James McNair Baker (1821–1892), American jurist and politician in the Confederate Senate during the American Civil War
- James H. Baker (politician) (1829–1913), American politician who was Ohio Secretary of State and Minnesota Secretary of State
- James H. Baker (DOD), American foreign policy advisor
- James G. Baker (politician), American politician from Missouri
- James Baker (Canadian politician) (1830–1906), British soldier and politician in British Columbia, Canada
- James Marion Baker (1861–1940), American politician, 11th Secretary of the United States Senate
- James A. Baker (justice) (1931–2008), American jurist who served on the Texas Supreme Court from 1995 to 2003
- James M. Baker (mayor) (born 1942), American politician, mayor of Wilmington, Delaware from 2001 to 2013
- James M. Baker (Virginia politician) (1845–1927), American politician, member of the Virginia House of Delegates
- James E. Baker (born 1960), American judge, Chief Judge of the United States Court of Appeals for the Armed Forces
- James A. Baker (government attorney) (fl. 1980s–2010s), American DOJ official; Counsel for Intelligence Policy; former counsel at Twitter, Inc.
- Jim Baker (politician) (fl. 2000s–2010s), Canadian legislator from Labrador West in Newfoundland/Labrador House of Assembly
- James O. Baker, candidate in the 2010 United States House of Representatives elections in Missouri

== Religious figures ==
- James Chamberlain Baker (1879–1969), American Bishop of Methodist Episcopal Church and United Methodist Church
- Father Yod or James Edward Baker (1922–1975), American spiritual leader
- Jim Bakker (1940–2026), American televangelist at the center of a sex scandal and accounting fraud

== Sportspeople ==
- James Baker (English cricketer) (1792–1839), English cricketer mostly for Sussex
- James Clark Baker (1866–1939), New Zealand cricketer
- James Mitchell Baker (1878–1956), South African Olympic runner
- Jim Baker (footballer) (1891–1966), English professional centre back during the 1910s and 1920s for Leeds United A.F.C.
- Jimmy Baker (footballer, born 1904) (1904–1979), Welsh-born football wing half who played for Coventry City
- James Baker (footballer, born 1911) (1911–1974), English football player
- Jimmie Baker (basketball) (born 1953), American basketball player
- Jim Baker (bowls) (born 1958), Northern Irish and combined Irish lawn and indoor bowls player
- Jamie Baker (ice hockey) (born 1966), Canadian professional hockey centre and sports broadcaster
- Jamie Baker (tennis) (born 1986), British former tennis player
- James Baker (New Zealand cricketer) (born 1988), New Zealand cricketer for Northern Districts
- Jim Baker (runner), American athlete, winner of the 1968 4 × 880 yard relay at the NCAA Division I Indoor Track and Field Championships

== Other people ==
- Jim Baker (frontiersman) (1818–1898), American trapper, scout and guide
- James Baker (university president) (1848–1925), American academic administrator
- James A. Baker (trade unionist) (before 1875–after 1903), Canadian miner and trade unionist
- James Gilbert Baker (1914–2005), American astronomer and optics expert
- Jimmy Baker (Australian artist) (c. 1915–2010), Australian Aboriginal artist
- Jimmie Baker (television producer) (1920–2003), American television producer
- A. J. Baker or Jim Baker (1922–2017), Australian philosopher
- D. James Baker (born 1937), American oceanographer
- Jim B. Baker (1941–2014), American actor
- James Robert Baker (1947–1997), American author
- James Baker-Jarvis (1950–2011), American applied physicist
- James Baker, Australian art collector who owned the Museum of Contemporary Art, Brisbane, 1987–1994
- James K. Baker (fl. 1970s–2000s), American entrepreneur and computer scientist, founder of Dragon Systems
- Jimmy Baker (American artist) (born 1980), American artist

== See also ==
- Baker (surname)
- James B. Baker House, historic home in Aberdeen, Maryland, United States
- James Baker Institute, public policy think tank at Rice University, Houston, Texas, United States
