= United States Public Service Academy =

Logo of the US Public Service Academy

The United States Public Service Academy (S. 960 and H.R. 1671) is a proposed institution of higher education. The Academy would be a federally subsidized four-year college modeled on the United States military service academies devoted to public service. It was envisioned in 2006 and introduced into congress in 2007 and again in the next congress but did not pass.

== The proposed academy ==
=== Academics ===
- Applicants to the Academy would follow a congressional nomination process similar to that used for admission to the US service academies.
- Once admitted, students would earn credits toward a Bachelor of Arts or Bachelor of Science degree. Students would be required to choose a public service concentration in the field in which they ultimately will serve post-graduation.
- All USPSA students would be required to spend a period of time studying abroad. Students would be required to take courses in foreign languages and international relations. Students would spend eight weeks each summer participating in structured learning programs, such as emergency response training, civilian internship in the armed forces, and an internship with a public agency.

=== Service requirements ===
- Graduates would be required to serve the United States for five years in the public sector.
- Failure to complete five years of service would result in a dishonorable discharge from the Academy. Delinquent graduates would be required to repay the cost of their education.
- The Academy would subsidize its students’ graduate education in return for an extended service commitment. For every year of subsidized graduate education, students must add two additional years to their service commitment.

== Legislative history ==
The Academy was envisioned in 2006 by Chris Myers Asch and Shawn Raymond.

The Public Service Academy Act was first introduced in March 2007 by Hillary Clinton and Arlen Specter in the Senate and James Moran and Christopher Shays in the House of Representatives. In the 110th Congress, the bill had 24 Senate co-sponsors and 123 House co-sponsors.

The bill was reintroduced unsuccessfully in the 111th Congress as House Bill 2102. The Senate leads included Arlen Specter and Mark Udall.

== Criticism ==
Criticism of the Academy has focused mainly on the flexibility and cost-effectiveness of the model. Maxwell School professors David Van Slyke and Alasdair Roberts wrote that the proposed academy would be redundant to the missions of the 150 undergraduate and graduate public affairs programs already in existence, whose breadth and diversity could never be matched by a single institution. They contend that a nationwide tuition reimbursement program resembling ROTC would be better suited to the training of young civil servants.
