= Rosemary O'Leary =

American academic

- Born: 1955 (age 70–71); Kansas City, Missouri, USA

Academic background
- Education: BA University of Kansas (English Literature major; Biology minor); JD University of Kansas (Law); MPA University of Kansas (Local Government Management) PhD Syracuse University (Public Management/Administration and Public Policy)
- Alma mater: Maxwell School of Citizenship and Public Affairs at Syracuse University

Academic work
- Discipline: Public policy, law, government ethics, and public management
- Institutions: School of Public and Environmental Affairs, Indiana University-Bloomington Maxwell School of Citizenship and Public Affairs, Syracuse University School of Public Affairs, University of Kansas
- Notable works: The Ethics of Dissent: Managing Guerrilla Government, 3rd edition. Washington D.C.: Congressional Quarterly Press, 180 pp. (2020). Best Book in Public and Nonprofit Management Award, Academy of Management, 2021. Second edition (2014); First edition (2006).

Rosemary O'Leary is an American Scholar and Distinguished Professor Emerita at both the Maxwell School of Syracuse University and the University of Kansas. Her research focuses on public management, collaboration, conflict resolution, environmental and natural resources management, and public law.

== Education ==
She earned a Bachelor of Arts degree from the University of Kansas, as well as a Masters in Public Administration and a Juris Doctor degree. While studying law, she developed an interest in administrative and environmental law, disciplines that later became central to her academic career.

After entering public service and practicing environmental law, O'Leary pursued doctoral study in public administration at the Maxwell School of Citizenship and Public Affairs at Syracuse University, where she earned a Ph.D. Her doctoral training combined public administration, public law, organizational theory, and policy analysis, providing the interdisciplinary foundation for her later scholarship on administrative behavior, collaborative governance, public management, and ethics.

== Academic career ==
She joined the faculty of the Maxwell School of Citizenship and Public Affairs, where she became one of the school's leading scholars in public management and collaborative governance.

Before joining Syracuse University, O'Leary held faculty appointments at the Indiana University School of Public and Environmental Affairs -Bloomington, where she taught courses in public administration, public policy, environmental law, and administrative ethics. She later taught local government management and administrative ethics at the University of Kansas.

O'Leary also played an important role in advancing professional education in public administration. At Syracuse University, she co-founded E-PARCC, a web-based initiative that provides free, peer-reviewed teaching resources on collaborative governance and conflict resolution , as well as the Collaborative Governance Initiative to foster rigorous research on collaboration to improve government service.

O'Leary has held numerous academic leadership positions including serving as the Director of the School of Public Affairs & Administration at the University of Kansas, Co-Director of the Program for the Advancement of Research on Conflict and Collaboration at Syracuse University, and Director of the Ph.D.programs in Public Administration both at the University of Kansas and at the Maxwell School of Syracuse University.

As a Fulbright Scholar in Malaysia and the Philippines, an Ian Axford Public Policy Fellow in New Zealand, and later a Fulbright Specialist in Nepal, she worked with universities and public institutions outside the United States on questions of governance, public-sector reform, and collaborative management.

In 2008, she organized Minnowbrook III, the third conference in the influential Minnowbrook tradition established by Dwight Waldo four decades earlier. In 2019, the International Research Society for Public Management (IRSPM) established the annual "Rosemary O'Leary Prize for Outstanding Scholarship on Women in Public Administration."

== Research ==
=== Guerrilla government and ethical dissent ===
O'Leary is widely credited with the development of the concept of "guerrilla government," describing situations in which public servants intentionally resist, circumvent, or quietly challenge organizational directives that they believe are unlawful, unethical, or contrary to the public interest. Through successive editions of The Ethics of Dissent: Managing Guerrilla Government, O'Leary expanded the concept beyond individual case studies to develop a broader framework for understanding organizational dissent across public institutions. She argued that acts of resistance often arise not from opposition to government itself but from competing interpretations of legality, accountability, professional ethics, and personal ethics. Its third edition received the Academy of Management's Best Book in Public Management Award in 2021.

=== Collaborative governance and conflict resolution ===
A second major theme of O'Leary's scholarship has been collaborative governance, particularly the management of public problems that require cooperation among governments, nonprofit organizations, private actors, and citizens. Her research argued that many contemporary policy challenges including environmental protection, natural resource management, and intergovernmental coordination cannot be addressed effectively through hierarchical bureaucratic structures alone. Instead, they require sustained collaboration across organizational and jurisdictional boundaries.

=== The impact of courts on public administration ===
A third major theme of O’Leary’s scholarship has been the impact of court decisions and litigation on public administration and public policy. Beginning with her dissertation, her research examined how judicial decisions have shaped public policy and administrative practice in the United States. Her work also examined how persistent litigation can affect the work of scientists, engineers, and lawyers, redirecting public servants’ attention from scientific and technical planning toward legal compliance and court-ordered mandates.

She has won 13 national awards for her research and 2 international awards for her research, including 4 best book awards. She is the winner of 11 teaching awards, two of them national. She is also the only person to win four Network of Schools of Public Policy, Affairs and Administration (NASPAA) awards for Best Dissertation, Excellence in Teaching, Distinguished Research, and Excellence in Doctoral Education. O’Leary has worked in Hong Kong, mainland China, Malaysia, the Philippines, New Zealand, India, Nepal, and the US. She was President of the Public Management Research Association, 2017-2019.

=== Minnowbrook III and the future of public administration ===
In 2008 O'Leary convened and coordinated Minnowbrook III, the third conference in the influential Minnowbrook series originally established by Dwight Waldo in 1968. Unlike its predecessors, Minnowbrook III brought together established scholars and emerging researchers from numerous countries to examine how globalization, technological change, collaborative governance, and increasing policy complexity were reshaping the field of public administration.

The conference resulted in The Future of Public Administration around the World: The Minnowbrook Perspective, which documented changing research agendas and encouraged greater international and comparative perspectives within the discipline. O'Leary and her co-editors David Van Slyke and Soonhee Kim emphasized that public administration had evolved beyond the study of governmental bureaucracy alone to encompass collaborative governance, nonprofit organizations, transnational institutions, and citizen participation. Minnowbrook III is widely regarded as helping redefine the intellectual priorities of the field for the twenty-first century.

Her engagement also extended to public service. Following the Space Shuttle Columbia disaster, O'Leary served on NASA's Return to Flight Task Group, where she contributed expertise on organizational culture, management, and institutional accountability during the agency's efforts to resume shuttle operations. Her work on the task group reflected her longstanding interest in the relationship between organizational behavior, ethical leadership, and public-sector performance, and she received the NASA Public Service Medal in recognition of these contributions.

== Awards and Honors ==
- In 2021, O'Leary won the Duncombe Award for outstanding mentoring of PhD students given by the Network of Schools of Public Policy, Affairs, and Administration (NASPAA). In 2017, she was awarded three lifetime achievement honors: The Provan Award for outstanding contributions to empirical theory given by the Academy of Management Public and Nonprofit Division, the Frederickson Award for lifetime achievement and continuous contributions to public management research over an extended career given by the Public Management Research Association, and the Routledge Award for “outstanding contribution to public management research” given by the International Research Society for Public Management (IRSPM). In 2016 O'Leary won the John Gaus Award for a “lifetime of exemplary scholarship in the joint tradition of political science and public administration” given by the American Political Science Association. In 2014, she was the recipient of the Dwight Waldo Award for “distinguished contributions to the professional literature of public administration and in recognition of a distinguished career as author, educator, and public administrator”, given by the American Society for Public Administration.
- In 2014, an article she and her co-authors, Lisa Blomgren Bingham Amsler and Tina Nabatchi, had written nine years earlier was selected as “One of 75 Most Influential Articles since 1940” published in Public Administration Review. The article was "The New Governance: Practices and Processes for Stakeholder and Citizen Participation in the Work of Government" PAR 65(5), 547-558 (2005). This article also is in the top one percent of most-cited articles in public affairs in the past 30 years.
- In 2007, O'Leary won the Charles H. Levine Memorial Award for “excellence in public administration research, teaching, and service to the broader community” given jointly by the American Society for Public Administration and the National Association of Schools of Public Affairs and Administration. O'Leary was the 2004 recipient of the Distinguished Research Award "for published work that has had a substantial impact on the thought and understanding of public administration", given jointly by the Network of Schools of Public Policy, Affairs and Administration and the American Society for Public Administration
- In 1998, O'Leary was elected a Fellow of the U.S. National Academy of Public Administration (NAPA). NAPA is a non-profit, non-governmental and non-partisan organization that provides independent research and studies to advance the field of public administration. It is chartered by Congress and aims to improve government performance by offering solutions to significant challenges faced by governments at all levels.
