= Guthrie S. Birkhead Jr. =

Dean of the Maxwell School of Citizenship and Public Affairs of Syracuse University

Dean of Maxwell School of Citizenship and Public Affairs
- In office November, 1977 – 1988
- Preceded by: Alan K. Campbell
- Succeeded by: John L. Palmer

Personal details
- Born: 28 October 1920 Holden, Missouri
- Died: 22 July 2013 (aged 92) Syracuse, New York
- Spouse: Louise Gartner Birkhead
- Children: 3
- Education: Princeton University; University of Missouri; Jefferson College (Missouri)

Guthrie Sweeny Birkhead Jr. (1920–2013) was an American academic and the sixth dean of the Maxwell School of Citizenship and Public Affairs of Syracuse University.

== Early life and education ==
Birkhead was born on 28 October 1920 in Holden, Missouri to Yula Donna Glass and Guthrie S. Birkhead, Sr., a minister in local church.

He earned his associate degree at Jefferson College in Missouri, a bachelor's and master's degree at the University of Missouri (1942 and 1947). During the Second World War, he was commissioned as a first lieutenant in General Patton's Third Army and served with the "Rolling W" 89th Infantry Division in France and Germany. After war, he joined Princeton University where he earned a master's degree in 1949 and completed his PhD in politics in 1951 in U. S. Conservation Policy.

== Maxwell School at Syracuse ==
Birkhead joined the Maxwell School faculty in 1950 and was its youngest member for years. He was promoted to full professor of political science in 1960. At Maxwell, he served as director of the metropolitan studies program; chair of the political science department; and director of Maxwell's public administration program. He taught more than 2,500 graduate students and 1,000 undergraduates. Many of his students had prominent careers in public service and as professors.

Birkhead succeeded Scotty Campbell to became Maxwell’s dean in 1977, from which he retired in 1988, but continued teaching on the faculty for more than a decade to stay connected with students.

He was active in public policy in New York, and was a key figure at the 1967 New York State Constitutional Convention. He served as chair of the New York State Democratic Party's platform committee under Governor Mario Cuomo in 1983-84. He led several water conservation initiatives, including the Delaware River Basin Commission. He travelled occasionally, to Turkey, Pakistan and China, to provide public administration training and resources to civil servants.

== Honors ==
Birkhead was awarded the Elmer B. Staats Public Service Career Award in 1994.

The Birkhead-Burkhead Teaching Excellence Award and Professorship at the Maxwell School is named in his honor.
