= NRW (disambiguation) =

NRW usually refers to North Rhine-Westphalia (Nordrhein-Westfalen), one of the sixteen states of Germany.

NRW may also refer to:

== Organisations ==
- Natural Resources Wales, a Welsh regulatory body
- NLEX Road Warriors, a Philippine basketball team
- NRW Holdings, an Australian construction and mining contractor

== Other uses ==
- National Reconciliation Week, celebrations of Australia's indigenous history and culture
- Nicolson–Ross–Weir method, a method for measuring material properties for microwaves
- Non-revenue water, leakage of water supply
- Norwich railway station, England (by GB station code)
- .nrw, a Nikon RAW file format
