= Craig M. Boise =

American law school dean (born 1963)

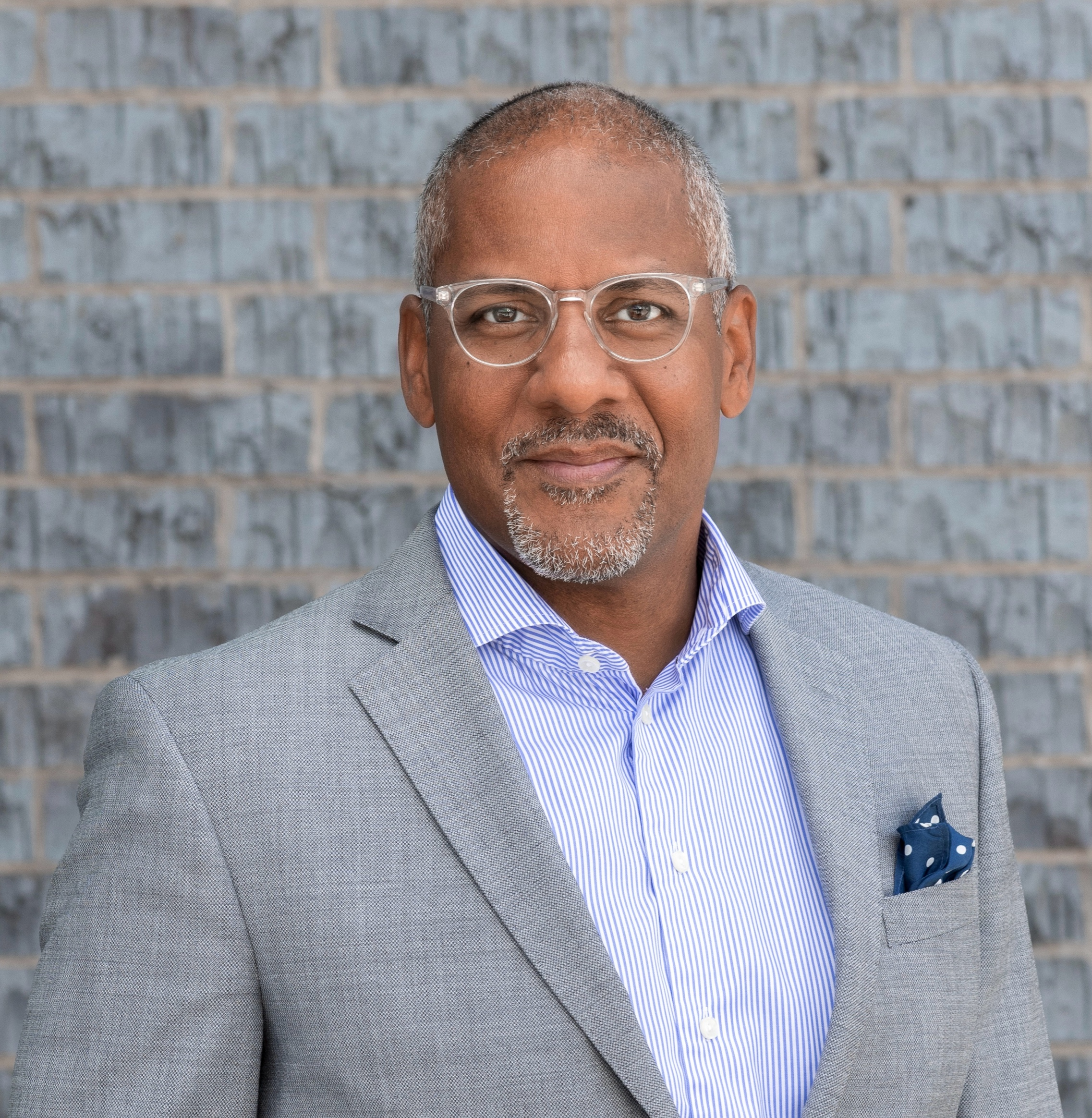
- Born: 1963 (age 62–63); Kansas City, Missouri, U.S.
- Education: University of Missouri–Kansas City (BA); University of Chicago Law School (JD); New York University School of Law (LLM)
- Employer: Syracuse Law
- Known for: corporate and international tax policy
- Spouse: Marina Boise
- Children: 2

Craig M. Boise (born 1963) is an American legal scholar who was the dean of Syracuse University College of Law from July 2016 until June 30, 2024. He previously served as dean of Cleveland–Marshall College of Law.

== Early life and education ==
Boise was born in 1963 and raised in a small farming community near Kansas City, Missouri. He began playing piano in second grade and continued to develop as a pianist through high school. He graduated from Lathrop High School in 1982.

Following high school, he enrolled at the University of Missouri–Kansas City Conservatory of Music where he completed substantial coursework in piano performance. However, after two years, he left college for financial reasons and joined the Kansas City Missouri Police Department, where he served as a law enforcement officer from 1986 to 1991. While in the police academy, he grew interested in constitutional law and returned to college to complete his undergraduate education and pursue law school.

Boise graduated in 1991 with a B.A. degree summa cum laude in political science. He enrolled at the University of Chicago Law School in 1991, and graduated with his J.D. in 1994. In 1999, he completed an LL.M. in tax law from New York University School of Law.

== Law practice ==
After graduating from law school, Boise worked as a law clerk to Judge Pasco Bowman II on the U.S. Court of Appeals for the Eighth Circuit. Between 1995 and 1997, Boise worked as an associate at Husch & Eppenberger, LLC, before working in the tax practice groups of Cleary Gottlieb Steen & Hamilton LLP, Akin Gump Strauss Hauer & Feld and Thompson Hine LLP (Cleveland) between 1997 and 2003.

== Academic career ==
Boise left law practice for academia in 2003, joining the Case Western Reserve University School of Law faculty as an assistant professor and later becoming an associate professor. In 2006, he served as a visiting professor at Washington and Lee University School of Law. In 2009, he moved to DePaul University College of Law where he was appointed full professor and Director of the Graduate Tax Program. Boise has taught various tax law courses and published on U.S. corporate tax, international taxation, and offshore financial centers.

Boise's research addresses and analyzes complex issues within these areas of tax law, contributing to broader discussions on tax policy and financial regulation. His work has been published in journals including the Minnesota Law Review, George Mason Law Review, and the Texas International Law Journal.

=== Cleveland State University College of Law leadership (2011–2016) ===
In 2011, Boise was appointed the 14th Dean and Joseph C. Hostetler–BakerHostetler Chair in Law at Cleveland–Marshall College of Law, becoming the institution's first Black dean. His tenure was marked by advancements in program development, including the launch of the Center for Cybersecurity and Privacy Protection, the establishment of nation's first law school-based solo practice incubator, and the development of a Master of Legal Studies (M.L.S.) degree for non-lawyers. Boise's fundraising efforts generated over $1 million in new scholarship.

=== Syracuse University College of Law leadership (2016–2024) ===
Boise became dean of Syracuse University College of Law in July 2016. He replaced Hannah Arterian who stepped down as the Dean after 13 years.

At Syracuse, he focused on providing leadership on navigating the disruptions occurring in legal services and in online legal education, increasing diversity, bar-pass rate, & revenues, and taught tax law. In 2017, he was criticized for attempting to terminate the 'Cold Case Justice Initiative' at SU. The college launched the Orange Advance pipeline program with historically Black colleges and universities.

== Professional service and recognition ==
Boise served a five-year term on the Council of the American Bar Association (ABA) Section on Legal Education and Admissions to the Bar, which oversees the accreditation of U.S. law schools. Prior to this, he was a member of the Council’s Standards Review Committee for five years and also served on the Advisory Council of the ABA Legal Education Police Practices Consortium.

He was appointed co-chair of the Cleveland (Ohio) Community Policing Commission, established under a consent decree between the City of Cleveland and the U.S. Department of Justice. He also served on the Independent Review Committee of the New York State Commission on Ethics and Lobbying in Government and participated in the applicant screening committee for the New York Board of Law Examiners. In 2018, he co-chaired the transition team for New York Attorney General Letitia James. Additional service includes roles with the New York State Judicial Institute on Professionalism in the Law and the New York State Bar Association's COVID-19 Recovery Task Force.

In legal education, Boise served on the Steering Committee of the Association of American Law Schools (AALS) Deans' Forum and co-chaired the Executive Committee of the AALS Deans' Section. In 2021, he was listed among the 50 power players in the Western New York legal community by the NY Daily Record.

He is admitted to practice law in Ohio, New York, and Missouri.

== Personal life ==
Boise is an avid sailor and enjoys sailing with family in the Caribbean. He has been described as the 'most interesting man in the world' by The Daily Orange for his collection of talents that include being a skilled classical pianist, scuba diver, sailor, motorcyclist, corporate international tax law guru, salsa dancer, world traveler and a former SWAT team member. Cleveland State University's Viking Pride Alumni Newsletter said "Craig Boise is possibly the only Harley-riding, piano-playing, calf-roping law dean in the country".
