= Judge Sparks =

Judge Sparks may refer to:

- John E. Sparks (born 1953), judge of the United States Court of Appeals for the Armed Forces
- Sam Sparks (born 1939), judge of the Austin Division of the United States District Court for the Western District of Texas
- William Morris Sparks (1872–1950), judge of the United States Court of Appeals for the Seventh Circuit
