= James Edward Baker =

James Edward Baker may also refer to:

- James Baker (footballer, born 1911) (1911–1974), English footballer
- Father Yod (James Edward Baker, 1922–1975), American New Age commune founder known as Father Yod or Yahowha.

== See also ==
- James Baker (disambiguation)
