= Hannah Arterian =

American law school dean (born 1949)

Hannah R. Arterian
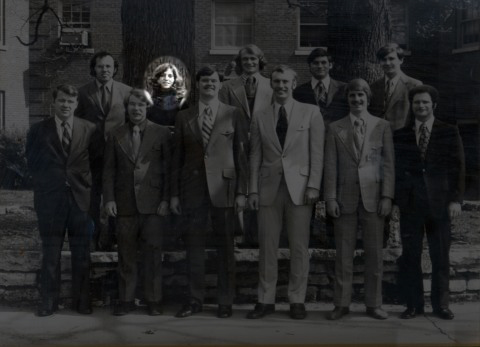
- Iowa Law Review editorial staff, 1972–1973
- Born: September 9, 1949; New York City, U.S.
- Died: April 8, 2022 (aged 72)
- Education: Elmira College (BS); University of Iowa Law School (JD)
- Known for: Corporate tax law, employment law, Title VII
- Children: 4

Hannah Arterian (1949–2022) was an American legal administrator, academic, and scholar. She was the first woman to hold the post of Associate Dean at Arizona State University College of Law, and the second woman to act as Dean of Syracuse University College of Law. She also served as Chair of the AccessLex Institute's board of directors.

== Early life and education ==
Hannah Arterian was born in Manhattan and grew up in Prince's Bay in Staten Island. Her parents were of Armenian and Assyrian descent on her father's side and German and English on her mother's. She was the eldest of two sisters.

Arterian attended Elmira College, where she was inducted into Phi Beta Kappa and earned a Bachelor's Degree in English Literature. The college awarded her an honorary doctorate in 2009.

Arterian attended University of Iowa College of Law. While a student, Arterian was the first woman to hold an editorial position as one of the Iowa Law Review's Notes & Comments Editors. By the completion of her degree, she received the Murray Award for outstanding third-year law student, was inducted as a member of the Order of the Coif, and graduated third in her class with high distinction. In addition, she received the Hancher-Finkbine Award, an honor for achievement that is university-wide.

After graduation, Arterian practiced corporate tax law at the white-shoe firm Dewey Ballantine in Manhattan for several years.

== Academic career ==
Arterian returned to the University of Iowa to teach as a visiting professor. She joined the faculty in 1978, only a few years after the first woman faculty member had ever taught at the college. Arterian went on to teach at the law schools of University of Houston and Arizona State University. She joined the Arizona State University College of Law faculty in 1979 as the only woman professor. Arterian would go on to become its first woman Associate Dean, a post she held for a decade.

In 2002, Arterian was hired as Dean of the Syracuse University College of Law, only the second woman to ever hold the post. While Dean, she fundraised for a new building, which was built and opened during her tenure: Dineen Hall opened in 2014. She also established several programs, including the college's Institute for National Security and Counterterrorism (INSCT), the Technology Commercialization Law Program, Institute for the Study of the Judiciary, Politics, and the Media, and the first Veterans Law Clinic in New York State. The latter was at the suggestion of a second year law student, Lt. Thomas Caruso. Lt. Caruso is quoted as saying, "I came to Dean Arterian with a proposal for a veterans legal clinic. She easily could have dismissed it as a pie in the sky idea from a young student. She didn't. She not only gave the idea a chance, she made it possible." She stepped down from her post in 2015.

In 2014, Arterian was elected as Chair of Board of Directors for AccessLex Institute (then Access Group), a nonprofit organization composed of representatives from American Bar Association-accredited institutions that focused on education financing and debt management for law students. In 2022, AccessLex created the Hannah R. Arterian Memorial Scholarship, which provides a first year law student with $50,000 toward their tuition.

Prior to her successes as a legal administrator, Arterian's scholarship specialized in employment law. One much-read article focused on Title VII and the dangers of chemical toxins for pregnant workers.
