= Alan K. Campbell =

American academic

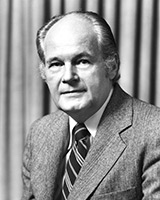
- Campbell in 1978

Chair of the United States Civil Service Commission
- In office c. 1977 – 1979
- Preceded by: Robert E. Hampton

Director of the United States Office of Personnel Management
- In office January 2, 1979 – January 20, 1981
- President: Jimmy Carter
- Succeeded by: Donald J. Devine

Personal details
- Born: Alan Keith Campbell; May 31, 1923 Elgin, Nebraska, U.S.
- Died: February 4, 1998 (aged 74) Haverford, Pennsylvania
- Cause of death: Emphysema
- Spouse: Jane Owen
- Children: 2
- Education: Whitman College; Wayne University; Harvard University
- Occupation: Scholar; Government official

Alan Keith Campbell (May 31, 1923 – February 4, 1998) was an American academic and the first Director of the United States Office of Personnel Management.

== Career ==
Campbell, affectionately known as Scotty, served as a professor and later the dean (1969-1976) of the Maxwell School of Citizenship and Public Affairs at Syracuse University. Before arriving at Maxwell, Campbell was the deputy controller of the State of New York for two years. Campbell was also the chair of the United States Civil Service Commission.

Campbell died from emphysema in Haverford, Pennsylvania in 1998 at the age of 74.

== Books ==
- Bahl, Roy W; Greytak, David; Campbell, Alan K (1974). Taxes, Expenditures, and the Economic Base: Case Study of New York City. New York: Praeger. ISBN 9780275088101. OCLC 422049159.
- Mosher, Frederick C.; Campbell, Alan K. (August 1, 1974). "Watergate: Its Implications for Responsible Government". Administration & Society. 6 (2): 155–170. doi:10.1177/009539977400600201. OCLC 1087130860. S2CID 220421689.
