= James G. Baker (politician) =

American politician

Member of the U.S. House of Representatives from Missouri's 27th district

Missouri House of Representatives
- In office 1971–1977

Personal details
- Born: 1938 St. Louis, Missouri, US
- Died: 2020 (aged 81–82) Overland Park, Kansas, US
- Party: Democratic
- Spouse(s): Linda McCaughey, Sharon Baker
- Occupation: labor law attorney

James Glen Baker (June 25, 1938 - April 17, 2020) was an American Democratic politician who served in the Missouri House of Representatives. He was born in St. Louis, Missouri, and was educated in Kansas City public schools in Missouri, University of Missouri-Columbia, and Harvard University. He served in the United States Army for 3 years. He narrowly lost the Missouri Attorney General's election in 1976 to future governor, U.S. senator, and United States Attorney General John Ashcroft. Baker died in 2020 from COVID-19.
