= William C. Banks =

American legal scholar

- Born: William Charles Banks; December 30, 1948 (age 76); Lincoln, Nebraska
- Education: University of Nebraska–Lincoln (BA); University of Denver (MS, JD)
- Occupations: Professor; lawyer; author
- Employer: Syracuse University
- Known for: Constitutional law; national security law; counterterrorism law

William Charles Banks (born December 30, 1948) is an American law professor and legal scholar in constitutional law, national security law, and counterterrorism law. He is a Professor of Law Emeritus at Syracuse University College of Law and Professor of Public Administration and International Affairs Emeritus at SU's Maxwell School of Citizenship and Public Affairs. He is also the current Chair of the American Bar Association's Standing Committee on Law & National Security.

== Early life and education ==
Banks was born on December 30, 1948, in Lincoln, Nebraska. He earned his Bachelor of Arts from the University of Nebraska–Lincoln in 1971 and J.D. and M.S. from the University of Denver in 1974 and 1982, respectively.

== Career ==
Banks joined the faculty of the Syracuse University College of Law in 1978. Since 1998, he has been a Professor of Public Administration in Syracuse University's Maxwell School of Citizenship and Public Affairs. In 2008, he was named the first SU College of Law Board of Advisors Distinguished Professor of Law.

In 1994 he was appointed as special counsel to the United States Senate Judiciary Committee for the confirmation hearings of Stephen Breyer to the Supreme Court of the United States.

In 2003, he founded the Institute for National Security and Counterterrorism, a research institute sponsored by Syracuse University's Maxwell School and College of Law. It was renamed to the Institute for Security Policy and Law in 2019.

Banks is editor-in-chief of the Journal of National Security Law & Policy, the world's only peer-reviewed national security law and policy publication. He currently serves as a member of the InfraGard National Members Alliance Board of Advisors; of the Advisory Council for the Perpetual Peace Project; and of the Executive Board of the International Counter-Terrorism Academic Community (ICTAC). He is also a Distinguished Fellow of the Institute for Veterans and Military Families at Syracuse University.

He is a member of the American Society of International Law, the American Bar Association, and the New York State Bar Association.

== Publications ==
- Banks, William; Raven-Hanse, Peter (1994). National Security Law and the Power of the Purse. Oxford University Press. ISBN 978-0195085389.
- Banks, William; De Nevers, Renée; Wallerstein, Mitchel (2008). Combating Terrorism, Strategies and Approaches. CQ Press. ISBN 978-0872892996.
- Banks, William (2011). New Battlefields/Old Laws: Critical Debates from the Hague Convention to Asymmetric Warfare. Columbia University Press. ISBN 978-0231526562.
- Banks, William (2013). Counterinsurgency Law: New Directions in Asymmetric Warfare. Oxford University Press. ISBN 978-0199311460.
- Banks, William; Dycus, Stephen (2016). Soldiers on the Home Front: The Domestic Role of the American Military. Harvard University Press. ISBN 978-0674495418.
- Banks, William; Smolla, Rodney (2019). Constitutional Law: Structure and Rights in Our Federal System (7th ed.). Carolina Academic Press. ISBN 978-1531007331.
- Banks, William; Dycus, Stephen; Raven-Hansen, Peter; Vladeck, Stephen (2020). National Security Law (7th ed.). Aspen Publishing. ISBN 978-1543806793.
- Banks, William; Dycus, Stephen; Raven-Hansen, Peter; Vladeck, Stephen (2020). Counterterrorism Law (4th ed.). Aspen Publishing. ISBN 978-1543806786.
