= Syracuse Journal of International Law and Commerce =

Law review

Syracuse Journal of International Law and Commerce

First published in 1972, the Syracuse Journal of International Law and Commerce is one of the oldest student-edited international law reviews in the United States. It is published by the Syracuse University College of Law.

The journal publishes two editions annually. The editions consist of scholarly works on any number of international law topics submitted by professors, academics, and practicing attorneys. Published in each edition are three to four articles by professionals in the field, and two student notes. They may also contain a survey article and book review. The Journal has a diverse subscription base, including Europe, Asia, and Africa.

Students are selected for journal membership based on academic ranking or success in an open writing competition held at the conclusion of the first year. Members must demonstrate mastery of legal research and writing skills by submitting scholarly articles of publishable quality.
