= Walter T. Cox III =

American judge

Walter Cox

Senior Judge of the United States Court of Appeals for the Armed Forces
- Incumbent
- Assumed office September 18, 2000

Chief Judge of the United States Court of Appeals for the Armed Forces
- In office October 1, 1995 – September 30, 1999
- Preceded by: Eugene R. Sullivan
- Succeeded by: Susan J. Crawford

Judge of the United States Court of Appeals for the Armed Forces
- In office September 6, 1984 – September 18, 2000
- Appointed by: Ronald Reagan
- Preceded by: William Cook
- Succeeded by: James E. Baker

Personal details
- Born: August 13, 1942 (age 83); Anderson, South Carolina, U.S.
- Education: Clemson University (BS); University of South Carolina (JD)

Walter T. Cox III (born August 13, 1942) is an American lawyer who serves as a senior judge of the United States Court of Appeals for the Armed Forces from 1984 to 1999.

Walter Thompson Cox III was born on August 13, 1942, in Anderson, South Carolina, the son of Walter Thompson Cox, Jr., an official at Clemson University for almost fifty years. He attended D. W. Daniel High School in Clemson and became an Eagle Scout. He graduated from Clemson University with a Bachelor of Science in 1964 and from University of South Carolina School of Law in 1967. He joined the army in May 1964 and attended the Defense Language Institute and then served as the Liaison Officer to the Minister of Justice for the State of Bavaria and as the Liaison Officer to the American Embassy in Austria. He left the army in January 1973.

From his election in 1978, Cox served until 1984 as resident circuit court judge for the Tenth Judicial Circuit of South Carolina.

Cox served as a judge for 22 years on both state and federal courts. In 1984, President Ronald Reagan nominated him to the U.S. Court of Appeals for the Armed Forces. He began his service in September 1984. He was the court's chief judge from October 1, 1995 until his term ended September 30, 1999. He retired from the court on September 30, 2000.

In May 2001, he was appointed chairman of a five-person Commission on the 50th Anniversary of the Uniform Code of Military Justice created by the National Institute of Military Justice to review the courts-martial system. It recommended requiring at least 12 people on a military jury in a case where the death sentence was a possibility and that in capital cases judges give an anti-discrimination instruction to the jury. It also recommended an examination of the military's rape and sodomy codes.

In 2009, he chaired a second commission, a group of eight that made seven recommendations largely addressing the courts-martial and appeals process, as well as advocating the repeal of Article 125 of the Uniform Code of Military Justice (sodomy).

Cox teaches criminal law at the Charleston School of Law.

The Judge Advocates Association sponsors the annual Walter T. Cox III Symposium on Military History named in his honor.

The U.S. Department of Defense awarded Cox the Distinguished Civilian Service Award.

Cox is of counsel to Nelson Mullins Riley & Scarborough LLP in Charleston.

== Notes ==
Legal offices
Preceded by William Cook	Judge of the United States Court of Appeals for the Armed Forces; 1984–2000	Succeeded by James E. Baker
Preceded by Eugene R. Sullivan	Chief Judge of the United States Court of Appeals for the Armed Forces; 1995–1999	Succeeded by Susan J. Crawford
