= Institute for Security Policy and Law =

Research institute at Syracuse University

- Established: 2003; 23 years ago
- Founder: William C. Banks
- Type: Private research institution
- Headquarters: Syracuse University College of Law
- Location(s): Dineen Hall, Suite 300 950 Irving Avenue Syracuse, New York 13244 United States
- Fields: Public policy; security studies; security policy; counterterrorism
- Director: James E. Baker
- Deputy Director: Robert B. Murrett
- Parent organization: Syracuse University
- Website: securitypolicylaw.syr.edu
- Formerly called: Institute for National Security and Counterterrorism (INSCT)

The Institute for Security Policy and Law (SPL), formerly the Institute for National Security and Counterterrorism (INSCT), is an academic research institute based at Syracuse University, jointly affiliated with the Maxwell School of Citizenship and Public Affairs and the Syracuse University College of Law. Founded in 2003 by Professor William C. Banks, the institute focuses on interdisciplinary research and teaching in national and international security, counterterrorism, and related legal and policy areas.

SPL engages in academic research, policy analysis, and public service. It supports interdisciplinary education through graduate-level courses, a certificate of advanced study, and collaborative programs with domestic and international institutions.

Its faculty includes both full-time staff and affiliated professors from various departments at Syracuse University. Graduate research assistants also contribute to the institute’s work.

== Research and collaboration ==
SPL has undertaken research in areas such as homeland security, cybersecurity, and post-conflict law and governance.

Between 2013 and 2018, SPL participated in a joint fellowship program with the International Institute for Counter-Terrorism at Interdisciplinary Center Herzliya in Israel, focusing on security issues in the Middle East.

== Leadership ==
- James E. Baker serves as the current director. He is a former Chief Judge of the United States Court of Appeals for the Armed Forces and holds academic appointments in law and public administration at Syracuse University.
- William C. Banks, the founding director, is Professor Emeritus of Law and Public Administration.
- Robert B. Murrett, deputy director, is a retired U.S. Navy vice admiral and former director of the National Geospatial-Intelligence Agency.

== Publications ==
The institute is affiliated with the Journal of National Security Law and Policy, a semi-annual peer-reviewed journal. Initially co-published with the University of the Pacific’s McGeorge School of Law, it began an editorial collaboration with Georgetown Law in 2011.
