= Kent John Chabotar =

American academic administrator and political scientist

Kent John Chabotar (born October 7, 1946) is an American political scientist and academic administrator. He was a professor of political science and president of Guilford College from 2002 to 2014.

== Biography ==
=== Education ===
Chabotar was born in New York City. He graduated magna cum laude from Saint Francis University in Loretto, Pa., in 1968 with a bachelor of arts degree in political science. He served two terms as student government president. He earned a master of public administration degree with distinction and doctor of philosophy degree in public administration from the Maxwell School of Citizenship and Public Affairs of Syracuse University in 1969 and 1973, respectively.

=== Career and achievements ===
Chabotar went on to Michigan State University where he was an assistant professor of political science from 1972-75. There he received the school's Distinguished Educator Award for teaching excellence in 1973. The next year he was honored by the Michigan Legislature for his development of public administration programs. In 1975, Chabotar was a charter faculty member for the College of Professional Studies at the University of Massachusetts Boston.

In the 1980s, Chabotar became a lecturer and faculty member at Harvard University's the Graduate School of Education, eventually receiving the school's Fussa Distinguished Teaching Award in 1988. From 1984–86, he served as chief financial officer for The Williamson Group of Cambridge, Mass., a start-up computer services company. Additionally, he was vice president and treasurer at Education Development Center, Inc., of Newton, Mass., a worldwide nonprofit educational research firm from 1986-89.

Chabotar later served as vice president for finance and administration and treasurer at Bowdoin College in Brunswick, Maine from 1991-02 where he was subsequently honored by the Maine Legislature on the 25th anniversary of his college teaching. Bowdoin students established the Kent John Chabotar Scholarship Fund in 2002. He received the Distinguished Alumnus Award in Education from St. Francis University in 2003, and the Academic Leadership Award from the Council of Independent Colleges in 2003.

Chabotar is a member of the commission on Southern Association of Colleges and Schools and a member of the board of directors for the Council of Independent Colleges. He has authored or co-authored books, as well as numerous journal articles and monographs.
