= James E. Baker =

American judge (born 1960)

James Baker
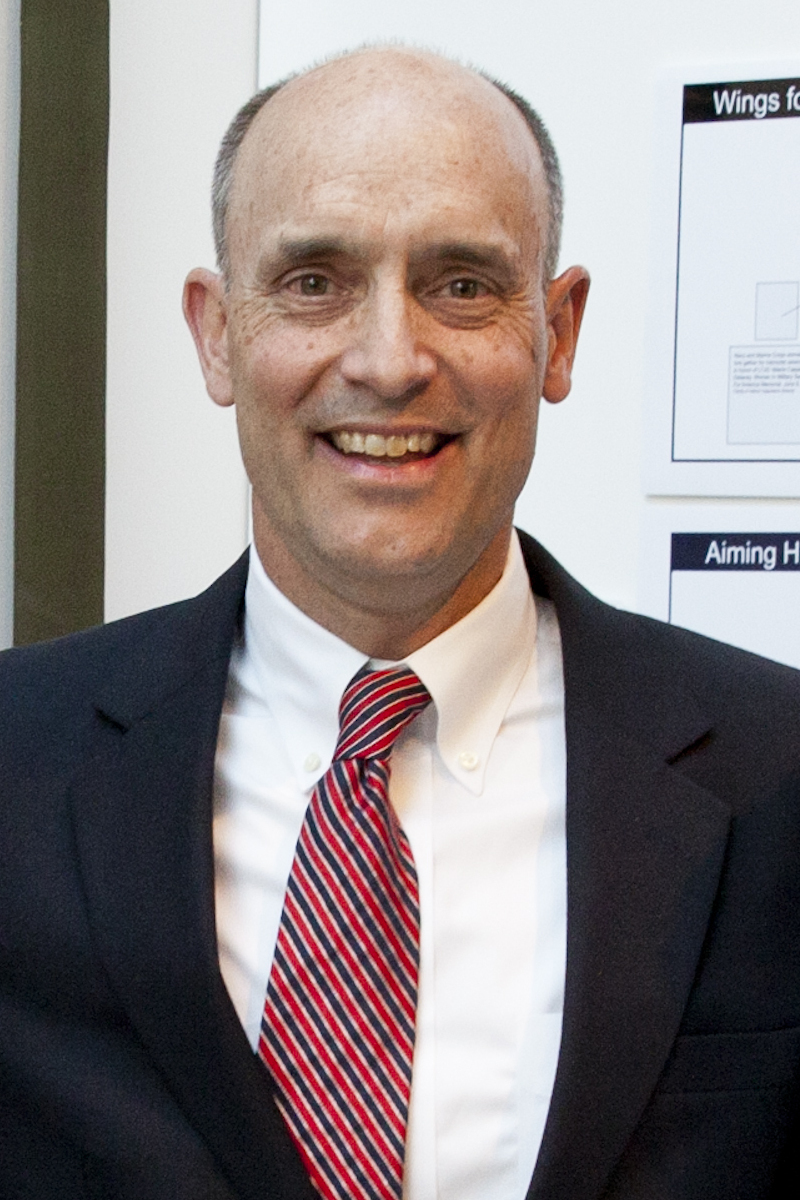
- James Baker in 2014

Senior Judge of the United States Court of Appeals for the Armed Forces
- Incumbent
- Assumed office July 31, 2015

Chief Judge of the United States Court of Appeals for the Armed Forces
- In office October 1, 2011 – July 31, 2015
- Preceded by: Andrew S. Effron
- Succeeded by: Charles E. Erdmann

Judge of the United States Court of Appeals for the Armed Forces
- In office September 19, 2000 – July 31, 2015
- Appointed by: Bill Clinton
- Preceded by: Walter T. Cox III
- Succeeded by: John E. Sparks

Personal details
- Born: James Edgar Baker; March 25, 1960 (age 66) New Haven, Connecticut, U.S.
- Education: Yale University (BA, JD)

Military service
- Branch/service: United States Marine Corps
- Years of service: 1979–2000
- Awards: Navy Achievement Medal (2)

James Edgar Baker (born March 25, 1960) is an American attorney, judge, and academic. He is the former Chief Judge of the United States Court of Appeals for the Armed Forces. He was appointed to the Court on September 19, 2000, by President Bill Clinton, and became its Chief Judge upon the expiration of Andrew S. Effron's term on September 30, 2011. He is currently a professor of Law and Public Administration at Syracuse University and Director of the Institute for Security Policy and Law. Baker is a Fellow of the National Academy of Public Administration.

== Early life and education ==
Baker was born in New Haven, Connecticut and grew up in Cambridge, Massachusetts. He graduated from Yale College with a BA in 1982 and Yale Law School with a JD in 1990.

== Career ==
Following college, Baker served in the United States Marine Corps as an Infantry officer. He resigned from the Reserves as an Infantry officer in 2000 upon joining the U.S. Court of Appeals for the Armed Forces. Judge Baker has also served as a legislative aide and Acting Chief of Staff to the late Sen. Daniel Patrick Moynihan of New York.

Prior to his judgeship, Baker was a legal advisor at the U.S. Department of State where he provided legal advice on law enforcement, intelligence, and counter-terrorism issues, and served as counsel to delegations to various environmental negotiations. He was the Deputy Legal Advisor to the National Security Council from 1994 to 1997, and Counsel to the President's Intelligence Advisory Board and Intelligence Oversight Board in 1993. From 1997 to 2000, he was a Special Assistant to President Bill Clinton and Legal Advisor to the National Security Council. At the NSC, Judge Baker advised the President, the National Security Advisor, and the National Security Council staff on national security law.

On June 22, 2016, President Barack Obama appointed Baker to the Public Interest Declassification Board.

Baker has previously taught at Georgetown University Law Center, the University of Iowa College of Law, Yale Law School, and the University of Pittsburgh School of Law.

He joined the faculty of Syracuse University's College of Law and Maxwell School of Citizenship and Public Affairs as a professor of Law and Public Administration in Fall 2018. Baker was also appointed the Director of the Institute for Security Policy and Law, succeeding William C. Banks, who founded the Institute in 2003.

Baker is the Chair of the American Bar Association's Standing Committee on Law and National Security, as well as member of the editorial board of the Journal of National Security Law & Policy and Intelligence and National Security.

== Honors and recognition ==
Baker is the recipient of the 1999 Colonel Nelson Drew Award, the NSC's highest honor, in recognition of his "distinguished contributions to the formation of peaceful, cooperative relationships between states, and U.S. security policy for global peace."

He is a recipient of the "Director's Award", given by the Director of Central Intelligence, in recognition of "superior contributions in the fields of intelligence and national security".

In 2009, the U.S. Army Command and General Staff College awarded Judge Baker the honorary degree of Master of Military Art and Science.

== Writings ==
- Regulating covert action. New Haven, Connecticut: Yale University Press. 1992. ISBN 9780300176940. OCLC 26307724.
- In the Common Defense: National Security Law for Perilous Times (Hardback). Cambridge: Cambridge University Press. May 2007. ISBN 9780521877633. OCLC 862759513.
- The Centaur's Dilemma: National Security Law for the Coming AI Revolution. Washington, DC: Brookings Institution Press. December 2020. ISBN 9780815738008. OCLC 1110685320.

Legal offices
Preceded by Walter T. Cox III	Judge of the United States Court of Appeals for the Armed Forces; 2000–2015	Succeeded by John E. Sparks
