= James Baker-Jarvis =

American applied physicist

- Born: James Roger Baker; February 8, 1950; Lauderdale, Minnesota, U.S.
- Died: December 31, 2011 (aged 61); Lyons, Colorado, U.S.
- Education: University of Minnesota; University of Wyoming
- Known for: Baker-Jarvis method
- Spouse: Karen Baker-Jarvis
- Children: 2
- Scientific career
- Fields: Physics; Metrology; Materials science
- Workplaces: University of Wyoming; North Dakota State University; National Institute of Standards and Technology
- Thesis: Heat conduction in heterogeneous media and volumetric heating of oil shales by electromagnetic methods (1984)
- Doctoral advisor: Ramarao Inguva

James Roger Baker-Jarvis (né Baker; February 8, 1950 — December 31, 2011) was an American applied physicist and metrologist who was a research scientist at the Electromagnetics Division at National Institute of Standards and Technology (NIST). He is best known for his contribution to the metrology of dielectric properties of materials in microwave frequencies.

== Biography ==
James Roger Baker-Jarvis was born on February 8, 1950, in Lauderdale, Minnesota. He received B.S. degree in mathematics and M.S. degree in physics from University of Minnesota in 1975 and 1980, respectively. He pursued his doctoral studies in University of Wyoming and obtained a PhD. degree in theoretical physics in 1984. His post-doctoral work concerned dielectric measurements and electromagnetic fields in lossy media. Spending two years as an assistant professor at University of Wyoming, he then moved to North Dakota State University, where he was an assistant professor of physics and worked on electromagnetic heating processes and maximum entropy methods. In 1989, he joined National Institute of Standards and Technology (NIST), where he spent the remainder of his career and was the leader of Electromagnetic Properties of Materials Project.

Baker-Jarvis' research work at NIST focused on microwave dielectric properties of materials and nondestructive evaluation. ASTM Standard 5568 for dielectric metrology techniques was largely based on his work on coaxial cable measurements. An iterative measurement technique measurement technique introduced by Baker-Jarvis and his colleagues is known as Baker-Jarvis algorithm or NIST iterative method. In 2010, he was named a fellow member of IEEE for "contributions to dielectric measurement and analysis of microwave measurement structures."

Baker-Jarvis was married to Karen Baker-Jarvis, whom he met at University of Minnesota. They took on a hyphenated surname. He died on December 31, 2011, following an automobile accident, and was survived by his wife and two children.

== Selected publications ==
Journal articles

- Baker-Jarvis, James; Racine, Michael; Alameddine, Jihad (1989). "Solving differential equations by a maximum entropy–minimum norm method with applications to Fokker–Planck equations". Journal of Mathematical Physics. 30 (7): 1459–1463. Bibcode:1989JMP....30.1459B. doi:10.1063/1.528276.
- Hansen, Andrew C.; Baker-Jarvis, James (August 1990). "A rate dependent kinetic theory of fracture for polymers". International Journal of Fracture. 44 (3): 221–231. doi:10.1007/BF00035518.
- Baker-Jarvis, J.; Vanzura, E. J.; Kissick, W. A. (August 1990). "Improved technique for determining complex permittivity with the transmission/reflection method". IEEE Transactions on Microwave Theory and Techniques. 38 (8): 1096–1103. Bibcode:1990ITMTT..38.1096B. doi:10.1109/22.57336.
- Baker-Jarvis, J.; Janezic, M. D.; Domich, P. D.; Geyer, R. G. (October 1994). "Analysis of an open-ended coaxial probe with lift-off for nondestructive testing". IEEE Transactions on Instrumentation and Measurement. 43 (5): 711–718. Bibcode:1994ITIM...43..711B. doi:10.1109/19.328897.
- Krupka, Jerzy; Derzakowski, Krzysztof; Riddle, Bill; Baker-Jarvis, James (1998). "A dielectric resonator for measurements of complex permittivity of low loss dielectric materials as a function of temperature". Measurement Science and Technology. 9 (10): 1751. Bibcode:1998MeScT...9.1751K. doi:10.1088/0957-0233/9/10/015.
- Riddle, B.; Baker-Jarvis, J.; Krupka, J. (March 2003). "Complex permittivity measurements of common plastics over variable temperatures". IEEE Transactions on Microwave Theory and Techniques. 51 (3): 727–733. Bibcode:2003ITMTT..51..727R. doi:10.1109/TMTT.2003.808730.
- Holloway, C. L.; Kuester, E. F.; Baker-Jarvis, J.; Kabos, P. (October 2003). "A double negative (DNG) composite medium composed of magnetodielectric spherical particles embedded in a matrix". IEEE Transactions on Antennas and Propagation. 51 (10): 2596–2603. Bibcode:2003ITAP...51.2596H. doi:10.1109/TAP.2003.817563.
- Baker-Jarvis, James; Kim, Sung (2012). "The interaction of radio-frequency fields with dielectric materials at macroscopic to mesoscopic scales". Journal of Research of the National Institute of Standards and Technology. 117: 1–60. doi:10.6028/jres.117.001. PMC 4553869. PMID 26900513.

Technical reports

- Baker-Jarvis, James; Janezic, Michael D.; Grosvenor, Jr., John H.; Geyer, Richard G. (1993). Transmission/Reflection and short-circuit line methods for measuring permittivity and permeability (PDF) (Report). National Institute of Standards and Technology. NIST Technical Note 1355-R.
