= 1976 Missouri Attorney General election =

- November 2, 1976
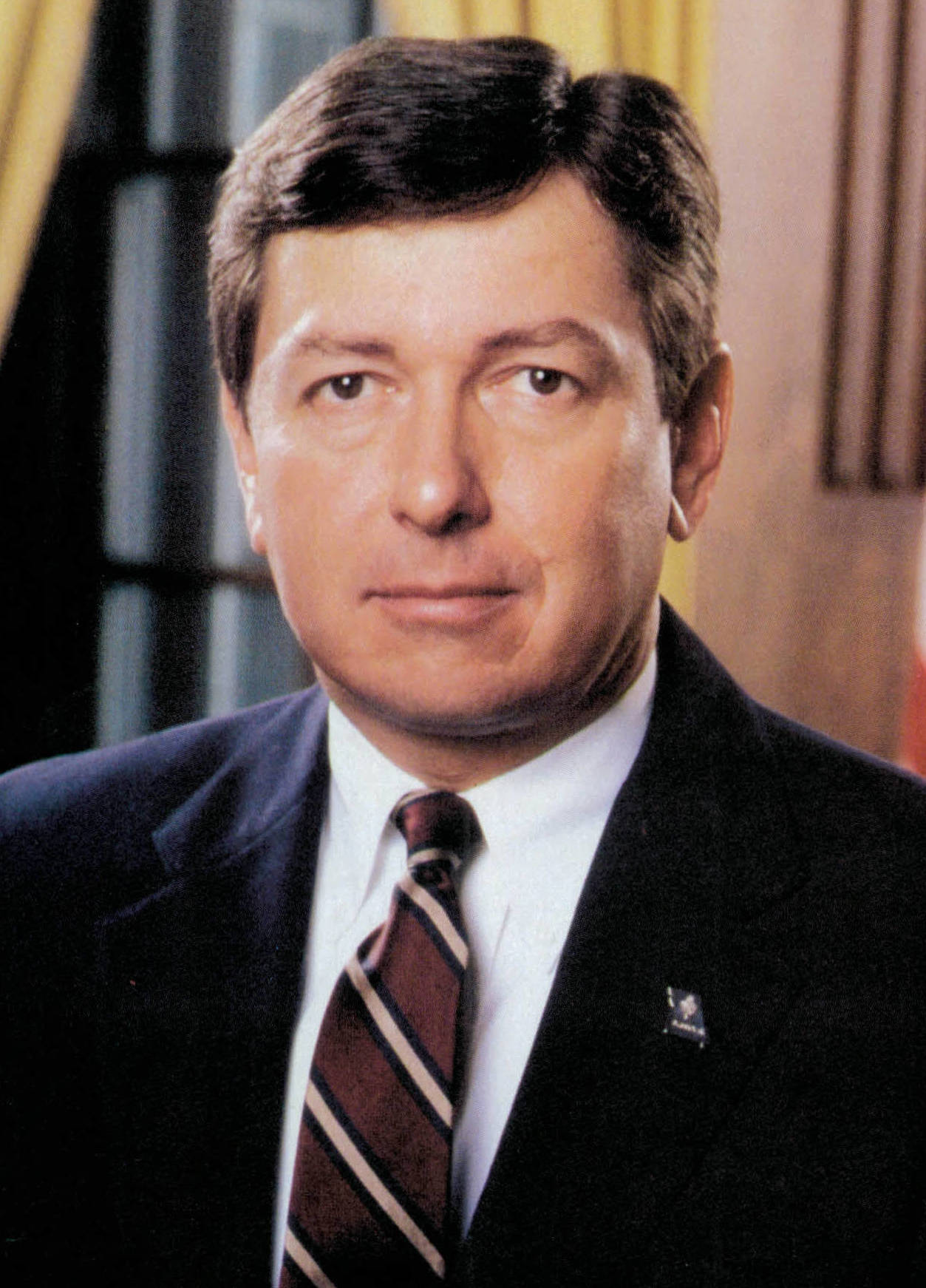

| Nominee | John Ashcroft | James G. Baker |
| Party | Republican | Democratic |
| Popular vote | 961,782 | 916,163 |
| Percentage | 51.22% | 48.78% |
Attorney General before election
John Danforth
Republican
Elected Attorney General
John Ashcroft
Republican

The 1976 Missouri Attorney General election was held on November 2, 1976, in order to elect the attorney general of Missouri. Republican nominee and former state auditor of Missouri John Ashcroft defeated Democratic nominee and incumbent member of the Missouri House of Representatives James G. Baker.

== General election ==
On election day, November 2, 1976, Republican nominee John Ashcroft won the election by a margin of 45,619 votes against his opponent Democratic nominee James G. Baker, thereby retaining Republican control over the office of attorney general. Ashcroft was sworn in as the 38th attorney general of Missouri on January 10, 1977.

=== Results ===
Missouri Attorney General election, 1976
| Party | Candidate | Votes | % |
|---|---|---|---|
| Republican | John Ashcroft | 961,782 | 51.22 |
| Democratic | James G. Baker | 916,163 | 48.78 |
| Total votes | | 1,877,945 | 100.00 |
| Republican hold | | | |

== See also ==
- 1976 Missouri gubernatorial election
