= Jimmy Baker (American artist) =

American academic

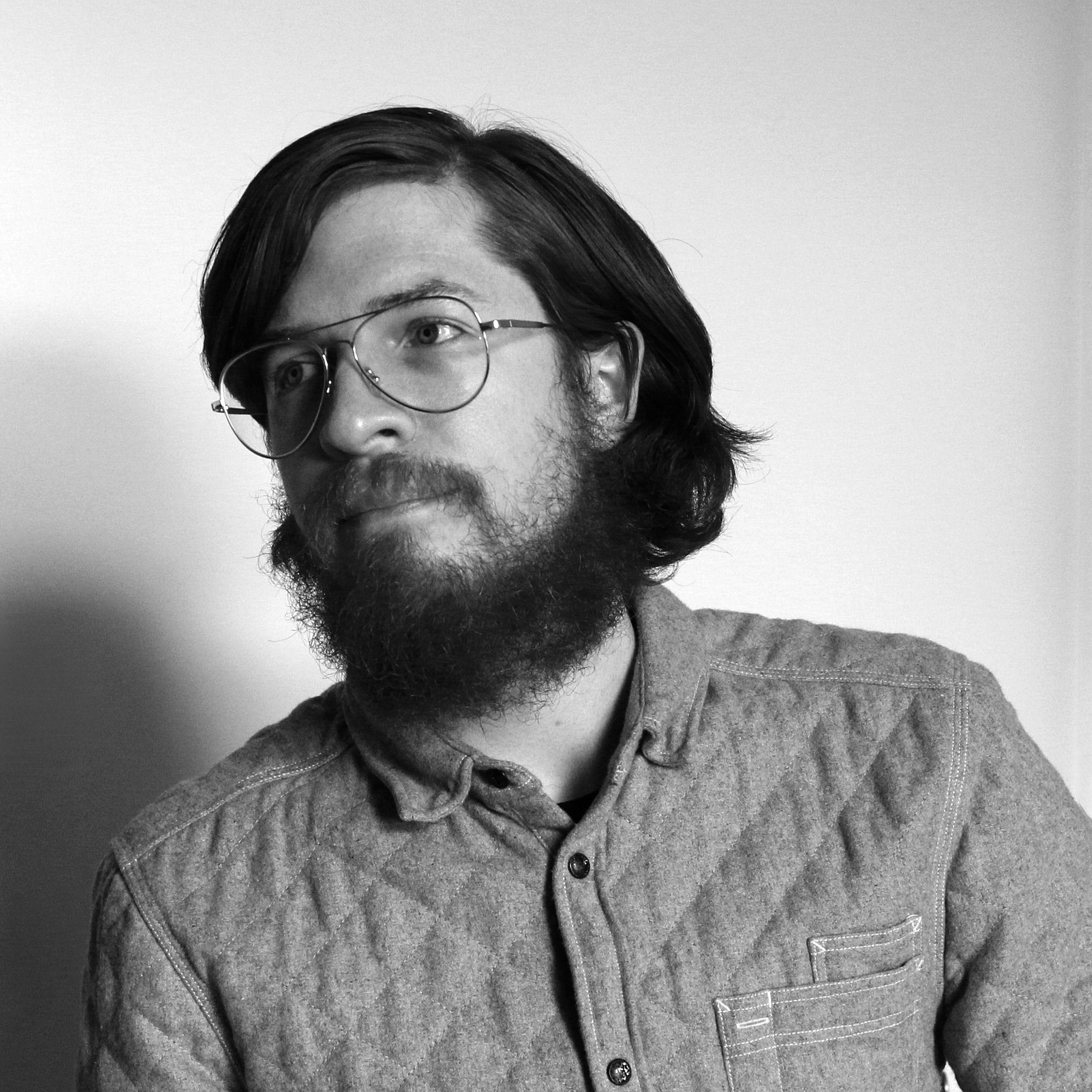
- Born: 1980 (age 45–46); Dover, Ohio
- Education: CCAD
- Known for: Painting

Jimmy Baker (born 1980 in Dover, Ohio) is an associate professor in the Studio Department at the Art Academy of Cincinnati. He has exhibited work in New York, Los Angeles, Paris, London, Basel, Miami, Chicago, Dallas, and other American cities. His work has been featured in many publications, private collections, as well as permanent collections at the Crystal Bridges Museum of American Art, Zabludowicz Art Trust London, Taschen Foundation Berlin, Cincinnati Art Museum, Columbus Museum of Art, JP Morgan Chase Collection, and Progressive Insurance Collection.

== Education ==
- 2002 BFA Columbus College of Art and Design
- 2004 MFA University of Cincinnati

== Recent paintings ==
In late 2010 Jimmy Baker began using a digital printing process that utilizes UV cured ink, which is sprayed overtop of the oil painted surface on his paintings. The large format commercial printer is able to print on large canvases, and print over impasto paint.

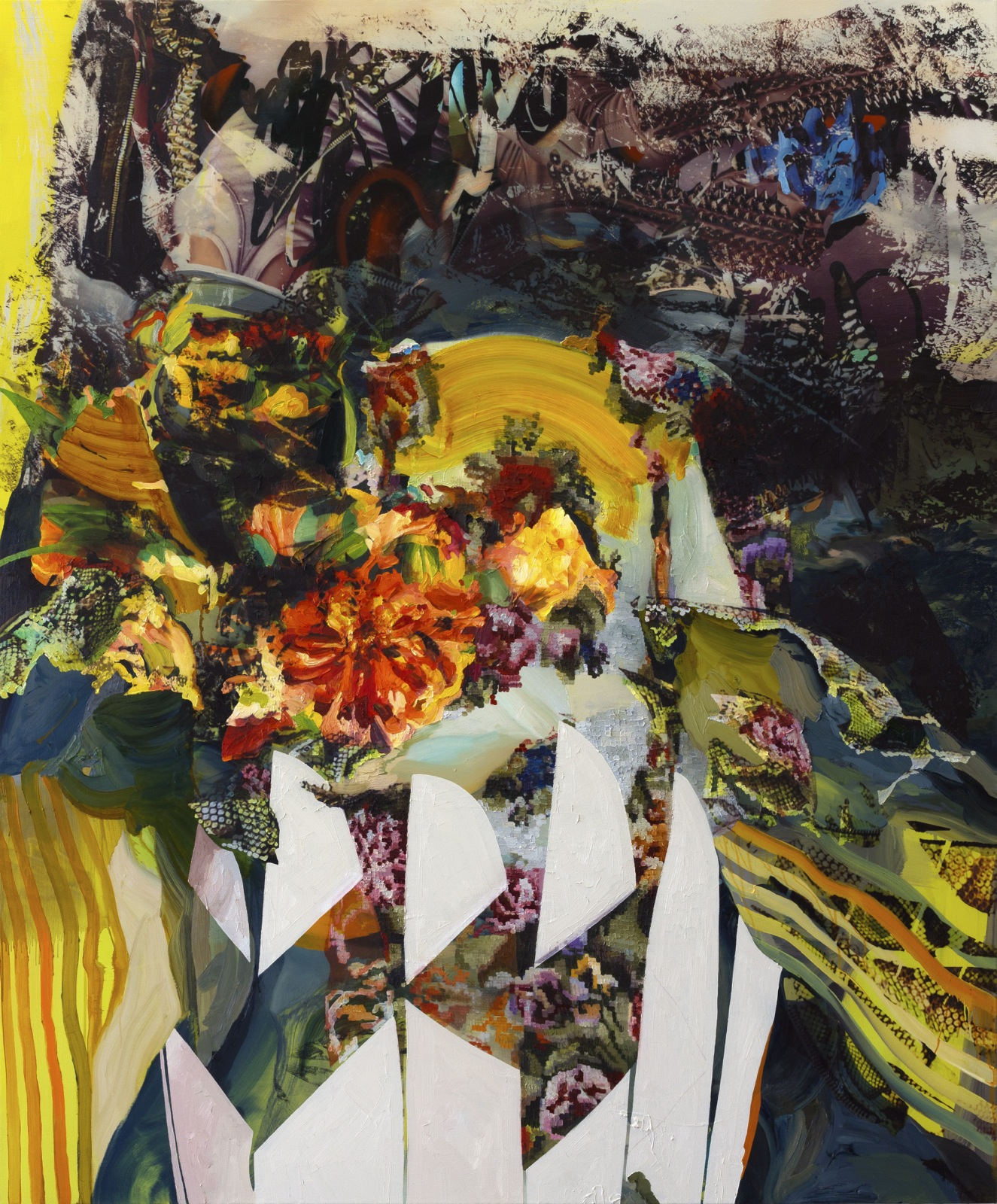

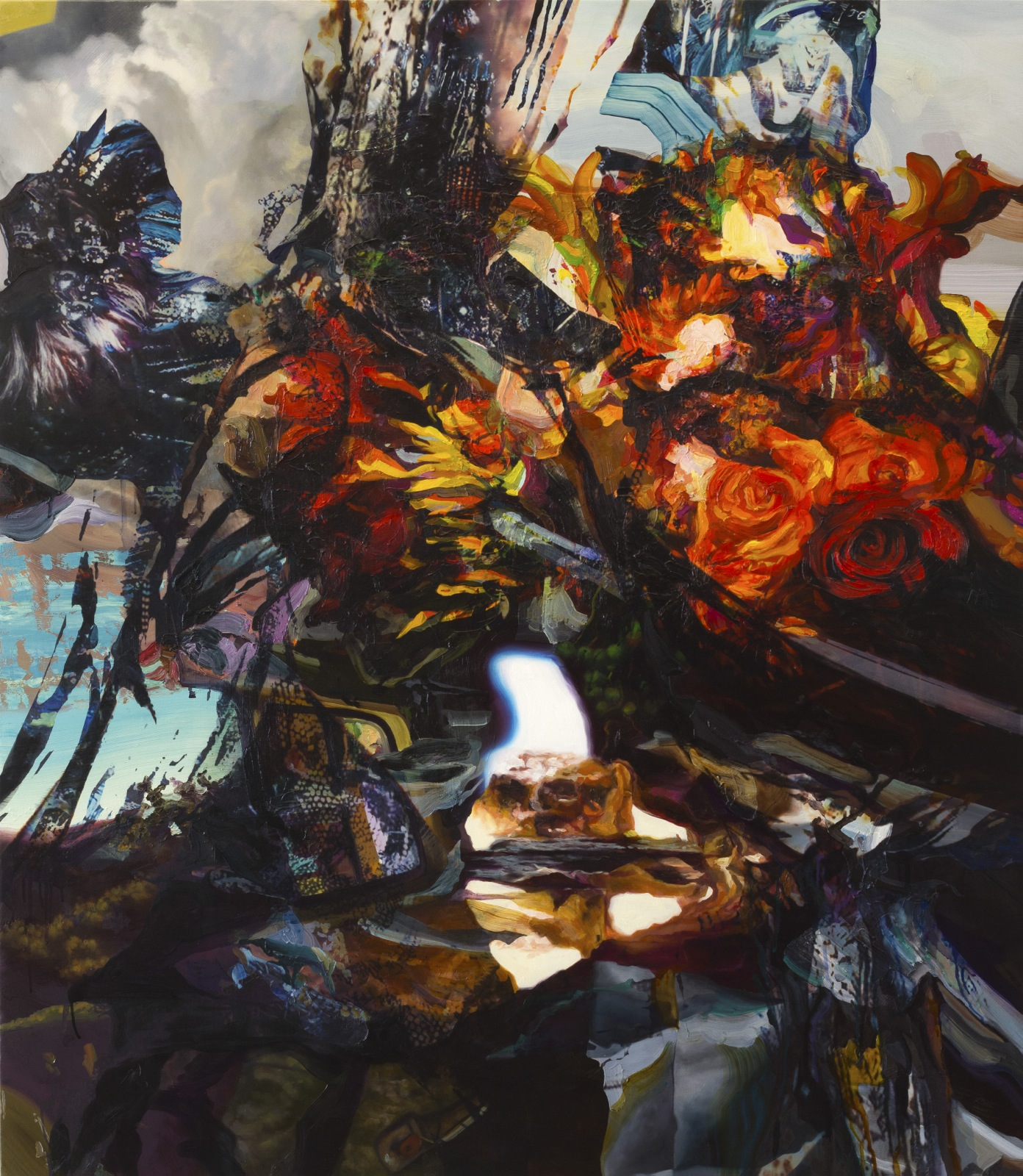

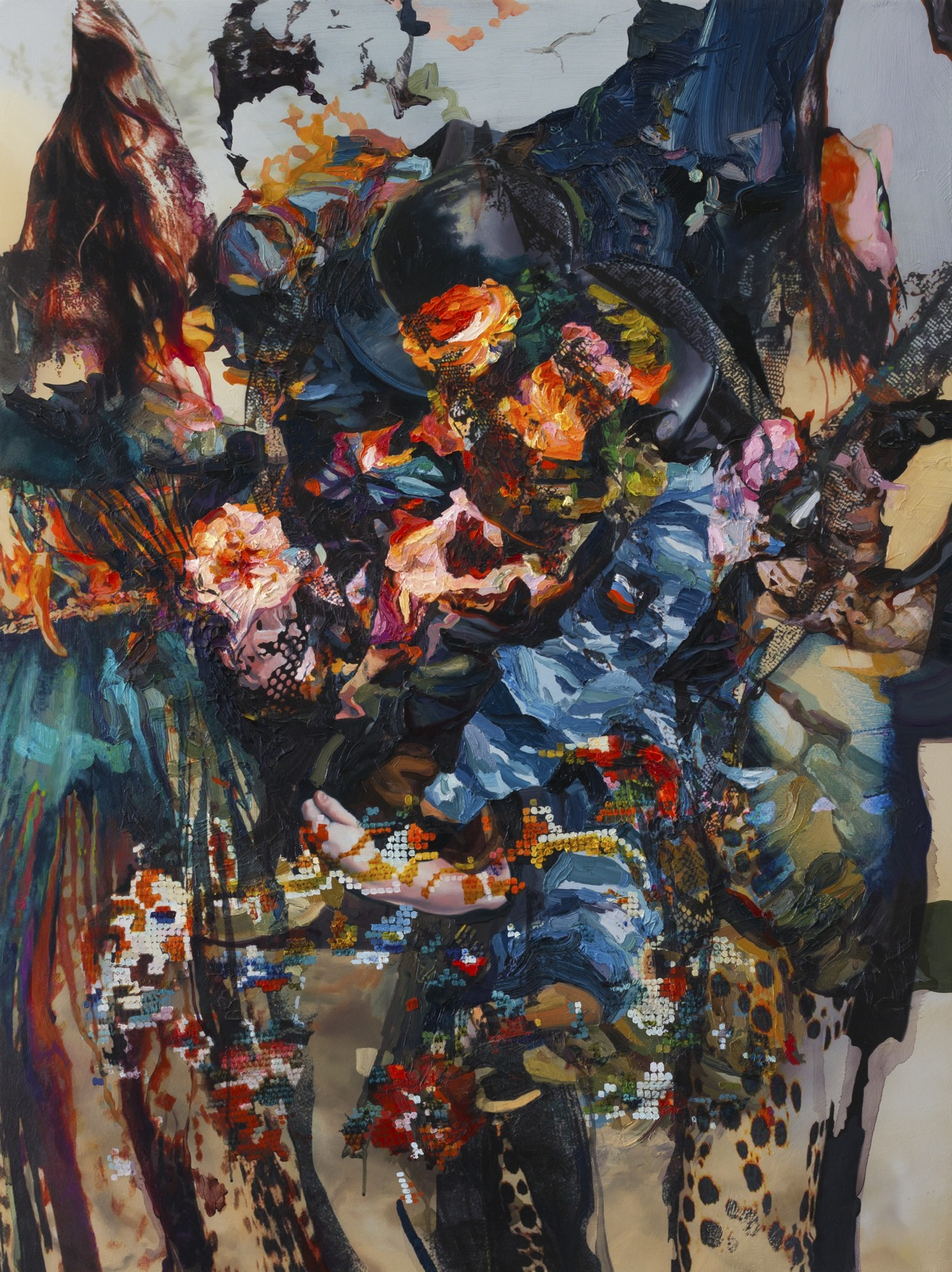

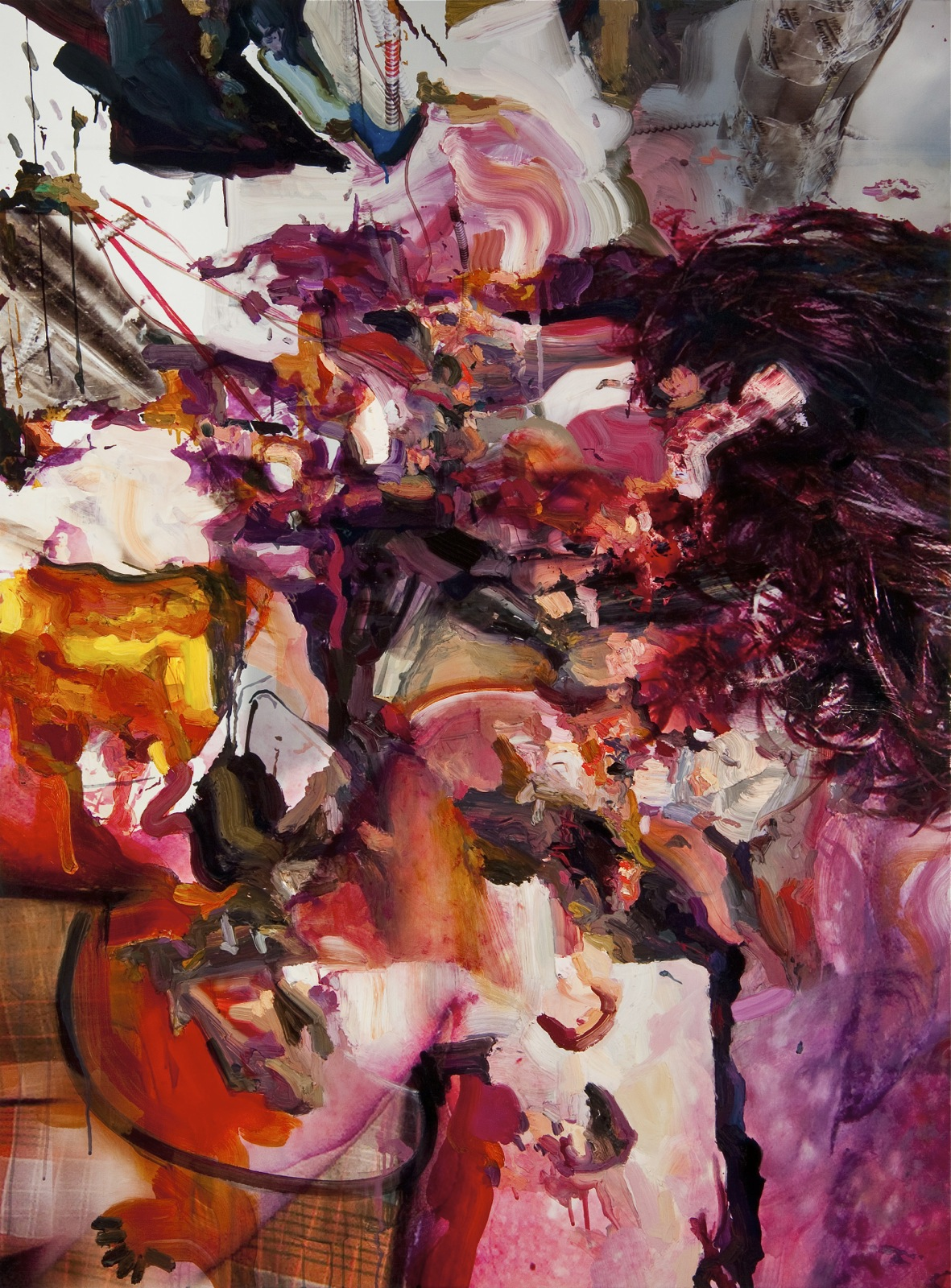

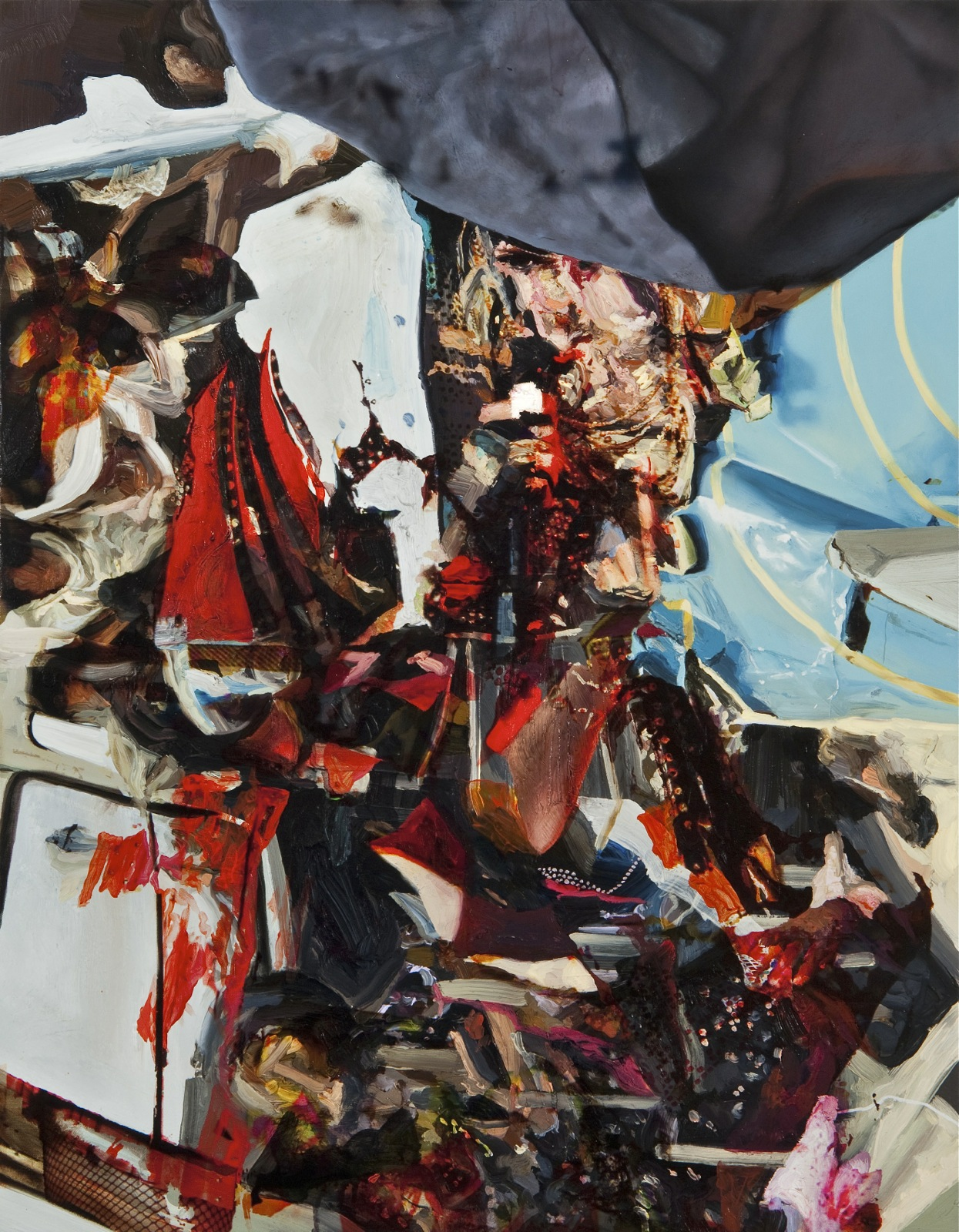

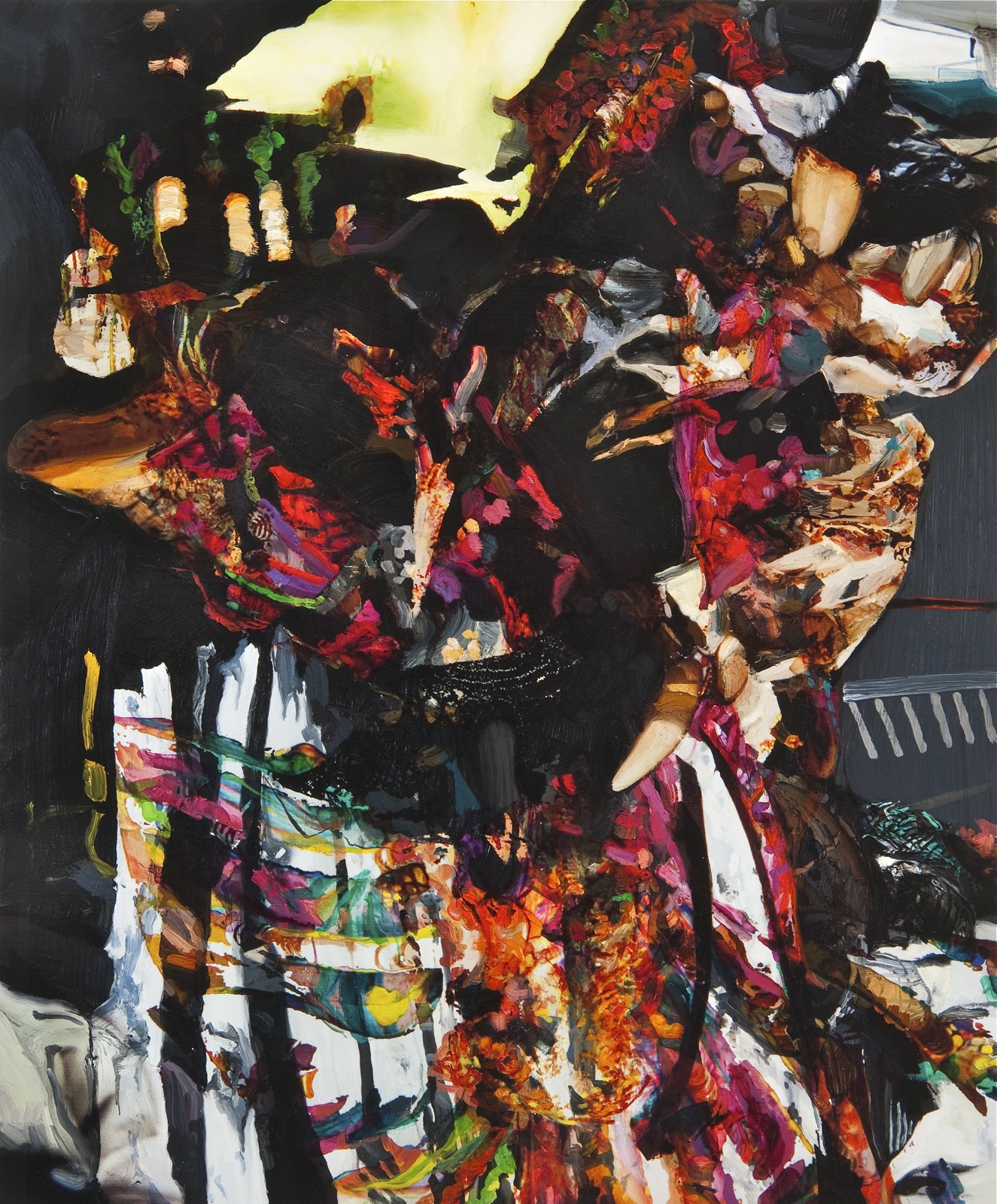

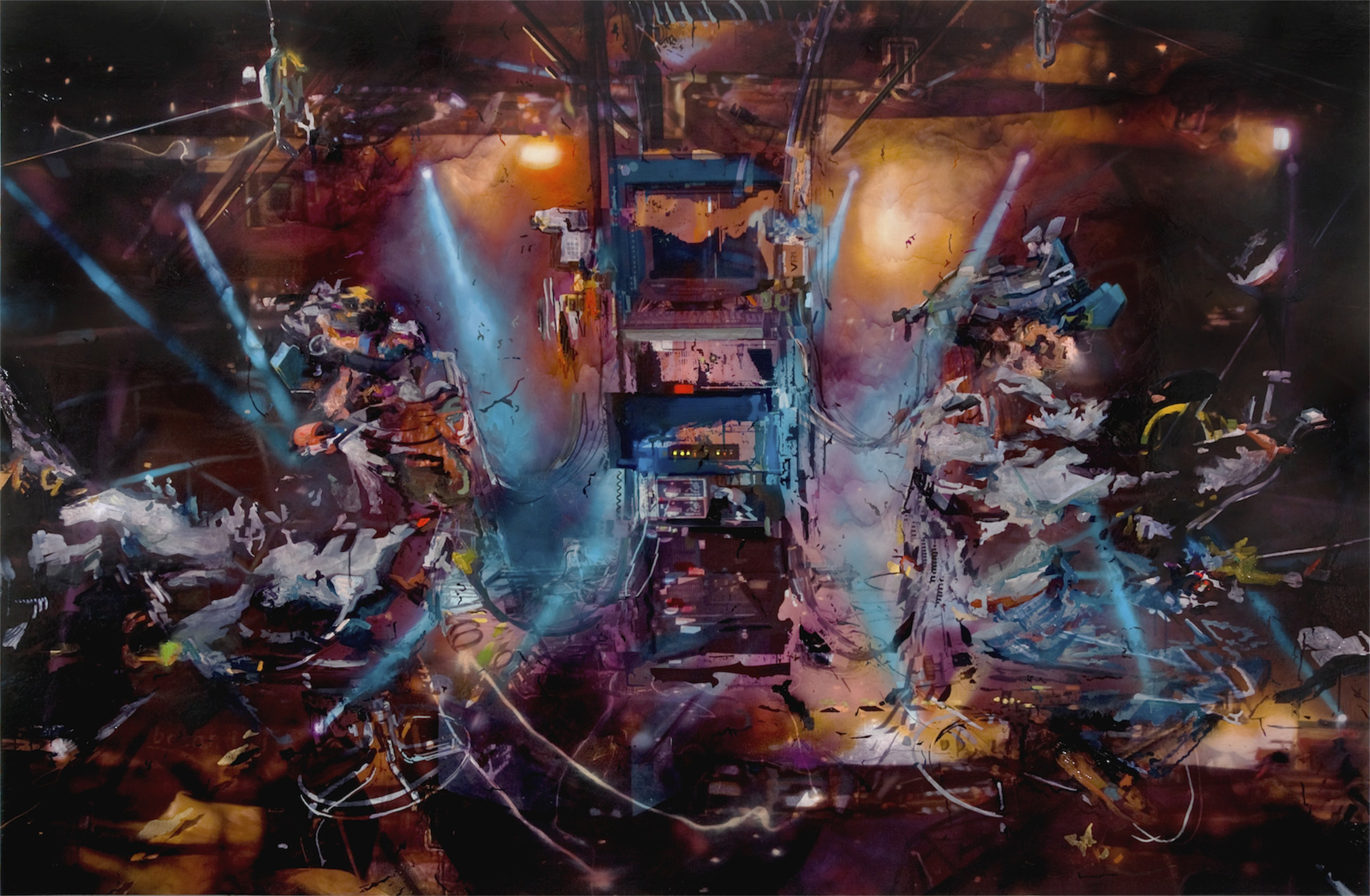

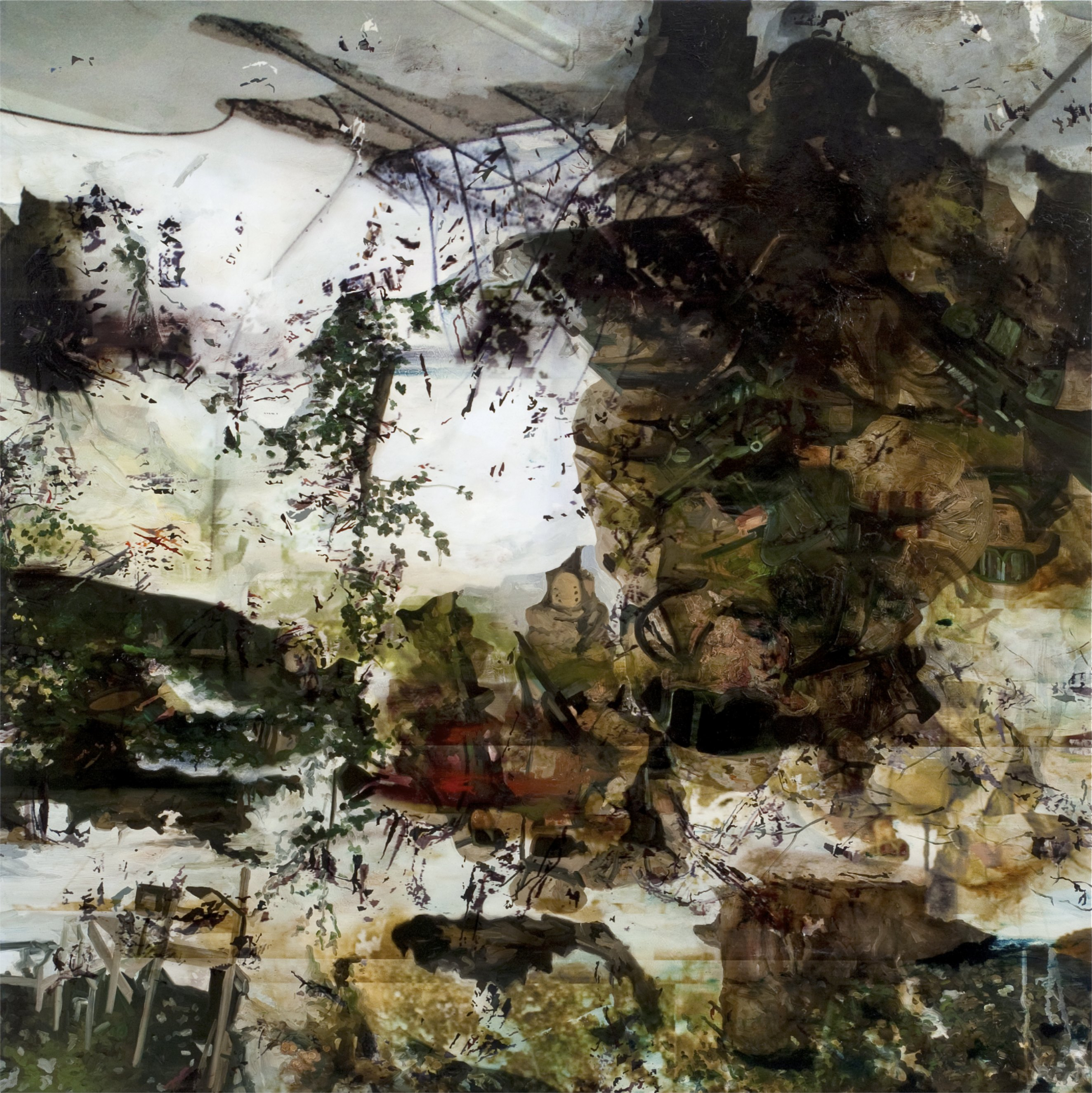

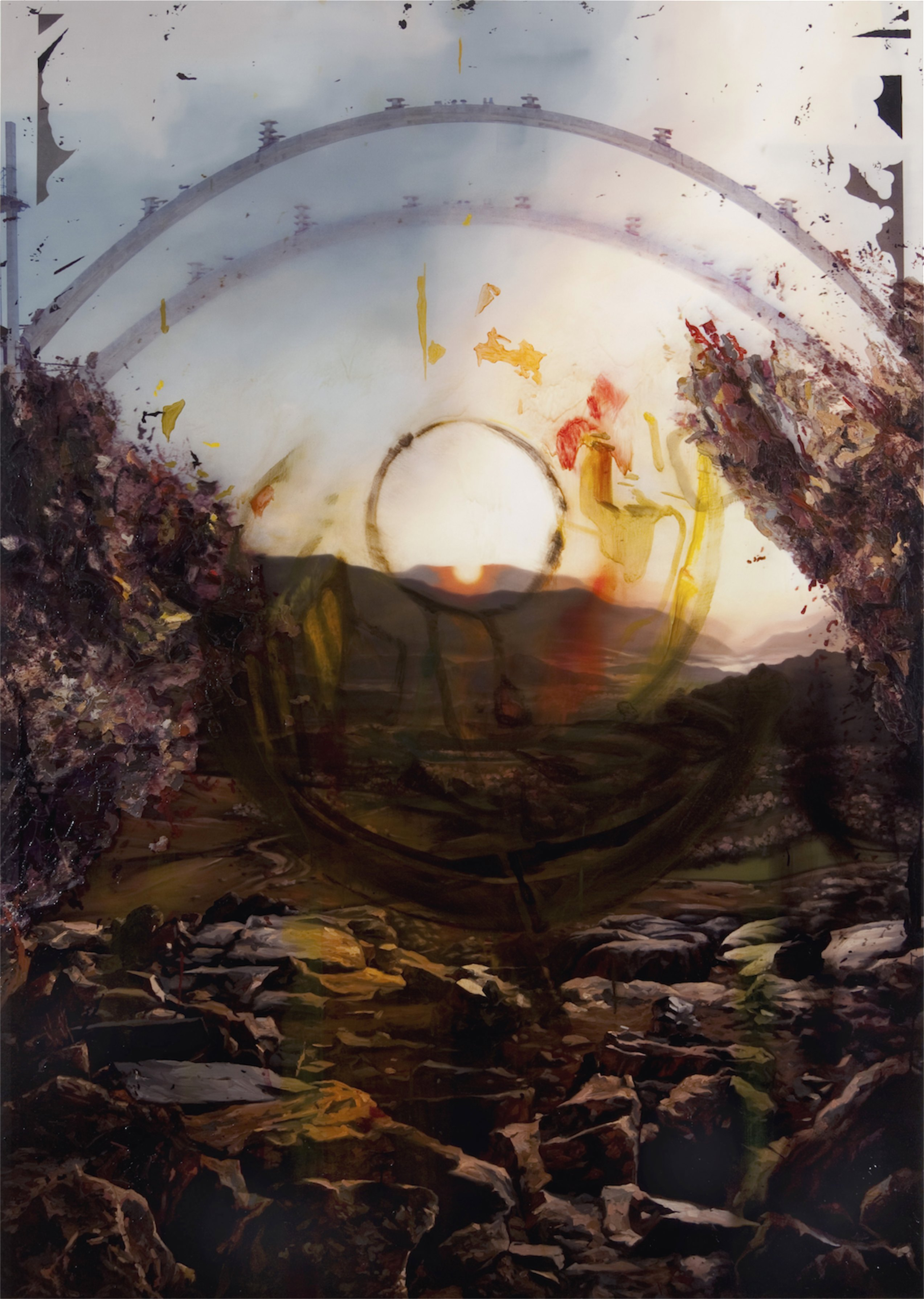

== Selected solo and two-person exhibitions ==
- 2018 Within Between, with Tatiana Kronberg, LMAK Gallery, New York, NY
- 2015 Phantom Eye: Jimmy Baker & Matthew Hillock, Zhulong Gallery, Dallas, TX
- 2015 SUNGAZERS, Shaheen Modern & Contemporary, Cleveland, OH
- 2012 Holding Pattern, Shaheen Contemporary, Cleveland, OH
- 2011 Remote Viewing, Contemporary Arts Center, Cincinnati, OH
- 2010 Sentinel, Roberts & Tilton, Los Angeles, CA
- 2010 Event Horizon, New Galerie de France, Paris
- 2008 Civil Dusk, Foxy Production, New York, NY
- 2008 LISTE, Foxy Production. Basel, Switzerland
- 2008 Hairrier with Nathan Tersteeg, Weston Art Gallery, Cincinnati, OH
- 2007 True Diplomacy with Jil Baker, Western Exhibitions, Chicago, Illinois
- 2007 Rapture, Roberts and Tilton, Los Angeles, CA
- 2006 The Captives, Foxy Production, New York, NY
- 2006 Challenges, Weston-Bolling Gallery, Cincinnati, OH

== Selected group exhibitions ==
- 2018 Wide Angle, Foot Focus Biennial, Weston Art Gallery, Cincinnati, OH
- 2018 Assemblage & Collage, Elizabeth Leach Gallery, Portland, OR
- 2017 All or Nothing, Crystal Bridges Museum of American Art, Bentonville, AR
- 2017 Zing Zam Blunder, curated by Brian Scott Campbell, Harbinger Projects, Reykjavík, Iceland
- 2017 Double Edged, Circuit 12, Dallas, TX
- 2017 State of the Art: Discovering American Art Now, The Mint Museum in Charlotte, NC
- 2017 State of the Art: Discovering American Art Now, Frist Center for the Visual Arts in Nashville, TN
- 2017 State of the Art: Discovering American Art Now, Dixon Gallery and Gardens in Memphis, TN
- 2017-2016 Fiction II, Raygun Projects, Toowoomba, Australia; Volunteer State Community College, Nashville, TN; Apothecary, Chattanooga, TN; CLASS ROOM, Coventry, England; Elgin Community College, Elgin, Illinois; Angelika Studios, High Wycombe, England; Boecker Contemporary, Heidelberg, Germany; Divisible, Dayton, OH
- 2016 Formal Function: Strategies in Abstraction, Carnegie Arts Center, Covington, KY
- 2016 State of the Art: Discovering American Art Now, Minneapolis Institute of Art, Minneapolis, MN
- 2016 State of the Art: Discovering American Art Now, Telfair Museums, Savannah, GA
- 2016 Gimmie Gimmie Gimmie, curated by Todd Pavlisko, Weston Art Gallery, Cincinnati, OH
- 2014 State of the Art: Discovering American Art Now, Crystal Bridges Museum of American Art, Bentonville, AR
- 2014 Collection Gilles Balmet, Ecole Superieure d’Art Design, Grenoble, France
- 2013 Reverb: Recent Abstract Painting, University of Northern Iowa, IA
- 2012 Black Foliage, Nudashank, Baltimore MD
- 2012 Good Morning, Captain, Land of Tomorrow, Louisville, KY
- 2011 Strange Beauty, IDEA Space, Colorado College, CO
- 2010 Wild Thing, Roberts & Tilton, Los Angeles, CA
- 2010 Baker, Braunig, Gokita, Hopkins, Foxy Production, New York, NY
- 2010 The Library of Babel / In and Out of Place, Project Space 176, London, UK
- 2010 Shapeshifter, Country Club Projects, Cincinnati, OH
- 2008 Macrocosm, Roberts & Tilton, Los Angeles, CA
- 2008 Uncoordinated, Contemporary Arts Center, Cincinnati, OH
- 2008 Face Forward: Portraiture in Contemporary Art, Columbia University, New York, NY
- 2007 An Aside, Zoo Art Fair with Project Space 176, London, England
- 2006 Sea Change, Roberts & Tilton, Los Angeles, CA
- 2006 25 Bold Moves, emerging artist exhibit, House of Campari, Los Angeles, CA
- 2006 Now, More Than Ever, Foxy Production, New York, NY
- 2005 Five Solo Shows, Western Exhibitions, Chicago, Illinois
- 2005 Frontier, Roberts and Tilton, Los Angeles, CA
- 2005 Contemporary Art in the Midwest: 2005 DePauw Biennial, Greencastle, IN
- 2004 Infinite Fill, Foxy Production, New York, NY
- 2004 Despite the Sun, Foxy Production, New York, NY

== Selected bibliography ==
- 2016 Pothole, 210pp Risographic Print, by Special Collections Press
- 2016 Formal Function Review, by Fran Watson, Aeqai
- 2015 Jimmy Baker and Matthew Hillock at Zhulong Gallery, by Colette Copeland, Glasstire
- 2015 Nakid Magazine Interview
- 2014 State of the Art, by Maria Seda-Reeder, Citybeat
- 2014 Artists Baker, Hammonds part of national exhibition, by Julie Engebrecht, Cincinnati Enquirer
- 2012 Jimmy Baker Revisited, by Brittany Zagoria, Beautiful/Decay
- 2012 Jimmy Baker, by Douglas Sandhage, Best Magazine
- 2011 Jimmy Baker's Double Tillman, Pedro Velez, Artnet.com Magazine, May
- 2011 Jimmy Baker: Remote Viewing, Jane Durrell, Aeqai.com
- 2011 Northside Artist Challenges Minds, Lauren Bishop, Cincinnati Enquirer
- 2011 Cincinnati Kid, Kathy Y. Wilson, Cincinnati Magazine, February 2011 pg. 68-71
- 2010 The Library of Babel / In and Out of Place, exhibition catalog, Anna-Catharina Gebbers, Project Space 176 London
- 2010 Romantique Digital, Charles Barachon, Technikart, February pg.100
- 2010 Telerama No.3135, February 10
- 2008 Layering Landscapes, NY Arts Magazine, September/October.
- 2008 Atlas Sung, Laura James, City Beat, June 18.
- 2008 Face Forward: Portraiture in Contemporary Art, Exhibition Catalog, Seth Scantlen.
- 2007 Critic Picks, Michelle Grabner, Artforum.com, September.
- 2007 Seeing In The Dark, Jason Foumberg, New City Chicago, September 27.
- 2007 Critic's Choice, Bert Stabler, Chicago Reader, September 21.
- 2007 Jimmy Baker, Eve Wood, Art US, Issue 19, 2–23 June pg.7.
- 2007 Considering the End of the World, Christopher Knight, Los Angeles Times Calendarlive June 15.
- 2007 Critic Picks, Annie Buckley, Artforum.com, June.
- 2007 Artist Jimmy Baker Plays Around With Armageddon, Justin Hampton, Los Angeles Times, Calendarlive, June 6.
- 2007 A Conversation With Jimmy Baker, Alex Couri, Artslant.com, June
- 2007 Italian Vanity Fair, Lifestyle, April 5 pg.54.
- 2007 Davis, Ben. “LA LA LAND.” Artnet.com, February 28.
- 2007 Because We Can: ePolitics and Excess, essay and images, K48 magazine, NY
- 2007 "The NADA Emerging Artist Page." The L Magazine, 17–30 January: 64.
- 2006 Jimmy Baker, review by Annette Monier, Art In The Age.com, December 22.
- 2006 The Art Explosion, Suzanne Muchnic, Los Angeles Times, October 1, 2006, Los Angeles, CA.
- 2006 The Aftermath of an Idea, review of Challenges, Laura Leffler James, City Beat, April 19, 2006, Cincinnati, OH.
- 2005 Bad At Sports Podcasts, Review of 5 Solo Shows at Western Exhibitions, Chicago, October.
- 2005 FlavorPill, Chicago, Review of 5 Solo Shows at Western Exhibitions, Chicago, October.
- 2005 Brothers Grimmer by Steve Ramos, City Beat, August 24 p. 7, OH.
