= John E. Sparks =

American judge (born 1953)

John Sparks
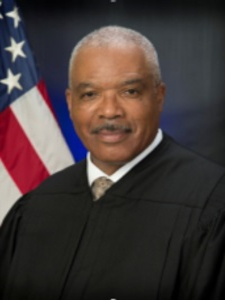

Judge of the United States Court of Appeals for the Armed Forces
- Incumbent
- Assumed office April 19, 2016
- Appointed by: Barack Obama
- Preceded by: James E. Baker

Personal details
- Born: John Edward Sparks Jr. August 15, 1953 (age 72) La Rochelle, France
- Education: United States Naval Academy (BS); University of Connecticut, Hartford (JD)

Military service
- Branch/service: United States Navy; United States Marine Corps
- Years of service: 1972–1998
- Rank: Lieutenant Colonel
- Awards: Defense Superior Service Medal; Meritorious Service Medal (2)

John Edward Sparks (born August 15, 1953) is an American lawyer who serves as a judge of the United States Court of Appeals for the Armed Forces and former commissioner to the chief judge of the same court.

== Biography ==
Sparks was born in La Rochelle, France, was raised in Mount Holly, New Jersey and enlisted in the U.S. Navy in July 1971. After completing Naval Academy Preparatory School he received an appointment to the United States Naval Academy and began the course of instruction as a midshipman in July 1972. He received a Bachelor of Science degree from the United States Naval Academy and upon graduation he accepted a commission as a second lieutenant in the United States Marine Corps. From 1976 to 1986, he served in various positions as an infantry officer in the United States Marine Corps. In 1983, he was accepted into the Marine Corps Excess Leave Law Program and began the study of law at the University of Connecticut School of Law, where he later received a Juris Doctor. He was admitted to the Connecticut Bar in 1986 and was certified as a Marine Corps judge advocate. From 1986 to 1991, he served as a military defense counsel, military prosecutor and Chief Legal Assistance Officer. From 1991 to 1994, he served as a Military Judge at Camp Lejeune, North Carolina. From 1994 to 1996, he served as Military Assistant to the General Counsel at the United States Department of the Navy. From 1996 to 1998, he was Deputy Legal Advisor for the National Security Council, retiring from the Marine Corps at the end of this service in 1998. From 1998 to 1999, he served as Special Assistant to the Secretary of Agriculture in which role he was instrumental in the settlement of a class action lawsuit against the department by African American farmers. He served as Principal Deputy General Counsel of the Navy from 1999 to 2000. From 2000 to 2016, he served as Commissioner to the Chief Judge of the United States Court of Appeals for the Armed Forces.

== Court of Appeals service ==
On July 30, 2015, President Obama nominated Sparks to serve as a judge of the United States Court of Appeals for the Armed Forces, to the seat vacated by Judge James E. Baker, who took senior status on July 31, 2015. This is an Article I Judicial appointment with a term of fifteen years. On December 9, 2015, he received a hearing before the Senate Armed Services Committee. His nomination was reported out of committee on December 15, 2015. The Senate confirmed his nomination on April 5, 2016, by voice vote. He received his commission on April 19, 2016, and took the judicial oath the same day. By law, his commission will expire on July 31, 2031, at which time his term will end, unless he is reappointed.

== Personal ==
Sparks and his wife live in Virginia. They have three adult children.

Legal offices
Preceded by James E. Baker	Judge of the United States Court of Appeals for the Armed Forces; 2016–present	Incumbent
