= David Van Slyke =

American academic (born 1968)

- Van Slyke in 2026

Dean of Maxwell School of Citizenship and Public Affairs
- Incumbent
- Assumed office July 2016
- Preceded by: James Steinberg

Personal details
- Born: 1968 (age 57–58) Beacon, New York
- Education: Rockefeller College of Public Affairs and Policy

David Michael Van Slyke (born 1968) is an American academic and the Dean of the Maxwell School of Citizenship and Public Affairs at Syracuse University. He is the professor of government and policy affairs and Louis A. Bantle Chair in Business-Government Policy. He previously taught at the Andrew Young School of Policy Studies at Georgia State University.

== Early life and education ==
Born in Beacon, New York, Van Slyke first received his undergraduate degree in 1990. For the next 10 years, he worked in both New York state government, private, and nonprofit organizations. He received a master's degree and a PhD in Public Administration and Policy from the Rockefeller College of Public Affairs and Policy at University at Albany, SUNY in 2000.

== Career ==
=== Georgia State University ===
Van Slyke taught on the faculty at Andrew Young School of Policy Studies in Atlanta from 1999–2004 as an assistant professor, where he was the Director of the Nonprofit Studies Program. Van Slyke's research and teaching focused on nonprofit organizations, philanthropy, Public-Private Partnership, and Contracting. In addition, he worked as a consultant with a variety of community organizations, including the Community Foundation of Greater Atlanta and United Way Worldwide.

=== Syracuse University ===
Since 2004, Van Slyke has been a faculty member in the Public Administration and International Relations department at the Maxwell School of Citizenship and Public Affairs at Syracuse University. He is a Senior Research Associate at the Autonomous Systems Policy Institute and the Campbell Public Affairs Institute.

He is known for his research on Public Administration, public Contracting, strategic contracting, and Nonprofit Organization, public-private partnerships, policy implementation, and public administration.

In 2016, Van Slyke was appointed the 10th Dean of the Maxwell School, succeeding James Steinberg. He leads the school of more than 3,000 undergraduate and graduate students in all the social sciences.

In 2020, Van Slyke was appointed to the Defense Business Board by the United States Secretary of Defense Mark Esper.

In addition to his scholarship, Van Slyke has traveled globally, working with foreign governments, nonprofit, and business organizations on performance measurement, strategic planning, and executive education. His travels have taken him to five continents. From 2008–2016 Van Slyke served on the faculty of UNU-MERIT as a Non-Resident Visiting Faculty Member. In addition, he has worked with senior government and military officials in the Government Accountability Office, the Office of Management and Budget, the United States Coast Guard, and the World Bank, among many others. He is currently Director and Fellow of the National Academy of Public Administration (United States) and a co-editor of the "Journal of Public Administration Research and Theory" and the "Journal of Strategic Contracting and Negotiation." Van Slyke has also written op-eds and has been featured by media outlets like NPR, The Washington Post, Politico, and The Atlanta Journal-Constitution.

=== Honors ===
- 2016: High Table Keynote Speaker, Center for Public Administration and Policy, Virginia Tech
- 2015: Distinguished Alumnus in Public Administration and Policy, Rockefeller College of Public Affairs and Policy
- 2015–2021: Board of Directors, National Academy of Public Administration (United States)
- 2014–2018 and 2006–2010: Birkhead-Burkhead Professorship of Teaching Excellence, Maxwell School of Citizenship and Public Affairs

== Books ==
- Complex Contracting: Government Purchasing in the Wake of the U.S. Coast Guard's Deepwater Program, Trevor Brown, Matthew Potoski, and David M. Van Slyke, Cambridge University Press (2013), ISBN 1107038626 [**Best Book Award from the American Society for Public Administration (2014) and an Honorable Mention from the Public and Nonprofit Section of the Academy of Management best book award (2016)]
- The Future of Public Administration Around the World: The Minnowbrook Perspective, ed. Rosemary O'Leary, Soonhee Kim, and David M. Van Slyke, Georgetown University Press (2010), ISBN 1589017110
