= Nicolson–Ross–Weir method =

Measurement technique in microwave engineering

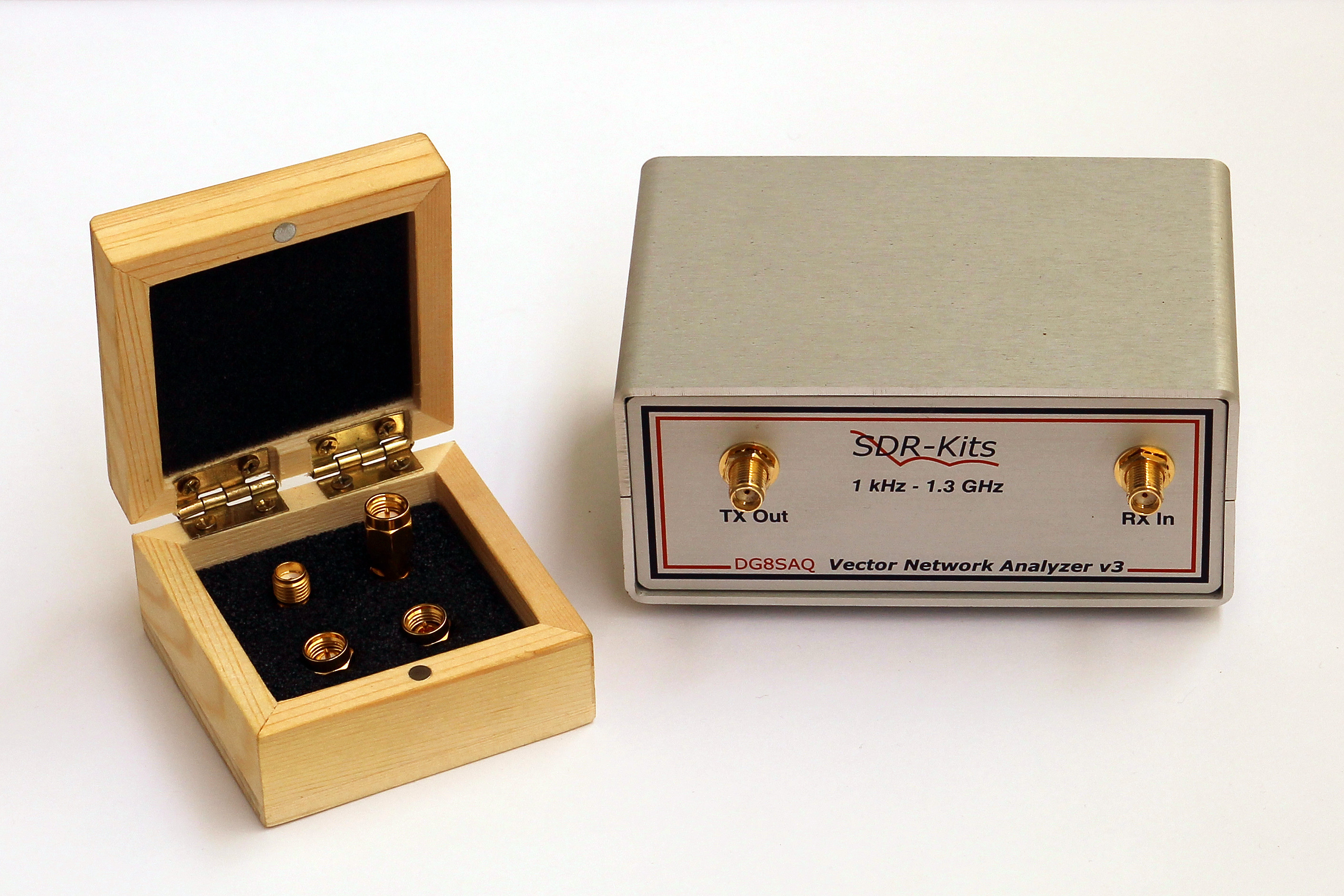
A vector network analyzer, which can be used to extract scattering parameters for Nicolson–Ross–Weir calculations

Nicolson–Ross–Weir method is a measurement technique for determination of complex permittivities and permeabilities of material samples for microwave frequencies. The method is based on insertion of a material sample with a known thickness inside a waveguide, such as a coaxial cable or a rectangular waveguide, after which the dispersion data is extracted from the resulting scattering parameters. The method is named after A. M. Nicolson and G. F. Ross, and W. B. Weir, who developed the approach in 1970 and 1974, respectively.

The technique is one of the most common procedures for material characterization in microwave engineering.

== Method ==
The method uses scattering parameters of a material sample embedded in a waveguide, namely $S_{11}$ and $S_{21}$, to calculate permittivity and permeability data. $S_{11}$ and $S_{21}$ correspond to the cumulative reflection and transmission coefficient of the sample that are referenced to the each sample end, respectively: these parameters account for the multiple internal reflections inside the sample, which is considered to have a thickness of $d$. The reflection coefficient of the bulk sample is:

$$\Gamma=X \pm \sqrt{X^2-1}$$

where

$$X=\frac{1-(S_{21}^2-S_{11}^2)}{2 S_{11}}$$

The sign of the root for the reflection coefficient is chosen appropriately to ensure its passivity ($|\Gamma| \leq 1$). Similarly, the transmission coefficient of the bulk sample can be written as:

$$T=\frac{S_{11}+S_{21}-\Gamma}{1-(S_{11}+S_{21})\Gamma}$$

Thus, the effective permeability ($\mu^*$) and permittivity ($\varepsilon^*$) of the material can be written as:

$$\mu^*=\frac{\lambda_{0g}}{\Lambda} \left( \frac{1+\Gamma}{1-\Gamma} \right)$$

$$\varepsilon^*=\frac{\lambda^2_0 \left( \frac{1}{\Lambda^2}+\frac{1}{\lambda_c^2} \right)}{\mu^*}$$

where

$$\frac{1}{\Lambda^2}=-\left[ \frac{1}{2\pi d} ln\frac{1}{T} \right]^2$$

and

- $\lambda_0$ is the free-space wavelength.
- $\lambda_{0g}$ is the guided mode wavelength of the unfilled transmission line.
- $\lambda_{c}$ is the cutoff wavelength of the unfilled transmission line

The constitutive relation for $\Lambda$ admits an infinite number of solutions due to the branches of the complex logarithm. The ambiguity regarding its result can be resolved by taking the group delay into account.

== Limitations and extensions ==
In the case of low material loss, the Nicolson–Ross–Weir method is known to be unstable for sample thicknesses at integer multiples of one half wavelength due to resonance phenomenon. Improvements over the standard algorithm have been presented in engineering literature to alleviate this effect. Furthermore, complete filling of a waveguide with sample material may pose a particular challenge: presence of gaps during the filling of the waveguide section would excite higher-order modes, which may yield errors in scattering parameter results. In such cases, more advanced methods based on the rigorous modal analysis of partially-filled waveguides or optimization methods can be used. A modification of the method for single-port measurements was also reported.

In addition to homogenous materials, the extension of the method was developed to obtain constitutive parameters of isotropic and bianisotropic metamaterials.

== See also ==
- Fourier-transform spectroscopy
- Microwave radiometer
- Reflection seismology
- Spectroscopy
- Time-domain reflectometer
- Vector network analyzer
