= Syracuse University College of Law =

Law school in Syracuse, New York, US

Coordinates: 43°2′10.6″N 76°8′19.5″W

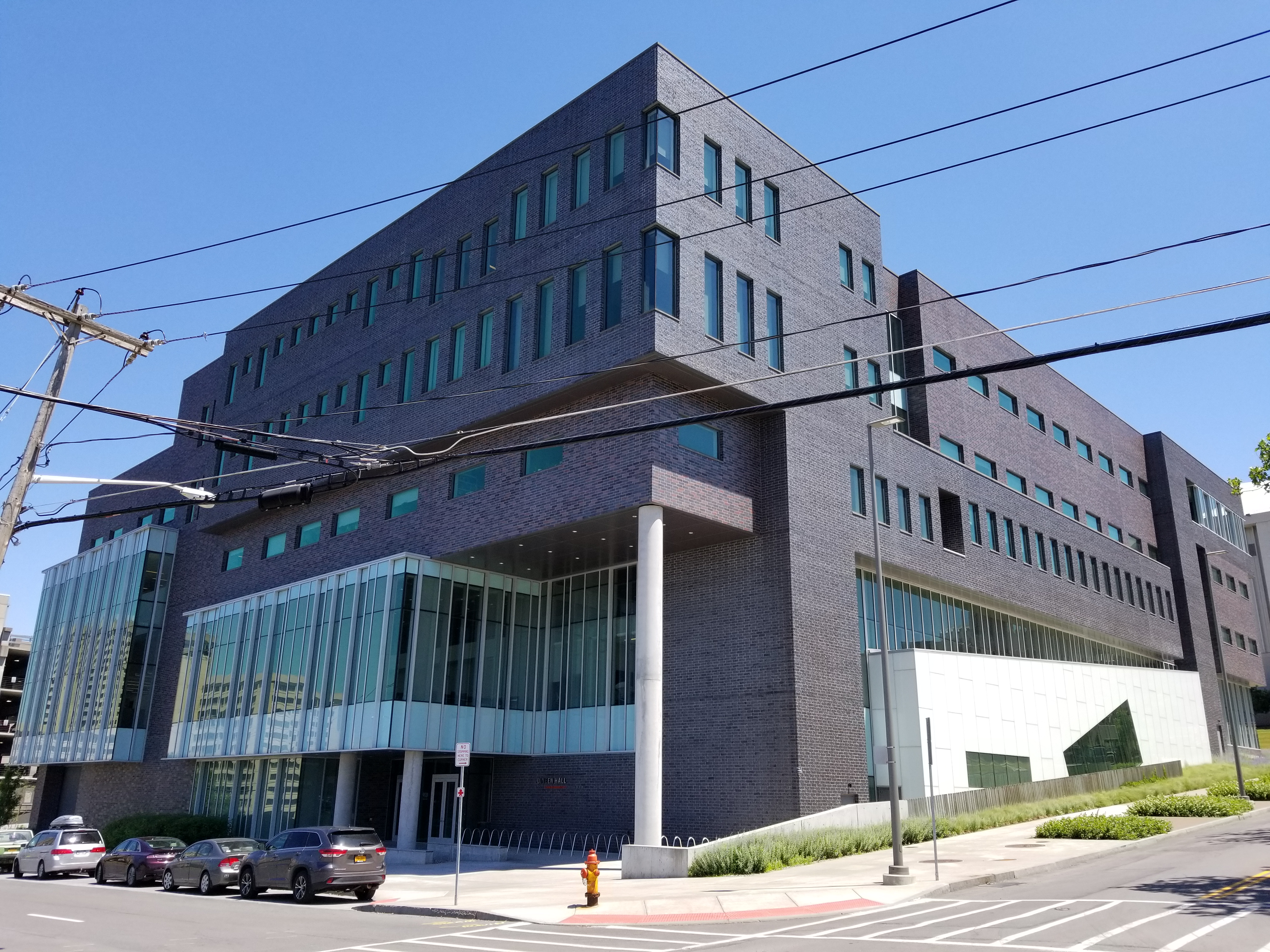
- Dineen Hall in 2015
- Parent school: Syracuse University
- Religious affiliation: None
- Established: 1895; 131 years ago
- School type: Private
- Parent endowment: $1.8 billion (2021)
- Dean: Terence J. Lau
- Location: Syracuse, New York, U.S.
- Enrollment: 750 J.D. and 16 LL.M. (2025)
- Faculty: 59 full-time, 39 part-time
- USNWR ranking: 100th (tie) (2026)
- Bar pass rate: 84.77%
- Website: law.syracuse.edu
- ABA profile: Standard 509 Report

The Syracuse University College of Law is the law school of Syracuse University in Syracuse, New York. It is one of four law schools in upstate New York. Syracuse was accredited by the American Bar Association in 1923 and is a charter member of the Association of American Law Schools.

Syracuse's College of Law is a leader in the emerging field of National Security law through the Institute for Security Policy and Law. The College of Law is home to the New York State Science & Technology Law Center. It maintains a chapter of the Order of the Coif law honor society, of which only 86 of the more than 204 ABA-accredited law schools are a member. In February 2018, the College of Law announced its formation of the first "real-time, ABA-approved online juris doctor program in the United States." The online J.D. program, titled JDinteractive was launched in 2019.

== History ==
The school began operating in September 1895. William Henry Hornblower, a Presbyterian minister, gave the opening address at the initiatory session of the new Syracuse Law school. It was admitted to the Phi Delta Phi legal fraternity in 1898. Classes were held in various downtown area facilities until a move to the E.I. White Hall on the SU campus in 1954.

In 1903, William Herbert Johnson became the first African American graduate of the law school, but was barred by the New York State Bar from the profession because of his race. He was posthumously admitted to the New York State Bar in October 2019.

== Academics ==
=== Degree programs ===
The College of Law offers a Juris Doctor (J.D.), and a Master of Laws (LL.M.). Programs are offered as residential as well as online.

The college offers 11 joint degree programs with, among others, Syracuse University's Maxwell School of Citizenship and Public Affairs, Newhouse School of Public Communications, Whitman School of Management and others. Syracuse Law also offers a joint J.D./LL.M. in Advocacy and Litigation, allowing full-time, on-campus J.D. students to earn both their J.D. and LL.M. in just three years without any additional cost beyond that of the J.D. It also offers externships in, among other locations, New York City, Washington, D.C., and London.

=== Advocacy skills training ===
The College of Law was honored with the Emil Gumpert Award for the best law school advocacy program in the United States by the American College of Trial Lawyers. The college has won the Tiffany Cup, an award given by the New York State Bar Association to law schools that finished with the best National Trial Competition (NTC) record, 18 times as of 2014.

Syracuse has received the highest award that the American College of Trial Lawyers gives to law schools based on the school's trial advocacy record and the strength of the school's trial training programs. In 2022 U.S. News & World Report ranked the College of Law's trial advocacy program 11th in the United States.

The college of Law has operated the Criminal Defense Clinic since 1971. The clinic helps law students gain practical courtroom experience representing low-income individuals pro-bono throughout Onondaga County, working typically on civil matters such as shoplifting, vandalism and traffic violations.

== Rankings ==
The College of Law is tied for 100th in the 2025–2026 U.S. News & World Report Best Law Schools rankings.

== Buildings and facilities ==
=== Dineen Hall ===
The College of Law is located in Dineen Hall on the West Campus expansion area of Syracuse University. On November 5, 2010, the university and the College of Law announced and dedicated the construction of a new law school complex, named Dineen Hall. SU Architecture alumnus Richard Gluckman, of the Gluckman Mayner Architects in New York City, was the lead architect. The complex, located at 950 Irving Avenue, is approximately 200,000 square feet (19,000 m^{2}) and is named for the Dineen family, who provided the $15 million naming gift in a fundraising campaign for the $90 million building.

=== Library ===
Its library is a congressionally designated depository for Federal materials and houses a collection of Supreme Court Justice Robert H. Jackson's artifacts and documents.

== Research centers ==
- Burton Blatt Institute
- Disability Law and Policy Program (DLPP)
- Innovation Law Center (ILC)
- Institute for Security Policy and Law
- Institute for the Study of the Judiciary, Politics, and the Media (IJPM)
- Property, Citizenship, and Social Entrepreneurism (PCSE)
- Syracuse Intellectual Property Law Institute (SIPLI)

== Employment ==
According to Syracuse University College of Law's 2021 ABA-required disclosures, 124 of the 165 members of the Class of 2021 obtained full-time, long-term, JD-required employment nine months after graduation, with the top three locations of employment being New York, Washington, D.C., and New Jersey. Syracuse University College of Law's Law School Transparency under-employment score for the class of 2021 is 17.6%.

== Cost of Attendance ==
Tuition for the on-campus J.D. program is $62,220 for the 2024–25 academic year. The estimated annual cost of attendance, including tuition, fees, and living expenses, is $88,090.

== Publications ==
- The Journal of Global Rights and Organizations/Impunity Watch (online journal), est. 2007
- Syracuse Journal of International Law and Commerce, est. 1972
- Syracuse Journal of Science & Technology Law (JOST; formerly Syracuse Science & Technology Law Reporter and Syracuse Law and Technology Journal)
- Syracuse Law Review, est. 1949

== Notable alumni ==
The College of Law has over 11,000 law alumni in all 50 states and 39 foreign countries.

== Notable professors ==
- James E. Baker, Professor of Law, former Chief Judge to the United States Court of Appeals for the Armed Forces
- Craig M. Boise, Dean emeritus
- David Cay Johnston, Distinguished Visiting Lecturer, journalist and Pulitzer Prize for Beat Reporting winner

== See also ==
- Syracuse University
- Burton Blatt Institute
- Institute for Security Policy and Law
- Law of New York
