= Maxwell School of Citizenship and Public Affairs =

Public policy school of Syracuse University

Coordinates: 43.038038°N 76.13571°W

- Established: 1924; 102 years ago
- Parent institution: Syracuse University
- Accreditation: APSIA, NASPAA
- Academic affiliations: TPC
- Dean: David Van Slyke
- Academic staff: 200
- Students: 3,000
- Location: Syracuse, New York, United States
- Website: maxwell.syr.edu

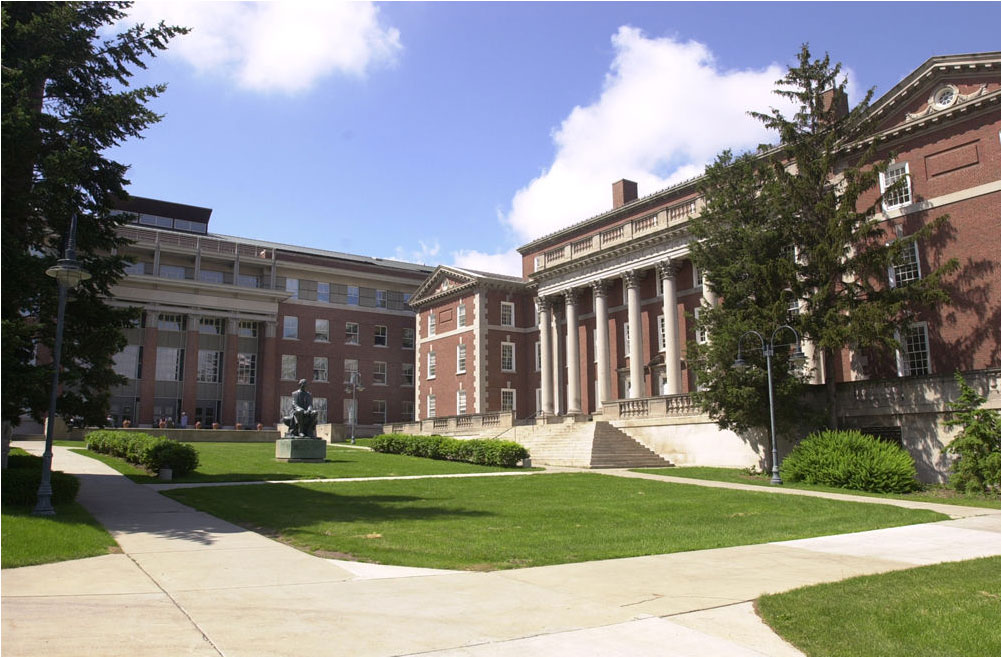
The outside of the Maxwell School of Citizenship and Public Affairs in 2008.

The Maxwell School of Citizenship and Public Affairs (Maxwell School) is the professional public policy school of Syracuse University, a private research university in Syracuse, New York. The school is organized in 12 academic departments and 14 affiliated research centers and offers coursework in the fields of public administration, international relations, foreign policy, political science, science and technology policy, social sciences, and economics through its undergraduate (BA) degrees, graduate Master of Public Affairs (MPA), Master of Arts (MA), and PhD degrees.

== History ==
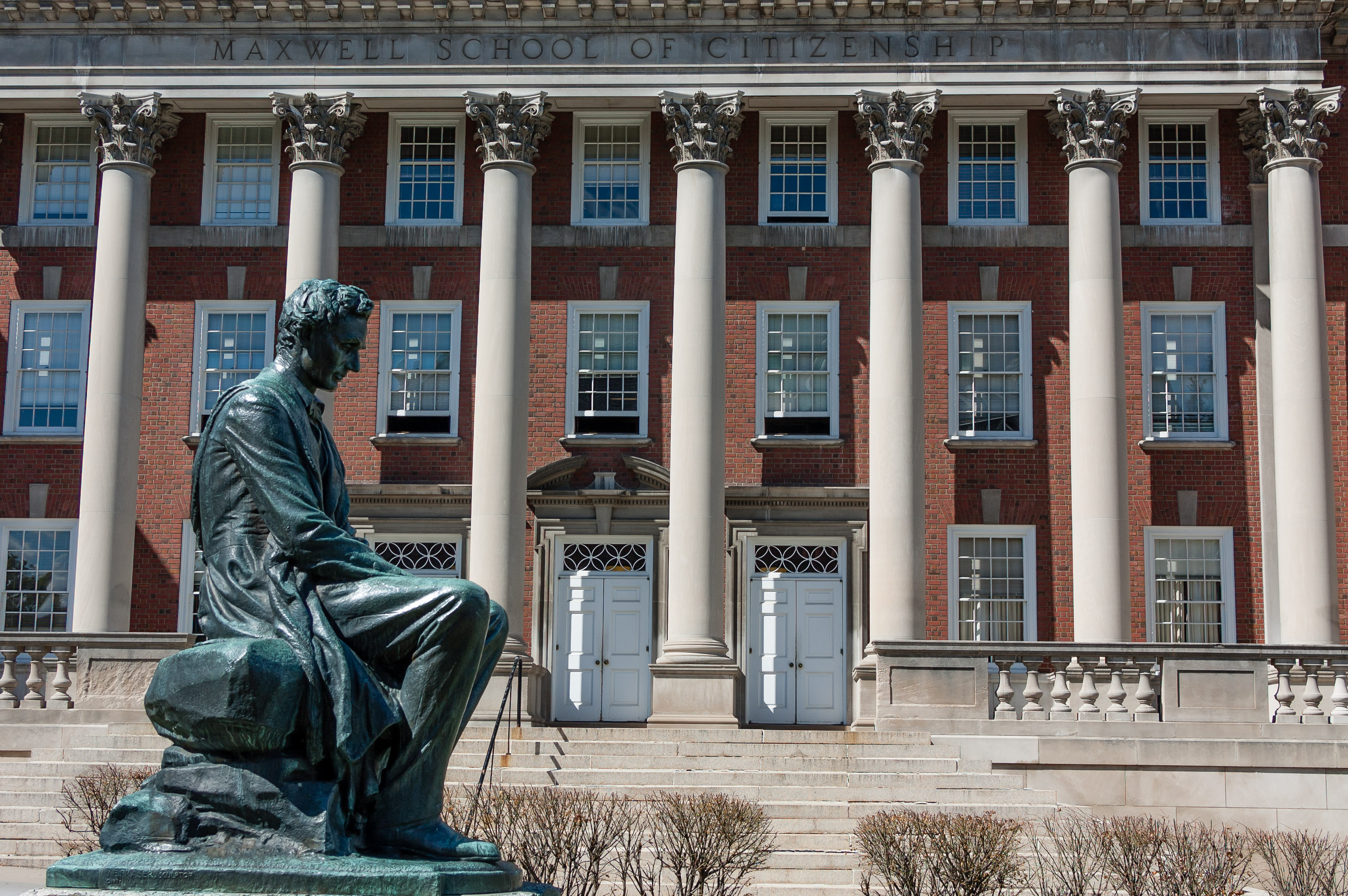
Abraham Lincoln Statue by sculptor James Earle Fraser, sitting in front of the Maxwell School.

The precursor to the Maxwell School was the Training School for Public Service, founded by New York City’s Bureau of Municipal Research, which was transferred to Syracuse University in 1924. The school was initially a vehicle for municipal reform, its students serving as a pool of researchers tasked with uncovering examples of the corruption of Tammany Hall.

The school gained its name after George Holmes Maxwell, a Boston-based patent attorney and Syracuse alumnus. In 1924, Maxwell donated $500,000 to the university to establish a school which would aim "to cull from every source those principles, facts, and elements which, combined, make up our rights and duties and our value and distinctiveness as United States citizens." Maxwell's initial interest was in training all undergraduates for their roles as informed citizens in the American democracy; University officials convinced him the school should also provide professional training for future government officials and other public servants.

The Maxwell School was dedicated on October 3, 1924, and was the first program to offer a graduate professional degree in public administration. That Master of Public Administration program is the oldest continuously operating, university-based MPA in the United States.

In 1937, the school took its full name and moved into Maxwell Hall, a purpose-built building on the west end of Syracuse University's main campus. The hall was dedicated by president Herbert Hoover on November 12, 1937. In that year, Syracuse University's graduate programs and undergraduate instruction in the social sciences were moved into Maxwell, giving the school the unusual hybrid structure that remains today.

In 1968, Maxwell professor Dwight Waldo presided over the Minnowbrook I conference, which established the foundations for New Public Administration. Subsequent Minnowbrook II and III conferences were held in 1988 and 2008 at the eponymous Blue Mountain Lake retreat.

The school's rapid growth necessitated the 1990 "Campaign for Maxwell", which raised capital to fund a new building to accommodate the expansion. The Holden Observatory, built in 1887, was moved to create space for a new 5-story building. The result of the campaign was the Bohlin Cywinski Jackson-designed Eggers Hall, which opened in 1994. Eggers Hall adjoins Maxwell Hall at the corner, together forming an L-shaped complex that houses the present-day Maxwell School.

In 2013, the Maxwell School and the Center for Strategic and International Studies entered into a collaborative agreement that included headquartering all Maxwell operations at CSIS.

== Academics ==
=== Departments ===
- Anthropology
- Economics
- Executive Education
- Geography
- History
- International Relations
- Policy Studies
- Political Science
- Social Science
- Sociology

=== Research centers ===
The school hosts or co-hosts 15 research centers or institutes, encouraging interdisciplinary study and conversation within such broad rubrics as global affairs, domestic policy, conflict and collaboration, environmental studies, aging, public wellness, citizenship, and national security and counterterrorism.

- Autonomous Systems Policy Institute
- Campbell Public Affairs Institute
- Center for Aging and Policy Studies (CAPS)
- Center for Environmental Policy and Administration
- Center for Policy Research: The CPR, established in 1994, houses the Metropolitan Studies, Aging Studies programs, the Lerner Center for Public Health Promotion, and the Upstate Health Research Network.
- Center for Qualitative and Multi-Method Inquiry
- Institute for the Study of the Judiciary, Politics, and the Media: Co-sponsored with Syracuse Law and the S.I. Newhouse School of Public Communications.
- Maxwell X Lab: Started in 2017, the "X Lab" bridges the gap between university research and the public and non-profit sectors. The research leverages behavioral science and randomized controlled trials to build evidence for what works. Syracuse University alumnus Joseph Boskovski started the Maxwell X Lab with Professor Leonard Lopoo, then-director of the Center for Policy Research at Maxwell, in January 2017, according to an article by writer Edy Semaan on the school's official news website. The Maxwell X Lab has worked with the Lerner Center for Public Health Promotion, the City of Syracuse, the Early Childhood Alliance, and others, covering areas like healthcare and education.
- Moynihan Institute of Global Affairs: Established 2005 and named for Daniel Patrick Moynihan, studies challenges to the quality of governance worldwide.
- Institute for Security Policy and Law, formerly known as the Institute for National Security and Counterterrorism

=== Joint and concurrent degrees ===
- Master of Public Health, with SUNY Upstate Medical
- Public Diplomacy, with the Newhouse School
- Documentary Film and History, with the Newhouse School
- Masters in Public Administration with School of Advanced International Studies (SAIS) at Johns Hopkins University

Maxwell maintains formal relationships with a number of American and global institutions, among them the Chinese Academy of Governance, East China Normal University, Fudan University, the Hertie School of Governance, the Indian Institute of Management, Bangalore, the Korea Development Institute, the Korea Institute of Public Administration, Moscow State University, Seoul National University, and Tsinghua University.

=== Online programs ===
==== Online Executive Master of Public Administration Program ====
The Maxwell School offers an online Executive Master of Public Administration degree for mid-career professionals. The curriculum requires 30 credits, includes live online classes and real-world learning opportunities, and can be completed in 15 months. Courses focus on mastery in leading and managing organizations with diverse stakeholders; formulating, implementing, and evaluating policy; and applying rigorous and evidence-based analysis to inform decision-making.

== Rankings ==
Since 1995, the Maxwell School has been ranked the top graduate program for public affairs in the country in 12 out of the 13 times the rankings were administered by U.S. News & World Report. In 2022, the school ranked #1 in Public Management and Leadership, #2 in Nonprofit Management and Public Finance and Budgeting, #6 in the Environmental Policy and Management department, and six other sub-speciality ranked in the top 15.

In 2018, Foreign Policy magazine ranked the master's program in International Relations #16 in the world.

== Notable alumni ==
=== Government and politics ===
- John R. Bass, US Ambassador to Georgia, Turkey, and Afghanistan (BA '86)
- John Berry, US Ambassador to Australia (MPA '81)
- David Bing, Mayor, City of Detroit (MS '06 & JD '06)
- Carolyn Bourdeaux, member, US House of Representatives (DPA '03)
- Andrew R. Ciesla, Senator, State of New Jersey (MPA '76)
- James B. Cunningham, Ambassador for Kabul, Afghanistan (BA '74)
- Benjamin Diokno, Professor Emeritus at the University of the Philippines Diliman School of Economics and Department of Budget and Management secretary of the Philippines, 1998–2001 and 2016–present (PhD '81)
- Kwabena Duffuor, Finance Minister of Ghana (MA '75)
- Robert Duffy, New York Lieutenant Governor (MPA '98)
- James E. Graves Jr., Federal Judge, United States Court of Appeals for the Fifth Circuit (MPA '81)
- Stanley L. Greigg, former member of the U.S. House of Representatives from northwestern Iowa (MPA '56)
- Ponatshego Kedikilwe, Vice President, Republic of Botswana (MPA '72)
- Stephanie Miner, Mayor, Syracuse, NY (BA '92)
- Mohammad Al Murr, Speaker, UAE Federal National Council (BA '78)
- Bismark Myrick, former Ambassador to Liberia (MA '73)
- Masahide Ota, Governor, Okinawa Prefecture (MA '56)
- Matt Rhoades, American political consultant and strategist for the Republican National Committee (MPA '00)
- Steve Rothman, member, US House of Representatives (BA '74)
- Nily Rozic (born 1986), Israeli-born American member of the New York State Assembly
- Salvador del Solar, former Prime Minister of Peru (MA '02)
- Donna Shalala, Member of the US House of Representatives and former Secretary of Health and Human Services (MPA '70 & PhD '70)
- Arun Shourie, Indian politician and civil servant (PhD '66 & MA '65)
- Lt. General Jay B. Silveria, twentieth Superintendent of the U.S. Air Force Academy. (MSS '97)
- Christine Varney, former Antitrust Officer Department of Justice (MPA '78)
- John P. White, Former Deputy Secretary, U.S. Department of Defense (PhD '69 & MPA '64)
- Al Waleed bin Talal Al Saud, Chairman and CEO of Kingdom Holding Company

=== Non-profit ===
- Molly Corbett Broad, President, American Council on Education (BA '62)
- Marc S. Ellenbogen, President, Prague Society for International Cooperation & Chairman, Global Panel Foundation (MIR '85)
- Mark Emmert, President, NCAA (former President, University of Washington) (MPA '76, PhD '83)

=== Academia ===
- Walter Broadnax, former President, Clark Atlanta University (PhD '75)
- Kent John Chabotar, President, Guilford College (MPA '69 & PhD '73)
- Michael Crow, President, Arizona State University (PhD '85)
- A. Lee Fritschler, President, Dickinson College (MPA'60 & PhD '65)
- Alice Stone Ilchman, President, Sarah Lawrence College (MPA'58)
- William M. LeoGrande, former Dean, American University School of International Service (BA '71 & MA '73)
- Sean O'Keefe, University Professor at the Maxwell School; former CEO, Airbus Group, Inc. (former Administrator of NASA and former Chancellor, Louisiana State University) (MPA '79)
- Joseph Rallo, former President, Angelo State University and Vice Chancellor, Texas Tech University (MA '78 & PhD '80)
- James F. Rinehart, Dean, Troy University, College of Arts and Sciences (MS '91 & PhD '93)
- Kenneth P. Ruscio, President, Washington and Lee University (MPA '78 & PhD '83)
- Mitchel B. Wallerstein, President, Baruch College (formerly 8th Dean of the Maxwell School of Citizenship and Public Affairs) (MPA '72)

=== Private sector ===
- Al-Waleed bin Talal, founder and CEO of Kingdom Holding Company, member of the Saudi Royal Family (MSSc '85)
- Douglas Davis, music industry executive and producer, entertainment lawyer, four-time Grammy Award winner

== Notable faculty ==
- James E. Baker – former Chief Judge of the United States Court of Appeals for the Armed Forces
- William C. Banks – legal scholar in national security law
- Catherine Bertini – former Executive Director of the United Nations World Food Program
- Leonard Burman – economist and former Deputy Assistant Secretary of the Treasury for Tax Analysis
- James B. Cunningham – former Ambassador to Afghanistan & Israel
- Robert Daly – director of the Kissinger Institute on China and the United States
- David McKean – former Ambassador to Luxembourg and 27th Director of Policy Planning
- Sean O'Keefe – former Administrator of NASA and Secretary of the Navy
- Alex Wagner – former Assistant Secretary of the Air Force (Manpower & Reserve Affairs)
