= Robert E. Wiss =

American judge (1929–1995)

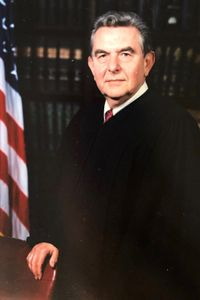

Judge of the United States Court of Appeals for the Armed Forces
- In office January 2, 1992 – October 23, 1995
- Preceded by: New seat
- Succeeded by: Andrew S. Effron

Personal details
- Born: February 20, 1929 Chicago, Illinois
- Died: October 23, 1995 (aged 66) Washington, D.C.
- Education: University of Illinois (BA); Northwestern University (JD)

Military service
- Allegiance: United States
- Branch/service: United States Navy
- Years of service: 1950–1988
- Rank: Rear Admiral
- Commands: Director, Naval Reserve Law Program
- Battles/wars: Korean War
- Awards: Legion of Merit

Robert Edward Wiss (February 20, 1929 – October 23, 1995) was a lawyer who served as a judge of the United States Court of Appeals for the Armed Forces from 1992 until his death in 1995. He retired from the United States Naval Reserve Judge Advocate General's Corps as a rear admiral in 1988.

== Early life and education ==
Born and raised in Chicago, Wiss graduated from the Wells High School in 1946. He attended the University of Illinois and earned a B.A. degree in 1950. Commissioned as an ensign through the NROTC program, Wiss served in the United States Navy during the Korean War and then transitioned to the Naval Reserve in 1953. Returning to school, he completed his J.D. degree at the Northwestern University School of Law in 1956.

== Career ==
As a Navy ensign, Wiss served aboard the carriers USS Boxer and USS Sicily. He later held staff positions in Tokyo and at the United Nations Peace Conference in Kaesong.

In 1959, Wiss joined Thomas A. Foran's law firm. He later became a senior partner in Foran, Wiss & Schultz. Wiss served as legal counsel for seven cases before the United States Court of Appeals for the Seventh Circuit and six cases before the United States Supreme Court, one of which was Elrod v. Burns.

At various points during his legal career, Wiss served as special assistant attorney general for the state of Illinois, special assistant corporation counsel for the city of Chicago, special assistant states attorney for Cook County, Illinois and general counsel for the public administrator of Cook County.

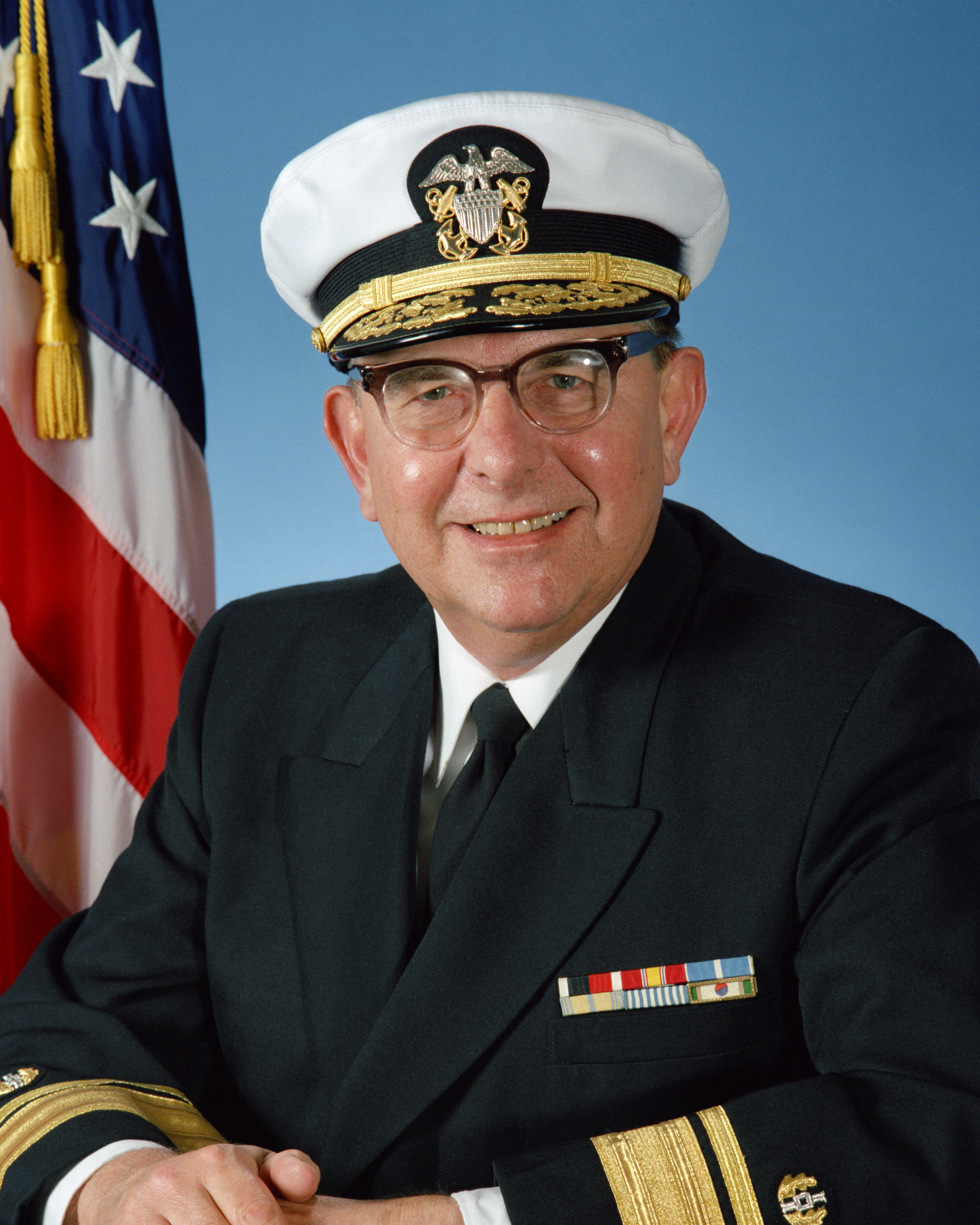
Rear Adm. Wiss in 1988

Wiss continued to serve as a lawyer in the Naval Reserve and was advanced to commodore in 1983 and rear admiral in 1986. From 1984 to 1988, he served as director of the Naval Reserve Law Program.

On October 2, 1991, President George H. W. Bush nominated Wiss and Herman F. Gierke to two new seats on the United States Court of Military Appeals. They appeared before the Senate Committee on Armed Services on November 12, 1991, and were confirmed by unanimous consent of the full Senate two days later.

On January 2, 1992, Wiss joined the Court of Military Appeals (later renamed the Court of Appeals for the Armed Forces). While still serving as a judge, he died at Sibley Memorial Hospital in 1995.

== Personal ==
Wiss was married to Charlene J. Sternaman (July 14, 1930 – January 22, 2017). They had three daughters and nine grandchildren.

Wiss and his wife are interred at Arlington National Cemetery.
