= Kevin A. Ohlson =

American judge (born 1960)

Kevin Ohlson
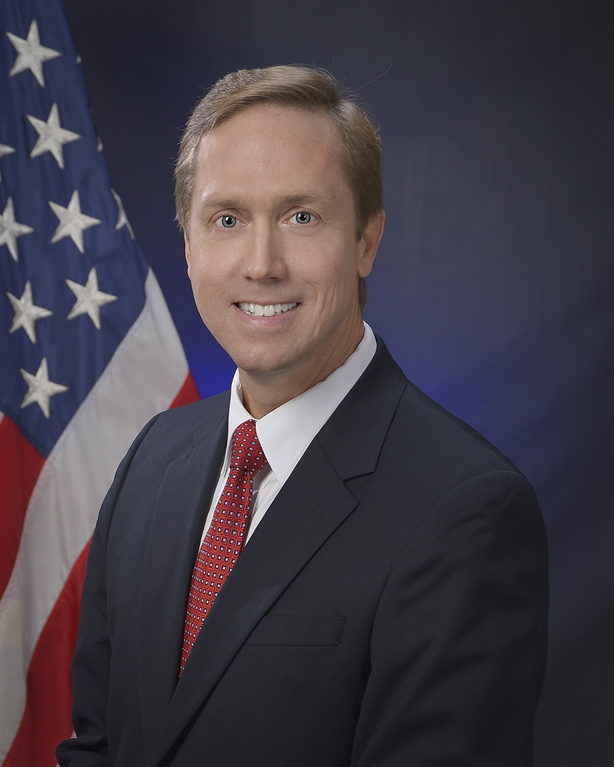
- Official portrait, 2013

Chief Judge of the United States Court of Appeals for the Armed Forces
- In office August 1, 2021 – August 1, 2026
- Preceded by: Scott W. Stucky
- Succeeded by: Gregory E. Maggs

Judge of the United States Court of Appeals for the Armed Forces
- Incumbent
- Assumed office November 1, 2013
- Appointed by: Barack Obama
- Preceded by: Andrew S. Effron

Personal details
- Born: Kevin Alan Ohlson; March 29, 1960 (age 66) Holden, Massachusetts, U.S.
- Spouse: Carolyn Davis
- Education: Washington and Jefferson College (BA); University of Virginia (JD)

Military service
- Allegiance: United States
- Branch/service: United States Army
- Years of service: 1986–1995
- Unit: XVIII Airborne Corps
- Battles/wars: Gulf War
- Awards: Bronze Star

Kevin Alan Ohlson (born March 29, 1960) is an American lawyer who served as the chief judge of the United States Court of Appeals for the Armed Forces from 2021 to 2026.

== Biography ==
Ohlson was born in Holden, Massachusetts, and raised in Sterling, Massachusetts, graduating from Wachusett Regional High School in 1978. He received a Bachelor of Arts degree in 1982 from Washington and Jefferson College. He received a Juris Doctor in 1985 from the University of Virginia School of Law. He was commissioned as an officer in the United States Army in 1986, serving as a judge advocate and paratrooper. In 1990, he served in the Gulf War, earning a Bronze Star. From 1991 to 1997, he served as an assistant United States Attorney in the District of Columbia. From 1997 to 2001, he served as Chief of Staff to the Deputy Attorney General. From 2001 to 2002, he was a member of the Board of Immigration Appeals. From 2002 to 2007, he served as Deputy Director of the Executive Office for Immigration Review, serving as Director from 2007 to 2009. From 2009 to January 2011, he served as Chief of Staff to United States Attorney General Eric Holder. From 2011 to 2013, he served as Chief of the Professional Misconduct Review Unit in the United States Department of Justice.

== Court of Appeals service ==
On September 15, 2011, President Barack Obama nominated Ohlson to serve as a judge of the United States Court of Appeals for the Armed Forces, to the seat vacated by Judge Andrew S. Effron, who took senior status on September 30, 2011. This is an Article I Judicial appointment with a term of fifteen years. His nomination received a hearing before the Senate Armed Services Committee. His nomination was returned to the President on January 3, 2013, due to the sine die adjournment of the Senate. President Obama renominated him on March 21, 2013. The Senate Armed Services Committee again held a hearing on his nomination on September 19, 2013, and reported his nomination to the floor on September 24, 2013. The Senate confirmed his nomination on October 16, 2013, by unanimous consent. He received his commission on November 1, 2013, and took the judicial oath the same day. By law, his commission will expire on July 31, 2028, at which time his term will end, unless he is reappointed. He became Chief Judge on August 1, 2021.

== Personal ==
Ohlson lives in Virginia with his wife, Dr. Carolyn Davis, and their two children, Matthew and Katherine.

Legal offices
Preceded by Andrew S. Effron	Judge of the United States Court of Appeals for the Armed Forces; 2013–present	Incumbent
Preceded by Scott W. Stucky	Chief Judge of the United States Court of Appeals for the Armed Forces; 2021–present	Incumbent
