= The Trial of the Chicago 7 =

2020 American film by Aaron Sorkin

- Release poster
- Directed by: Aaron Sorkin
- Written by: Aaron Sorkin
- Produced by: Stuart M. Besser; Matt Jackson; Marc Platt; Tyler Thompson
- Starring: Yahya Abdul-Mateen II; Sacha Baron Cohen; Daniel Flaherty; Joseph Gordon-Levitt; Michael Keaton; Frank Langella; John Carroll Lynch; Eddie Redmayne; Noah Robbins; Mark Rylance; Alex Sharp; Jeremy Strong
- Cinematography: Phedon Papamichael
- Edited by: Alan Baumgarten
- Music by: Daniel Pemberton
- Production companies: Paramount Pictures; Cross Creek Pictures; DreamWorks Pictures; Marc Platt Productions; ShivHans Pictures
- Distributed by: Netflix
- Release date: September 25, 2020
- Running time: 130 minutes
- Country: United States
- Language: English
- Budget: $35 million
- Box office: $116,473

The Trial of the Chicago 7 is a 2020 American historical legal drama film written and directed by Aaron Sorkin. The film follows the Chicago Seven, a group of anti–Vietnam War protesters charged with conspiracy and crossing state lines with the intention of inciting riots at the 1968 Democratic National Convention in Chicago. It features an ensemble cast including Yahya Abdul-Mateen II, Sacha Baron Cohen, Daniel Flaherty, Joseph Gordon-Levitt, Michael Keaton, Frank Langella, John Carroll Lynch, Eddie Redmayne, Noah Robbins, Mark Rylance, Alex Sharp, Ben Shenkman, and Jeremy Strong.

Sorkin wrote the screenplay in 2007, with the intent of Steven Spielberg directing the film and cast mostly unknown actors. After the 2007 Writers Guild of America strike and budget concerns forced Spielberg to drop out as director, Sorkin was announced as director in October 2018, and much of the cast joined the same month, with Spielberg instead serving as executive producer. Filming took place in the fall of 2019 in Chicago and around New Jersey.

Originally planned for a theatrical release by Paramount Pictures, the distribution rights to the film were sold to Netflix due to the COVID-19 pandemic. The Trial of the Chicago 7 was released in selected theaters on September 25, 2020, and began streaming digitally on Netflix on October 16. The film received positive reviews from critics, who praised the performances (particularly from Baron Cohen), Sorkin's screenplay, the cinematography, the editing and the modern parallels to the 1960s. The film earned six nominations at the 93rd Academy Awards, including Best Picture and Best Supporting Actor for Baron Cohen. It also received five nominations at the 78th Golden Globe Awards (winning for Best Screenplay), three at the 27th Screen Actors Guild Awards (winning Outstanding Performance by a Cast in a Motion Picture), and three at the 74th British Academy Film Awards.

== Plot ==
In August 1968, Abbie Hoffman, Jerry Rubin, Tom Hayden, Rennie Davis, David Dellinger, Lee Weiner, John Froines, and Bobby Seale make preparations to protest at the Democratic National Convention in Chicago. Five months later, they are arrested and charged with "crossing state lines" to incite a riot. John N. Mitchell, the Attorney General, appoints Tom Foran and Richard Schultz as the prosecutors, while all the defendants except Seale are represented by William Kunstler and Leonard Weinglass.

Judge Julius Hoffman shows significant prejudice for the prosecution, especially insisting that he and Abbie Hoffman are not related. Seale's attorney, Charles Garry, cannot attend due to illness, leading Judge Hoffman to insist that Kunstler represent him. This insistence is rejected by both Kunstler and Seale. Seale receives support from Fred Hampton which Judge Hoffman assumes is legal help. Abbie Hoffman openly antagonizes the court. Judge Hoffman removes two jurors who he suspects sympathize with the defendants due to alleged threats from the Black Panther Party and charges the defendants and their attorneys with multiple counts of contempt of court. Tension builds between the defendants.

Numerous undercover police officers and FBI agents testify. At the time of the convention, Hayden noticed two police officers tailing Davis and attempted to let the air out of their tire, but was caught and later arrested. Abbie and others led a protest to the police station where Hayden was detained but turned around upon seeing the police blockade outside. When trying to return to the park, police had taken control of the hill with orders to disperse the crowd leading to a riot between police and protesters.

Days later, the defendants learn that Fred Hampton was killed during a police raid. In retaliation for Seale continuing to speak up for his constitutional rights, Judge Hoffman has him taken to another room, beaten, and returned gagged and chained. This causes the defense and the prosecution to object, and Judge Hoffman declares Seale's case a mistrial.

The defense puts Ramsey Clark, Attorney General during the riots, on the stand. Judge Hoffman refuses to let him testify in front of the jury as he had declined to initiate prosecutions after the riots because of evidence that the Chicago Police Department instigated them. Dellinger punches a bailiff, resulting in his arrest.

Kunstler presents a tape implicating Hayden to the defendants and preps Hayden for cross-examination. On the night of the riot, Davis tried to pacify officers trying to arrest someone climbing a flagpole. After the police clubbed Davis's head, an enraged Hayden exclaimed, "If blood is going to flow, then let it flow all over the city!". The defendants were cornered by police and beaten. Abbie deduces that Hayden had misspoken, claiming the statement would have started with, "If our blood is going to flow... ." Realizing that mistake would be exploitable on the stand, Hayden asks Abbie to testify. Abbie agrees.

At the end of the trial, Hayden is given a chance by Judge Hoffman, who feels Hayden is genuinely remorseful, to make a case for a lenient sentence. However, over Judge Hoffman's objections, Hayden uses his closing remarks to name the 4,752 soldiers who were killed in the Vietnam War since the trial began. This act prompts many in the court to stand and cheer, with even Schultz choosing to stand out of respect.

== Cast ==
- Eddie Redmayne as Tom Hayden, a leader and one-time President of the Students for a Democratic Society (SDS)
- Sacha Baron Cohen as Abbie Hoffman, founding member of the Youth International Party (Yippies)
- Alex Sharp as Rennie Davis, organizer in Chicago for the National Mobilization Committee to End the War in Vietnam and the national organizer of community organizing for the SDS
- Jeremy Strong as Jerry Rubin, founding member of the Yippies
- John Carroll Lynch as David Dellinger, leader of the National Mobilization Committee to End the War in Vietnam (MOBE)
- Noah Robbins as Lee Weiner
- Daniel Flaherty as John Froines
- Yahya Abdul-Mateen II as Bobby Seale, national chairman of the Black Panther Party and eighth defendant
- Mark Rylance as William Kunstler, defense counsel, co-founder of the Center for Constitutional Rights (CCR), board member of the American Civil Liberties Union (ACLU), and active member of the National Lawyers Guild.
- Joseph Gordon-Levitt as Richard Schultz, assistant federal prosecutor
- Ben Shenkman as Leonard Weinglass, defense counsel
- J. C. MacKenzie as Tom Foran, chief federal prosecutor
- Frank Langella as Judge Julius Hoffman
- Kelvin Harrison Jr. as Fred Hampton, chairman of Illinois Chapter Black Panther Party
- Michael Keaton as Ramsey Clark, United States Attorney General during the riots
- John Doman as John N. Mitchell, United States Attorney General during the trial
- Wayne Duvall as Paul DeLuca, agent assigned to surveil Davis during the protests
- Caitlin FitzGerald as Daphne O'Connor, FBI agent assigned to Rubin, to infiltrate the protests
- Max Adler and C. J. Wilson as Officer Stan Wojohowski and Sergeant Scott Scibelli, undercover police officers
- Damian Young as Howard Ackerman, special advisor to Mitchell
- Alice Kremelberg as Bernardine Dohrn, receptionist in the defendants' office
- Alan Metoskie as Allen Ginsberg

== Production ==
=== Development ===
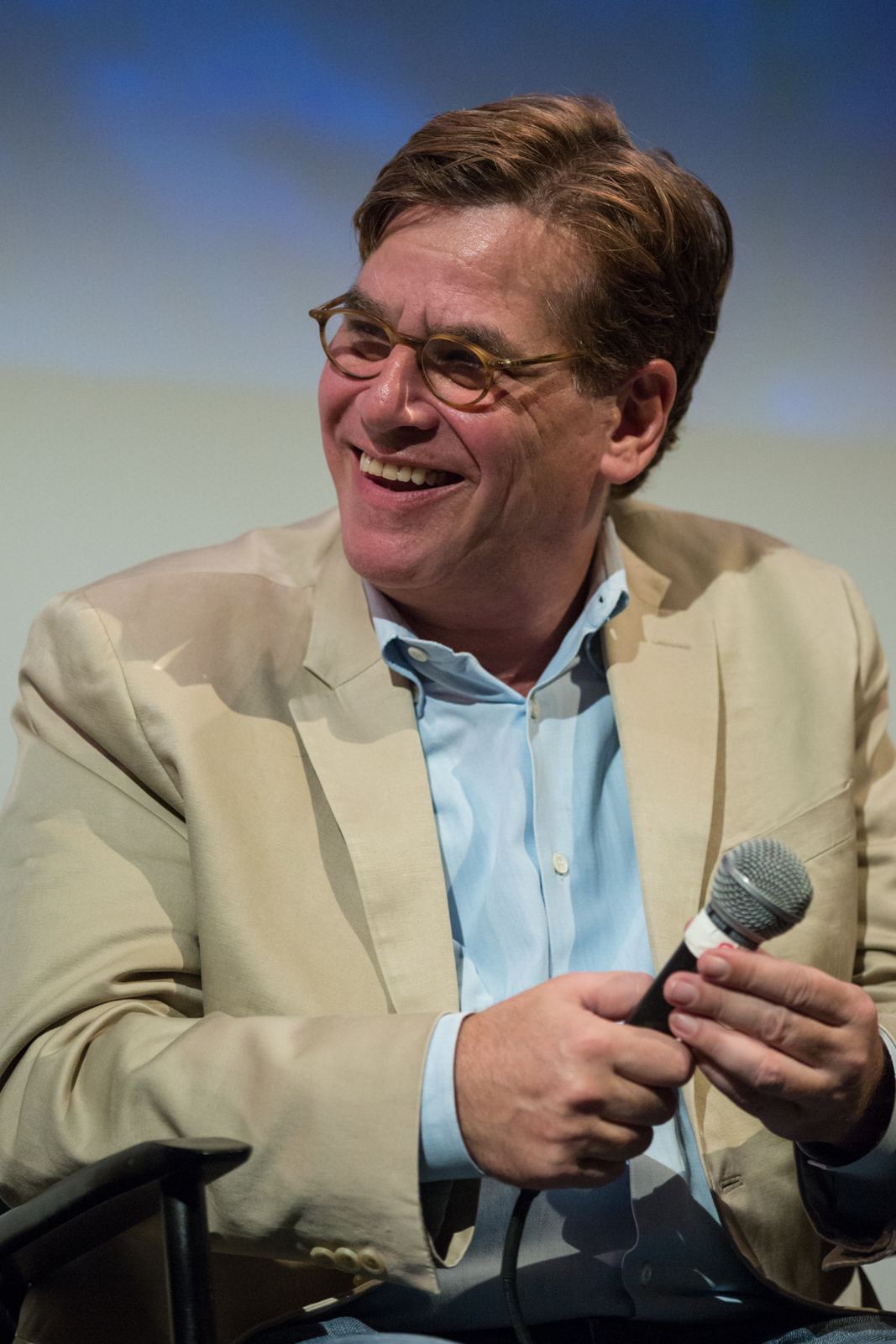
Aaron Sorkin, the film's writer and director

Aaron Sorkin stated to Vanity Fair in July 2020 that he first found out about the planned film during a visit to Steven Spielberg's home in 2006, specifying that Spielberg "told me he wanted to make a movie about the riots at the 1968 Democratic Convention and the trial that followed." He also added that he had no previous knowledge of these events, stating, "I left not knowing what the hell he was talking about."

In July 2007, Sorkin wrote the script for The Trial of the Chicago 7, based on the conspiracy trial of the so-called Chicago 7. Executive producers Spielberg, Walter F. Parkes and Laurie MacDonald collaborated on the development of Sorkin's script, with Spielberg intending to direct the film. In 2007, Spielberg approached Will Smith for the role of Bobby Seale and planned to meet with Heath Ledger about playing Tom Hayden. The Writers Guild of America strike, which started in November 2007 and lasted 100 days, delayed filming and the project was suspended. Sorkin later continued to rewrite the script for Spielberg, and the director intended to mostly cast unknowns to keep the budget down.

In July 2013, it was announced that Paul Greengrass would direct, but he exited the project two months later when a budget could not be agreed upon, and it did not move forward. In July 2020, Vanity Fair reported that Spielberg had decided to resurrect The Trial of the Chicago 7 "a year and a half ago." In October 2018, Sorkin was announced as the director of the film. In December 2018, the film was put on hold due to budgetary concerns, until it was revived and ready for distribution offers, with Paramount Pictures initially picking up distribution rights, as the film was excluded from Amblin Partners' distribution deal with Universal Pictures. Sorkin tells Variety, "Spielberg saw Molly's Game and was sufficiently pleased to suggest I direct Chicago 7 and (Donald) Trump was elected. At his rallies, Trump started being nostalgic about the good old days beating up protestors and the movie became relevant again. At that time, I had no idea how relevant it would come with the deaths of George Floyd, Ahmaud Arbery and Breonna Taylor."

Sorkin was in post-production of The Trial of the Chicago 7 when anti-racism protests started sweeping the country following the police killings of Taylor and Floyd, and tells Entertainment Weekly that he made changes to the film to "add quick cuts to crime scene stills [from Hampton's killing], police stills, black-and-white photographs of the bullet holes in the wall, of a blood-stained mattress, of five police officers almost smiling standing there, and adding the sound effect of a camera shutter," and "now in the world of Rayshard Brooks and Breonna Taylor and George Floyd, having those shots and having one of them be police officers obviously resonates today."

=== Casting ===
In October 2018, Baron Cohen and Eddie Redmayne joined the cast, and in November 2018, Jonathan Majors was added as well. In February 2019, Seth Rogen, Joseph Gordon-Levitt and Alex Sharp joined the cast as well, with Michael Keaton being considered for a role. In August, Frank Langella and Mark Rylance were added to the cast. In September, Jeremy Strong was cast, replacing Rogen. In October, Yahya Abdul-Mateen II joined the cast to replace Majors, with Kelvin Harrison Jr., Keaton, William Hurt, J. C. MacKenzie, Max Adler and Ben Shenkman being added as well.

=== Filming ===
Principal production was set to begin in September 2019, but began the next month in October between Chicago and New Jersey. Filming in Morris County, New Jersey, took place in Hennessy Hall, affectionately known as "The Mansion", on Fairleigh Dickinson University's Florham Park campus and Hyland Hall (located within Henderson Hall) and at Santa Maria at College of Saint Elizabeth; the production also filmed in Grant Park in Chicago, in Hudson County, New Jersey in Hoboken, and at QXT's Nightclub in Newark, New Jersey. The film had a production budget of $35 million, with $11 million going towards the cast.

=== Music ===
The score was written by British composer Daniel Pemberton, who also wrote the score for Aaron Sorkin's 2017 film Molly's Game. The soundtrack, titled The Trial of the Chicago 7 (Music from the Netflix Film), was released digitally under American record label Varèse Sarabande and Universal Music Group on October 16, 2020. The soundtrack features three original songs performed by British singer Celeste, including "Hear My Voice", which served as the lead single and was released on September 30, 2020. The song was also submitted to the 93rd Academy Awards for Best Original Song in September 2020. "Blood on the Streets" was released as a promotional single on October 9, 2020, a day before the release of both the soundtrack and film. A physical CD edition of the soundtrack was released on November 20, 2020.

Recording of the soundtrack took place in Studio Two at Abbey Road Studios and was conducted by Sam Okell, with assistance from Christopher Parker and Jack Thomason.

== Release ==
The Trial of the Chicago 7 was originally scheduled by Paramount Pictures to begin a limited theatrical release on September 25, 2020, before going wide on October 16, 2020. On June 20, 2020, due to the movie theater closures because of COVID-19 pandemic restrictions, it was reported Netflix was in negotiations to acquire rights to the film.

On July 1, 2020, the company officially closed a $56 million deal to distribute the film. It was released in selected theaters on September 25, 2020, Paramount's original date, and was made available digitally on Netflix on October 16. Although Netflix does not publicly release the box office results of its films, Deadline Hollywood reported that the film averaged about 10 people per show at the 100 theaters it was playing in its opening weekend.

Upon its digital release, it was the second-most streamed film over its debut weekend, which IndieWire called "higher than usual for a more-serious entry Netflix title." It finished in tenth the following weekend. In November, Variety reported the film was the eighth-most watched straight-to-streaming title of 2020 up to that point. In March 2021, Variety reported the film was among Netflix's most-watched Oscar-nominated titles, and assigned it an "audience appeal score" of 58 out 100.

== Reception ==
=== Critical response ===
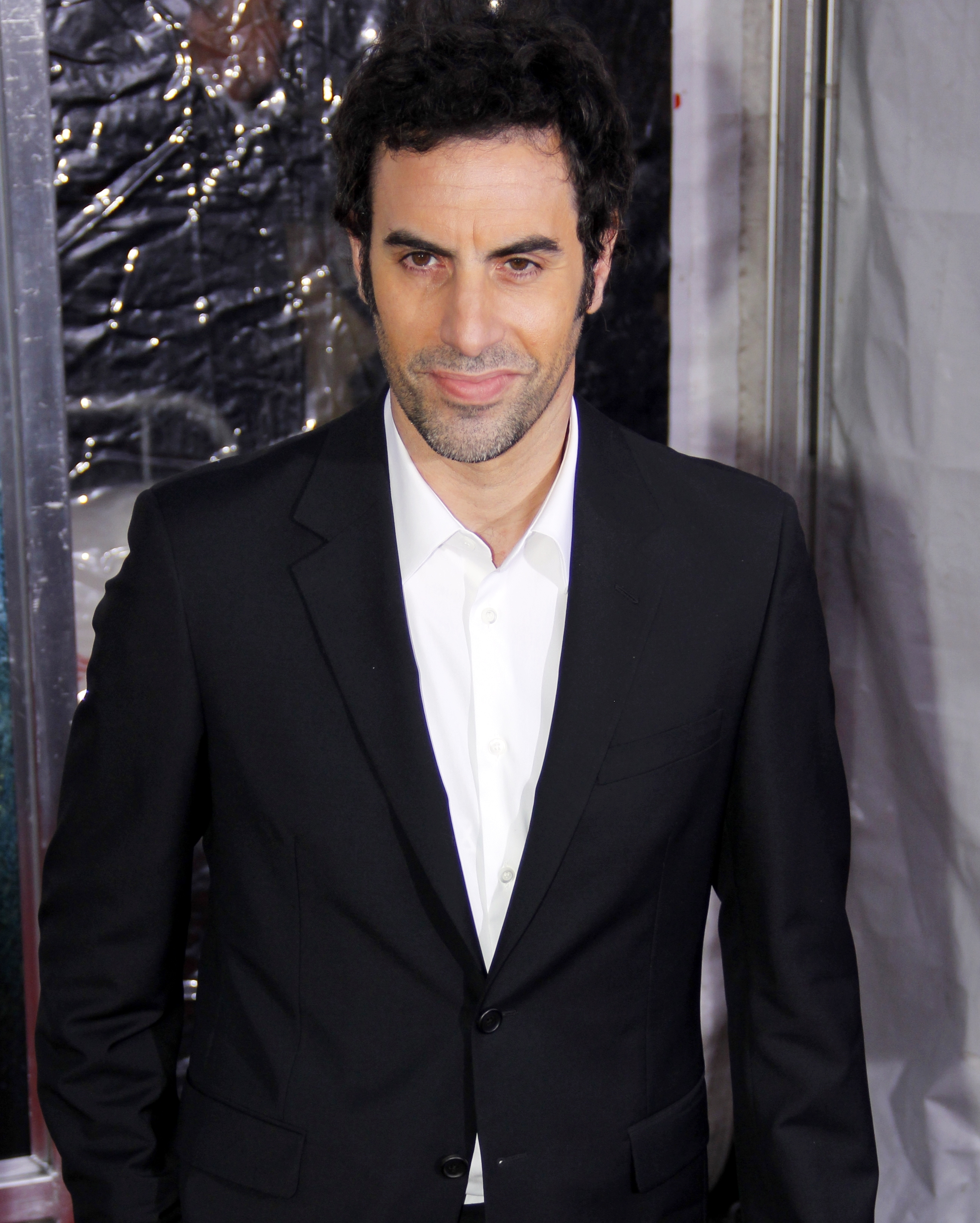
Sacha Baron Cohen's performance garnered critical acclaim, earning him a nomination for the Academy Award for Best Supporting Actor.

On the review aggregator website Rotten Tomatoes, 89% of 344 critics' reviews are positive, with an average rating of 7.8/10. The website's consensus reads: "An actors' showcase enlivened by its topical fact-based story, The Trial of the Chicago 7 plays squarely – and compellingly – to Aaron Sorkin's strengths" On Metacritic, the film has a weighted average score of 76 out of 100 based on 49 critics, indicating "generally favorable reviews".

Writing for the Chicago Sun-Times, Richard Roeper gave the film four out of four stars, saying: "Certain events are rearranged from the factual timelines, and yes, The Trial of the Chicago 7 exercises poetic license. This is not a documentary; it's a dramatization of events that resonates with great power while containing essential truths, and it's one of the best movies of the year." IndieWire's Eric Kohn gave the film a "B," saying Sorkin "directs his own blunt, energetic screenplay with the convictions of a storyteller fully committed to the tropes at hand," and that Sacha Baron Cohen "steals the show." Owen Gleiberman of Variety praised Baron Cohen's and Redmayne's performances, and said: "Sorkin has structured The Trial of the Chicago 7 ingeniously, so that it's never about just one thing. It's about the theatrical insanity of the war in the courtroom, about how the government would stop at nothing (including flagrant attempts at jury tampering), and about the politics, at once planned and spontaneous, of how the Chicago protests unfolded." John DeFore of The Hollywood Reporter wrote: "Sorkin has made a movie that's gripping, illuminating and trenchant [...] It's as much about the constitutional American right to protest as it is about justice, which makes it incredibly relevant to where we are today."

=== Accolades ===
The Trial of the Chicago 7 appeared on 39 critics' year-end top-10 lists, including first place on three. The film earned six nominations at the 93rd Academy Awards, including Best Picture and Best Supporting Actor for Baron Cohen and Best Original Screenplay for Sorkin. It further received three British Academy Film Award nominations for Best Film, Best Original Screenplay and Best Editing. At the 78th Golden Globe Awards, the film received five nominations, including Best Motion Picture – Drama and won for Best Screenplay. At the 27th Screen Actors Guild Awards it won the award Outstanding Performance by a Cast in a Motion Picture.

== Historicity ==
The film takes liberties with timelines and occasionally with the depiction of who did what. Various writers have complained of these distortions. Jeremy Kagan, the writer and director of the 1987 film Conspiracy: The Trial of the Chicago 8, said: "Sorkin is a gifted director and brilliant writer, but I am concerned that the generations who did not live through this time will now think of this version as what happened. And it wasn't and isn't. It is an interpretation." Nathan J. Robinson of Current Affairs wrote: "Sorkin takes [...] creative liberties with history that end up distorting it," including in how "Bobby Seale, the Black Panther defendant who was infamously bound and gagged in the courtroom [...] actually managed to repeatedly wriggle out of the physical restraints the government put on him; the film portrays the government as effective in silencing him." Robinson also criticized what he claimed was an untrue historical representation of Abbie Hoffman and the absurd actions he did during the trial. Arionne Nettles of the Chicago Reader gave the film three stars and observed that it also "shows Fred Hampton, chairman of the Illinois chapter of the Black Panther Party, supporting Seale—until police killed him in his home, in his bed, on December 4, 1969," noting, "The onscreen timeline of these events, however, are different. The film shows Seale being gagged the day after Hampton was killed, when he was actually gagged on October 29 and severed from the case on November 6."

Matthew Dessem at Slate offered a comparison of some of the film's events and characters to the actual history and suggested that Sorkin "plays pretty freely with characters and events to ensure his clockwork screenplay hits exactly the right beats in exactly the right order." Jordan Hoffman of The Times of Israel criticized the film for obscuring or otherwise erasing the Jewish heritage of much of the Chicago 7, particularly of Hoffman and Rubin. Kurt Jacobsen of Logos: A Journal of Modern Society & Culture regarded the film as a centrist travesty, with pacifist David Dellinger fictionally punching a court cop, the committed movement attorney William Kunstler behaving like a clueless schoolmaster, Jerry Rubin preposterously falling for an undercover female agent, and the Tom Hayden character ventriloquizing nothing but Sorkin's opinions.

Several critics discussed the conclusion of the film, including Jeremy Kagan, who wrote: "While this works as effective narrative cinema, it was David Dellinger [not Tom Hayden] who read the names, as shown in my film. It was also earlier in the trial [...] and he read the names of the Vietnamese as well as Americans who had died." In a review for The New York Times, Jason Bailey quoted the sentencing statement from Rennie Davis to Judge Hoffman: "You represent all that is old, ugly, bigoted, and repressive in this country, and I will tell you that the spirit of this defense table will devour your sickness in the next generation," which Bailey described as "the most Sorkin-eseque dialogue in the transcript," and its exclusion from the film as "downright baffling". Arionne Nettles of the Chicago Reader, who found Sorkin's portrayal of Fred Hampton in the film made it "hard to not think of Breonna Taylor's similar death earlier this year," wrote, "although this dramatized ending did not actually occur this way, it makes a statement: there's a responsibility to stand up when the world is watching, to remember those who lost their lives, and to say their names."
