= Andrew S. Effron =

American judge (born 1948)

Andrew Effron
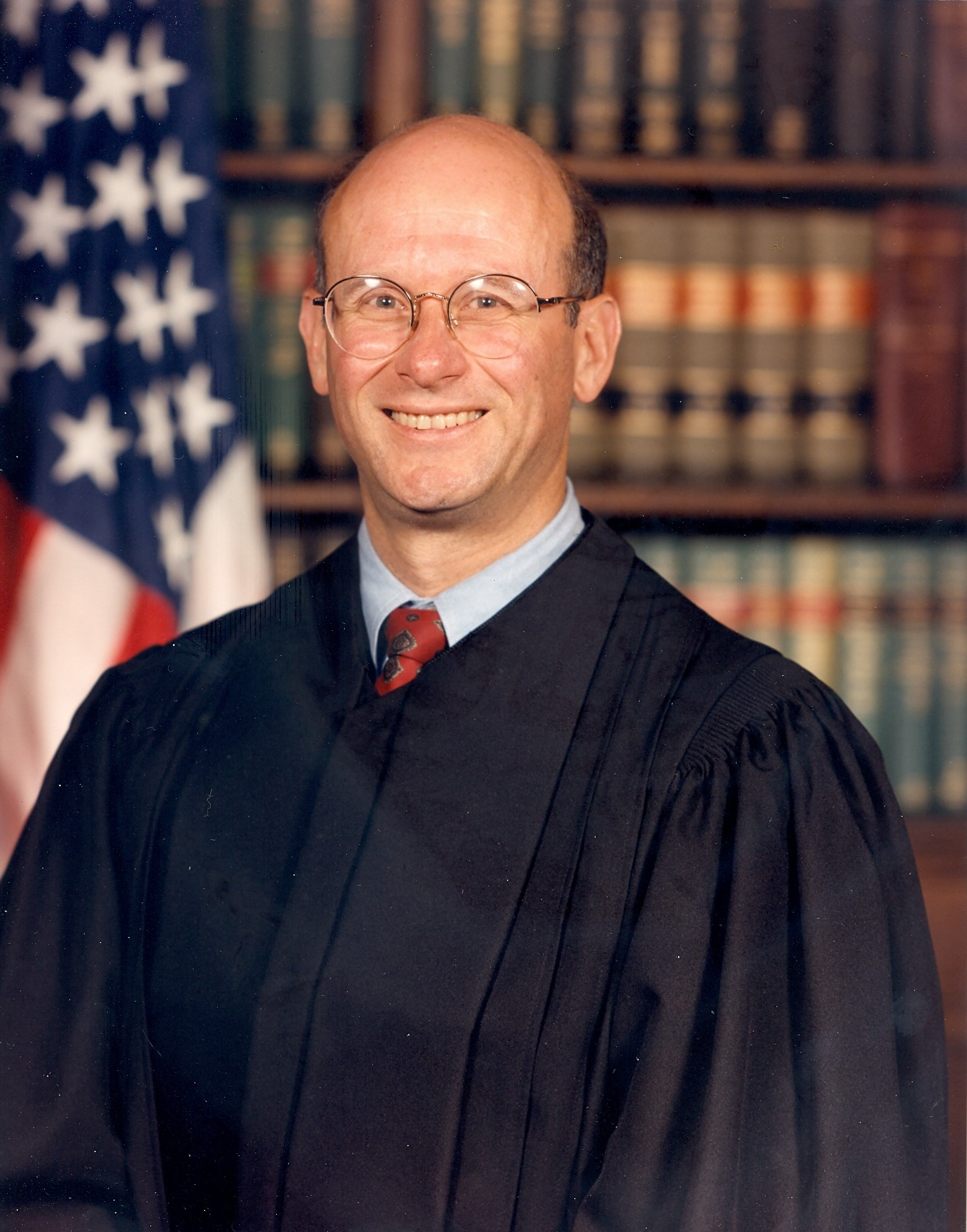

Senior Judge of the United States Court of Appeals for the Armed Forces
- Incumbent
- Assumed office September 30, 2011

Chief Judge of the United States Court of Appeals for the Armed Forces
- In office September 30, 2006 – September 30, 2011
- Preceded by: H. F. Gierke III
- Succeeded by: James E. Baker

Judge of the United States Court of Appeals for the Armed Forces
- In office August 1, 1996 – September 30, 2011
- Appointed by: Bill Clinton
- Preceded by: Robert E. Wiss
- Succeeded by: Kevin A. Ohlson

Personal details
- Born: Andrew Samuel Effron; September 18, 1948 (age 77) Stamford, Connecticut, U.S.
- Spouse: Barbara Lubotsky
- Children: 2
- Education: Harvard University (BA, JD)

Military service
- Allegiance: United States
- Branch/service: United States Army
- Years of service: 1976–1994
- Rank: Major
- Awards: Defense Meritorious Service Medal; Meritorious Service Medal

Andrew Samuel Effron (born September 18, 1948) is an American lawyer who serves as a senior judge of the United States Court of Appeals for the Armed Forces. He took his judicial oath on August 1, 1996, and became chief judge in 2006. His term expired September 30, 2011.

== Early life and education ==
Effron was born in Stamford, Connecticut, and grew up in Poughkeepsie, New York. He is a 1966 graduate of Poughkeepsie High School. Effron earned a Bachelor of Arts degree from Harvard College in 1970 and then received a Juris Doctor from Harvard Law School in 1975, and also graduated from The Judge Advocate General's Legal Center and School at the University of Virginia.

== Career ==
From 1970 to 1976, Effron worked for Congressman William A. Steiger.

Effron served on active duty in the United States Army Judge Advocate General's Corps from 1976 to 1979 and then as a reserve officer until 1994.

Effron served as associate general counsel at the Department of Defense from 1979 to 1987, and then served the Senate Armed Services Committee before being appointed to the federal court.

== Personal ==
Effron is the son of Marshall Roven Effron and Marion Nancy (Glickman) Effron. He has a brother and a sister. His father was an officer in the Army Air Corps during World War II and his mother was a civilian employee of the Military Intelligence Division at the War Department. They were married in 1947.

Legal offices
Preceded by Robert E. Wiss	Judge of the United States Court of Appeals for the Armed Forces; 1996–2011	Succeeded by Kevin A. Ohlson
Preceded by H. F. Gierke III	Chief Judge of the United States Court of Appeals for the Armed Forces; 2006–2011	Succeeded by James E. Baker
