= Jim Regnier =

American judge from Montana (born 1944)

Justice of the Montana Supreme Court
- In office 1997–2004
- Preceded by: Charles Erdmann
- Succeeded by: Brian Morris

Personal details
- Born: July 22, 1944 (age 82) Aurora, Illinois, U.S.
- Party: Democratic
- Spouse: Linda
- Children: 3
- Education: Marquette University (BS); University of Illinois College of Law (JD)

Jim Regnier (born July 22, 1944) was a justice of the Montana Supreme Court from 1997 to 2004.

Born in Aurora, Illinois, Regnier received a B.S. from Marquette University in 1966 and a J.D. from the University of Illinois College of Law in 1973. After working in private practice for five years, Regnier moved to Great Falls, Montana, where he worked in private practice. In 1991, he moved to Missoula, Montana, and in 1997 he was elected to the Montana Supreme Court.

Legal offices
Preceded by Charles Erdmann	Justice of the Montana Supreme Court; 1997–2004	Succeeded by Brian Morris
