= Fred J. Weber =

American judge (1919–2007)

Justice of the Montana Supreme Court
- In office 1981–1995
- Preceded by: Newly created seat
- Succeeded by: Charles E. Erdmann

Personal details
- Born: October 6, 1919 Deer Lodge, Montana, U.S.
- Died: May 11, 2007 Helena, Montana, U.S.
- Spouse: Phyllis Schell (m. 1951)
- Children: 4
- Education: University of Montana (B.A., J.D.)
- Occupation: Justice of the Montana Supreme Court

Fred J. Weber (October 6, 1919 – May 11, 2007) was a justice of the Montana Supreme Court from 1981 to 1995.

== Education, military service, and career ==
Born in Deer Lodge, Montana, to Victor and Dorothy Weber, he received his B.A. and J.D. degrees from the University of Montana. During World War II, Weber enlisted in the ROTC, and later joined the 10th Mountain Division, serving in the infantry.

Weber engaged in the private practice of law in Havre, Montana, from 1947 to 1980, when he was elected to one of two newly-created seats the Montana Supreme Court, where he remained for fifteen years.

== Personal life and death ==
In June 1951, Weber married Phyllis Schell, with whom he had three sons and a daughter.

Weber died at his apartment in Helena at the age of 87.

Political offices
Preceded by Newly created seat	Justice of the Montana Supreme Court; 1981–1995	Succeeded by Charles E. Erdmann
