= Scott W. Stucky =

American judge (born 1948)

Scott Stucky
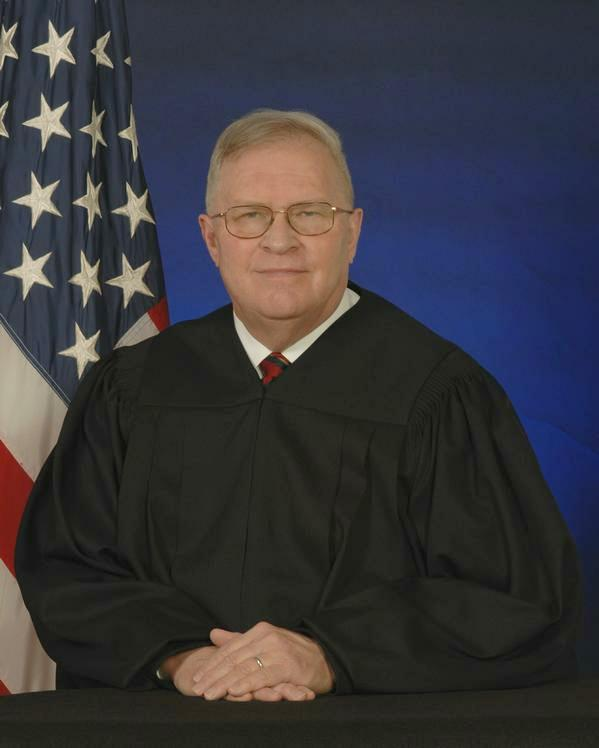

Senior Judge of the United States Court of Appeals for the Armed Forces
- Incumbent
- Assumed office July 31, 2021

Chief Judge of the United States Court of Appeals for the Armed Forces
- In office July 31, 2017 – July 31, 2021
- Preceded by: Charles E. Erdmann
- Succeeded by: Kevin A. Ohlson

Judge of the United States Court of Appeals for the Armed Forces
- In office December 20, 2006 – July 31, 2021
- Appointed by: George W. Bush
- Preceded by: Susan J. Crawford
- Succeeded by: M. Tia Johnson

Personal details
- Born: Scott Wallace Stucky; January 11, 1948 (age 78) Hutchinson, Kansas, U.S.
- Education: Wichita State University (BA); Harvard University (JD); Trinity University (MA); George Washington University (LLM)

Military service
- Allegiance: United States
- Branch/service: United States Air Force
- Years of service: 1970–2003
- Rank: Colonel
- Awards: Legion of Merit; Meritorious Service Medal (3)

Scott Wallace Stucky (born January 11, 1948) is a Senior Judge of the United States Court of Appeals for the Armed Forces. His term as a judge began on December 20, 2006, and expired on July 31, 2021.

== Education ==
Stucky graduated from Pretty Prairie Rural High School in Kansas in 1966. He then earned a Bachelor of Arts in history with Omicron Delta Kappa honors in 1970 from Wichita State University where he received a commission as a second lieutenant, U.S. Air Force Reserve, through ROTC. He earned his Juris Doctor from Harvard Law School in 1973. In addition to his undergraduate and legal degrees, Stucky holds master's degrees in history from Trinity University and in international law from the George Washington University Law School.

== Legal and judicial career ==
Stucky served as an Air Force judge advocate on active duty from 1973 to 1978. He was legislative counsel and principal legislative counsel to the Department of the Air Force from 1983 to 1996, where he worked on such legislation as the Goldwater-Nichols Act and legislative responses to the First Gulf War. From 1996 to 2006, he served as general counsel and minority counsel to the Senate Committee on Armed Services. He was appointed to the Court by President George W. Bush on December 20, 2006. Stucky is a retired colonel in the Air Force Reserve, and was awarded the Legion of Merit for outstanding service upon his retirement in 2003. His judicial term ended on July 31, 2021, and he assumed senior status thereafter.

Legal offices
Preceded by Susan Crawford	Judge of the United States Court of Appeals for the Armed Forces; 2006–2021	Succeeded by M. Tia Johnson
Preceded by Charles Erdmann	Chief Judge of the United States Court of Appeals for the Armed Forces; 2017–2021	Succeeded by Kevin A. Ohlson
