= Eugene R. Sullivan =

American judge (b. 1941)

Eugene Sullivan
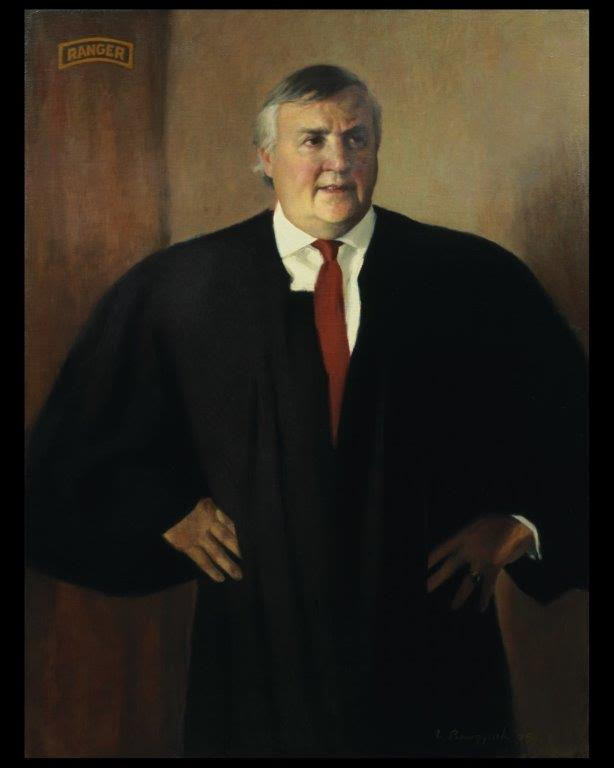
- Official portrait

Senior judge of the United States Court of Appeals for the Armed Forces
- Incumbent
- Assumed office September 30, 2002

Chief judge of the United States Court of Appeals for the Armed Forces
- In office September 30, 1990 – October 1, 1995
- Preceded by: Robinson O. Everett
- Succeeded by: Walter T. Cox III

Judge of the United States Court of Appeals for the Armed Forces
- In office May 27, 1986 – September 30, 2002
- Appointed by: Ronald Reagan
- Preceded by: Albert Fletcher
- Succeeded by: Charles E. Erdmann

Personal details
- Born: Eugene Raymond Sullivan; August 2, 1941 (age 85) St. Louis, Missouri, U.S.
- Education: United States Military Academy (BS); Georgetown University Law Center (JD)

Eugene Raymond Sullivan (born August 2, 1941) is an American lawyer, former United States Army officer, and senior judge of the United States Court of Appeals for the Armed Forces. A graduate of the United States Military Academy, Sullivan served on active duty in the Army from 1964 to 1969, including service with the 4th Infantry Division in Vietnam. His military decorations include the Bronze Star Medal and Air Medal.

After graduating from Georgetown University Law Center, Sullivan served on President Richard Nixon's defense team during the Watergate scandal. He later worked as a trial attorney for the United States Department of Justice, served as General Counsel of the Department of the Air Force, and served as chief legal adviser to the National Reconnaissance Office. He was also governor of Wake Island from 1984 to 1986.

President Ronald Reagan nominated Sullivan to the U.S. Court of Military Appeals on February 25, 1986. The United States Senate confirmed him on May 20, and he assumed office on May 27. President George H. W. Bush named Sullivan chief judge effective October 1, 1990, a position he held for five years. He is currently listed by the court as a senior judge. In 2010, Sullivan was inducted into the U.S. Army Ranger Hall of Fame. A tribute to his service was read into the Congressional Record on June 5, 2002.

== Early life and education ==
Sullivan was born on August 2, 1941, in St. Louis, Missouri. He graduated from St. Louis University High School in 1959. Sullivan later attended the United States Military Academy at West Point, graduating with a Bachelor of Science degree in 1964. While at West Point, he was a member of the Cadet Honor Committee and the varsity lacrosse team.

During this period, West Point's Honor Code was administered by the Corps of Cadets and carried significant consequences. A May 24, 1960, letter from the Cadet Honor Committee to incoming West Point candidates stated that the sole penalty for a violation of the Honor Code was separation from the Academy. In a 2000 interview with Assembly, Sullivan said that serving as an Honor Representative fostered his concern for justice and, later, his appreciation for individual rights, helping lead him toward a legal career.

Sullivan returned to issues involving the West Point honor system later in his career. In 1988 and 1989, he served on a federal commission reviewing the West Point Honor Code. He later became a trustee emeritus and founding chair of the Ethics Committee of the West Point Association of Graduates. He also served on the Board of Directors of the Duke University School of Law Center on Law, Ethics and National Security when the center was established in 1993.

== Military service ==
Following his graduation from West Point with a B.S. degree in 1964, Sullivan served in the United States Army for five years. He qualified as a tanker, an Airborne Ranger, a Ranger instructor, and a jumpmaster. He was awarded the Bronze Star Medal, the Air Medal, and other decorations for his service in Vietnam.

Lieutenant Sullivan completed Airborne and Ranger schools before being assigned to Germany as a tank platoon commander. He later served as the battalion scout platoon leader in the 2nd Battalion, 33rd Armor Regiment. After his tour in Germany, he was posted to Fort Benning, where he served as a Ranger instructor at Ranger School.

From Fort Benning, Sullivan was assigned to the Army Aviation Systems Command (AVSCOM), where he worked on research and development assignments. His work included the T53 and T55 engines used in the UH-1 and CH-47 helicopters. His military decorations also included the Army Commendation Medal.

Captain Sullivan was then assigned in Vietnam to the 2d Squadron, 1st Armored Cavalry, attached to the 4th Infantry Division in the Central Highlands. After about six months, he was detailed to Military Assistance Command, Vietnam (MACV) headquarters in Saigon as an aide to MACV Science Advisor Nils F. Wikner. In a 2000 interview, Sullivan recalled that the Science Advisor's office oversaw the introduction of scientific equipment and weapons systems, including surveillance devices used on the Ho Chi Minh trail.

One of the projects Sullivan worked on in this assignment was the covert monitoring operation known as Operation Igloo White. Sullivan also traveled several times to Nakhon Phanom Royal Thai Air Force Base in Thailand. On another project, drawing on his Ranger School experience with demolitions, he served as the principal adviser on a study of methods to prevent Viet Cong sappers from destroying bridges around Saigon.

While working full time in the Science Advisor's Office, Sullivan also volunteered to serve as an M60 door gunner on an attack helicopter flying night patrols along the Saigon River. He later recalled completing more than 25 combat missions in that role. His Vietnam decorations included the Air Medal and Bronze Star Medal.

After leaving active duty, Sullivan later served in the U.S. Army Reserve. In his 2000 Assembly interview, he stated that he had reached the rank of lieutenant colonel by the time he was appointed to the federal bench in 1986.

In 2006, Sullivan was selected as a distinguished member of the Ranger Training Brigade.

== Legal education and career ==
After leaving the Army, Sullivan earned his Juris Doctor from Georgetown University Law Center in 1971. During his final year, he served as an editor of the Georgetown Law Journal.

Following law school, Sullivan clerked for Chief Judge Marion Charles Matthes of the United States Court of Appeals for the Eighth Circuit. When his clerkship ended in 1972, he joined the Washington, D.C., law firm of Patton Boggs, now Squire Patton Boggs. He worked primarily with senior partner Tommy Boggs and assisted him in lobbying Congress and federal agencies on behalf of major corporations and foreign governments. Sullivan is a member of the bars of the District of Columbia and Missouri.

=== Watergate scandal ===
In early 1974, Sullivan joined the White House legal team led by James D. St. Clair, President Richard Nixon's special counsel during the Watergate scandal. Sullivan later recalled that a personal connection led to an interview with St. Clair, who was recruiting young lawyers for the defense team, and that St. Clair hired him two days after they met.

Sullivan worked on the president's defense during the congressional impeachment proceedings and in related Watergate litigation before Judge John J. Sirica in the United States District Court for the District of Columbia.

Sullivan and fellow West Point graduate Mac Howard, who later also became a federal judge, were members of St. Clair's staff. They were the primary representatives for the president observing the impeachment hearings before the House of Representatives.

When the case reached the Supreme Court, Sullivan was listed among the attorneys for the President on the July 1, 1974 reply brief. Sullivan later said that Professor Charles Alan Wright, who was overseeing preparation of the White House reply brief, chose him as one of a small group of lawyers to help write it. Sullivan was assigned the portion dealing with Rule 17 and the scope of the subpoena served on President Nixon for the Watergate tapes.

=== U.S. Department of Justice trial attorney (1974–1982) ===
After Nixon resigned on August 9, 1974, Sullivan left the White House and joined the United States Department of Justice as a nonpolitical trial attorney, a position he held for eight years. Sullivan also volunteered to serve as a federal prosecutor to gain experience trying criminal cases before juries. As a prosecutor, he served as co-counsel in felony drug and gun cases in the U.S. District Court in Washington, D.C., obtaining convictions in those cases.

=== General counsel of National Reconnaissance Office ===
In 1982, after becoming deputy general counsel of the U.S. Department of the Air Force, Sullivan also became general counsel of the National Reconnaissance Office (NRO), serving in that position concurrently with his Air Force duties until 1986. At the time, the NRO was a covert U.S. intelligence agency responsible for satellite reconnaissance. In a 2000 interview, Sullivan described his NRO work as part of the highly classified "black" world and said that he served as chief legal adviser to the then-secret satellite intelligence agency.

Sullivan's position as NRO general counsel was not known to Air Force leadership or even to his wife while he held the post. His duties included legal oversight of contracts involving cover companies and security matters intended to protect the secrecy of NRO operations, and his work brought him into frequent contact with Stanley Sporkin, then general counsel of the Central Intelligence Agency. Sporkin and Sullivan were both later appointed to the federal bench by President Ronald Reagan.

The existence of the NRO remained classified throughout Sullivan's tenure. The Department of Defense publicly acknowledged the agency on September 18, 1992.

One significant issue during Sullivan's tenure concerned NRO Director Edward "Pete" Aldridge's decision to preserve expendable launch vehicles rather than rely exclusively on the Space Shuttle for national-security launches. Sullivan was consulted on the decision. Aldridge later recalled that in 1983 he recommended continuing production of expendable launch vehicles until the Shuttle had demonstrated that it could reliably meet Department of Defense requirements. Official NRO histories credit Aldridge's efforts with helping to keep the Titan production line operating.

After the Challenger disaster in January 1986, Shuttle operations were suspended, demonstrating the importance of retaining an alternative launch capability for national-security satellites.

=== 14th general counsel of the U.S. Air Force ===
Sullivan became acting general counsel of the U.S. Department of the Air Force on March 2, 1984, and general counsel on March 12, serving in that position until May 26, 1986. In a 2000 interview, Sullivan recalled that after joining the Pentagon he was selected first as deputy general counsel and later as general counsel of the Air Force. As general counsel, he served as the Air Force's chief legal officer and chief ethics official.

Space law was one of the areas addressed during Sullivan's tenure. By the early 1980s, the Air Force General Counsel and the Judge Advocate General were sponsoring the biennial Conference on the Law Relating to National Security Activities in Outer Space. Sullivan chaired a three-day classified conference in Colorado Springs attended by invited representatives of the Air Force, CIA, NRO, and Department of State, and persuaded Professor Carl Sagan to serve without compensation as the keynote speaker at the conference dinner at Peterson Air Force Base.

Another issue during Sullivan's tenure involved the Global Positioning System (GPS). In 1983, President Ronald Reagan announced that GPS would be made available for civilian use once the system became operational. Sullivan worked on legal questions arising from civilian use of GPS, including potential government liability for accidents attributed to GPS malfunctions.

Sullivan's service as Air Force general counsel ended on May 26, 1986. The following day, he took the oath of office as a judge of the United States Court of Military Appeals.

=== Governor of Wake Island ===
In addition, from 1984 to 1986, Sullivan served as the governor of Wake Island, a small strategic island approximately midway between Hawaii and Japan that is a U.S. territory. Wake Island was important in the 1930s and 1940s as a trans-Pacific aviation stop and military base. The Japanese captured the island in December 1941 during the Battle of Wake Island and occupied it until Japan's surrender in 1945, when Wake returned to U.S. control.

Under the Wake Island Code, executive authority over the island was assigned to the Air Force general counsel. The general counsel could delegate functions to Air Force officers and employees and appointed the judges of the Wake Island Court and Court of Appeals, as well as the Island Attorney and Public Defender. Wake Island was designated a National Historic Landmark on September 16, 1985.

Later that year, Pan American World Airways' China Clipper II, a Boeing 747, flew to Midway and Wake as part of a reenactment marking the 50th anniversary of Pan Am's trans-Pacific service.

=== Federal judicial service ===
Sullivan was appointed to the United States Court of Military Appeals by President Ronald Reagan in 1986. In 1990, President George H. W. Bush named him chief judge of the court, a position he held for five years. The court was renamed the United States Court of Appeals for the Armed Forces in 1994. It is an independent civilian appellate court established under Article I of the Constitution, with its decisions subject to review by the U.S. Supreme Court in specified cases. Sullivan's regular judicial term ended on September 30, 2001, but he continued serving in full active service as a senior judge at the court's request until September 30, 2002. He remains listed by the court as a senior judge.

While serving as chief judge, Sullivan played a leading role in restoring the court's historic courtroom to its original appearance. His contribution was acknowledged by Judge Scott Stucky during the courthouse's centennial ceremony on October 1, 2010. Completed in 1910, the building was the first federal courthouse in Washington, D.C., constructed specifically for that purpose. Originally built for the U.S. Court of Appeals for the District of Columbia Circuit, it has remained in use as an appellate courthouse since its opening and is listed on the National Register of Historic Places.

During Sullivan's tenure as chief judge, the court expanded its Project Outreach program, conducting oral arguments at law schools, military installations, and other locations outside Washington, D.C. In fiscal year 1993, the court held hearings at six locations outside its Washington courthouse. One such hearing, in United States v. Hagee, took place on May 19, 1993, aboard the aircraft carrier USS John F. Kennedy while it was underway in the Atlantic Ocean conducting flight operations.

The hearing reportedly took place approximately 300 miles off the coast of the United States, beyond the 12-nautical-mile limit of U.S. territorial waters, to demonstrate the global reach of the Uniform Code of Military Justice and the court's jurisdiction. The president of the American Bar Association, the deputy attorney general of the United States, and defense attorney F. Lee Bailey were reportedly among the observers. Many of the approximately 5,000 sailors aboard the aircraft carrier witnessed the hearing in person or via CCTV.

=== International judicial conferences and debates between England and the United States ===
==== Conferences ====
During his judicial service, Sullivan chaired the International Judicial Conference (Criminal Law). The conferences were generally held at the court's courthouse in Washington, D.C., although three were hosted in Canada, England, and Denmark. Participating judges came from Denmark, England, Germany, Ireland, Canada, Colombia, Romania, the Republic of China, Australia, Hungary, and the United States.

The themes of the conferences were based on Sullivan's observations of judicial proceedings at the Old Bailey and the Royal Courts of Justice in London, the High Court of Hong Kong, and the High Court in Dublin, as well as a civil trial in Nykøbing Falster, Denmark. The theme of a conference reportedly held in Copenhagen in 2002 was "What is the structure of the perfect judicial system of justice in a democracy?"

==== Debates on judicial reform between England and America ====
For several years, Sullivan organized and chaired a series of debates between England and the United States, known as the "Great Debate," examining differences between the two countries' judicial systems. In the United States, debates were held at Georgetown University Law Center, Harvard Law School, and Duke University. In London, debates were held at the U.S. Embassy. Other debates were reportedly held at Gray's Inn in London.

English debaters included Judge Graham Boal, Judge Brian Capstick, Judge Neil Denison, then Common Serjeant of London, Master Michael McKenzie, Judge James Rant, and Sir Richard Tucker. American debaters included Sullivan, Judge Stanley Sporkin, Harvard Law professor Charles Ogletree, Judge Kenneth Starr, attorney F. Lee Bailey, and attorney Brendan Sullivan. Other reported participants included English judges Brian Barker and Sir Philip Otton, and American attorney Thomas Hale Boggs Jr.

Debate topics included differences in criminal jury verdict requirements, whether jurors should be permitted to discuss their deliberations after a trial, and the respective roles of judges and juries. The 1997 Harvard debate also examined defendants' silence, appellate decisions, and the use of judicial law clerks. Other reported topics included the appointment of judges by the Crown in England compared with the election of judges in many American states.

In 1996, Sullivan and legal scholar Akhil Reed Amar coauthored "Jury Reform in America—A Return to the Old Country," published in the American Criminal Law Review. The article examined proposed reforms to the American jury system and included a transcript of an earlier Great Debate between American and English legal professionals.

==== Other international rule of law activities ====
Judge Sullivan participated in other international legal conferences, including the 2004 Symposium on a New Constitution for Taiwan, held in Taipei on November 29, 2004. According to the published symposium proceedings, Sullivan served as the U.S. discussant in the Round Table Forum, alongside representatives from Taiwan, Germany, France, and Japan. Former president of the Republic of China Lee Teng-hui also participated in the symposium, which addressed constitutional reform in Taiwan.

Sullivan also participated in advocacy efforts by former senior U.S. government officials concerning the protection of Iranian opposition members residing at Camp Ashraf in Iraq. Those involved in the broader effort included former senators, senior military officers, judges, diplomats, and intelligence officials. In April 2012, Sullivan and retired Marine Corps General James T. Conway were among those who questioned the continued designation of the People's Mojahedin Organization of Iran (MEK) as a foreign terrorist organization and called for the protection of Camp Ashraf residents until they could be resettled in other countries. Sullivan also addressed the issue in a recorded statement commemorating the anniversary of the April 8, 2011, attack on Camp Ashraf.

== Literary career ==
Sullivan is the author of two published novels, both legal and political thrillers set primarily in Washington, D.C. His first novel, The Majority Rules (2005), follows Tim Quinn, a West Point graduate and Vietnam veteran who leaves private law practice to become a federal judge and encounters corruption within the judiciary. The novel was reviewed by Kirkus Reviews and Publishers Weekly. Journalist Joseph L. Galloway, co-author of We Were Soldiers Once... and Young, was among those who endorsed the novel.

His second novel, The Report to the Judiciary (2008), continues the story of Quinn, who becomes involved in an investigation surrounding the nomination of a new Chief Justice of the United States. The novel was reviewed by Publishers Weekly and received an endorsement from author David Baldacci.

Sullivan also served for many years as the non-voting chair of the judging panel for the International Dublin Literary Award, beginning in 2003. The position involved overseeing discussions among an international panel of judges responsible for selecting the winning novel. In a 2016 account published in The Irish Times, fellow judge and novelist Carlo Gébler described Sullivan's role in directing the panel's deliberations. The award, sponsored by Dublin City Council, carries a prize of €100,000 for a single work of fiction originally written in English or translated into English.

== Personal life ==
Sullivan is married to Lis Urup Sullivan (née Johansen) from Nykøbing Falster, Denmark, who is a social anthropologist, having done field work in rural China and Taiwan, and an artist, making stained glass windows, artwork in porcelain and oil painting. They have two children: Kim Sullivan attended Columbia University (B.A. and graduate studies) and is a TV photo producer/editor in New York City. Eugene R. Sullivan II attended the Lawrenceville School, Duke University (B.A.), the London School of Economics (LL.B), and Columbia Law School (LL.M); he is now a lawyer in Washington, D.C.

== Civilian career honors and awards ==
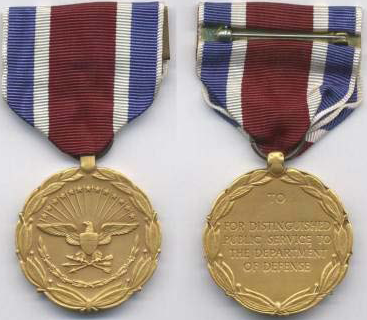
- U.S. Department of Defense Medal for Distinguished Public Service
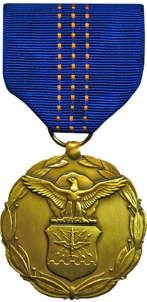
- U.S. Department of the Air Force Exceptional Civilian Service Medal
- Ellis Island Medal of Honor
- First Class Medal of Defense (Hungary)
- Medal of Justice (Romania)
- Defense Minister's Citation of Merit (Republic of China)
- Honorary Doctor of Laws degree (LL.D.), New England School of Law
- Trustee emeritus and founding chair of the Ethics Committee, West Point Association of Graduates
- Former trustee, Air Force Aid Society
- Former trustee, Hawaii Pacific University
- Member of the Board of Directors of the Duke Law School Center on Law, Ethics and National Security (LENS) when the center was established in 1993.
- Recipient of the 2001 Castle Award from the West Point Society of Washington, D.C.
- Recipient of the 2017 William Tudor Society Lifetime Achievement Award at West Point.
- Member of the Advisory Committee of Thayer Leadership, a leadership education organization at West Point, New York.

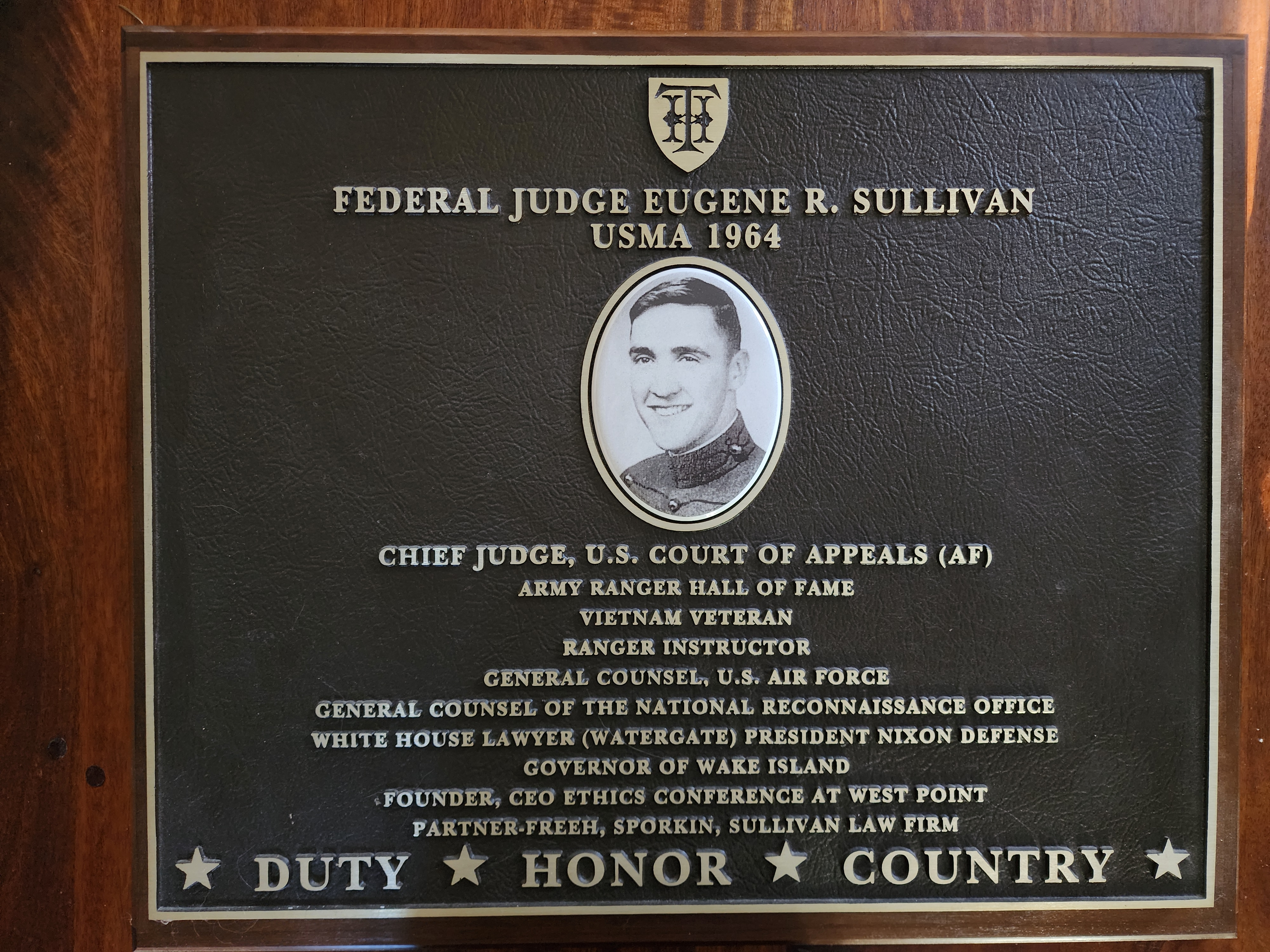
Hotel Thayer, West Point - Room Dedication Plaque

- Room dedicated to Judge Sullivan at the Hotel Thayer on the grounds of the U.S. Military Academy, West Point, New York.
- In 1988 and 1989, Sullivan served on a federal commission reviewing the West Point Cadet Honor Code. Established by Army Chief of Staff General Carl E. Vuono and chaired by University of Pittsburgh president Wesley W. Posvar, the commission examined the administration of the honor system, including procedures for handling alleged violations. Its report, issued in 1989, recommended changes to the administration of the honor system while reaffirming the importance of the honor code. The commission also recommended greater emphasis on ethical decision-making through the study of real-world cases.
- Founder and chair of CEO Day at the annual National Conference on Ethics in America for college student leaders held at West Point. More than 60 colleges and universities send two to four student leaders to live in the West Point barracks and receive ethics and honor training.
- Arlington National Cemetery awarded Judge Sullivan a U.S. Army Certificate of Appreciation for saving the life of a heart attack victim attending a funeral at the cemetery using CPR in 2010.
- The Key to the City of Birmingham, Alabama, was awarded to Judge Sullivan following his speech at the city's Armed Forces Day Parade. Birmingham has hosted the parade since 1947.
- Member of the Board of Directors of the Ellis Island Honors Society.
- In West Point Warriors: Profiles of Duty, Honor, and Country in Battle (Warner Books, 2002), author Tom Carhart profiles Sullivan's years at West Point, his military service in Vietnam, his subsequent work on President Nixon's legal defense team during Watergate, and his later appointment to the federal judiciary.

== Military career – honors and awards ==
- Inducted into the U.S. Army Ranger Hall of Fame in 2010.
- Selected as a Distinguished Member of the Airborne and Ranger Training Brigade in 2006.

Sullivan's military decorations included the Bronze Star Medal and Air Medal, awarded for his service in Vietnam.

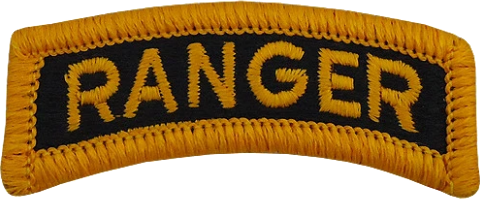
Ranger Tab

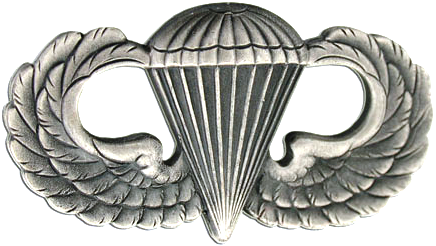
U.S. Parachutist Badge

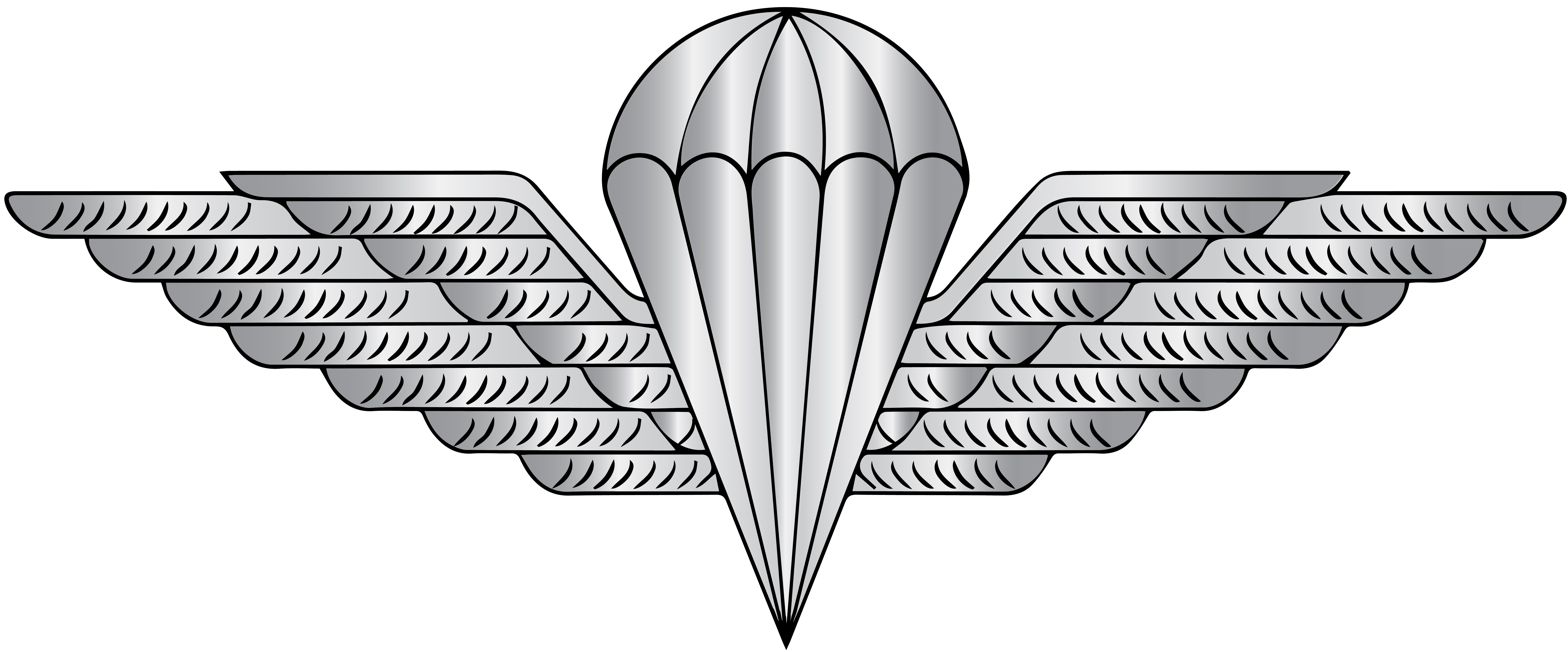
Irish Defence Forces Parachutist Wings (Honorary)

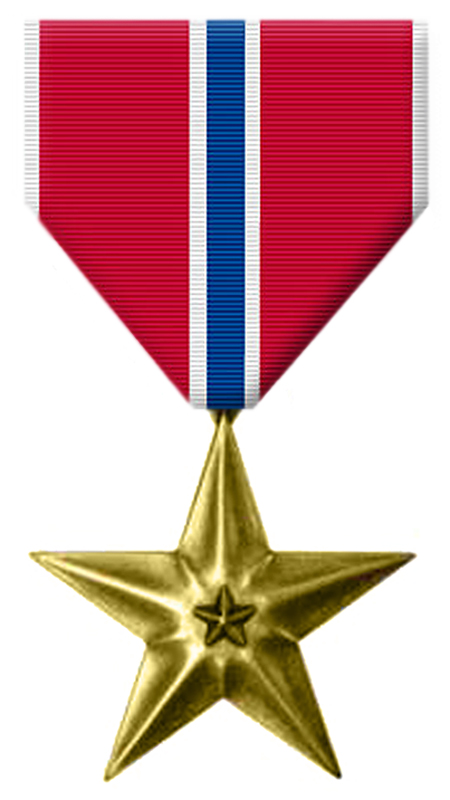
U.S. Bronze Star Medal

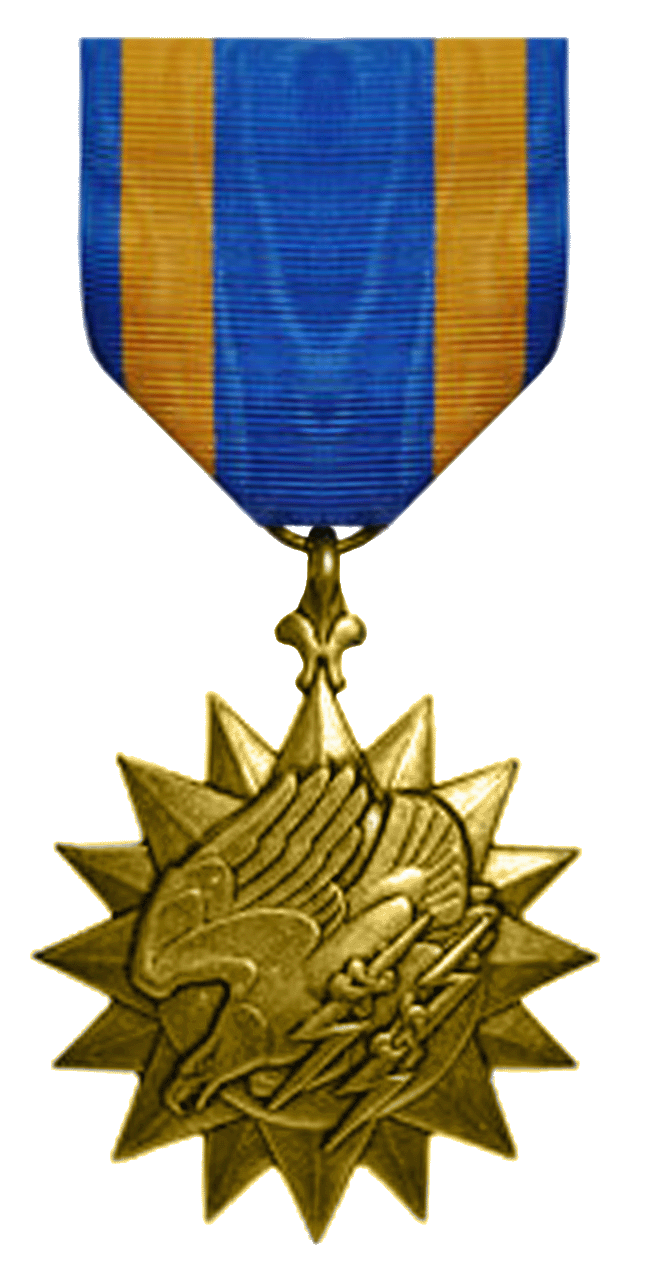
U.S. Air Medal

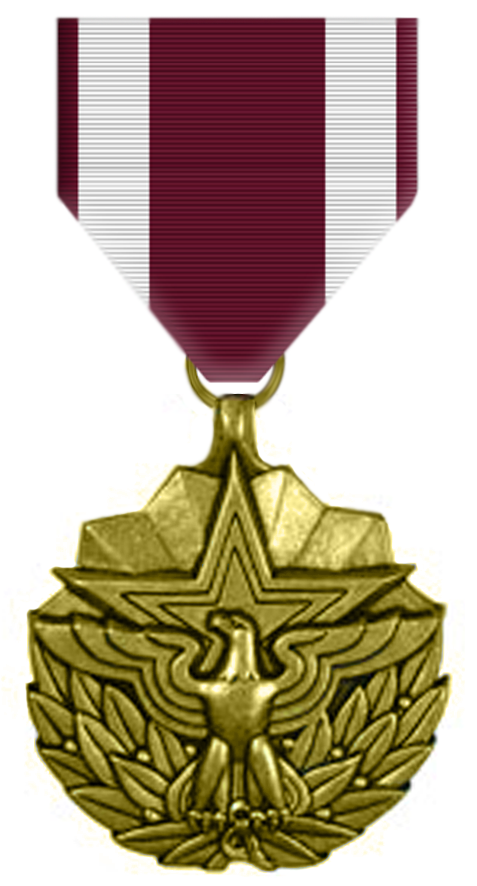
U.S. Meritorious Service Medal

U.S. Army Commendation Medal

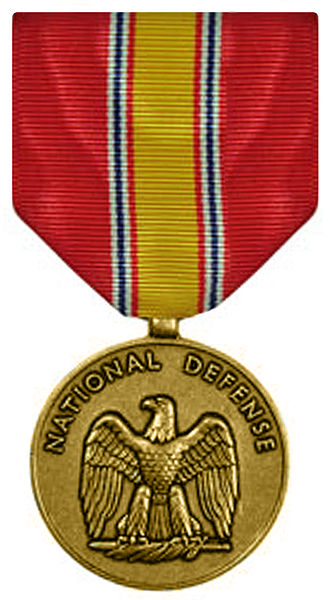
U.S. National Defense Service Medal

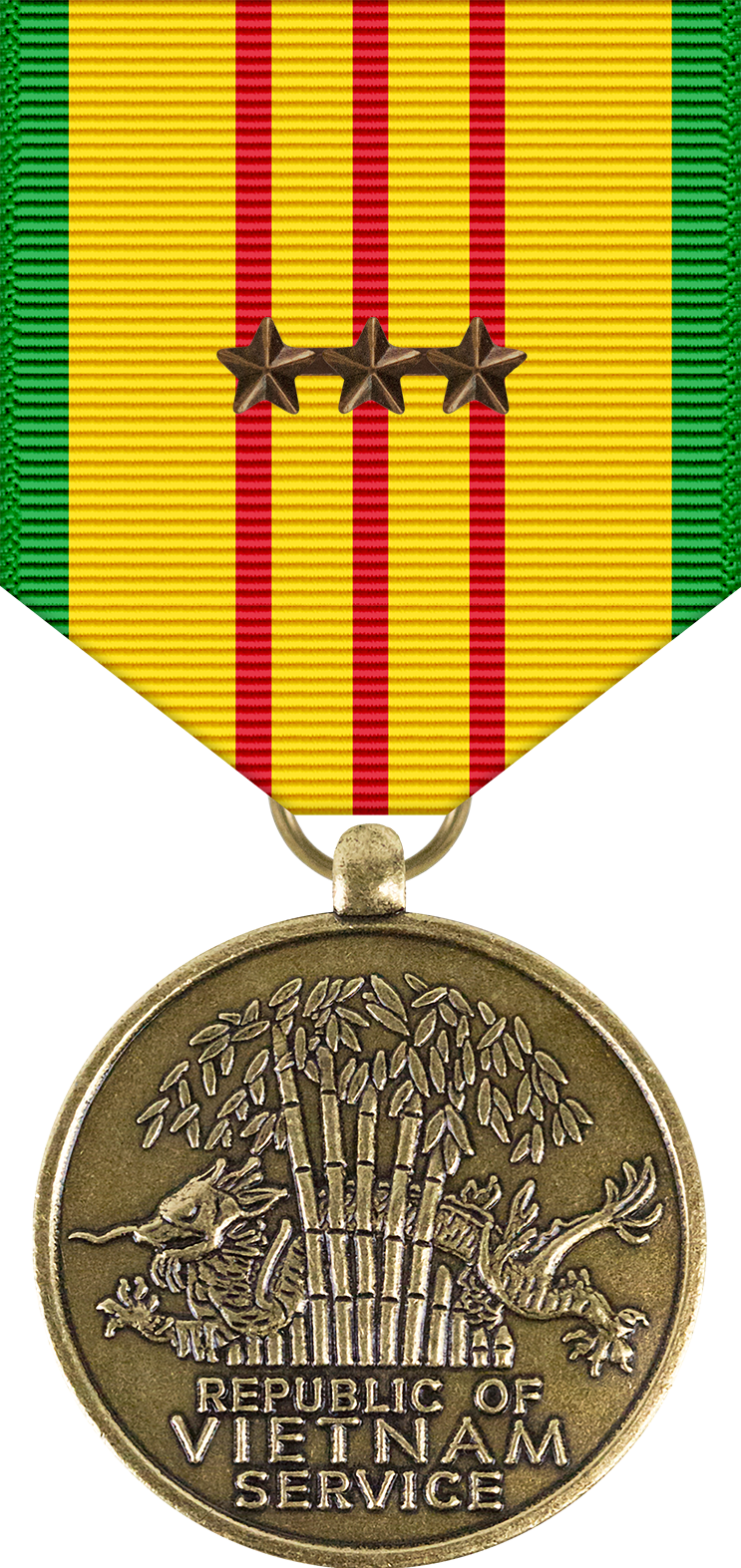
Vietnam Service Medal with 3 Bronze Service Stars

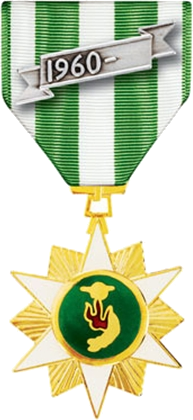
Vietnam Campaign Medal with bar

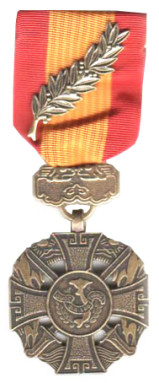
Vietnam Gallantry Cross with Palm (Unit Citation)

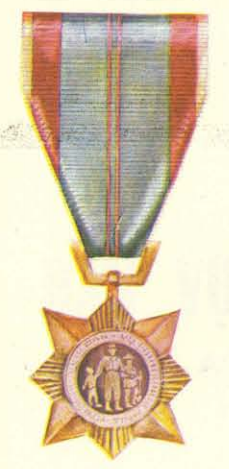
Vietnam Civil Action Medal (First Class) with Palm (Unit Citation)

Air Force Outstanding Unit Award

== Bibliography ==
- The Majority Rules (2005), ISBN 0-7653-1141-0
- The Report to the Judiciary (2008) ISBN 0-7653-1388-X

Legal offices
| Preceded by Albert Fletcher | Judge of the United States Court of Appeals for the Armed Forces; 1986–2002 | Succeeded by Charles E. Erdmann |
| Preceded by Robinson O. Everett | Chief Judge of the United States Court of Appeals for the Armed Forces; 1990–1995 | Succeeded by Walter T. Cox III |
