= Tom Foran =

American lawyer (1924–2000)

United States Attorney for the Northern District of Illinois
- In office 1968–1969
- President: Lyndon B. Johnson
- Preceded by: Edward Hanrahan
- Succeeded by: William J. Bauer

Personal details
- Born: Thomas Aquinas Foran; January 11, 1924 Chicago, Illinois, U.S.
- Died: August 6, 2000 (aged 76) Lake Forest, Illinois, U.S.
- Party: Democratic
- Education: College of the Holy Cross; Loyola University, Chicago (BA); University of Detroit (LLB)

Military service
- Allegiance: United States
- Branch/service: United States Navy
- Battles/wars: World War II

Thomas Aquinas Foran (January 11, 1924 – August 6, 2000) was an American lawyer who served as U.S. attorney for the Northern District of Illinois from 1968 to 1969. He was best known as the chief prosecutor in the Chicago Seven conspiracy trial in which seven defendants—including Jerry Rubin, Abbie Hoffman, David Dellinger, Rennie Davis, and Tom Hayden—were charged with inciting riots at the 1968 Democratic National Convention.

== Early life and education ==
Foran was born in Chicago, Illinois, on January 11, 1924. His parents were a physician and former high school teacher. He attended Quigley Preparatory Seminary and St. Ignatius High School and began studying at the College of the Holy Cross in Worcester, Massachusetts. He interrupted his college education to serve as a torpedo bomber pilot in the Pacific in World War II. After the war, he graduated with a bachelor's degree in philosophy from Loyola University Chicago and received his law degree at the University of Detroit School of Law in 1950. He married Jean Foran and the couple had six children.

== Legal career ==
Foran was a senior partner in Foran & Schultz (formerly Foran, Wiss & Schultz), the firm he founded in 1957. The other senior partners were Robert E. Wiss, who died in 1995, and Richard G. Schultz. In private practice, he established a reputation as an expert in eminent domain law, representing the city of Chicago in major public works projects, but he also acted as counsel for property owners. Foran became an assistant corporate counsel for Chicago in 1962.

=== U.S. Attorney ===
Foran was appointed a United States Attorney for the Northern District of Illinois in 1968 with the support of the Chicago mayor, Richard M. Daley. He professionalized the office and shifted the office away from patronage. While in this role, he successfully prosecuted more than 150 organized crime figures, including Felix Alderisio, Jackie Cerone, Fiore Buccieri, Richard Cain and William Daddano. In 1969, he was the chief prosecutor of the Chicago Seven conspiracy trial which charged seven defendants, including Jerry Rubin, Abbie Hoffman, David Dellinger, Rennie Davis, and Tom Hayden, with inciting riots at the 1968 Democratic National Convention. He was later censured by a United States Court of Appeals for the Seventh Circuit panel "for their open hostility toward the defendants and their failure to fulfill 'the standards of our system of justice'".

=== Post-U.S. Attorney ===
In the 1970 special election, Foran was a campaign aide for Adlai Stevenson III. In the 1980s, Tom Foran represented former Governor Dan Walker in his bank fraud case.

== Later life ==
He died of cancer in Lake Forest, Illinois, on August 6, 2000.

== In popular culture ==
Harris Yulin played Foran in the 1987 film Conspiracy: The Trial of the Chicago 8, and in the animated 2007 film Chicago 10, Foran's voice was provided by Nick Nolte. He was portrayed by Steven Culp in the 2010 film The Chicago 8 and by J. C. MacKenzie in the 2020 film, The Trial of the Chicago 7.

Gary Houston played Foran in the 1992 stage adaptation from transcripts titled The Chicago Conspiracy Trial and produced by Remains Theatre in Chicago.
