= J. C. MacKenzie =

Canadian actor (b. 1970)

J.C. MacKenzie
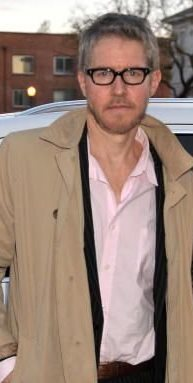
- Born: John Charles MacKenzie; October 17, 1970 (age 55); Peterborough, Ontario, Canada
- Occupation: Actor
- Years active: 1985–present
- Spouse: Erin Cressida Wilson
- Children: 2

John Charles MacKenzie (born October 17, 1970) is a Canadian actor. He is best known for portraying Skip Fontaine on the HBO series Vinyl (2016) and Reagan "Normal" Ronald on the Fox series Dark Angel (2000–2002). He has also appeared in several films directed by Martin Scorsese, including The Departed (2006), The Wolf of Wall Street (2013), and The Irishman (2019).

== Early life ==
John Charles MacKenzie was born in Peterborough, Ontario on October 17, 1970, one of four sons born to nurse Mary and pharmacist Bill MacKenzie. He was raised in Ottawa, Ontario, and attended Pinecrest Public School and Sir John A. Macdonald High School. He later studied at Concordia University and the London Academy of Music and Dramatic Art (LAMDA).

== Career ==
MacKenzie spent several years working in theatre across Canada until he was picked by Neil Simon to do the national tour of Simon's play Biloxi Blues, which ran for over 600 performances over the course of a year and a half. His first television success came as Arnold Spivak in the Emmy Award-winning television series Murder One, which ran for two seasons on ABC. He was cast as Reagan "Normal" Ronald in the series Dark Angel, which won a People's Choice Award and ran for two seasons on Fox. Some of his more recent notable roles include Fred Allen on October Faction, Dr. Arnold Spivak on Hemlock Grove, and Skip Fontaine on Vinyl. He has made over 150 television appearances and has appeared in the Martin Scorsese films The Aviator, The Departed, The Wolf of Wall Street, The Irishman, and Killers of the Flower Moon.

== Personal life ==
MacKenzie is married to American screenwriter Erin Cressida Wilson. They have one son together, Liam, and split their time between Los Angeles and New York City.

== Filmography ==
=== Film ===
Year	Title	Role	Notes
1991	Dutch	Mike Malloy	
1994	Rave Review	John	Uncredited
1995	Clockers	Medic Frank	
1995	Heavy	Gas Man	
1998	He Got Game	Dr. Cone	
2000	What Planet Are You From?	John	
2001	Final	Todd	
2004	The Assassination of Richard Nixon	Co-Pilot	
2004	The Aviator	Ludlow	
2006	The Return	Griff	
2006	The Departed	Realtor	
2008	The Day the Earth Stood Still	Grossman	
2008	Mad Money	Mandelbrot	
2009	My One and Only	Tom	
2012	For the Love of Money	Mr. Phillips	
2012	Commencement	Paul Wesker	
2012	That Guy... Who Was in That Thing	Himself	Documentary film
2013	The Wolf of Wall Street	Lucas Solomon	
2017	Molly's Game	Harrison Wellstone	
2019	Share	Mickey Lundy	
2019	The Irishman	James F. Neal	
2020	The Hunt	Paul	
2020	Target Number One	Arthur	
2020	The Trial of the Chicago 7	Tom Foran	
2022	Somewhere in Queens	Mr. Mack	
2023	Killers of the Flower Moon	Radio Announcer	
2023	American Fiction	Carl Brunt	

Key
†	Denotes films that have not yet been released

=== Television ===
Year	Title	Role	Notes
1985	Seeing Things	Peter Deacon-Davies	
1985	Perry Mason Returns	Gas Station Attendant	TV movie
1988	Alfred Hitchcock Presents	Rick Hayden	
1989	Tattingers	Stockbroker	
1989	Have Faith	Father Nicky Doran	
1990	Baywatch	Marty	
1990	Babes	Greg	
1991	In the Heat of the Night	Detective Sgt. Mara	
1991	Deadly Medicine	Dr. Jim Vale	TV movie
1992	Sibs	Chris	
1994	Law & Order	M. E. Hoeck	
1995	CBS Schoolbreak Special	Al Rossi	
1995–1997	Murder One	Arnold Spivak	
1996	Poltergeist: The Legacy	Stan Davace	
1996	F/X: The Series	Wayne Harmon	
1998	Touched by an Angel	Ray Craig	
1998	The Pentagon Wars	Jones	TV movie
1998	New York Undercover	Holmquist	
1998	The Practice	Dr. Fred Spivak	
1999	L.A. Doctors	Attorney Ray	
1999	Total Recall 2070	Brendan McGuire	
1999	Happy Face Murders	Ed Baker	TV movie
1999	Earth: Final Conflict	Dr. Michael Reed	
2000	Perfect Murder, Perfect Town	Trip Demuth	
2000–2002	Dark Angel	Reagan "Normal" Ronald	
2002	Monk	Sidney Teal	
2002	MDs	Ted	
2003	The Agency	Peter Walton	
2003–2009	CSI: Miami	Mr. Infante / Timothy Hewitt	2 episodes
2004	JAG	Sean Parker	
2004	Law & Order: Criminal Intent	Lenny	
2004–2008	The Shield	Detective Kouf	
2005–2023	Law & Order: Special Victims Unit	Brian Ackerman / Counselor Richard Pace	5 episodes
2006	Gospel of Deceit	Ted Wendell	TV movie
2006	CSI: Crime Scene Investigation	Dr. Gus Hoffman	
2006	Standoff	William Tate	
2006	Enemies	Keith Abbott	
2007	NCIS	Mitchell Reese	
2007	24	Doctor Bradley	
2008	Desperate Housewives	Walter Bierlich	
2009	Without a Trace	Rick Stevens	
2009	Ghost Whisperer	Jeffrey Silber	
2009	In Plain Sight	Mr. Day	
2009	Medium	Dan Taper	
2009	Dexter	Andy Brightman	
2010	The Mentalist	Griffin Welks	
2010	Gigantic	Gary Ritter	
2011	Big Love	Superintendent Buckland	
2011	Burn Notice	Hector Oaks	
2013	House of Cards	Phil Langdon	
2013	Elementary	Daren Sutter	
2014–2015	Hemlock Grove	Dr. Arnold Spivak	
2015	The Good Wife	Interviewer	
2016	Vinyl	Skip Fontaine	
2016	The OA	Dr. Mark Shea	
2016–2017	Madam Secretary	Gov. Sam Evans	
2018	Instinct	Frank Fallon	
2019	Bull	Judge McPherson	
2020	FBI: Most Wanted	Judge Edward Philpot	
2020	October Faction	Fred Allen	
2020	Billions	Head	
2022	The Girl from Plainville	Judge Moniz	
2022	Gaslit	E. Howard Hunt	
2023	The Blacklist	Mr. Kavanaugh	
