= Susan J. Crawford =

American judge (born 1947)

Susan Crawford
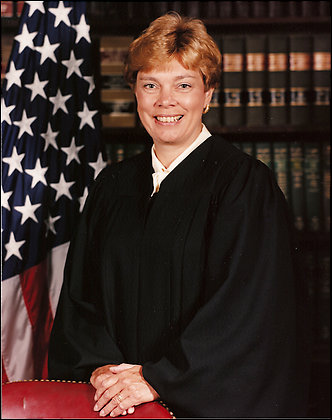

Convening Authority of the Guantanamo Military Commissions
- In office February 7, 2007 – January 2010
- Appointed by: George W. Bush
- Preceded by: John D. Altenburg
- Succeeded by: Bruce MacDonald

Senior Judge of the United States Court of Appeals for the Armed Forces
- Incumbent
- Assumed office September 30, 2006

Chief Judge of the United States Court of Appeals for the Armed Forces
- In office October 1, 1999 – October 1, 2004
- Preceded by: Walter T. Cox III
- Succeeded by: H. F. Gierke III

Judge of the United States Court of Appeals for the Armed Forces
- In office November 19, 1991 – September 30, 2006
- Appointed by: George H. W. Bush
- Preceded by: Robinson O. Everett
- Succeeded by: Scott W. Stucky

Inspector General of the Department of Defense
- In office November 28, 1989 – November 19, 1991
- President: George H. W. Bush
- Preceded by: Derek Vander Schaaf (acting)
- Succeeded by: Derek Vander Schaaf (acting)

Personal details
- Born: April 22, 1947 (age 79) Pittsburgh, Pennsylvania, U.S.
- Spouse: Roger Higgins
- Children: 1 daughter
- Education: Bucknell University (BA); New England School of Law (JD)

Susan Jean Crawford (born April 22, 1947) is an American lawyer, who was appointed the Convening Authority for the Guantanamo military commissions, on February 7, 2007. Secretary of Defense Robert Gates appointed Crawford to replace John D. Altenburg.

She had previously served as judge and chief judge of the United States Court of Appeals for the Armed Forces, Inspector General of the Department of Defense (appointed by George H. W. Bush), General Counsel for the Department of the Army (appointed by Ronald Reagan) and Assistant State's Attorney for Garrett County, Maryland.

== Education ==
- Diploma, Mt. Lebanon High School, June 1965
- Bachelor of Arts, History, Bucknell University, June 1969
- J.D., New England School of Law, June 1977

== Judge on Court of Appeals for the Armed Forces ==
Crawford was an active judge on the Court of Appeals for the Armed Forces (CAAF) from 1991 to 2006. She was appointed by President George H. W. Bush as a justice to the nation's highest military court in 1991 for a fifteen-year term. She served as its chief judge from 1999 to 2004. She is now a judge in senior status.

Crawford was the lone dissenter in a case involving Senator-Military Judge-Colonel Lindsey O. Graham. In 2006, by a vote of 4–1, the CAAF found unconstitutional the dual role of Lindsey O. Graham as a senator (Republican from South Carolina) and as a reserve officer sitting as a military judge on the Air Force Court of Criminal Appeals. Crawford, in dissent, contended that there was no constitutional error in Senator Graham's role, and that, even if there were, it was harmless. In the case in point, the military appellant Airman Lane had been unable to show he suffered any "actual prejudice." She also said that, if Congress thought there were a constitutional problem in Sen. Graham's service, it would have been free to take action, and it has not.

The majority's opinion relied upon the Constitution's "incompatibility clause" in Article I, " saying that "no person holding any office under the United States shall be a member of either House during his continuance in service." It also relied upon separation-of-power principles, primarily as discussed by the Supreme Court in Buckley v. Valeo (1976) and three Supreme Court precedents from the 1990s dealing with appointments to military courts. Congress, Crawford wrote, "may well desire the synergism that would result from having a member of Congress serving as a trial or appellate judge in the military justice system."

== Negotiated Hicks' plea bargain ==
Crawford is reported to have directly negotiated the plea bargain of David Hicks, an Australian linked with Al Qaeda and the Taliban, without any input from the Prosecution.

== Guantanamo discussion ==
When speaking at Bucknell University on April 27, 2007, Crawford said:

"Much of the media coverage and commentary has been negative, questioning our legal authority to hold detainees without a trial in U.S. Federal Courts," Crawford said. "Under the law of war, the detainees at Guantanamo Bay are not held pending criminal charges. While detainees may be tried for violations of the law of war, there is no obligation to so charge them."

During the same presentation, Crawford said:

"One of the biggest problems at Guantanamo is that the detainees gain too much weight because we feed them so well." In response to a question as to whether she endorses the practice of extraordinary rendition and the CIA's kidnapping of foreign citizens in other countries, Crawford said: "Well, I don't think we always have the right to kidnap foreign citizens."

On October 10, 2007, Morris D. Davis, the Chief Prosecutor for Office of Military Commissions at Guantanamo Bay, Cuba, resigned in protest, concluding that:

... full, fair and open trials were not possible under the current system. I resigned on that day because I felt that the system had become deeply politicized and that I could no longer do my job effectively or responsibly.

Davis criticized Susan Crawford as a cause of the problems in the Military Commissions process, through her mixing of convening authority and prosecutor roles and her use of closed-door hearings, which he considered unnecessary. Morris called for removal of the political appointees: Susan Crawford and William J. Haynes, and return of control to uniformed career military authorities in order to restore openness and fairness to the Military Commissions process.

On August 9, 2008, William Glaberson wrote in The New York Times about Crawford's role in the recent Hamdan conviction:

There were unknowns. A Pentagon official, Susan J. Crawford, has broad power over the entire tribunal process, including naming the military officers eligible to hear the case. Her title, convening authority, has no civilian equivalent. Her decisions to grant or deny financing for items like the defense's expert witness fees or defense lawyers' transportation were not explained during the trial. She has never granted an interview to a reporter.

In an interview with Bob Woodward published in The Washington Post on January 14, 2009, Crawford responded to questions about why she had not referred the case of Mohammed al Qahtani, the so-called "20th hijacker" of the September 11th attacks, to trial:

We tortured Qahtani. His treatment met the legal definition of torture. And that's why I did not refer the case [for prosecution] .... The techniques they used were all authorized, but the manner in which they applied them was overly aggressive and too persistent. . . . You think of torture, you think of some horrendous physical act done to an individual. This was not any one particular act; this was just a combination of things that had a medical impact on him, that hurt his health. It was abusive and uncalled for. And coercive. Clearly coercive. It was that medical impact that pushed me over the edge [to call it torture].

== Denied travel funds to Mohamed Jawad's military attorneys ==
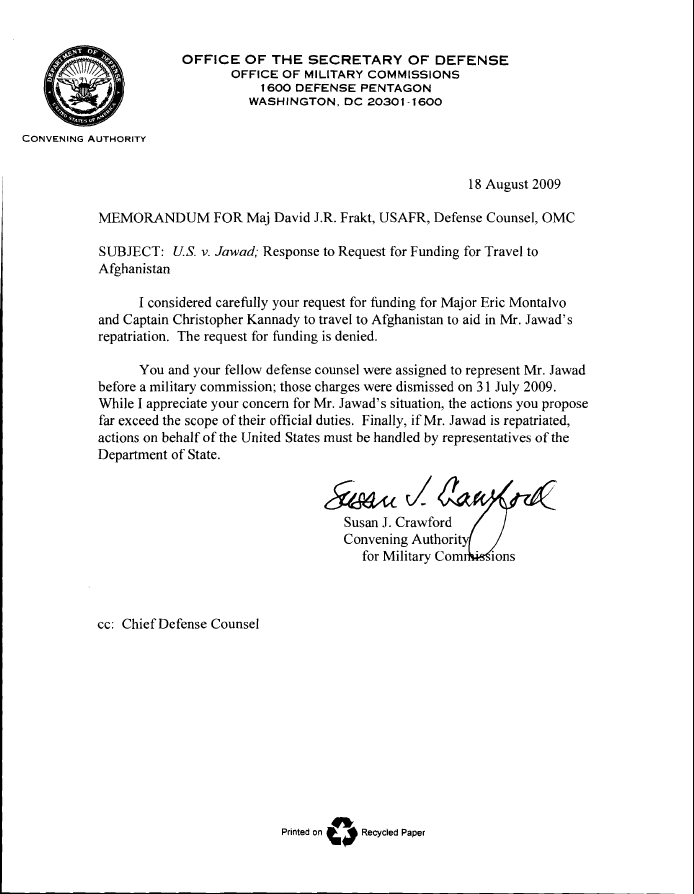
Susan Crawford denies travel funds.

Mohamed Jawad was a detainee whose case was referred to the civilian court system, which dropped the charges against him and recommended that he be repatriated. His military attorneys requested funds to travel to Afghanistan to help aid in his repatriation. Crawford declined to fund their travel, since charges against him had been dropped. Eric Montalvo chose to travel to Afghanistan at his own expense to aid Jawad.

== Replacement ==
Crawford retired in January 2010. In March 2010, retired Admiral Bruce MacDonald, a career Navy officer, was named as the convening authority for military commissions.

Legal offices
Preceded by Delbert Spurlock	General Counsel of the Army; 1983–1989	Succeeded by William J. Haynes, II
Preceded by Robinson O. Everett	Judge of the United States Court of Appeals for the Armed Forces; 1991–2006	Succeeded by Scott W. Stucky
Preceded by Walter Cox	Chief Judge of the United States Court of Appeals for the Armed Forces; 1999–2004	Succeeded by Sparky Gierke
Preceded by John Altenburg	Convening Authority of the Guantanamo Military Commissions; 2007–2010	Succeeded by Bruce MacDonald
Government offices
Preceded by Derek Vander Schaaf; Acting	Inspector General of the Department of Defense; 1989–1991	Succeeded by Derek Vander Schaaf; Acting
