= United States Court of Appeals for the Armed Forces =

Federal tribunal for appeal of lower military courts

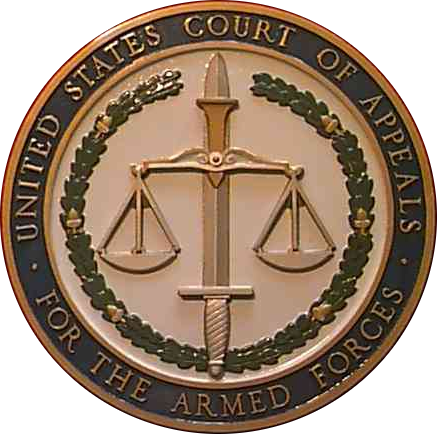
- Location: U.S. Court of Military Appeals Building (Washington, D.C. 38.8958°N 77.0183°W)
- Appeals to: Supreme Court of the United States
- Appeals from: Service Courts of Criminal Appeals: Air Force; Army; Coast Guard; Navy-Marine Corps
- Established: 1951
- Authority: Article I tribunal
- Created by: 10 U.S.C. §§ 941–946 (U.C.M.J. Subchapter XII, Art. 141–146)
- Composition method: Presidential nomination with Senate advice and consent
- Judges: 5
- Judge term length: 15 years
- Chief Judge: Gregory E. Maggs
- armfor.uscourts.gov

The United States Court of Appeals for the Armed Forces (in case citations, C.A.A.F. or USCAAF) is an Article I court that exercises worldwide appellate jurisdiction over members of the United States Armed Forces on active duty and other persons subject to the Uniform Code of Military Justice. The court is composed of five civilian judges appointed for 15-year terms by the president of the United States with the advice and consent of the United States Senate. The court reviews decisions from the intermediate appellate courts of the services: the Army Court of Criminal Appeals, the Navy-Marine Corps Court of Criminal Appeals, the Coast Guard Court of Criminal Appeals, and the Air Force Court of Criminal Appeals.

== History ==
Courts-martial are judicial proceedings conducted by the armed forces. The Continental Congress first authorized the use of courts-martial in 1775. From the time of the American Revolutionary War through the middle of the twentieth century, courts-martial were governed by the Articles of War and the Articles for the Government of the Navy. Congress's authority "To make Rules for the Government and Regulation of the land and naval Forces" is contained in the United States Constitution at Article I, Section 8.

Until 1920, court-martial convictions were reviewed either by a commander in the field or by the president, depending on the severity of the sentence or the rank of the accused. The absence of formal review received critical attention during World War I, and the Army created an internal legal review process for a limited number of cases. Following the war, in the Act of June 4, 1920, Congress required the Army to establish boards of review, consisting of three lawyers, to consider cases involving death, dismissal of an officer, an unsuspended dishonorable discharge, or confinement in a penitentiary, with limited exceptions. The legislation further required legal review of other cases in the Office of the Judge Advocate General.

The military justice system under the Articles of War and Articles for the Government of the Navy received significant attention during World War II and its immediate aftermath. During the war, in which over 16 million persons served in the American armed forces, the military services held over 1.7 million courts-martial. A number of these proceedings were conducted without lawyers acting as presiding officers or counsel. Studies conducted by the military departments and the civilian bar identified a variety of problems in the administration of military justice during the war, including the potential for improper command influence.

In 1948, Congress enacted significant reforms to the Articles of War, including creation of a Judicial Council of three general officers to consider cases involving sentences of death, life imprisonment, or dismissal of an officer, as well as cases referred to the Council by a board of review or the judge advocate general. During the same period, Congress placed the departments of the Army, Navy, and Air Force under the newly created Department of Defense. The first Secretary of Defense, James Forrestal, created a committee under the chairmanship of Professor Edmund Morgan to study the potential for unifying and revising the services' disparate military justice systems under a single code.

The committee recommended a unified system applicable to the Army, Navy, Air Force, Marine Corps, and Coast Guard. The committee also recommended that qualified attorneys serve as presiding officers and counsel, subject to limited exceptions. Multiple other changes were proposed by the committee to enhance the rights of servicemen in the context of the disciplinary needs of the armed forces. The recommendations included creation of an independent civilian appellate court.

The committee's recommendations, as revised by Congress, became the Uniform Code of Military Justice (UCMJ), enacted on May 5, 1950. Its name was changed from council to Court in the House, out of fear that council sounded too much like city council. Article 67 of the UCMJ established the Court of Military Appeals as a three-judge civilian court. The report of the House Armed Services Committee accompanying the legislation emphasized that the new court would be "completely removed from all military influence of persuasion." The legislation became effective on May 31, 1951. In 1968, Congress redesignated the court as the United States Court of Military Appeals.

In 1989, Congress enacted comprehensive legislation to enhance the effectiveness and stability of the court. The legislation increased the court's membership to five judges, consistent with the American Bar Association's Standards for Court Organization. In 1994, Congress gave the court its current designation, the United States Court of Appeals for the Armed Forces.

== Jurisdiction and appellate review of courts-martial ==
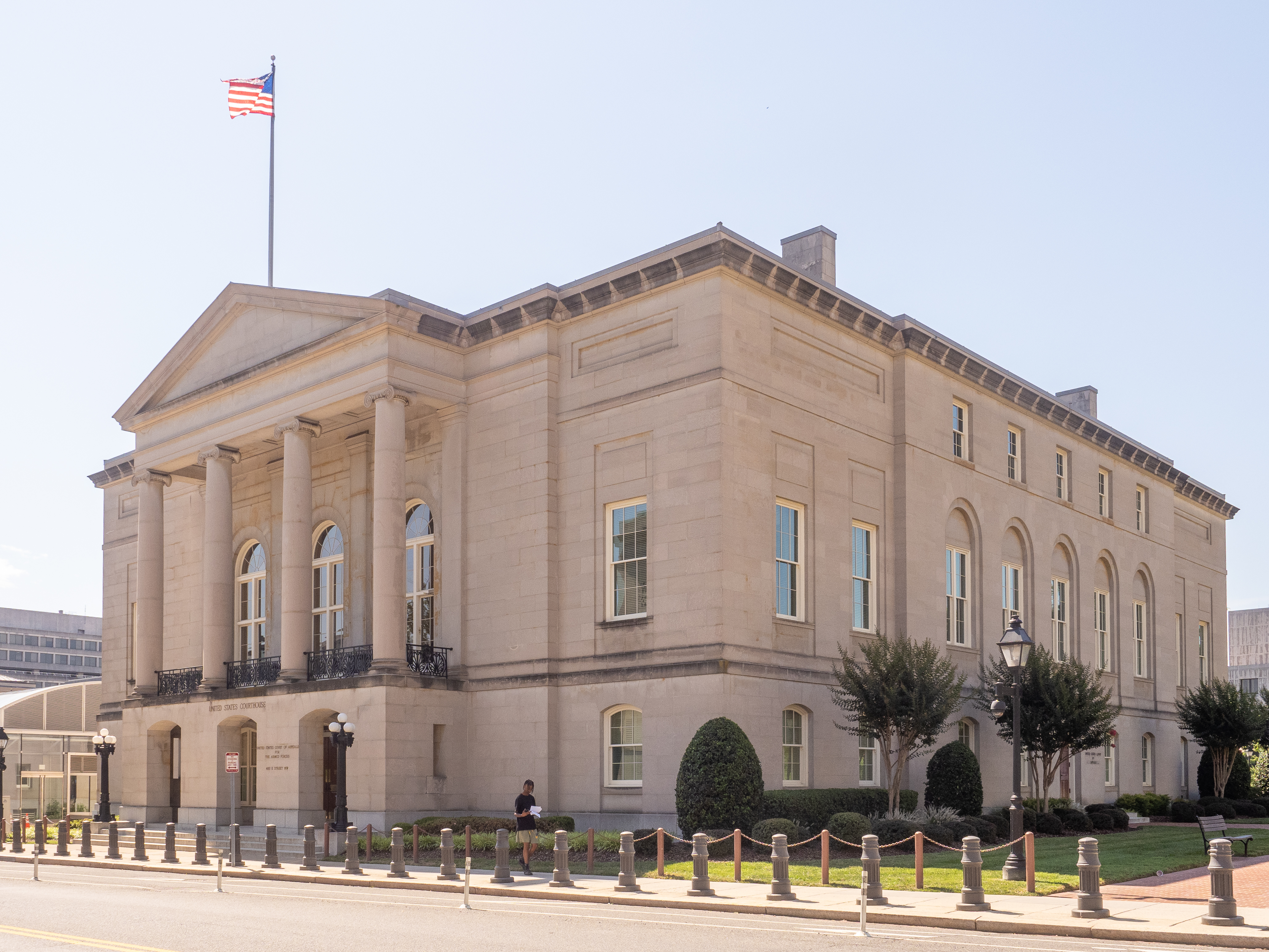
Courthouse for the Court of Appeals in Washington, D.C.

Courts-martial are conducted under the UCMJ (10 U.S.C. §§ 801–946, U.C.M.J. art. 1–146) and the Manual for Courts-Martial. If the trial results in a conviction, the case is then reviewed by the convening authority – the person who referred the case for trial by court-martial. The convening authority may approve the conviction of the court-martial, but also has the discretion to mitigate the findings and sentence.

Beyond the review by the convening authority, court-martial cases may be appealed to two additional levels of judicial review. These are the Courts of Criminal Appeals and the Court of Appeals for the Armed Forces.

=== Intermediate review – Courts of Criminal Appeals ===
If the sentence, as approved by the convening authority, includes death, a bad-conduct discharge, a dishonorable discharge, dismissal of an officer, or confinement for one year or more, the case is reviewed by an intermediate court. There are four such courts—the Army Court of Criminal Appeals, the Navy-Marine Corps Court of Criminal Appeals, the Air Force Court of Criminal Appeals, and the Coast Guard Court of Criminal Appeals. The Courts of Criminal Appeals review the cases for legal error, factual sufficiency, and sentence appropriateness. All other cases are subject to review by judge advocates under regulations issued by each service. After such review, the Judge Advocate General may refer a case to the appropriate Court of Criminal Appeals. The Courts of Criminal Appeals also have jurisdiction under Article 62 of the UCMJ to consider appeals by the United States of certain judicial rulings during trial. Review under Article 62 is limited to issues involving alleged legal errors.

=== Final review – Court of Appeals for the Armed Forces ===
The Court's primary jurisdictional statute is Article 67(a) of the UCMJ, which provides:

The Court of Appeals for the Armed Forces shall review the record in: 1) all cases in which the sentence, as affirmed by a Court of Criminal Appeals, extends to death; 2) all cases reviewed by a Court of Criminal Appeals which the Judge Advocate General orders sent to the Court of Appeals for the Armed Forces for review; and 3) all cases reviewed by a Court of Criminal Appeals in which, upon petition of the accused and on good cause shown, the Court of Appeals for the Armed Forces has granted a review.

Under Article 67(c), the Court's review is limited to issues of law. The Courts of Criminal Appeals and the U.S. Court of Appeals for the Armed Forces also have jurisdiction to consider petitions for extraordinary relief under the All Writs Act (28 U.S.C. § 1651).

Cases on the court's docket address a broad range of legal issues, including constitutional law, criminal law, evidence, criminal procedure, ethics, administrative law, and national security law. The cases before the court may only be reviewed upon a granted petition for review (which occurs in 10 percent of cases), by certificate from an individual service Judge Advocate General, a sentence of death, a petition for extraordinary relief or a writ appeal petition. Statistics show that the court reviews approximately 10 percent of all court-martial convictions. In the year ending September 1, 2009, the court had 1,002 cumulative filings and disposed of 1,033 cases. Of these 1,033 cases, 46 were disposed of by signed or per curiam opinions and 987 were by memorandum or order. (By comparison, the US Supreme Court issued 92 signed opinions in 2009.)

=== Supreme Court review ===
The Supreme Court of the United States has discretion under 28 U.S.C. § 1259 to review cases under the UCMJ on writ of certiorari where the CAAF has conducted a mandatory review (death penalty and certified cases), granted or refused discretionary review of a petition, or otherwise granted or refused relief.

Until 2023, if the CAAF denied a petition for review or a writ appeal, consideration by the Supreme Court could be obtained only through collateral review (e.g., a writ of habeas corpus). Beginning in 2007, several bills were introduced into Congress to expand the accessibility of the Supreme Court to service members. The law was eventually changed as part of the National Defense Authorization Act for Fiscal Year 2024. However, the Supreme Court still lacks administrative authority over the CAAF, including over contempt of court and attorney discipline cases. Advocates continue to argue for an expansion of the Supreme Court's jurisdiction to hear these matters.

== Case citation ==
Bluebook citation form for the CAAF is provided in Table T.1 (C.A.A.F.), previously United States Court of Military Appeals (C.M.A.), of The Bluebook: A Uniform System of Citation (Columbia Law Review Ass'n et al. eds, 18th ed. 2005). The official reporters are Decisions of the United States Court of Military Appeals (C.M.A.) (1951–75), Court Martial Reports (C.M.R.) (1951–75) and West's Military Justice Reporter (M.J.) (1975–present).

== Location ==
Since October 31, 1952, the Court has been located in Judiciary Square in Washington, D.C. The United States Court of Military Appeals, listed on the National Register of Historic Places, was erected in 1910, and was formerly the home of the United States Court of Appeals for the District of Columbia Circuit. The building was designed by Elliott Woods.

== Judges ==
The court has five judges, who are nominated by the president of the United States and confirmed by the United States Senate. Judges serve fifteen-year terms. After their term, they must be either re-appointed or retire from the court. When hearing a case, all five judges sit as a panel.

Article 142 of the Uniform Code of Military Justice provides that not more than three judges may be appointed to the court from the same political party, which is a common provision for Article I courts and administrative agencies, but is unlike Article III federal courts. To underscore the civilian nature of the Court, the statute provides that a person may not be appointed as a judge of the Court within seven years after retirement from active duty as a commissioned officer of a regular component of an armed force.

The judges regularly meet in conference to discuss recently argued cases. As a matter of custom, there is full discussion of each case followed by a tentative vote. If the chief judge is in the majority, the chief judge assigns the responsibility for drafting an opinion to a judge in the majority. If the chief judge is not in the majority, the most senior judge in the majority assigns the case. After an opinion is drafted, it is circulated to all judges, who have the opportunity to concur, comment, or submit a separate opinion. After the judges have had an opportunity to express their views in writing, the opinion is released to the parties and the public.

=== Current composition of the court ===
As of January 3, 2023:

#	Title	Judge	Duty station	Born	Term of service			Appointed by
#	Title	Judge	Duty station	Born	Active	Chief	Senior	Appointed by
24	Chief Judge	Gregory E. Maggs	Federal (DC)	1964	2018–present	2026–present	—	Trump
22	Judge	Kevin A. Ohlson	Federal (DC)	1960	2013–present	2021–2026	—	Obama
23	Judge	John E. Sparks	Federal (DC)	1953	2016–present	—	—	Obama
25	Judge	Liam P. Hardy	Federal (DC)	1973	2020–present	—	—	Trump
26	Judge	M. Tia Johnson	Federal (DC)	1959	2023–present	—	—	Biden
12	Senior Judge	Walter T. Cox III	—	1942	1984–2000	1995–1999	2000–present	Reagan
13	Senior Judge	Eugene R. Sullivan	—	1941	1986–2002	1990–1995	2002–present	Reagan
14	Senior Judge	Susan J. Crawford	—	1947	1991–2006	1999–2004	2006–present	G.H.W. Bush
17	Senior Judge	Andrew S. Effron	—	1948	1996–2011	2006–2011	2011–present	Clinton
18	Senior Judge	James E. Baker	—	1960	2000–2015	2011–2015	2015–present	Clinton
19	Senior Judge	Charles E. Erdmann	—	1946	2002–2017	2015–2017	2017–present	G.W. Bush
20	Senior Judge	Scott W. Stucky	—	1948	2006–2021	2017–2021	2021–present	G.W. Bush
21	Senior Judge	Margaret A. Ryan	—	1964	2006–2020	—	2020–present	G.W. Bush

=== List of former judges ===
#	Judge	State	Born–died	Active service	Chief Judge	Senior status	Appointed by	Reason for termination
1	Robert E. Quinn	RI	1894–1975	1951–1975	1951–1971	—	Truman	death
2	George W. Latimer	UT	1901–1990	1951–1961	—	—	Truman	term expired
3	Paul William Brosman	FL	1899–1955	1951–1955	—	—	Truman	death
4	Homer S. Ferguson	MI	1889–1982	1957–1971	—	1971–1976	Eisenhower	retirement
5	Paul J. Kilday	TX	1900–1968	1961–1968	—	—	Kennedy	death
6	William H. Darden	GA	1923–2016	1968–1973	1971–1973	1973–2016	L. Johnson	death
7	Robert Morton Duncan	OH	1927–2012	1971–1974	1973–1974	—	Nixon	appointment to S.D. Ohio
8	William Holmes Cook	IL	1920–1999	1974–1984	—	—	Ford	resignation
9	Albert B. Fletcher Jr.	KS	1925–1998	1975–1985	1975–1980	—	Ford	retirement
10	Matthew J. Perry Jr.	SC	1921–2011	1976–1979	—	—	Ford	appointment to D.S.C.
11	Robinson O. Everett	NC	1928–2009	1980–1992	1980–1990	1992–2009	Carter	death
15	H. F. Gierke III	ND	1943–2016	1991–2006	2004–2006	2006–2016	G.H.W. Bush	death
16	Robert E. Wiss	IL	1929–1995	1992–1995	—	—	G.H.W. Bush	death

=== Chief judges ===
Chief Judge
Quinn	1951–1971
Darden	1971–1973
Duncan	1973–1974
Fletcher, Jr.	1975–1980
Everett	1980–1990
Sullivan	1990–1995
Cox III	1995–1999
Crawford	1999–2004
Gierke III	2004–2006
Effron	2006–2011
Baker	2011–2015
Erdmann	2015–2017
Stucky	2017–2021
Ohlson	2021–2026
Maggs	2026–present

The position of chief judge is rotated among the judges to the most senior judge who has not previously served as chief judge. The chief judge serves in that position for five years unless his or her term as a judge expires sooner. Prior to 1992, the chief judge was designated by the president from among the sitting judges.

=== Senior Judges ===
Judges retiring from the court at the end of their term are eligible to serve as senior judges, who may be called upon to serve on the court in instances of a vacancy, recusal, or other inability of a current judge to serve.

=== Succession of seats ===
Seat 1
Quinn	RI	1951–1975
Perry, Jr.	SC	1976–1979
Everett	NC	1980–1992
Crawford	MD	1991–2006
Stucky	MD	2006–2021
Johnson	VA	2023–present

Seat 2
Latimer	UT	1951–1961
Kilday	TX	1961–1968
Darden	GA	1968–1973
Cook	IL	1974–1984
Cox III	SC	1984–2000
Baker	VA	2000–2015
Sparks	VA	2016–present

Seat 3
Brosman	FL	1951–1955
Ferguson	MI	1957–1971
Duncan	OH	1971–1974
Fletcher, Jr.	KS	1975–1985
Sullivan	MO	1986–2002
Erdmann	MT	2002–2017
Maggs	VA	2018–present

Seat 4
Gierke III	ND	1991–2006
Ryan	VA	2006–2020
Hardy	VA	2020–present

Seat 5
Wiss	IL	1992–1995
Effron	VA	1996–2011
Ohlson	VA	2013–present

== Counsel in cases before the court ==
Each service Judge Advocate General has established separate appellate divisions to represent the government and the defense before the service Courts of Criminal Appeals, the U.S. Court of Appeals for the Armed Forces, and the Supreme Court of the United States regardless of indigency. A servicemember whose case is eligible for review is entitled to free representation by government-furnished counsel, and also may be represented by civilian counsel provided at the servicemember's own expense.

When the court grants review, and in cases involving mandatory review, the parties are notified of the briefing requirements under the court's rules. In most cases, oral argument is scheduled following submission of briefs, but the court decides a number of cases without oral argument. The court notifies the parties and counsel of the oral argument date, and the oral argument schedule is posted on the court's website. In a typical case, each counsel is given 30 minutes to present argument, on behalf of their client, to the court. Unlike most civilian criminal jurisdictions in the United States, the military does not require that a defendant prove an inability to pay in order to receive defense counsel at government expense.

Counsel appearing before the court must be admitted to the Bar of the Court or obtain permission of the court to appear in a specific case. An application for membership in the court's bar may be obtained from the Court's website, www.armfor.uscourts.gov, or by writing to the Clerk of the Court. Over 33,000 attorneys have been admitted to practice since the Court was established in 1951.

== Project Outreach and Judge Everett's public role ==
Most of the court's oral arguments are held at its courthouse in Washington, D.C. On occasion, as part of the court's judicial outreach program, the Court will hold arguments at law schools, military bases, and other public facilities. This practice, known as Project Outreach, was developed principally by Chief Judge Robinson O. Everett as part of a public awareness program to demonstrate the operation of a federal court of appeals and the military criminal justice system. Everett presided over an expansion of the Court's public-facing role during his association with the Court, including taking live telephone phone calls from C-SPAN viewers on a July 14, 1989, television program.

== See also ==
- Court Martial Appeal Court of Canada
- Summary Appeal Court
