= M. Tia Johnson =

American judge and academic

Tia Johnson
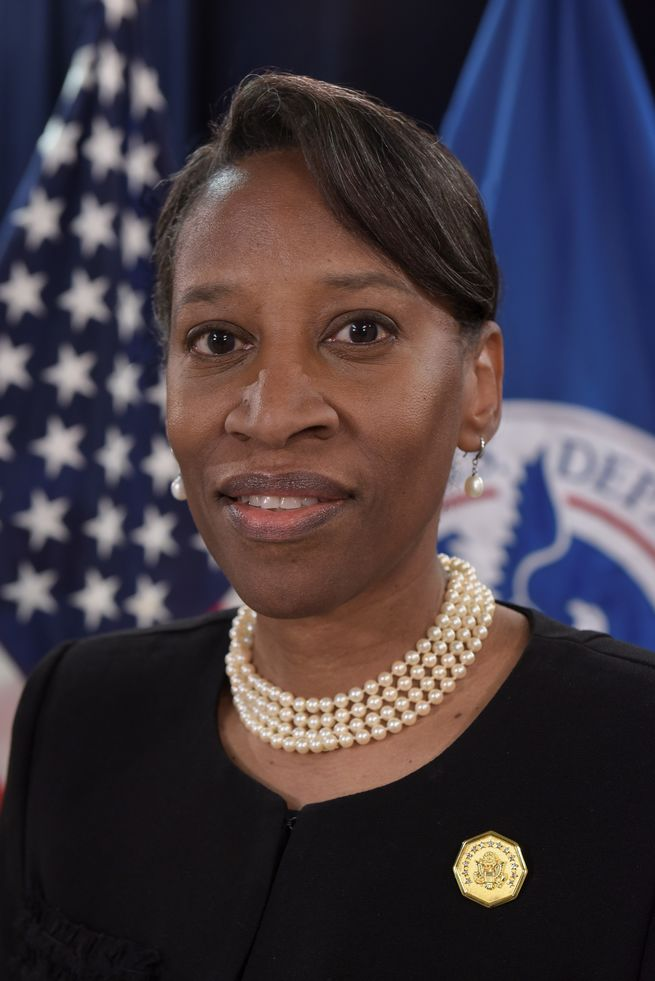

Judge of the United States Court of Appeals for the Armed Forces
- Incumbent
- Assumed office January 3, 2023
- Appointed by: Joe Biden
- Preceded by: Scott W. Stucky

Personal details
- Born: Musetta Tia Johnson; 1959 (age 66–67)
- Education: Hampton University (BA); Temple University (JD); University of Virginia (LLM); Judge Advocate General's Legal Center and School (LLM); United States Army War College (MSS)

Military service
- Allegiance: United States
- Branch/service: United States Army
- Rank: Colonel
- Unit: Army Judge Advocate General's Corps

Musetta Tia Johnson (born 1959) is an American lawyer and academic who is a judge of the United States Court of Appeals for the Armed Forces.

== Education ==
Johnson earned a Bachelor of Arts from Hampton University. While at Hampton University, she joined the Alpha Kappa Alpha sorority. Johnson earned a Juris Doctor from the Temple University Beasley School of Law, a Master of Laws from the University of Virginia School of Law, another Master of Laws from The Judge Advocate General's Legal Center and School, and a Master of Science in strategic studies from the United States Army War College.

== Career ==
Johnson began her career in the United States Army Judge Advocate General's Corps, where she specialized in international and national security law. She also served as a senior advisor to the director of U.S. Immigration and Customs Enforcement. In 2002, she became the first African-American female to be selected to the rank of Colonel in the U.S. Army's JAG Corps. During the Obama administration, she served as assistant secretary of the United States Department of Homeland Security for legislative affairs. She was a visiting fellow at the University of Virginia School of Law and is a professor of national security law at the Georgetown University Law Center.

=== Court of appeals service ===
On November 17, 2021, President Joe Biden announced his intent to nominate Johnson to serve as a Judge of the United States Court of Appeals for the Armed Forces. On January 7, 2022, her nomination was sent to the Senate. President Biden nominated Johnson to the seat vacated by Judge Scott W. Stucky, who assumed senior status on July 31, 2021. On March 22, 2022, a hearing was held before the Senate Armed Services Committee. On April 5, 2022, her nomination was reported out of committee by a voice vote. On December 15, 2022, the United States Senate confirmed her nomination by a 76–20 vote. She was sworn in on January 3, 2023.

Legal offices
Preceded by Scott W. Stucky	Judge of the United States Court of Appeals for the Armed Forces; 2023–present	Incumbent
