= Charles E. Erdmann =

American judge (born 1946)

Chip Erdmann
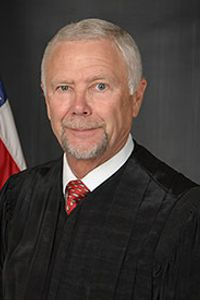

Senior Judge of the United States Court of Appeals for the Armed Forces
- Incumbent
- Assumed office July 31, 2017

Chief Judge of the United States Court of Appeals for the Armed Forces
- In office July 31, 2015 – July 31, 2017
- Preceded by: James E. Baker
- Succeeded by: Scott W. Stucky

Judge of the United States Court of Appeals for the Armed Forces
- In office October 15, 2002 – July 31, 2017
- Appointed by: George W. Bush
- Preceded by: Eugene R. Sullivan
- Succeeded by: Gregory E. Maggs

Justice of the Montana Supreme Court
- In office 1995–1998
- Appointed by: Marc Racicot
- Preceded by: Fred J. Weber
- Succeeded by: Jim Regnier

Personal details
- Born: Charles Edgar Erdmann; June 26, 1946 (age 79) Great Falls, Montana, U.S.
- Spouse: Renee Jacques
- Children: 4
- Education: Montana State University (BA); University of Montana (JD)

Military service
- Branch/service: United States Marine Corps; Montana Air National Guard
- Years of service: 1966–1969; 1981–2002
- Rank: Colonel
- Unit: Air Force Judge Advocate General's Corps

Charles Edgar "Chip" Erdmann (born June 26, 1946) is a Senior judge of the United States Court of Appeals for the Armed Forces. His term began on October 15, 2002, and expired on July 31, 2017.

== Education ==
Born in Great Falls, Montana, Erdmann graduated from Great Falls High School in 1964. He attended Montana State University and the University of Montana School of Law, graduating in 1972 and 1975 respectively. His college years were interrupted by three years of enlisted service in the United States Marine Corps (from 1967 to 1970).

== Legal career ==
From 1975 to 1976, he served as an assistant state attorney general in the Montana Department of Justice. He quickly established himself in the Montana legal community, becoming chief counsel in the Auditor's Office in 1976, chief staff attorney of the Antitrust Bureau in 1980, chief of the Montana Medicaid Fraud Bureau also in 1980, and general counsel of the Montana School Boards Association in 1982.

In 1986, he opened his own private practice in Helena and also served as a JAG officer in the Montana Air National Guard from 1981 to 2002, when he retired as a colonel.

=== Judicial career ===
In 1995, he was appointed as an associate justice of the Montana Supreme Court. He left in 1998 to become a judicial reform coordinator in the Office of the High Representative for Bosnia and Herzegovina. He soon became the head of the Human Rights and Rule of Law department, helping to reform the region's judicial system through several anti-corruption measures. In 2000, he became chief judge of the Bosnian Election Court. He served for only one year, at which point he became an independent consultant in Bosnia.

In 2002, Erdmann was appointed to the United States Court of Appeals for the Armed Forces by President George W. Bush.

Legal offices
Preceded by Fred J. Weber	Justice of the Montana Supreme Court; 1995–1998	Succeeded by Jim Regnier
Preceded by James E. Baker	Chief Judge of the United States Court of Appeals for the Armed Forces; 2015–2017	Succeeded by Scott W. Stucky
Preceded by Eugene R. Sullivan	Judge of the United States Court of Appeals for the Armed Forces; 2002–2017	Succeeded by Gregory E. Maggs
