= H. F. Gierke III =

American judge (1943–2016)

Senior Judge of the United States Court of Appeals for the Armed Forces
- In office September 30, 2006 – August 7, 2016

Chief Judge of the United States Court of Appeals for the Armed Forces
- In office October 1, 2004 – September 30, 2006
- Preceded by: Susan J. Crawford
- Succeeded by: Andrew S. Effron

Judge of the United States Court of Appeals for the Armed Forces
- In office November 20, 1991 – September 30, 2006
- Nominated by: George H. W. Bush
- Preceded by: New seat
- Succeeded by: Margaret A. Ryan

National Commander of The American Legion
- In office 1988–1989
- Preceded by: John P. Comer
- Succeeded by: Miles S. Epling

Personal details
- Born: Herman Fredrick Gierke III; March 13, 1943 Williston, North Dakota, U.S.
- Died: August 7, 2016 (aged 73) Bismarck, North Dakota, U.S.
- Resting place: North Dakota Veterans Cemetery, Mandan, North Dakota; 46°44′57.9″N 100°50′53.3″W
- Education: University of North Dakota (BA, JD)
- Nickname: "Sparky"

Military service
- Allegiance: United States
- Branch/service: US Army
- Years of service: 1967–1971
- Rank: Captain
- Unit: 1st Cavalry Division
- Battles/wars: Vietnam War
- Awards: Bronze Star Medal; Air Medal

Herman Fredrick "Sparky" Gierke III (March 13, 1943 – August 7, 2016) was an American judge who served as the Chief Judge of the United States Court of Appeals for the Armed Forces from 2004 to 2006. He was a Judge of the United States Court of Appeals for the Armed Forces, from 1991 to 2006, and a Justice of the North Dakota Supreme Court from 1983 to 1991. Gierke also served as the National Commander of The American Legion, from 1988 to 1989.

== Early life and career ==
Gierke earned his Bachelor of Arts and juris doctor degrees from the University of North Dakota. From there, he went on to serve in the United States Army Judge Advocate General's Corps between 1967 and 1971. This included one year as a military judge in Vietnam. During his active military service, he was awarded the Bronze Star Medal, Air Medal, Vietnam service and campaign medals. In 1983, Governor Allen Olson appointed him Justice of the North Dakota Supreme Court.

He was elected in 1984 and re-elected in 1986 for a 10-year term. In 1991, he resigned from the North Dakota Supreme court when President George H. W. Bush appointed him to the United States Court of Appeals for the Armed Forces. On October 1, 2004, he assumed duties of chief judge on the court of appeals. He later moved to Orlando, Florida, where he was a visiting professor, distinguished jurist, and adjunct instructor at the Dwayne O. Andreas School of Law (1998-2008).

== The American Legion ==
A member of Carl E. Rogen Post No. 29 of The American Legion in Watford City, North Dakota, his slogan as national commander was "Proud to be an American." Prior to his election as national commander at the Legion's 70th National Convention in Louisville, Kentucky, he served as commander of Post No. 29 (at age 36), as Department of North Dakota commander from 1983 to 1984, and as national vice commander from 1985 to 1986. During his tenure as national commander, Gierke was called upon to lead the initial challenges to the Supreme Court's Texas v. Johnson decision, which extended free speech rights to desecration of the U.S. flag.

== Death ==
Gierke died on August 7, 2016, at the age of 73, in Bismarck, North Dakota.

== Honors ==
Gierke served as President of the North Dakota Blue Star Bar Association (1982-1983) and was a professor at the George Washington University Law School and The Catholic University of America. In 2002 and 2004, he was honored as the Best Adjunct Faculty Member at CUA's Columbus School of Law.

== See also ==
- List of justices of the North Dakota Supreme Court
- List of people from North Dakota
- List of University of North Dakota people

Non-profit organization positions
Preceded by John P. Comer	National Commander of The American Legion; 1988 – 1989	Succeeded by Miles S. Epling
Legal offices
New seat	Judge of the United States Court of Appeals for the Armed Forces; 1991 – 2004	Succeeded by Margaret A. Ryan
Preceded by Susan J. Crawford	Chief Judge of the United States Court of Appeals for the Armed Forces; 2004 – 2006	Succeeded by Andrew S. Effron
