= Gregory E. Maggs =

American judge (born 1964)

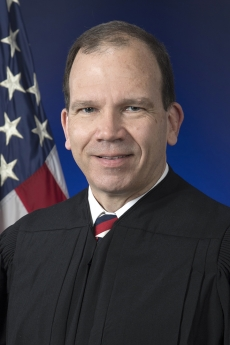

Judge of the United States Court of Appeals for the Armed Forces
- Incumbent
- Assumed office February 2, 2018
- Appointed by: Donald Trump
- Preceded by: Charles E. Erdmann

Personal details
- Born: Gregory Eaton Maggs; June 27, 1964 (age 61) Cambridge, Massachusetts, U.S.
- Education: Harvard University (BA, JD); United States Army War College (MSS)

Military service
- Allegiance: United States
- Branch/service: United States Army
- Years of service: 1990–2018
- Rank: Colonel
- Unit: United States Army Reserve; Army Judge Advocate General's Corps

Gregory Eaton Maggs (born June 27, 1964) is an American lawyer and jurist who serves as a federal judge of the United States Court of Appeals for the Armed Forces. He was previously the Arthur Selwyn Miller Research Professor of Law and co-director of the National Security & U.S. Foreign Relations Law Program at the George Washington University Law School.

== Biography ==
Maggs was born in Cambridge, Massachusetts, and raised in Urbana, Illinois. He earned his Bachelor of Arts, summa cum laude, from Harvard College, where he was inducted into Phi Beta Kappa and was designated a John Harvard Scholar. He then graduated with a Juris Doctor from Harvard Law School, magna cum laude, where he served as articles co-chair of the Harvard Law Review. He also earned a Master of Strategic Studies from the United States Army War College.

Upon graduation from law school, he served as a law clerk to Judge Joseph Tyree Sneed III of the United States Court of Appeals for the Ninth Circuit and Associate Justices Clarence Thomas and Anthony Kennedy of the Supreme Court of the United States.

Maggs served in the United States Army Reserve, Judge Advocate General's Corps, for more than 28 years. He received his commission in 1990, was mobilized from 2007 to 2008, and retired with the rank of colonel in 2018 upon his appointment to the United States Court of Appeals for the Armed Forces. From 2007 to 2017, he was assigned as a reserve trial and appellate military judge.

He is the co-author of a leading military law casebook, Modern Military Justice: Cases and Materials, and has published two related books, along with dozens of articles in the fields of constitutional law and national security.

He was a member of the faculty of the George Washington University Law School in Washington, D.C. from 1993 until his appointment as a judge in 2018. At the time of his appointment, he was the Arthur Selwyn Miller Research Professor of Law and co-director of the National Security & U.S. Foreign Relations Law Program. He taught and wrote in the areas of constitutional law, counter-terrorism, military justice, and national security law. In 2010–2011 and 2013–2014, he served as the school's interim dean.

Maggs is a member of the American Law Institute.

Judge Maggs' father, Peter Maggs, and his grandfather, Douglas Maggs, were also both law professors, at Illinois and Duke, respectively.

== Court of Appeals service ==
On September 28, 2017, President Trump announced his intent to nominate Maggs to serve as a Judge of the United States Court of Appeals for the Armed Forces. He was nominated to that court on October 2, 2017, to the seat vacated by Judge Charles E. Erdmann, when his term expired on July 31, 2017. On November 14, 2017, a hearing on his nomination was held before the United States Senate Committee on Armed Services. On November 16, 2017, his nomination was reported out of committee by voice vote, and on January 30, 2018, the Senate confirmed his nomination by voice vote. He was sworn in on February 2, 2018.

== See also ==
- List of law clerks for the first seat of the Supreme Court of the United States
- List of law clerks for the tenth seat of the Supreme Court of the United States

== Selected publications ==
- Maggs, Gregory E. (2015). Modern Military Justice: Cases and Materials (2d ed.). Eagen, MN: West Academic Publishing. ISBN 978-1634598279.

Legal offices
Preceded by Charles E. Erdmann	Judge of the United States Court of Appeals for the Armed Forces; 2018–present	Incumbent
