= James A. Baker (disambiguation) =

James Addison Baker III (born 1930) is an American attorney, statesman, and political figure.

James A. Baker may also refer to:

- James A. Baker (born 1821) (1821–1897), American jurist and politician; often called "Judge Baker"
- James A. Baker (born 1857) (1857–1941), American attorney often called "Captain Baker"
- James A. Baker (trade unionist) (before 1875 – after 1903), Canadian miner and trade unionist
- James A. Baker Jr. (1892–1973), American attorney
- James A. Baker (justice) (1931–2008), American jurist who served on the Texas Supreme Court from 1995 to 2003
- James A. Baker (government attorney) (fl. 1980s–2010s), American Department of Justice official; Counsel for Intelligence Policy

== See also ==
- James Addison Baker (disambiguation)
- James Baker (disambiguation)
