= James Addison Baker =

James Addison Baker may refer to:

- James A. Baker (born 1821) (1821–1897), American jurist and politician
- James A. Baker (born 1857) (1857–1941), American attorney
- James A. Baker Jr. (1892–1973), American attorney
- James A. Baker III (born 1930), American attorney, politician and diplomat

== See also ==
- James Baker (disambiguation)
