= Jean Dalby Clift =

American priest (1930–2020)

The Reverend Dr. Jean Dalby Clift
- Born: February 21, 1930; Naples, Texas, US
- Died: February 1, 2020 (aged 89); Olympia, Washington, US
- Education: University of Texas, University of Denver
- Known for: Pastoral counseling, analytical psychology, typology, the collective unconscious, dream interpretation, the archetype, anima and animus,
- Spouse: Wallace Clift
- Scientific career
- Fields: Pastoral counseling, psychology, psychotherapy, analytical psychology
- Workplaces: American Association of Pastoral Counselors

Jean Dalby Clift (1930–2020) was an American priest of the Episcopal Church and a pastoral counselor in private practice. She was the author of books in the fields of psychology and spirituality. "Dr. Clift has had many roles in her life, including lawyer, spiritual director, pastoral counselor, author, lecturer, workshop presenter, priest, mother, grandmother, and poet." She lectured and gave workshops in the United States, Australia, Europe, Asia and Africa on such topics as pastoral counseling, prayer, spiritual growth, journaling, pilgrimage, and the Myers-Briggs Type Indicator. Three of her five books were co-authored with her husband, the Reverend Wallace Clift.

== Early career and education ==
Born February 21, 1930, in Texas, Clift received a B.A. (1950) and J.D. (1952) from the University of Texas at Austin. She practiced law at Baker, Botts, Andrews and Parish in Houston, Texas, and in 1954 married another attorney at the firm, Wallace Clift. After her husband went to seminary, Jean Clift became involved in prayer ministry. In 1964, Jean and Wallace Clift were awarded a joint grant by the Farish Foundation to study the psychology of Carl Jung. At the C. G. Jung Institute in Zürich, Switzerland, she studied for two years with analyst Marie-Louise von Franz, to whom she dedicated one of her books.

== Academic career ==
Clift applied her psychological training to the study of literature, earning a Ph.D. from the University of Denver in 1978 with the dissertation Little Nell and the lost feminine: An archetypal analysis of some projections in Victorian culture (1978). She co-founded the C. G. Jung Society of Colorado in 1976, and remained a trustee until her death. From 1975 to 1980, Clift was the first non-Catholic to hold the position of Director of the Center for Religious Meaning at Loretto Heights College. She also served as a faculty advisor for Loretto Heights' University Without Walls program for re-entry students, and taught short courses in religious studies and the humanities. In 1980, she was elected president of the American Academy of Religion, Rocky Mountain-Great Plains Region. After Clift left Loretto Heights in 1980, she continued her involvement with teaching as an adjunct professor of Anglican studies until 2002, first at St. Thomas Seminary and then at the Iliff School of Theology. In 2000, the Wallace B. and Jean Dalby Clift Scholarship Fund, to provide funds for students enrolled in Iliff's Anglican Studies Program, was endowed by Bette Lanning in recognition of the contributions made by Clift and her husband.

== Pastoral counseling and ministry ==
Clift left Loretto Heights in 1980 to establish a private counseling practice. She joined the American Association of Pastoral Counselors in 1982, and served as its president from 1994 to 1996. She was ordained a priest in the Episcopal Diocese of Colorado in 1988. She was a member of the Pastoral Intervention Team for the same diocese, where she was also chair of the Pastoral Counseling Guidelines for Clerical Ethics. She gave numerous workshops on pastoral counseling, dream interpretation, journaling, spiritual growth, and pilgrimage. She was Canon Pastor Emeritus of the Episcopal Diocese of Colorado and an associate priest at the Cathedral of St. John in the Wilderness.

== Publications ==
=== Books ===
- Clift, Jean Dalby; Clift, Wallace (1984). Symbols of Transformation in Dreams. The Crossroad Publishing Company. ISBN 0-8245-0653-7. Australia: ISBN 978-0-8245-0727-5.
- Clift, Jean Dalby; Clift, Wallace (1988). The Hero Journey in Dreams. The Crossroad Publishing Company. ISBN 0-8245-0889-0.
- Clift, Jean Dalby (1992). Core Images of the Self: A Symbolic Approach to Healing and Wholeness. The Crossroad Publishing Company. ISBN 0-8245-1218-9.
- Clift, Jean Dalby; Clift, Wallace (1996). The Archetype of Pilgrimage: Outer Action With Inner Meaning. The Paulist Press. ISBN 0-8091-3599-X. Republished 2004 by Wipf & Stock, ISBN 1-59244-543-8. Australia: ISBN 978-1-59244-543-1.
- Clift, Jean Dalby (2008). The Mystery of Love and the Path of Prayer. CreateSpace Independent Publishing Platform. ISBN 978-1-4404-6637-3.

=== Articles ===
- Clift, Jean Dalby (1985). "Pastoral Ministry: A Macedonian Plea". Journal of Women Ministers.
- Clift, Jean Dalby (1988). "An Excerpt from Responses to Ordination Questions". Journal of Women and Religion. ISSN 0888-5621.
- Clift, Jean Dalby (1988). "Theory and Practice in Clinical Supervision in Pastoral Counseling". Journal of Supervision & Training in Ministry.
- Clift, Jean Dalby (2001). "Pastoral Implications". Lectionary Homiletics. XIII (1): 3–4, 11, 18–19, 25, 32–33.
- Clift, Jean Dalby (2003). "The Beginning of My Healing Mystery". American Journal of Pastoral Counseling. 6 (2): 63–66. doi:10.1300/j062v06n02_05. S2CID 71586183.
- Clift, Jean Dalby (2006). "Where Would You Be Now?". Journeys. 8.

=== Poems and prayers ===
- Clift, Jean Dalby (2000), "4 prayers", in Geitz, Elizabeth Rankin; Burke, Marjorie A.; Smith, Ann (eds.), Women's Uncommon Prayers: Our Lives Revealed, Nurtured, Celebrated, Morehouse Publishing, pp. 172, 173, 255, 327, ISBN 0819218642
- Clift, Jean Dalby (1967). "15 Poems". The Living Church.

=== Encyclopedia entries ===
- Clift, Jean Dalby; Clift, Wallace (2012). "Symbols of Transformation in Dreams" in Encyclopedia of Psychology and Religion. 2nd ed. (Leeming, D., ed.) Berlin Heidelberg: Springer-Verlag
