= Angela Blanchard =

American policy advisor

- Born: Beaumont, Texas
- Education: Lamar University (BBA)
- Occupations: CEO, policy advisor
- Awards: Heinz Award
- Website: angelablanchard.com

Angela Blanchard is an American policy adviser who was previously the CEO and president of the nonprofit BakerRipley (also known as Neighborhood Centers). She is considered an expert practitioner in community development and has been honored for her advocacy on behalf of immigrants and immigration.

== Early life and education ==
Blanchard grew up in Beaumont, Texas in a Cajun family. She graduated from Lamar University in 1984 with a Bachelor of Business Administration in accounting.

== Career ==
Blanchard took on the role of CEO and president of the nonprofit BakerRipley in 1995. During her tenure, she grew the operating budget of BakerRipley to $220 million and instituted a neighborhood-focused approach within the organization. Blanchard described her role as being focused "on the experience of people displaced by 'war or weather'", including helping people obtain US citizenship, employment, and a residence. In an interview with Robert Denhardt, Blanchard has acknowledged how immigration can be seen as a contentious issue in red Texas, but stressed that "70% of the population of the area has come from somewhere else". In Bruce Katz's 2013 book The Metropolitan Revolution, Blanchard stated her mission for BakerRipley is to "go where you're invited, do what you're asked to do". During her tenure as CEO, she helped to provide service to over 500,000 people along the Gulf Coast each year. Blanchard resigned from BakerRipley in 2017.

When Hurricane Harvey struck Houston, Blanchard was consulted by government officials to help establish "the largest shelter" in the city to assist the storm victims. Starting in 2024, Blanchard worked for Houston mayor John Whitmire as the city's chief recovery and resilience officer, bringing her experience with disaster recovery and weatherization. She stepped down from the role in 2025.

== Awards and honors ==
- In 2007, the National Underground Railroad Freedom Center honored Blanchard with the Everyday Freedom Hero award for her advocacy for immigrants
- In 2011, Blanchard received the ARAMARK Building Community Innovation Award in recognition of her work in the Greater Houston area
- In 2013, Blanchard was the recipient of the Hannah G. Solomon award by the National Council of Jewish Women
- In 2017, Blanchard received the Heinz Award in the Human Condition category for her lifetime of work in community development

Blanchard received the Compassion Award from the Chinese Community Center.
