= Main Street Theater =

Theatre company in Houston, Texas

Coordinates: 29.7168°N 95.4179°W

Main Street Theater is a theatre company in the city of Houston, Texas. It consistently produces a repertoire of classic and contemporary plays, and its seasons generally run throughout the entire year.

== History ==
Main Street was the first of several theatre groups established in Houston, Texas, during the 1970s. It was founded to meet two needs: offer Houston theatergoers a more varied and challenging selection of plays and musicals and provide a venue for training, employment and exposure for the city's professional theater artists.

Founding Artistic Director Rebecca Greene Udden enlisted a collection of theater professionals in a temporary home at Autry House, the Episcopal Diocese's community center on Main Street—hence, the new group's name. The first production under the name Main Street Theater was Noël Coward's Hay Fever in June 1975.

In 1981, Main Street moved to its present home in an abandoned dry-cleaning plant at 2540 Times Boulevard in University Village. In the 92-seat space, with little to separate actor and audience, Main Street Theater developed an intimate style, which is as suited to the grand scale of Shakespeare as it is to a one-person show. The company opened a second space with a 190-seat theater in February 1996. "Main Street Theater at Chelsea Market" houses a stage dedicated to the youth theater program, as well as to large-scale classics and musical theatre.

== Today ==
In 2001, after several years of presenting Equity actors under a special agreement, Main Street Theater became an Equity Professional Company. It operates under contract as an AEA Small Professional Theater.

In summer 2006, Main Street Theater was chosen as one of 36 theaters nationwide to receive a grant from the National Endowment for the Arts (NEA) as part of "Shakespeare for a New Generation", a national theater initiative sponsored by the NEA and Arts Midwest. The grant allowed the Main Street Youth Theater to tour a production of Shakespeare’s Taming of the Shrew throughout Houston-area middle schools and high schools during the fall 2006 season.

In the 2011–2012 season, Main Street Theater produced The Coast of Utopia trilogy by Tom Stoppard. This was the fifth production of the full trilogy in the world and the second production in the United States.

Also in 2012, Main Street Theater was profiled in American Theatre Magazine.
