= James L. Autry House =

James L. Autry House may refer to:

- James L. Autry House (Rice University), a community center located within the Edward Albert Palmer Memorial Chapel and Autry House, NRHP-listed
- James L. Autry House (Courtlandt Place, Houston), a private residence built for James L. Autry, NRHP-listed
