= Broadacres, Houston =

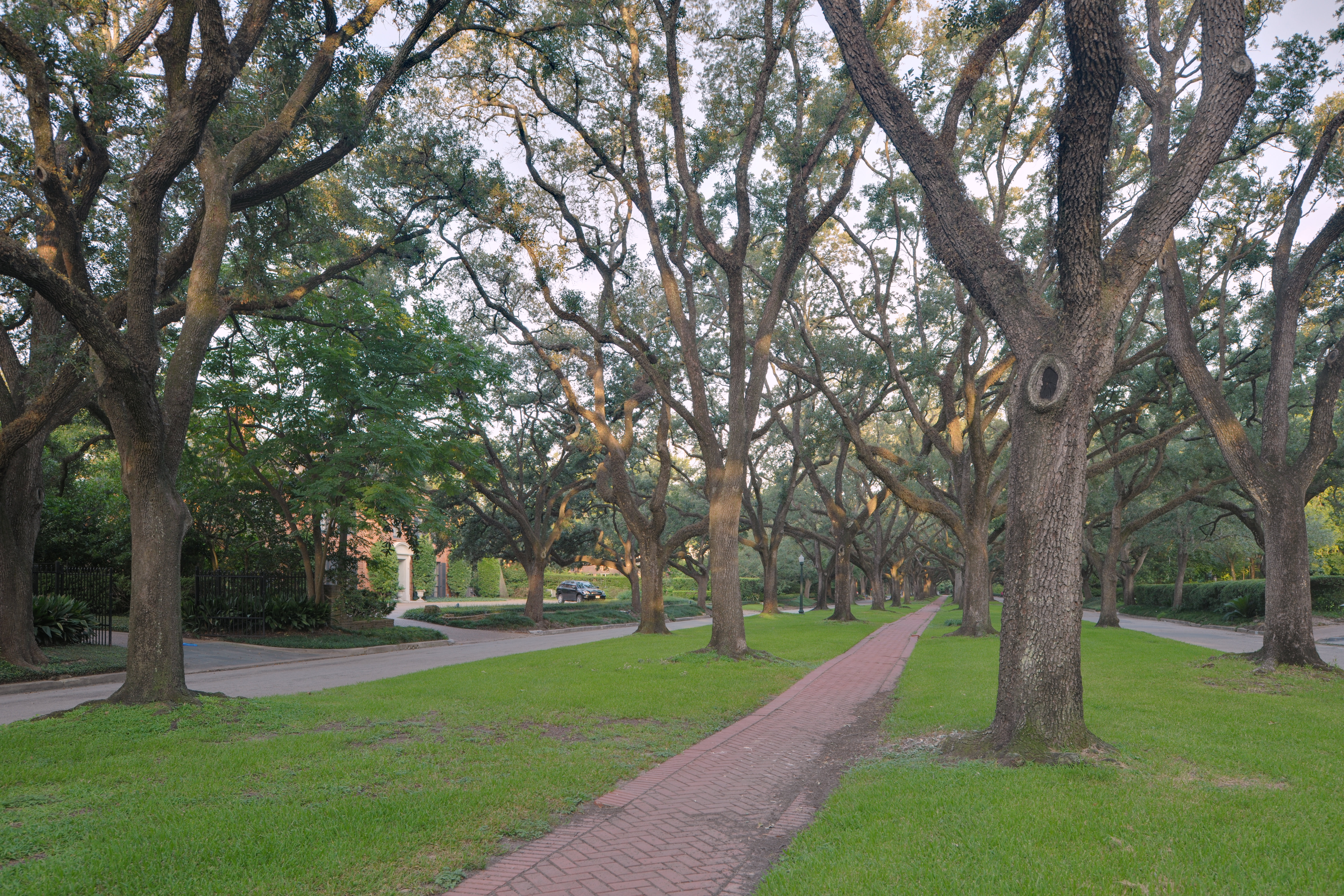
View of the Broadacres Historic District (Houston, Texas, USA), looking west-southwest from the median esplanade across from the 1314 street address.

Broadacres is a subdivision in Houston, Texas, United States, within the Boulevard Oaks community. It is located north of Bissonnet Street, south of U.S. Route 59, west of the Houston Museum District, and east of other subdivisions of Boulevard Oaks. The neighborhood is known for its large lots, historic preservationism, broad tree canopies, wide streets with medians, and affluence.

== History ==
- Broadacres Historic District
- U.S. National Register of Historic Places
- U.S. Historic district
- Location within Texas Location within the United States
- Location: 1300-1506 North Blvd. and 1305-1515 South Blvd., Houston, Texas
- Coordinates: 29.727°N 95.397°W
- Area: 34.2 acres (13.8 ha)
- Architect: Birdsall Briscoe, John F. Staub
- Architectural style: Colonial Revival, Tudor Revival, Mission/Spanish Revival
- NRHP reference No.: 80004128
- Added to NRHP: April 16, 1980

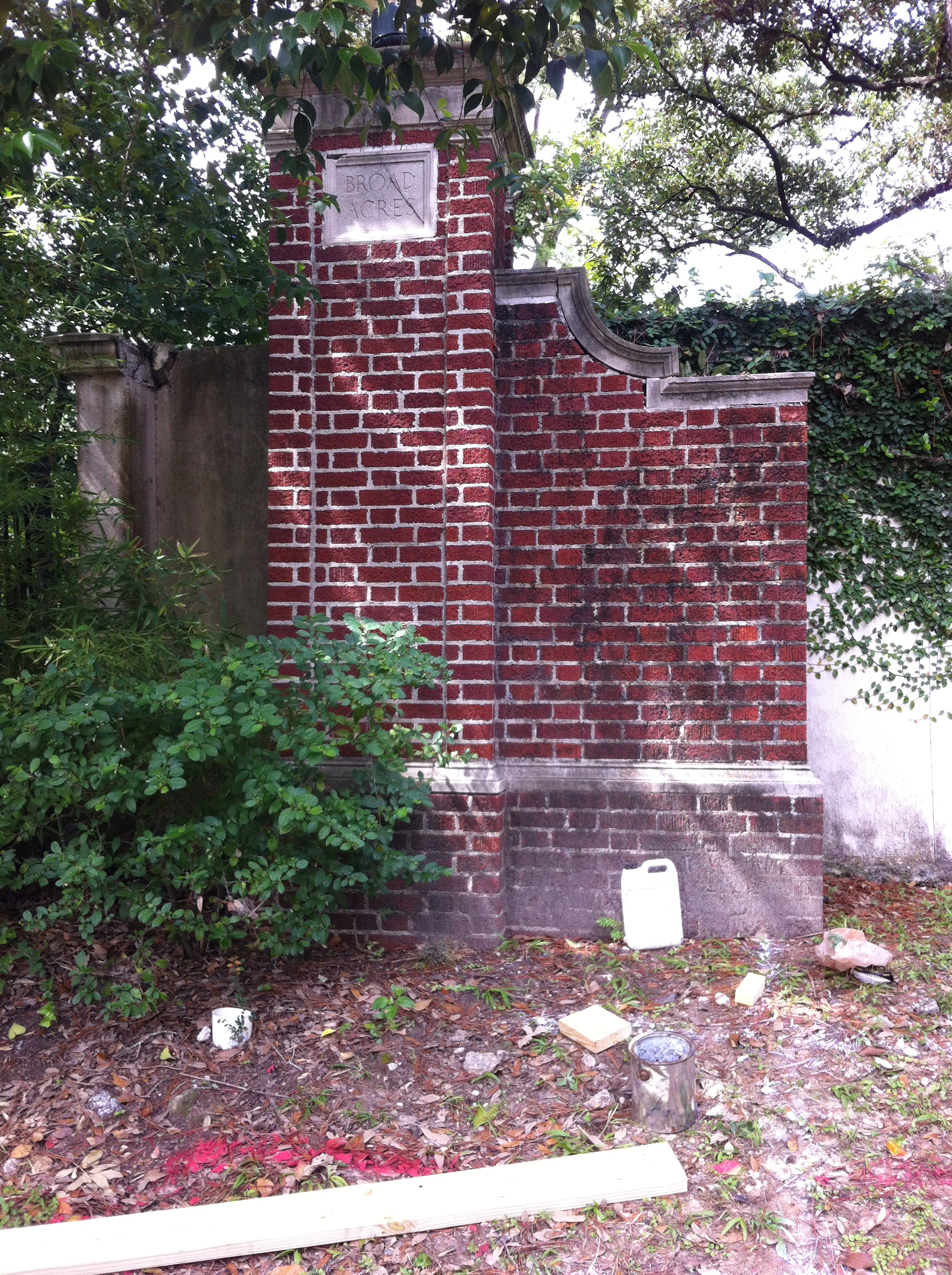
Broadacres subdivision marker

Broadacres was developed by prominent Houston attorney and banker Captain James A. Baker in cooperation with his son, attorney James A. Baker, Jr., in the early 1920s. Baker, Sr. had purchased a 32-acre (13-hectare) parcel of property north of Rice University – and close to the burgeoning new Museum District – in 1908. In 1922, his son and seventeen other investors purchased the land, which had been subdivided into 26 lots, and began constructing infrastructure and the first set of homes. Kate Sayen Kirkland, author of James A. Baker of Houston, 1857-1941, said that "the Bakers conceived their Broadacres enclave as a public amenity distinguished by fine architecture and distinctive planning but limited in ownership to personal and professional friends invited to invest in the project." William Ward Watkin, a prominent Houston architect, devised the master plan for the development; Watkin, Birdsall P. Briscoe, and John Staub served as architects for several of the houses. The families who had houses built in Broadacres were not singular architectural patrons.

Construction in Broadacres ceased during the Great Depression. James A. Baker, Jr. never lived in Broadacres, because he believed he would be unable to afford a $20,000 (about $367,173 today) down payment for a lot. By the 1930s, Broadacres "collectively displayed its residents as a Houston upper class," according to Rice University architectural historian Stephen Fox.

In 1980, the family of Gus Sessions Wortham, a local businessman and philanthropist, donated his former house to the University of Houston System for use as the chancellor's residence. The three-storey house, which sits on 1.82 acres (7,400 m^{2}) of land, was constructed by oilman Frank Sterling and was the most expensive in the neighborhood upon its completion in 1927. The chancellor is required by contract to live at the Wortham House. Only the second floor of the residence is reserved for the chancellor; the first and third floors are reserved for artwork and public events. It is a contributing property to the Broadacres district. It was scheduled to undergo a renovation in 2017. As of 2009 the value was about $6 million.

The Broadacres Historic District, which includes 18 contributing buildings at 1300-1506 North Blvd. and 1305-1515 South Blvd., was listed on the National Register of Historic Places in 1980. It includes works designed by architects Birdsall Briscoe and John F. Staub.

== Cityscape ==
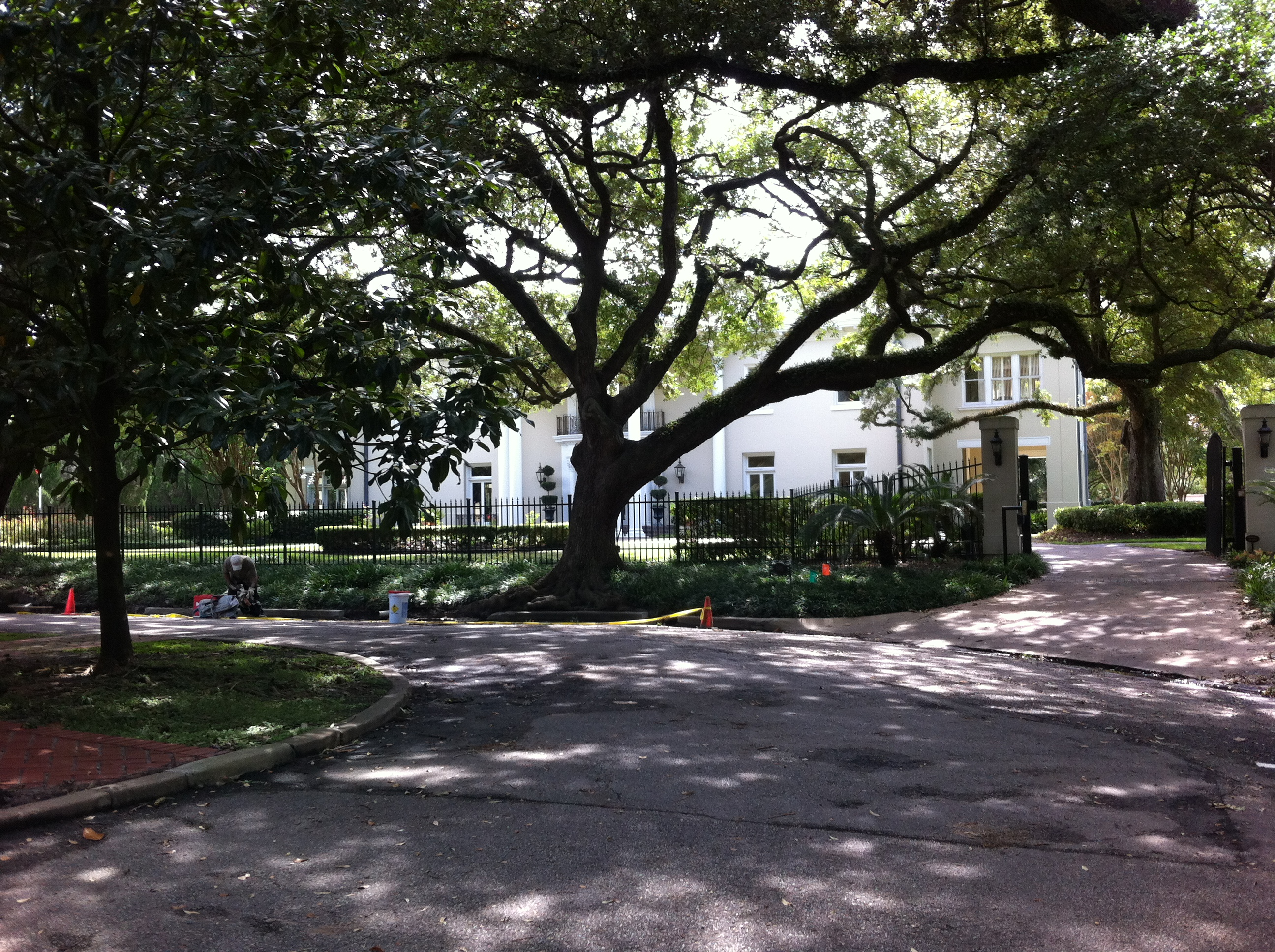
The Wortham House, the residence of the Chancellor of the University of Houston and the University of Houston System

Kate Sayen Kirkland, author of James A. Baker of Houston, 1857-1941, said "Typical of the finest homes being constructed in Houston during the 1920s, the houses in Broadacres represent the eclectic style favored by the country house movement prevalent in that era." Stephen Fox, author of The Country Houses of John F. Staub, said that in the 1920s "the entire neighborhood of Broadacres attained a collective identity that emphasized—through the beauty and decorum of individual houses and their systematic integration into a hierarchical landscape order that moved rhythmically measured sequences from the space of each country house, to its garden, to the space of the community, to the space of the planned garden city— the discernment, authority and what [Richard L. Bushman, a cultural historian] called "radiance" of its residents." Fox said that "[i]t is the extraordinary collective impact that Broadacres's landscape still exerts that makes it such an instructive example of how elite community was socially constructed in Houston through architecture and landscape architecture during the 1920s."

== Education ==
Broadacres is within the Houston Independent School District. Zoned schools include Poe Elementary School (located in Boulevard Oaks), Lanier Middle School (located in Neartown), and Lamar High School (located in Upper Kirby).

== Notable residents ==
- Renu Khator (Chancellor of the University of Houston System and President of the University of Houston)
- William P. Hobby (Lieutenant Governor of Texas)

== Gallery ==
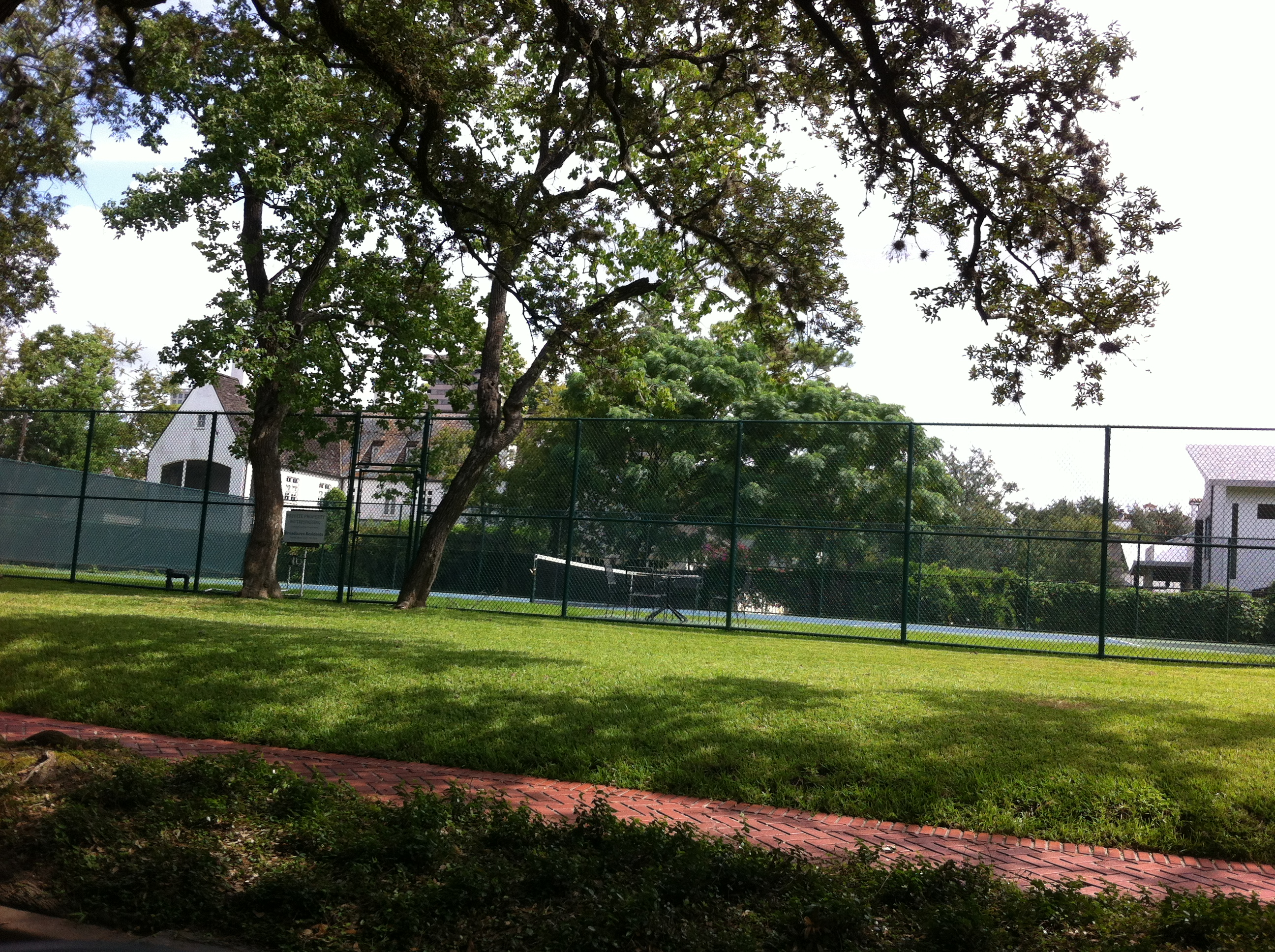
Broadacres Park
