= James A. Baker Jr. =

American lawyer & banker (1892–1973)

- Born: November 3, 1892
- Died: May 21, 1973 (aged 80)
- Education: The Hill School, Princeton University, University of Texas Law School
- Occupations: Attorney and developer
- Known for: Baker Botts
- Notable work: Broadacres subdivision, Houston, Texas
- Spouse: Bonner Means (m. 1917)
- Children: James Addison Baker III; Bonner Means Baker
- Parent(s): James A. Baker; Alice Graham Baker
- Military career
- Allegiance: Allied Powers
- Branch: United States Army
- Service years: 1918–1919
- Rank: Captain
- Units: 359th Regiment, 90th Division
- Conflicts: World War I: St. Mihiel, Verdun

James Addison Baker Jr. (Note: He is actually the third-generation successive James Addison Baker in his family, despite using the "Jr." generational suffix.) (November 3, 1892 – May 21, 1973) was an American attorney, banker, real estate developer, and United States Army officer from Houston, Texas. He was the third in a succession of men named James Addison Baker, all of whom were attorneys for Baker Botts or its antecedents. His son is James Addison Baker III, former United States Secretary of State.

== Early life ==
James A. Baker Jr. was born on 3 November 1892, to Captain James A. Baker and Alice Graham Baker in Houston, Texas. In 1911, Baker graduated from The Hill School in Pottstown, Pennsylvania, and enrolled at Princeton University in the fall.

== Career ==
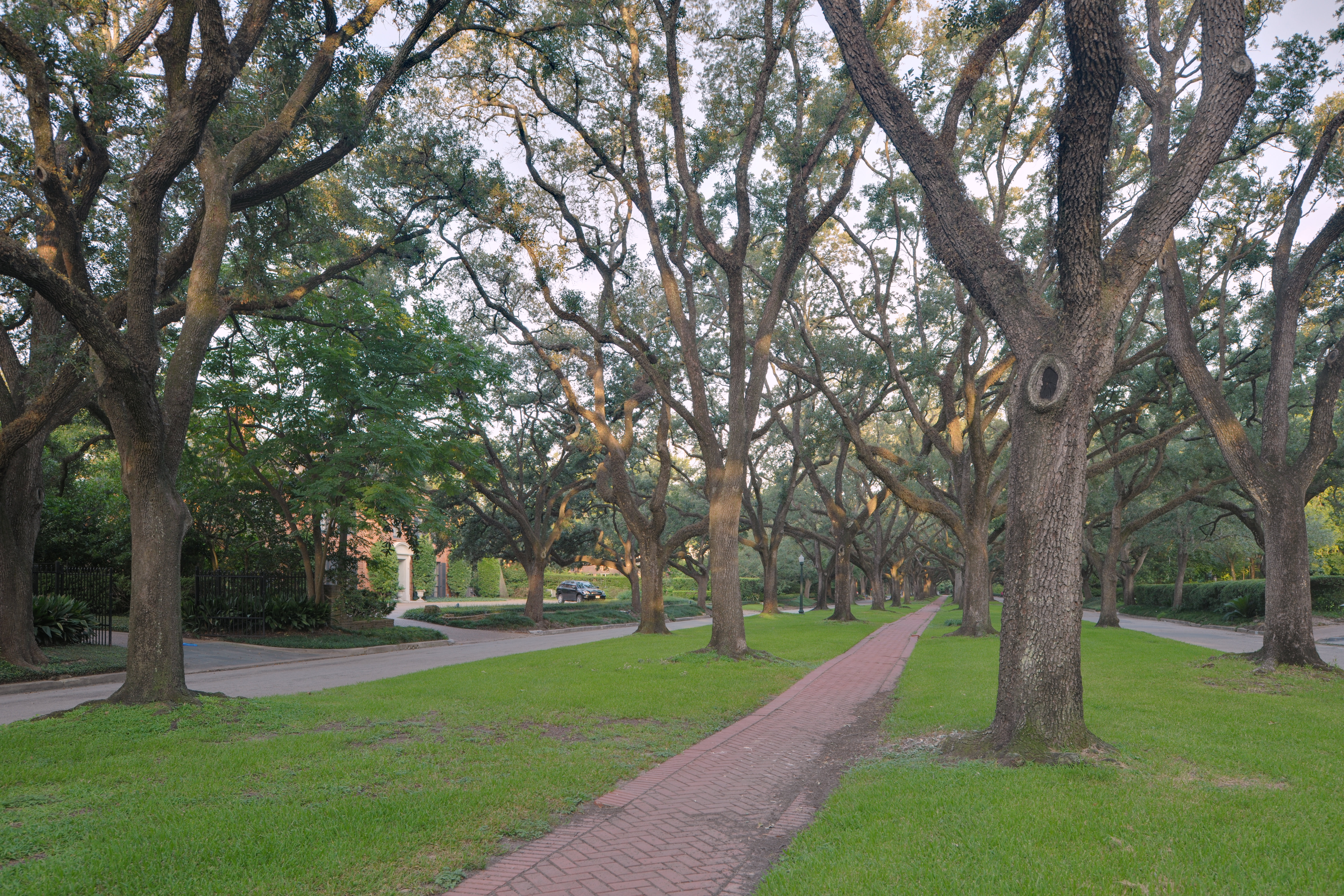
Esplanade of the Broadacres subdivision, Houston

Portrayal of Battle of St. Mihiel

Baker interrupted his law classes at the University of Texas to volunteer for World War I. He reported to Quartermaster School in San Antonio commissioned as a lieutenant, and began his tour with the 90th Division's 359th Infantry Regiment on the western front in July 1918. His company fought from the trenches during the Battle of Saint-Mihiel in the fall. After a two-week break from the front, his division took over for the 5th Division and endured the trenches for seventy-five days straight. He was the only officer in his unit to survive without being wounded, and he was promoted to Captain while being cited for valor. He joined the occupation forces in Germany after the cessation of hostilities. The Army ordered him discharged and he reached American soil on April 4, 1919.

Baker and his father developed Broadacres, an exclusive subdivision sited north of Rice University. At its conception in 1922–1923, this tract was surrounded by non-commercial uses. In addition to the university, Hermann Park, the land for the future Museum of Fine Arts were in proximity. Two other wealthy subdivisions, Southampton and Shadyside, buffered Broadacres from commercial development. The Bakers sold seventeen large lots to investors who also advanced $150,000 to the development for capital improvements. Baker took over the management of the subdivision, while Herbert A. Kipp platted and engineered the twenty-five lot site. Rice architect William Ward Watkin laid out the landscaping and designed a new Spanish-Mediterranean home for Captain Baker. When the infrastructure for Broadacres was completed by September 24, 1924, Baker announced that the assessments to lot owners would be reduced because the final bills came in below estimated costs. Though his parents resided at Broadacres, Baker developed a lot in a neighboring subdivision on Poor Farm Road in 1926.

== Personal life ==
Baker married Bonner Means on August 4, 1917. The two met while they were attending the University of Texas and they engaged on 9 May 1917. As Baker anticipated his military orders, the couple accelerated their wedding schedule and scaled down the event. After the marriage, they honeymooned at Mackinac Island, Michigan. From 1927, the Bakers resided at their house on the curve on Poor Farm Road (Bissonnet Street) in the Turner Addition. Their neighbors included relatives and friends: Browne and Adelaide Lovett Baker, Malcolm Lovett, and William Kirkland. The Bakers lived at this address for the rest of their married lives.

His father, also named James Addison Baker, was a partner of Baker, Botts and Baker and other antecedent of Baker Botts. James Addison Baker Jr. became a partner after ten years with the firm. Today, the law firm is called Baker Botts, a major United States-based international law firm of around 800 attorneys.

His son, James A. Baker III, is the political figure especially known from the Ronald Reagan and George H. W. Bush administrations.
