= American Association of Pastoral Counselors =

The American Association of Pastoral Counselors was a professional organization of pastoral counselors from a variety of religious and psychological traditions. In 2019, AAPC consolidated with the Association for Clinical Pastoral Education (ACPE) and now exists within the organization as the ACPE Psychotherapy Commission.

== Membership ==
The association defined a pastoral counselor as "a minister who practices pastoral counseling at an advanced level which integrates religious resources with insights from the behavioral sciences" and pastoral counseling as "a process in which a pastoral counselor utilizes insights and principles derived from the disciplines of theology and the behavioral sciences in working with individuals, couples, families, groups and social systems toward the achievement of wholeness and health." The association is nonsectarian and includes members from a variety of faith groups.

American Association of Pastoral Counselors previously certified different levels of pastoral counselors, accredited pastoral counseling centers, and approved programs to train pastoral counselors. As of 2008, American Association of Pastoral Counselors had a membership of over 3,000 pastoral counselors and 100 pastoral counseling centers.

== History ==
The association was founded in 1963 with the purpose of establishing standards for professional preparation and professional ethics in what was then the relatively new field of pastoral counseling.

== Professional standards ==
In 2004, American Association of Pastoral Counselors joined with five other religious mental health professional organizations (Association of Professional Chaplains, Association for Clinical Pastoral Education, National Association of Catholic Chaplains, National Association of Jewish Chaplains, and Canadian Association for Pastoral Practice and Education) to establish common standards for ethics and professional conduct.

The AAPC Code of Ethics, originally adopted in 2004 and amended in 2012, continues to be included in the curriculum of the ACPE Pastoral Care Specialist program.

== Consolidation with ACPE ==
In 2019, members of AAPC voted to consolidate with the Association for Clinical Pastoral Education (ACPE). AAPC as a legal entity was dissolved, and the two organizations now function as one. Former members and leaders of AAPC now exist within ACPE as the ACPE Psychotherapy Commission.
