= Wallace Clift =

The Reverend Dr. Wallace Clift
- Born: March 27, 1926; Robert Lee, Texas
- Died: February 5, 2018 (aged 91); Olympia, Washington
- Occupation: Academic
- Spouse: Jean Dalby Clift

Academic background
- Education: University of Texas, Harvard University, Church Divinity School of the Pacific, University of Chicago Divinity School
- Thesis: Psychological and Biblical-Theological Perspectives on Hope from the Viewpoints of C. G. Jung and John Knox
- Influences: Carl Jung, Jolande Jacobi

Academic work
- Discipline: Religious studies
- Sub-discipline: Jungian psychology
- Institutions: University of Denver, Iliff School of Theology
- Notable works: Jung and Christianity (1982)

Wallace Bruce Clift, Jr. (March 27, 1926 – February 5, 2018) was an American priest and academic. He was the author of several books and articles in the field of the psychology of religion and a professor emeritus at the University of Denver, where he chaired the Department of Religion for many years. He lectured and gave workshops extensively in the United States, Australia, Europe, and Asia on such topics as Jungian psychology, Christian theology, pilgrimage, spiritual growth, dream interpretation, journaling, and the Myers-Briggs Type Indicator. Clift published six books, three of which were co-authored with his wife, the Reverend Jean Dalby Clift.

== Early career and education ==
Clift earned a bachelor's degree with honors in economics and government from the University of Texas at Austin in 1949. He then went on to earn a law degree at Harvard Law School in 1952, and practiced law at Baker, Botts, Andrews and Parish in Houston, Texas, before attending seminary. He married another attorney at the firm, Jean Dalby, in 1954. In 1960, he earned an M.Div. from the Church Divinity School of the Pacific. Ordained deacon in 1960 and priest in 1961, Clift served as vicar of Grace Church and the Church of the Resurrection in Houston until 1964. While in Houston, Clift attended the major address by then-presidential candidate Senator John F. Kennedy to the Greater Houston Ministerial Association on September 12, 1960, regarding Kennedy's ability to make decisions independent of the Roman Catholic Church (he is viewable at the 1:38 mark in the recorded video of the address).

In 1964, Clift received a Farish Foundation grant to study the psychology of Carl Jung. He studied from 1964 to 1966 at the C. G. Jung Institute in Zürich, Switzerland, where he worked with analyst Jolande Jacobi. He earned his Ph.D. from the University of Chicago Divinity School with his dissertation "Psychological and Biblical-Theological Perspectives on Hope from the Viewpoints of C. G. Jung and John Knox".

== Academic career ==
Clift taught psychology of religion at the University of Denver from 1969 to 1992, and in 1981 helped start its joint Ph.D. program in religious and theological studies with the Iliff School of Theology. Clift co-founded the C. G. Jung Society of Colorado in 1976, and served as its first president. After his retirement from the University of Denver in 1992, Clift was appointed Canon Theologian of the Episcopal Diocese of Colorado and invited to head the Anglican Studies program at St. Thomas Theological Seminary. When St. Thomas closed in 1995, Clift and the Episcopal diocesan bishop negotiated the Anglican Studies program's move to the Methodist Iliff School of Theology, where Clift continued to head the program for another seven years.

== Professional recognition ==
In 2000, Bette Lanning endowed the Wallace B. and Jean Dalby Clift Scholarship Fund at Iliff to provide funds for students enrolled in its Anglican Studies Program. Church Divinity School of the Pacific awarded Clift an honorary doctorate in 2003. Clift served as President of the Standing Committee of the Episcopal Diocese of Colorado from 1989 to 1990 and was Canon Theologian Emeritus of the diocese.

== Publications ==
=== Books ===
- Clift, Wallace (1982). Jung and Christianity: The Challenge of Reconciliation. Crossroad Publishing Company. ISBN 0-8245-0409-7. Australia: ISBN 978-0-85924-243-1.
- Clift, Jean Dalby; Clift, Wallace (1984). Symbols of Transformation in Dreams. Crossroad Publishing Company. ISBN 0-8245-0653-7. Australia: ISBN 978-0-8245-0727-5.
- Clift, Jean Dalby; Clift, Wallace (1988). The Hero Journey in Dreams. Crossroad Publishing Company. ISBN 0-8245-0889-0.
- Clift, Wallace (1990). Journey Into Love: Road Signs Along The Way. Crossroad Publishing Company. ISBN 0-8245-1032-1. Australia: ISBN 978-0-8245-1032-9.
- Clift, Jean Dalby; Clift, Wallace (1996). The Archetype of Pilgrimage: Outer Action With Inner Meaning. Paulist Press. ISBN 0-8091-3599-X. Republished 2004 by Wipf & Stock, ISBN 1-59244-543-8. Australia: ISBN 978-1-59244-543-1.
- Clift, Wallace (2012). How to Make Love and Other Godly Thoughts. CreateSpace. ISBN 978-1479329427.

=== Articles ===
- Clift, Wallace (1966). "A Taize Retreat". St. Andrew's Bulletin. Zurich, Switzerland.
- Clift, Wallace (1974). "The New Hasidism". Network (March).
- Clift, Wallace (1975). "Tillich and Jung: A New Mythology of Salvation?". Iliff Review (Winter).
- Clift, Wallace (1976). "Myth, Symbol and the Church in the Writings of John Knox". Iliff Review (Spring).
- Clift, Wallace (1976). "Symbols of Wholeness in Tillich and Jung". International Journal of Symbology (July).
- Clift, Wallace (1984). "Jung's Notion of Religion". The New Catholic World. 227 (1358).
- Clift, Wallace (1986). "Journal Keeping for Personal Growth". Circuit Rider (February).

=== Encyclopedia entries ===
- Clift, Wallace (1987). "Child"; "Rejuvenation"; "Vierkandt, Alfred"; and "Wundt, Wilhelm" in Encyclopedia of Religion. (Eliade, Mircea, ed.) New York: Macmillan.
- Clift, Jean Dalby; Clift, Wallace (2012). "Symbols of Transformation in Dreams" in Encyclopedia of Psychology and Religion. 2nd ed. (Leeming, D., ed.) Berlin Heidelberg: Springer-Verlag.
