= Pastoral counseling =

Branch of psychotherapy

Pastoral counseling is a branch of counseling in which clergypeople, including ministers, rabbis, priests, and imams, provide psychotherapeutic services and mental health support to practitioners of a given faith. Pastoral counselors often integrate modern psychological theory and methods with traditional religious training in an effort to relieve psychospiritual concerns in addition to the conventional spectrum of counseling services.

== Distinctiveness ==
"What distinguishes pastoral counseling from other forms of counseling and psychotherapy is the role and accountability of the counselor and his or her understanding and expression of the pastoral relationship. Pastoral counselors are representatives of the central images of life and its meaning affirmed by their religious communities. Thus pastoral counseling offers a relationship to that understanding of life and faith. Pastoral counseling uses both psychological and theological resources to deepen its understanding of the pastoral relationship." Membership in several organizations that combine theology and mental health has grown in recent years. Some pastoral counselors have developed special training programs to encourage cooperation between religious professionals and medical professionals on treatment of issues like addiction, since spirituality is an important part of recovery for many people.

== History ==
Pastoral counseling emerged as a distinct discipline in North America during the first half of the twentieth century, when religious organizations began integrating the insights and methods of psychiatry, clinical psychology, and social work into clergy training. In 1925, Richard Cabot, a physician and adjunct professor at Harvard Divinity School, published an article in the Survey Graphic suggesting that every candidate for the ministry receive clinical training for pastoral work similar to the clinical training offered to medical students. In the 1930s, Anton Boisen began a program of placing theological students in supervised contact with people with mental health conditions. In time, many seminaries and other training programs for religious professionals began to include clinical pastoral education as part of clerical training. Also in the 1930s, the minister Norman Vincent Peale and the psychiatrist Smiley Blanton collaborated to form the American Foundation of Religion and Psychiatry, now known as the Blanton-Peale Institute. Today, hundreds of mental health centers with links to specific religious traditions are found across North America. In 1963, the American Association of Pastoral Counselors was founded to provide professional certification for pastoral counselors and pastoral counseling centers. In 2019, AAPC consolidated with ACPE.

== See also ==
- Christian counseling
- Nouthetic counseling
- Pastoral care
