= BakerRipley =

Non-profit organization

- Named after: Alice Graham Baker and Edith Ripley
- Predecessor: Neighborhood Centers, Inc.
- Formation: 17 February 1907; 119 years ago
- Founder: Alice Graham Baker
- Founded at: Houston, Texas
- Merger of: Ripley House
- Legal status: Non-profit
- Purpose: Community development
- Services: Assistance for senior citizens, disaster recovery, education, job placement, and personal finance
- President: Claudia Aguirre
- Board of directors: Gwen Emmett, Chair, and twenty-five others (2018)
- Website: www.bakerripley.org

BakerRipley is a non-profit corporation based in Houston. The organization has also been known as the Houston Settlement Association, Neighborhood Centers, and Neighborhood Centers, Inc. In 1940, the Houston Settlement Association brought the Ripley Foundation into its organization. In 2018, BakerRipley has seventy locations in the Houston region.

== The Ladies' Association ==
BakerRipley was founded in February 1907 by Alice Graham Baker. Baker worked through the Ladies' Club of the First Presbyterian Church of Houston, with allies such as Lavinia Lovett and Katherine Parker. This initial civic engagement led to awareness about Houston's working poor. She studied the settlement movement of England, and its best-known American practitioner, Jane Addams of the Hull House in Chicago. As early as 1902, the Ladies' Association established settlement facilities, in some cases, taking over vacant space in store fronts and abandoned churches. These services included subsidized kindergartens, training for teachers of primary education, and practical classes, such as sewing and vocational training.

== Houston Settlement Association ==
=== Rusk Settlement House ===
One important advocate was Sybil Campbell, a teacher at the Rusk School. Her school was located in Houston's Second Ward, in an industrial area which attracted many immigrants. These immigrants originated from Germany, Ireland, and Russia. Many workers in the neighborhood had no means of providing daytime care for their children. Campbell brought this to the attention of Baker, who convened organizational meetings at her home in early 1907. Her husband, Houston lawyer Captain James A. Baker, assisted her in drafting a constitution for the Houston Settlement Association. Their initial fifteen-member board of directors included Roxalee Smith Andrews, Marian Holt, and Estelle Sharp. They elected Alice Baker as their first president, and Mrs. H. R. Akin as their first vice-president.

The first act of the Houston Settlement Association was taking over the Rusk Elementary kindergarten from the Woman's Club. They provided child care, education, and medical services for the working poor in the area. In the 1910s, a new client base emerged from an influx of immigrants fleeing political instability and violence during the Mexican Revolution. Drawn to Houston for its job opportunities in the oil industry and at the expanded Port of Houston, many of these new immigrants resided in the Second Ward during the 1920s. Rusk Settlement House taught U.S. citizenship in Spanish as well as English literacy to these new Houstonians.

=== Ripley House ===
The Ripley House was named for Daniel and Edith Ripley. After Daniel's death, Edith established the Ripley Foundation, with the mission of helping women and children in Houston. She accepted the legal assistance of Captain James A. Baker, who co-founded the Ripley Foundation as a non-profit corporation with William D. Cleveland and Samuel Maurice McAshan in 1935. Ripley coordinated with Corrine Tsanoff to share resources with the Houston Settlement Association. The Ripley Foundation opened a new facility in an Anglo-enclave of Houston's east end in March 1940. Maurice Sullivan, the design architect for the new building, examined settlement houses in the eastern United States before presenting a plan to the foundation. The Houston Settlement Association moved its administrative offices into Ripley House, while still maintaining the nearby Rusk Settlement House.

== BakerRipley ==
In 2017, the organization changed its name to BakerRipley. This recognizes its founder, Alice Graham Baker, and another one of its leaders from the 20th century, Edith Ripley. In the same year, BakerRipley's seventy centers served a client-base of 500,000, led by its CEO and president, Angela Blanchard. As of 2018, Claudia Aguirre is the president and Angela Blanchard is the president emerita.

In 2019 BakerRipley claimed a client-base of 600,000 served through its sixty centers. The organization announced two summer education programs for Houston-area youths. The Little Leaders program facilitates children aged four through thirteen; the Young Leaders program facilitates teenagers through age eighteen. Both programs are hosted at four different Houston campuses.
