= James A. Baker (born 1857) =

American lawyer & banker (1857–1941)

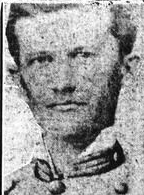
- James A. Baker
- Born: James Addison Baker Jr. January 10, 1857; Huntsville, Texas, US
- Died: August 2, 1941 (aged 84); Houston, Texas, US
- Resting place: Glenwood Cemetery, Houston, Texas
- Other name: Captain James A. Baker
- Occupation: Attorney
- Organization(s): Baker, Botts and Baker
- Known for: Solving the murder of William Marsh Rice and defending his will
- Spouse: Alice Graham (m. January 10, 1883)
- Children: 6, including James A. Baker Jr.
- Parent(s): James A. Baker and Rowena (Crawford) Baker
- Relatives: James A. Baker III (grandson)

James Addison Baker (January 10, 1857 – August 2, 1941) was an American attorney and banker in Houston, Texas. He was born James Addison Baker, Junior, and "Junior" appeared in his signature for many years. After the death of his father in 1897, he started signing his name "Captain James A. Baker," and from that point on people referred to him as Captain Baker.

Baker was the grandfather of President Ronald Reagan's Chief of Staff, James Addison Baker III. Baker's father was a partner of an early antecedent to the Houston-based international law firm, Baker Botts, joining in 1872. Baker became a partner with the firm as well.

As a young attorney, Baker specialized in railroad law as Houston was growing into a regional transportation hub. He developed a business relationship with William Marsh Rice, first as an attorney and later as an overseer of Rice's business interests in several companies. This led to Rice selecting Baker as his personal attorney and a guardian of his education foundation. He defended Rice's estate against a will probated under his second wife's signature. He helped New York authorities unravel the murder conspiracy executed by Rice's personal valet and an attorney, and provided evidence critical to their convictions, all while defending the Rice estate against two major challenges. He served as a trustee for the Rice Institute for five decades.

== Early life ==
Baker was born in Huntsville, Texas, the son of James Addison Baker (1821–1897) and his wife Rowena Crawford Baker (1826–1889). "Jimmie", as he was known in his childhood, grew up in Huntsville with his siblings and lived close to extended family. He had four younger sisters and a brother who survived to adulthood: Minnie, Anna B, Nettie, Ruth, and Robert Lee. Another younger sister and younger brother died during infancy.

In 1872, his father left for Houston to pursue a law partnership there. He first attended a local school, but transferred to a preparatory school for his final year. In 1874, he enrolled at the Texas Military Institute (TMI). The school relocated from Austin to Bastrop, Texas after 1870, where it established a barracks with a capacity for housing 400 students. Baker's dormitory included a stove for heat. He wrote many letters to his family in Houston, though he never confessed to being homesick. He studied classical languages and German while finishing as the top student of mathematics in his freshman class. Later he substituted classics for a curriculum of history, literature, and science. He quit school in 1877 after his family could no longer offer financial support. Though Baker ended his coursework a year early, he passed all of his examinations and earned his degree. He taught at Texas Military Institute the next term.

== Career ==
=== Houston Light Guard ===
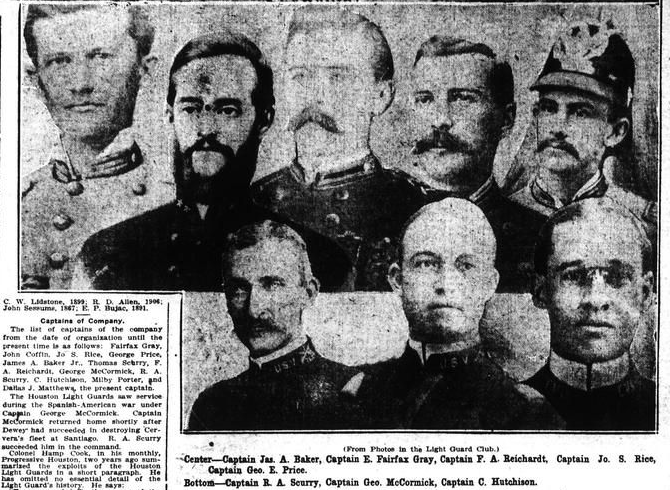
Collage of portraits of Houston Light Guard captains

In 1874, Baker joined the Houston Light Guard, a local militia organized the previous year. One of its members, Jonas Shearn Rice had attended TMI, and sought Baker as a member. The Houston Light Guard was a vehicle for local social networking, as many lawyers and business leaders joined the militia or lent it material support. William Marsh Rice owned fifteen mortgage bonds drawn for the unit, and two of his nephews were members, including another TMI graduate and future mayor of Houston, Horace Baldwin Rice. Local newspaper publisher Allen Charles Gray campaigned for the group and gave it favorable coverage, while his brother Edwin Fairfax Gray, a Civil War veteran, trained and drilled the first wave of recruits. The gray and black uniforms of the militia's early days revealed their allegiances to the Confederacy and the Lost Cause, though the militia replaced these uniforms in the 1880s with a scheme based on blue pants and red coats.

In May 1878, Baker was promoted to first sergeant. He received a promotion to captain in August 1879, after which he led the honor guard presented to President Grant for his visit to Houston in 1880. He resigned his commission and retired from active duty in the early-1880s. For decades, he attended group functions and supported the Light Guard as an advisor, promoter, and fundraiser.

=== Legal practice ===
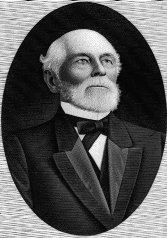
Portrait of William Marsh Rice, Baker's principal client

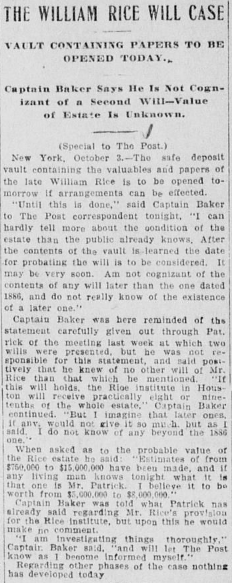
Captain James A. Baker featured in the Houston Daily Post a week after the William Marsh Rice murder

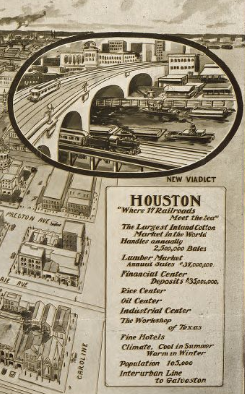
Inset from birdeye's map of Houston, 1912. After 1900, Houston replaced Galveston as the main regional transportation hub.

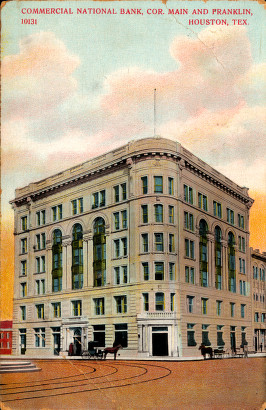
Commercial National Bank Building, Houston, which Baker cofounded

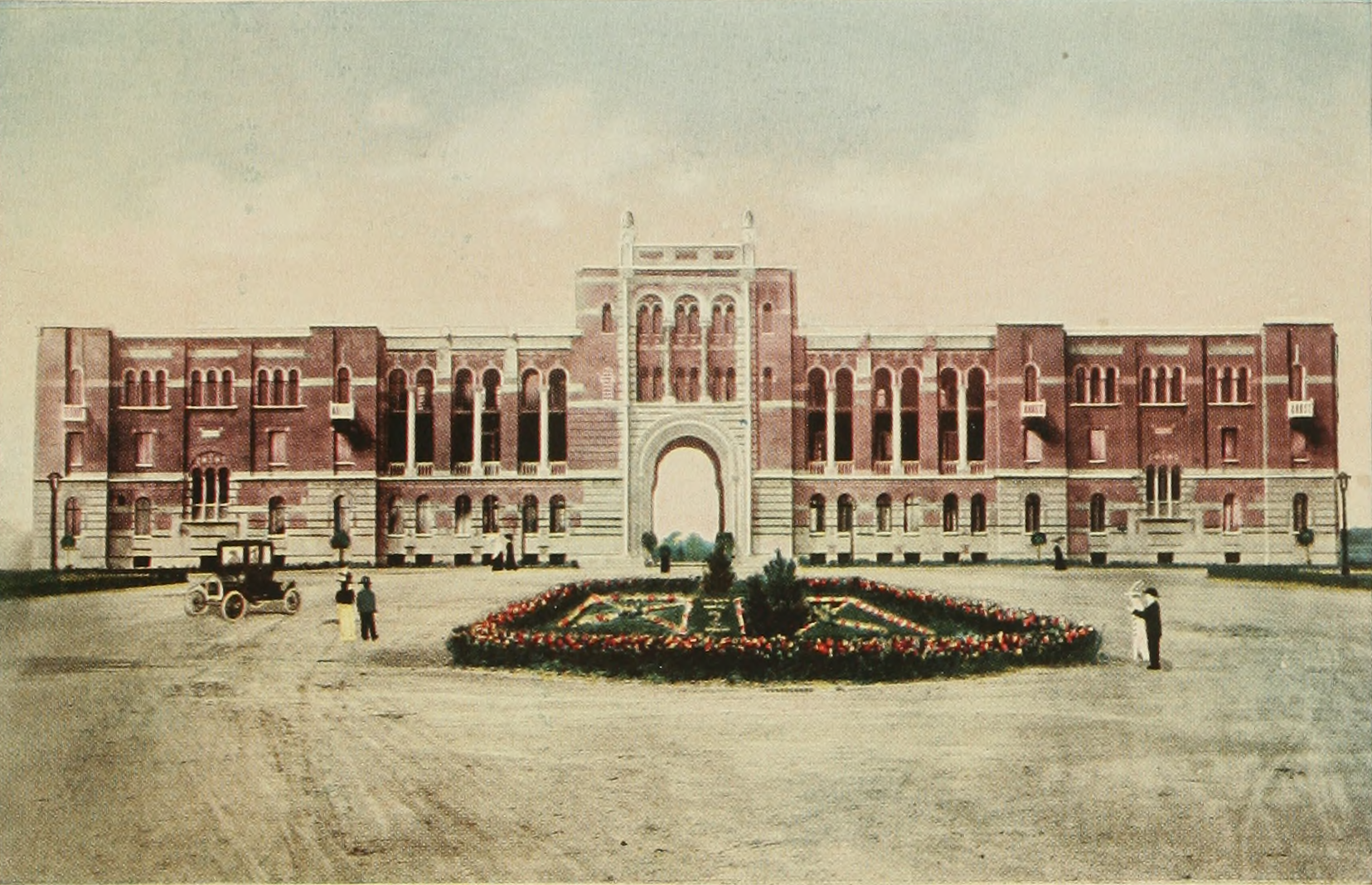
Depiction of Rice Institute in 1913 (now Rice University)

Baker started as an apprentice at Baker & Botts on December 1, 1877, reading law in his spare time and performing general office duties for the firm. He obtained a licence to practice law in Texas two years later, and was promoted to partner of Baker, Botts & Baker on July 1, 1881.

Baker established a niche at the firm by specializing in trial law on behalf of railroad clients, seeking new clients emerging from the growing local economy, and handling the business interests of the firm's top individual client, William Marsh Rice. The native New Englander profited from the Civil War by shipping Texas goods and supplies over the Gulf through Matamoros, Mexico, where wagon caravans provided ground transportation for Texas freight. After the war, Rice amassed an empire that he managed from his primary residence in New York City. Baker's father acted as an advisor and liaison for managing Rice's broad portfolio of assets along the western Gulf coast, though later Baker himself managed Rice's portfolio. In Houston alone, Rice owned large stakes in a bank, a brewer, a brick works, a gas light utility, and a seed oil refiner. Baker's legal work led to several leadership positions within these companies. He was vice-president of the Merchant's & Planters Oil Company, and he served as a director for at least three others. In addition to representing Rice's interests in local companies, Baker gained other executive positions. He acted as vice president of the Texas Rolling Mills from 1887. He was president of the Houston Abstract Company and the Citizens Electric Light & Power Company. He served as director for the Houston Gas Light Company and the Houston National Bank.

By the end of 1889, Baker was able to bring cases to the Supreme Court of Texas. By 1892, Baker started taking over his father's business practice while relinquishing some of his railroad clients to new attorneys. Two years later he had virtually replaced his father at the firm, which by that time was known as Baker, Botts, Baker & Lovett. One of the partners, Walter Browne Botts, died later in 1894, and Baker became the legal guardian of Tom Botts, who was Walter's son and a descendant of one of the firm's founders. Through 1900, Baker was a fifty percent partner in the firm.

During this period, Baker defended Rice's estate when a new will of his late wife surfaced. Elizabeth "Libbie" Baldwin Brown Rice died on July 24, 1896. She had drawn two simple wills in 1888 and 1892. The second of these left most of her estate to her husband, but neither will suggested that she had great personal wealth. Though Texas was a community property state, William and "Libbie" married in 1867 after Rice had already built most of this fortune. Their primary residences were New York City and Dunellen, New Jersey, but they also maintained an apartment at the Capital Hotel in Houston, where they spent many winters. In April 1896, Libbie was in poor health and she sought warmer climate as a remedy, bringing the couple to Houston. She developed a friendship with a local lawyer and his wife, Orren T. and Marian Seward Holt, while also entertaining a niece from Cleveland, Mamie Baldwin Huntington. Libbie suffered a stroke the next month, and she died in Wisconsin two months after. During her illness in Houston, Holt wrote a new will for her, naming himself as sole executor and designating ten percent of the proceeds as his commission, which was witnessed only by two of his in-laws. The 1896 will assumed $2 million in community property, and designated $200,000 to Huntington, and another $150,000 to Huntington's close relations. Rice had not known about any of his wife's wills, but he was so informed by Baker in September. Two weeks later Baker drew a new will for Rice, which bequeathed the bulk of his estate to the foundation for the Institute for the Advancement of Literature, Science, and Art. Along with Judge John Bartine, Baker was an executor. Holt filed Libbie's 1896 will in Harris County on March 22, 1897. Baker and his firm represented Rice. Holt prevailed in the probate hearing as the judge admitted the will and accepted Holt as executor.

Holt filed lawsuits in four counties, asserting Libbie's community property interests in those places. Baker filed an appeal against the probate hearing and lost. He next moved with a counter-suit in federal court, claiming that Holt had no standing to file for the estate since the Rices never established Texas as their residence. The laws of New York should apply, Baker argued, which was not a community property state. The U.S. Circuit Court for the Eastern District of Texas consolidated all of the lawsuits and moved them to federal jurisdiction. Over the next two years, Baker interviewed witnesses to the Rice marriage in Houston and New York in preparation for the impending case. The trial was scheduled for early October.

==== Rice murder ====
On September 23, 1900, William Marsh Rice died at his home in New York City. The Houston Post reported Rice's attorney as Albert T. Patrick, who was reportedly managing Rice's affairs. Patrick, however, was an attorney who pressed a lawsuit challenging the contents of Rice's second wife's will and control over the Rice fortune. Baker and Rice's brother Frederick rushed to New York in order to answer Patrick's claims.

Rice's valet, Charles Jones, sent a telegram to Baker with news of his boss's death on the afternoon of September 24. Baker and Frederick Rice telegraphed contacts in Houston and New York, while requesting that Norman S. Meldrum secure all papers at the deceased man's apartment. Hours later, Baker and Frederick Rice embarked a Southern Pacific train for New York via New Orleans. Baker retrieved telegrams updating the situation in New Orleans; Montgomery, Alabama; and Danville, Virginia. Meldrum reported to Robert Lovett, one of Baker's law partners. Aboard the train, Baker and Frederick Rice hypothesized that Jones and Patrick conspired to defraud the William Marsh Rice estate. The pair arrived at William Marsh Rice's apartment on the morning of September 27. Baker questioned Patrick at length about his relationship with Rice and the 1900 will. He confronted Jones about why he waited nearly a full day to inform Baker's office about Rice's death.

Baker, acting as Rice's personal attorney and as a defender of the interests of his large estate, helped to solve the murder plot. Rice was chloroformed by Jones, on September 23, 1900, in his apartment on Madison Avenue. Patrick posed as Rice's attorney in New York, and was the mastermind behind murdering Rice. Patrick produced what was ostensibly Rice's new will, but it was a forgery produced by Patrick himself. Baker alerted the police about the potentially suspicious motives behind Rice's death.

==== Rice Institute Trust ====
The murder case and litigation over the will, which left a trust fund for the Rice Institute, took seven years to resolve. Baker, as an executor of the previous 1896 will, successfully argued for admitting it into evidence at the trial, a major point in the case. In a case that made national headlines, he helped the estate direct the Rice fortune (over $5 million dollars in 1904) to the founding of the Rice Institute for the Advancement of Letters, Science, and Art, the intended wishes of William Rice. Because of Baker's business acumen, by the time the case ended, the endowment for Rice Institute had doubled to $10 million. Baker was the main representative of the estate and was the founding chairman of the university's board of trustees, where he served from the chartering of Rice in 1891 until his death in 1941. The board assumed control of the assets on April 29, 1904. Rice University's Baker College is named for him.

==== Other legal work ====
Overlapping with the legal work for the Rice estate was Houston's growth in response to the oil strike at Spindletop. Entrepreneurs arriving to Houston imported their ideas and their capital, creating business opportunities and new clients for Baker, Botts, Baker & Lovett. In addition to the partners, the firm employed four attorneys and two clerks.

Baker was president of the Houston Bar Association, and a founder and a board member of the Houston Gas Company. He was the founding president of the Guardian Trust Company, and helped organize the Galveston, Houston and Henderson Railway and the Southwestern Drug Company.

The rise of Baker's legal and business career started after the Rice murder case in 1900 coincided with Houston's increasing importance as a regional transportation and commercial center, replacing Galveston after the devastating 1900 hurricane. In addition, an oil strike at Spindletop in 1901 elevated the Texas Gulf Coast region in terms of national commercial importance. Even though the rich oil field was located near Beaumont, Texas, many oil companies were started in Houston or moved to Houston, and provided a source for many new clients to Baker's law firm.

== Local banking ==
Beginning in 1905, Baker was a director of Union National Bank. He also organized Commercial National Bank. After engineering a merger with South Texas National Bank, he served as president, and later chairman of the board, of South Texas Commercial National Bank (1914–1926).

After the Wall Street Crash of 1929 Baker was instrumental in avoiding the collapse of banks that were sweeping the nation. The president of South Texas Bank wanted to let two weaker Houston banks fail (Public National Bank and Trust Company of Houston) saying that they deserved to do so because management was incompetent. Baker argued that if the two weak banks failed, depositors would withdraw their money from all Houston banks, creating a domino effect that could not be stopped. Baker's reasoning persuaded the other bankers, including Jesse Holman Jones, not to let the other two banks fail. All of the solvent banks were assessed a recovery fee, based on a percentage of their assets and healthy businesses also contributed to the fund. The fund was used to absorb Public National, and with the help of the fund, Union National and Commercial National took over Houston National.

== Non-profits ==
Baker was a member of the Presbyterian Church and the Philosophical Society of Texas.

Baker played a supporting role when his wife Alice founded the Houston Settlement Association in 1907. He assisted her in composing a constitution for the nascent organization. In the 1930s, Baker was one of the incorporators of the Foundation and served as a trustee. He remained involved with the Houston Settlement Association after Alice's death, and he was active with both organizations during their inter-agency collaborations. He advised the San Jacinto Centennial Association, which organized celebrations of Texas history and raised funds for the San Jacinto Monument.

James Baker Jr. continued his father's commitment to Rice University, and Captain Baker's grandson James Baker III, was behind the James Baker Institute. He joined the Rice Board of Trustees in 1993.

== Personal life ==
James Addison Baker married Alice Graham on January 10, 1883, his 26th birthday. They had six children: Frank Graham Baker (born 1883), Alice Graham Baker (1887), James A. Baker Jr. (1892), Walter Browne Baker (1900), Ruth Graham Baker (1904), and Malcolm G. Baker (1906).

During the 1890s, Baker and his wife vacationed with their children in Colorado each year. This family gathering included his sisters Anna B. Thompson and Nettie Duncan, in addition to his brothers-in-law, and his nephews and nieces. In 1898, the Bakers moved into a house at 1416 Main Street, which had been designed by George E. Dickey about a decade earlier. The house featured arches, gables, multiple bays, one of which was topped by a pointed turret. Baker commissioned William Ward Watkin to design a Spanish-Mediterranean house in Broadacres, a new subdivision he developed jointly with his son, James A. Baker Jr.

== Death and legacy ==
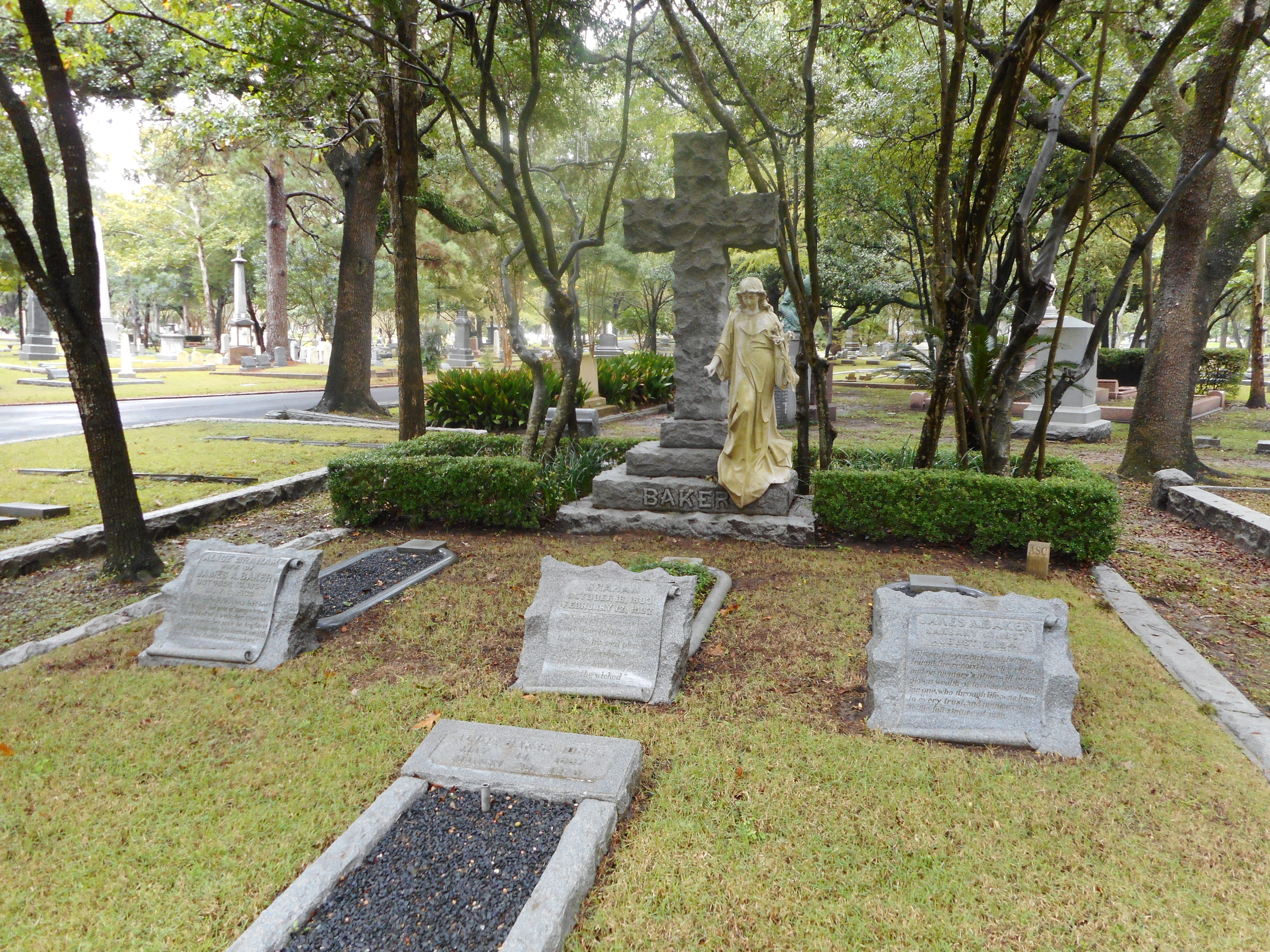
The family gravesite: Alice Baker Jones (foreground), Alice Graham Baker (left), Graham Baker (center), and Captain James A. Baker (right).

Baker died in Houston on August 2, 1941. He was interred at Glenwood Cemetery in Houston. He bequeathed his home, "The Oaks", to Rice Institute (Rice University). Baker died while head of the 100-year-old law firm, Baker, Botts, Andrews, and Wharton.

Baker is the namesake of Baker College, a residential college at Rice University. The Commons of Baker was the main dining hall for the university when it opened in 1912. East Hall (or the "New Wing") and the Commons of Baker were designed and built by Cram, Goodhue, & Ferguson. Baker College was established in 1957, and now includes a library and residential tower named for Baker, and the Baker-Lovett quad.
