= Alice Graham Baker =

Philanthropist and non-profit founder

- Born: Alice Graham; 18 October 1864; Waco, Texas
- Died: 9 May 1932 (aged 67); Houston
- Resting place: Glenwood Cemetery (Houston, Texas)
- Known for: Civic leader, social work, and philanthropy
- Board member of: Houston Settlement Association
- Spouse: James A. Baker (born 1857)
- Children: Frank Graham Baker, Alice Graham Baker, James A. Baker Jr., Walter Baker, Ruth Baker, and Malcolm Baker
- Parent(s): Francis Hughes Graham and Mary Augusta (Wilson) Graham
- Relatives: James Addison Baker III, grandson

Alice Graham Baker (née Graham; October 18, 1864 – May 9, 1932) was an American civic leader, social worker, and philanthropist. She was the founding president of the Houston Settlement Association. She was married to Captain James A. Baker, who collaborated with her in civic ventures. She was the grandmother of James Addison Baker III, former United States Secretary of State and former Secretary of Treasury.

== Family life ==
Alice Graham was born on October 18, 1864, to Francis Hughes and Mary Augusta (Wilson) Graham in Waco, Texas. On January 10, 1883, Alice married James Addison Baker, a Houston attorney in his father's firm, Baker & Botts. The couple resided in Houston, where they grew into a family with four sons and two daughters: Frank, Alice, James Jr., Walter, Ruth, and Malcolm.

== Philanthropy and social work ==
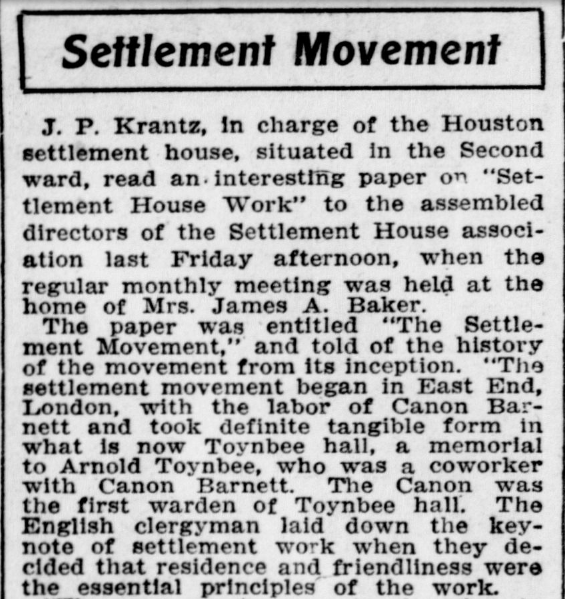
Baker hosted this 1910 lecture about the settlement house movement

Baker started her civic engagement in 1893 at a meeting held at the Shearn Methodist Church in support of the Kezia DePelchin Faith Home. DePelchin sheltered orphaned children, but died in January 1893. Ruth House (wife of Thomas William House Sr.) led this group in founding the DePelchin Faith Home Association. Baker founded the Houston Settlement Association in February 1907. She and Captain Baker composed a constitution for the nascent organization. In the next meeting, the charter members tapped Baker to serve as the first president of the Houston Settlement Association, a post she held until 1918. Based on Jane Addams and the Hull House model, volunteers resided in buildings in disadvantaged areas to help immigrants assimilate. They first established a settlement near Rusk Elementary School in a working-class area in Houston's Second Ward, where many Mexican immigrants were living. The Houston Settlement Association created subsidies for kindergarten and vocational training for adults.

Baker established a standard of accountability, filing a detailed report for the Houston Settlement Association each year. These reports included articulation of the organization's values, goals, and objectives; an explanation of the settlement movement; a listing of the organization's officers, employees, and volunteers; and a financial statement. After 1910, Baker obtained permission from the school board to move the headquarters of the Rusk Settlement House inside the Rusk School, and continued to expand their programs for several years. Meanwhile, the Houston Settlement Association opened the Brackenridge Settlement in 1916.

Baker and her husband worked together to advocate for urban playgrounds, securing some donated land on Louisiana Street from the Rice Institute. She recruited and mentored Corinne Stephenson Tsanoff, who later assumed many of Baker's leadership positions.

== Death and legacy ==
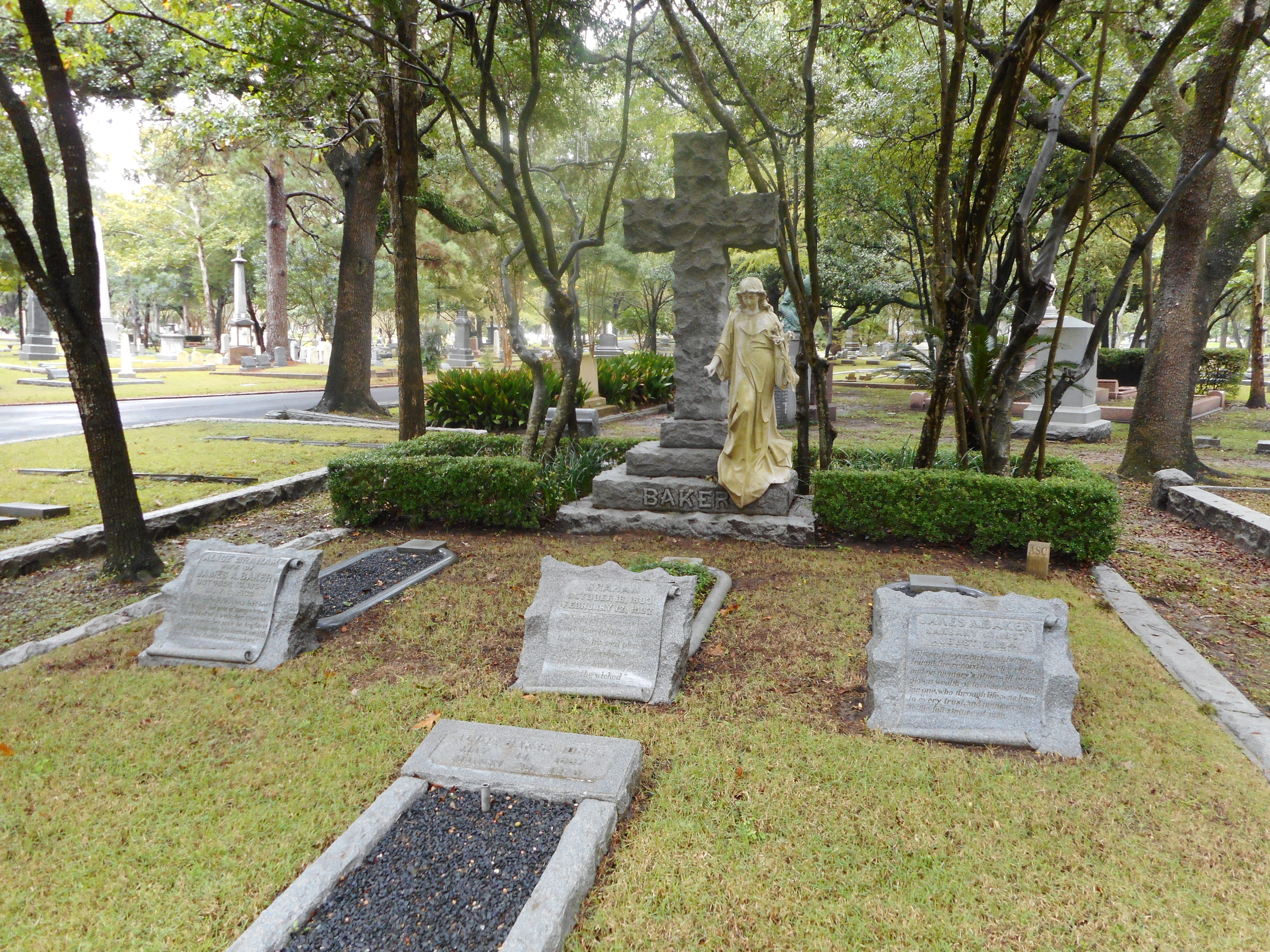
The Baker family gravesite: Alice Baker Jones (foreground), Alice Graham Baker (left), Graham Baker (center), and Captain James A. Baker (right).

Baker died on May 9, 1932, in Houston and was interred at Glenwood Cemetery.

The Houston Settlement Association continued its work after Baker's death. From 1956, it was known as Neighborhood Centers Association of Houston and Harris County, Inc.; and from 2017, it is known as BakerRipley.

== Bibliography ==
- Kirkland, Kate Sayen (2012). Captain James A. Baker of Houston, 1857–1941. College Station: Texas A&M University Press.
