= Robert Denhardt =

American academic (born 1942)

Robert B. Denhardt (born 1942) was a professor of public administration theory and organizational development. He has also worked as a consultant. He was a past president of the American Society for Public Administration.

== Early life and education ==
Denhardt was born in Kentucky in 1942. He completed his Ph.D. at University of Kentucky in 1968.

== Career ==
Denhardt started his career as an assistant professor at the University of Central Florida. He taught at the University of New Orleans, University of Kansas, University of Missouri, University of Colorado, and University of Delaware.

Denhardt was professor and director of the leadership program at the Price School of Public Policy at the University of Southern California. Denhardt began his professional journey as a research assistant at the Center for Developmental Change, University of Kentucky, from 1967 to 1968. At the same time, he was a doctoral research fellow at the Department of Political Science, University of Kentucky. He was assistant professor at Department of Political Science, University of New Orleans, from 1968 to 1971; associate professor at Department of Political Science, University of New Orleans, from 1971 to 1974; associate professor at Department of Political Science, University of Kansas, from 1974 to 1980; professor at Department of Public Administration, University of Missouri-Columbia, from 1980 to 1990; professor, Graduate School of Public Affairs, University of Colorado, from 1990 to 1991; Walter and Betty Boardman Professor of Public Administration and Environmental Policy at the Department of Public Administration, University of Central Florida, from 1991 to 1995.

Denhardt was a past president of the American Society for Public Administration (ASPA), a nationwide organization of academics and practitioners in the field of public administration at all levels of government. He was the founder and first chair of ASPA's National Campaign for Public Service, an effort to assert the dignity and worth of public service across the nation. He was also a member of the National Academy of Public Administration and a Fellow of the Canadian Centre for Management Development. He received the Dwight Waldo Award for lifetime achievement in scholarship from the American Society for Public Administration in 2004.

== Publications ==
Denhardt has published more than 100 journal articles, and 21 books. His books include The Dance of Leadership, The New Public Service, Managing Human Behavior in Public and Nonprofit Organizations, The Pursuit of Significance, In the Shadow of Organization, Theories of Public Organization, Public Administration: An Action Orientation, Executive Leadership in the Public Service, The Revitalization of the Public Service, and Pollution and Public Policy.

His book, "New Public Service: Serving, Not Steering," co-authored by his wife Dr. Janet V. Denhardt, was first published in 2000 is considered one of the seminal works that contributed to the development and popularization of the New Public Service model in the field of public administration. The book is published in four (4) editions, the latest was published in 2015. Their prominent article has the same title "The New Public Service: Serving Rather than Steering" was originally published in Public Administration Review in the year 2000 and was chosen as one of the 75 most influential papers out of more than 3,500 articles published in the said journal since 1940.

== Scholarship ==
Denhardt has advanced the arguments that public organizations are part of the government process; that public and private organizations are similar; and that public administration is part of a larger multidisciplinary perspective.

In Public Administration Review, his book, The Pursuit of Significance (1993), was commended for "filling [a] void in the public administration literature" by demonstrating that "public organizations have been every bit as successful as those in the private sector, often deploying roughly equivalent change strategies".

== Death ==
Denhardt died on March 19, 2025, in Chandler, Arizona.
