= Baker Botts =

American law firm

Baker Botts L.L.P.
- Headquarters: One Shell Plaza; Downtown Houston, Texas, United States
- No. of offices: 12
- No. of attorneys: 725
- Major practice areas: Antitrust, bankruptcy and restructuring, and real estate
- Key people: Danny David (Managing Partner)
- Date founded: 1865
- Company type: Limited liability partnership
- Website: www.bakerbotts.com

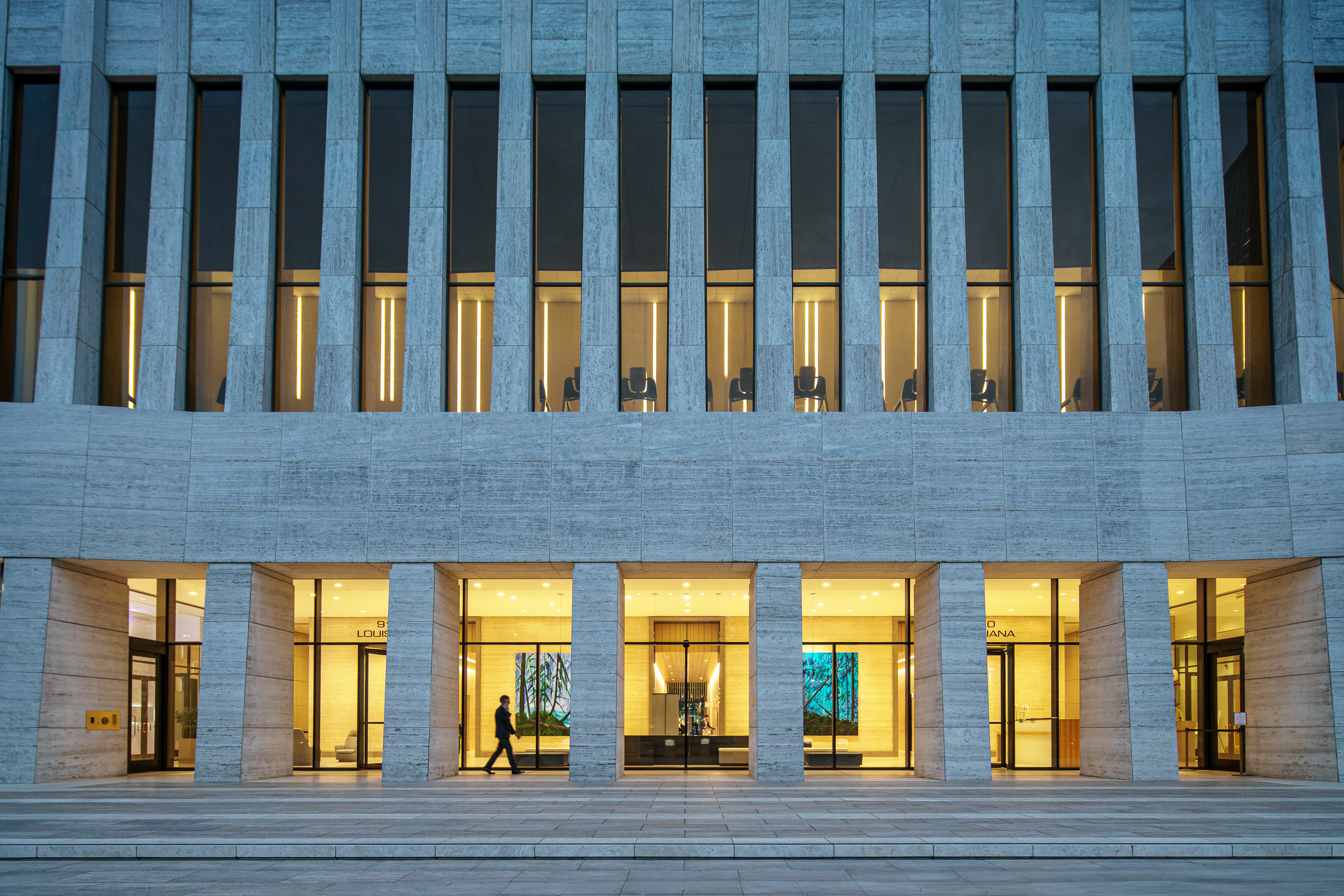
One Shell Plaza is the longtime home of Baker Botts headquarters

Baker Botts L.L.P. is an American law firm headquartered in Houston, Texas at One Shell Plaza. It has approximately 725 lawyers and its practice encompasses corporate law, litigation, intellectual property, and regulatory matters, with a significant presence in the energy and technology sectors.

== History ==
=== 19th century ===
The firm was originally founded as Gray and Botts in 1865, by Peter W. Gray and Walter Browne Botts. In 1872, James Addison Baker joined the firm, and the name was changed to Gray, Botts & Baker. Gray left the partnership in 1874 to join the Supreme Court of Texas, and the two remaining partners, Walter Browne Botts and Judge Baker, renamed the firm Baker & Botts. Judge Baker's son, Captain James A. Baker, joined the firm as a clerk in 1877, a lawyer in 1881, and became a partner in 1887, at which time the name became Baker, Botts, and Baker.

=== 20th century ===
In 1900, Rice was poisoned in his bed by his valet, Charles F. Jones, and his New York City lawyer, Albert T. Patrick. Captain Baker was a witness and helped investigate the murder after Patrick produced a will that gave him control of $5 million in 1904. Baker got the will as evidence in the case, and it was subsequently proved that Patrick had forged Rice's signature on the will he submitted. The case was not settled until 1910, and by that time the estate had grown to almost $10 million. When the intent of Rice's will was finally executed, it led to the establishment of the William Marsh Rice Institute, which is now called Rice University.

Captain Baker's son also joined the firm in 1919, and his classmate and friend, Henry Malcolm Lovett, joined in 1924. Walter H. Walne served as managing partner from 1926 to 1933. James Addison Baker, III, former Chief of Staff in President Ronald Reagan's first administration and United States Secretary of State (a.k.a. James Baker) joined the firm as a senior partner in 1993 after leaving public service. He maintained two offices in Washington, being also affiliated as a partner at the Carlyle Group.

In 1997, the firm acquired Brumbaugh, Graves, Donohue & Raymond, a New York City law firm specializing in intellectual property disputes.

=== 21st century ===
==== Merger with Miller, Cassidy, Larroca & Lewin ====
Miller, Cassidy, Larroca & Lewin (formerly Miller, Cassidy & Evans) was a Washington, D.C.–based boutique law firm specializing in litigation, particularly criminal defense. Among the firm's founding partners and namesakes were Herbert J. "Jack" Miller and John Cassidy, both former United States Department of Justice officials. Miller had led the Criminal Division under Attorney General Robert F. Kennedy. The firm's prominent clients included President Richard Nixon, Senator Edward M. Kennedy, White House Deputy Chief of Staff Michael Deaver, NASCAR, and the American Broadcasting Company (ABC) in its litigation with Food Lion grocery stores. The firm merged with Baker Botts in 2001.

==== Renaming and recent history (2000-present) ====
In 2000, the firm renamed itself Baker Botts. In 2002, Walter J. Smith was elected managing partner of the firm. In 2012, Andrew M. Baker was elected managing partner of the firm. In 2019, John W. Martin, a corporate transactional lawyer based in Palo Alto, became the first non-Texas-based partner to be elected managing partner of the firm. In 2023, Danny David was elected managing partner of the firm.

The firm provided legal support for victims of Hurricane Harvey in 2017 and responded to the COVID crisis with the publication of a COVID-19 Community Resource Guide.

During the late 2010s and early 2020s, the firm grew in its energy, technology, and intellectual practices under managing partner Danny David.

== Rosneft controversy ==
Dutch quality newspaper NRC investigated Baker Botts's representation of Russian energy company Rosneft in a Dutch court case dealing with the Russian state's appropriation of Yukos. The two companies were embroiled in a bitter feud between Vladimir Putin and an opponent of his, Khodorkovsky, the controlling shareholder of Yukos. Khodorkovsky was subsequently jailed, and Rosneft picked up the pieces of Yukos' bankruptcy.

Journalist Joep Dohmen of NRC wrote that Baker Botts helped its client Rosneft forge Armenian court rulings to shore up Rosneft's claims in Dutch courts. NRC, claiming possession of the actual court papers, found that Baker Botts partner Ryan Bull and his Moscow associate Izabella Sarkisyan were co-authors of the verdict in Case 1494, which, according to NRC, was handed to Armenian judge Dremeyan on a USB drive. According to NRC, the text included the Armenian coat of arms. The NRC article has been translated into English. The article stated that Rosneft and Baker Botts denied NRC's allegations. The article also stated that Yukos settled out of court after the Dutch court admitted the proof of these actions.

== Notable partners and employees ==
- Claude Allen, 1991–1995; advisor to President George W. Bush
- Dillon Anderson, National Security Advisor, 1955–1956
- Judge James A. Baker, partner, and father of Captain James A. Baker
- Captain James A. Baker, joined 1881, partner 1887, grandfather of James Addison Baker, III
- James A. Baker III, partner, 1993–present; grandson of Captain James A. Baker; served as White House Chief of Staff, United States Secretary of the Treasury, United States Secretary of State
- Amy Coney Barrett, United States Supreme Court Justice
- George W. Bush, former mail room employee; President of the United States, 2001–2009
- Jean Dalby Clift, former employee, 1952–1957
- Wallace Clift, former employee, 1953–1957
- Christopher "Casey" Reid Cooper, United States district court judge
- Ted Cruz, former employee, 1995; United States Senator, 2013–present
- Jennifer Walker Elrod, former employee, 1994–2002; judge, United States Court of Appeals for the Fifth Circuit
- Peter W. Gray, founder, partner, 1840–1874
- Joe R. Greenhill, former employee, of counsel; Chief Justice of the Supreme Court of Texas, 1972–1982
- James Wesley Hendrix, United States district court judge
- Rebeca Huddle, former partner; Justice of the Supreme Court of Texas, 2020–present
- Robert Jordan, retired partner; United States Ambassador to Saudi Arabia, 2002–2003
- Matthew J. Kacsmaryk, United States district court judge
- Robert Keeton, former employee; judge and law professor
- Jerome H. Kern, former senior partner, founding partner of Wachtell, Lipton, Rosen & Katz, former CEO of Linkshare, Playboy Enterprises, and Colorado Symphony
- Stuart A. Levey, Under Secretary for Terrorism and Financial Intelligence within the United States Department of the Treasury
- Maureen Ohlhausen, former partner, former Commissioner of the Federal Trade Commission 2012–2018 (joined Wilson Sonsini in 2024)
- Thomas R. Phillips, current partner, retired Chief Justice of the Texas Supreme Court 1988–2004
- Evan Young, former partner, Associate Justice of the Texas Supreme Court, 2021–present

=== Miller Cassidy ===
Notable attorneys who worked at Miller Cassidy before its merger with Baker Botts included:

- Jamie Gorelick, Deputy Attorney General of the United States (1994–1997)
- Ketanji Brown Jackson, Associate Justice, Supreme Court of the United States (2022–present)
- Seth P. Waxman, Solicitor General of the United States (1997–2001)
