= Clinical pastoral education =

Clinical pastoral education is education to teach pastoral care, spiritual care, and chaplaincy to clergy and others. Classes of clinical pastoral education, called units, are experiential, typically taking place in healthcare and other settings where students interact with patients and clients as part of their training.

A "unit" of clinical pastoral education is 400 hours of a combination of a minimum 250 hours supervised clinical work and a minimum of 100 hours of theoretical education. The term clinical pastoral education is derived from the fact that the students' education is in a clinical setting and they are learning pastoral care/chaplaincy. Clinical pastoral education has been defined as "experienced-based theological education which promote(s) the integration of personal history, faith tradition, and the behavioral sciences in the practice of spiritual care.

Students learn in small groups with other students and a Certified Educator, such as those credentialed by organizations including ACPE, CPSP, and ICPT in the USA. The training includes a combination of group work, individual conversation, and time spent with patients and clients.

Clinical pastoral education is the primary method of training hospital and hospice chaplains and spiritual care providers in the United States, Canada, Australia and New Zealand. It is both a multicultural and interfaith experience that uses real-life ministry encounters of students to improve the care provided by caregivers.

== Theory ==
An underpinning theory of education that structures clinical pastoral education is the "Action-Reflection" mode of learning. Students typically compose "verbatims" of their pastoral care encounters in which they are invited to reflect upon what occurred and draw insight from these reflections that can be implemented in future pastoral care events.

== History ==
Although the practice of spiritual care has a long tradition in Christianity and to some extent in other faith traditions, the systematic analysis of practice associated with clinical pastoral education had its beginnings in the early 20th century. In 1925, Richard Cabot, a physician and adjunct lecturer at the Harvard Divinity School, published an article in Survey Graphic suggesting that every candidate for ministry receive clinical training for pastoral work similar to the clinical training offered to medical students. In the 1930s, the Reverend Anton Boisen placed theological students at the Chicago Theological Seminary in supervised contact with patients in mental hospitals, a flagship program that later resulted in the forming of the Council for the Clinical Training of Theological Students, which eventually became the Association for Clinical Pastoral Education (ACPE).

== Accrediting bodies ==
In the United States there are currently two organizations who were recognized by the United States Department of Education. ACPE: The Standard for Spiritual Care and Education (formerly known as The Association for Clinical Pastoral Education) was recognized as an accrediting agency for clinical pastoral education programs by the U.S. Department of Education. ACPE educators offer clinical pastoral education at more than 450 locations across the United States, many of which combine onsite and online learning opportunities. In 2024, ACPE chose to withdraw from the renewal process for Department of Education recognition. Clinical Pastoral Education International was accredited in August 2024 by the Distance Education Accrediting Commission, which is recognized by the U.S. Department of Education and the Council for Higher Education Accreditation. There are over two hundred and seventy accredited seminary graduate programs with the Association of Theological Schools in the United States and Canada (ATS) in which some provide specializations in clinical pastoral education.

As of 2026, two clinical pastoral education bodies are affiliates of the Association of Theological Schools in the United States and Canada; they are the ACPE and the World Spiritual Health Organization (WSHO). Clinical Pastoral Education International (CPEI) is an educating body accredited by the Distance Education Accrediting Commission. The US Department of Veterans Affairs recognizes six clinical pastoral education bodies for chaplaincy; they are the Association of Certified Christian Chaplains (ACCC), the Association of Professional Chaplains (APC), National Association of Catholic Chaplains (NACC), Neshama Association of Jewish Chaplains (NAJC), National Association of Veterans Affairs Chaplains (NAVAC), and the Spiritual Care Association (SCA).

In 2023, the APC established an initiative called "the Common Council," as a forum for different "chaplaincy membership groups" that certify and/or offer clinical pastoral education. The "Common Council" includes the ACPE, Association of Religious Endorsing Bodies (AREB), Canadian Association for Spiritual Care, CPEI, CPSP, Islamic Society of North America: Chaplaincy Services, Military Chaplains Association (MCA), Muslim Endorsement Council Inc., NACC, NAVAC, NAJC, National Conference on Ministry to the Armed Forces, National Institute of Business and Industrial Chaplains (NIBIC), Pediatric Chaplains Network (PCN), Presbyterian Federal Chaplains, and the WSHO.
