= James A. Baker (born 1821) =

American attorney and jurist (1821–1897)

Judge James A. Baker
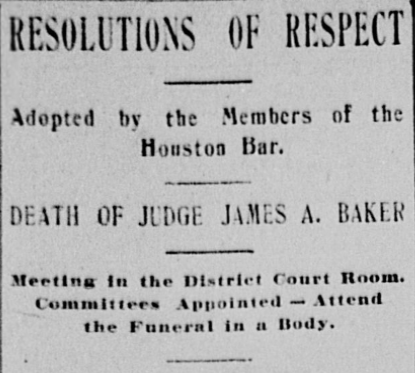
- Death announcement from the Houston Daily Post

State Judge, 7th Judicial District
- In office May 1862 – June 1865
- Preceded by: Edward Albert Palmer
- Succeeded by: Colbert Caldwell

Member of the Texas House of Representatives
- In office 1860–1862

Personal details
- Born: March 3, 1821 Madison County, Alabama
- Died: February 24, 1897 (aged 75) Houston, Texas
- Resting place: Huntsville, Texas
- Citizenship: United States
- Spouse(s): Caroline (Hightower) Baker, Rowena (Crawford) Baker
- Relations: Mary Jane, Julia (sisters); John W., Gabriel M. (brothers)
- Children: James Addison, Mary "Minnie" Susan, Anna Bland, Jeanette, Robert Lee, plus three others died as infants
- Parent(s): Elijah Adam Baker and Jane Saxton Baker
- Profession: Attorney
- Known for: Partner of Baker and Botts

James Addison Baker ("the elder") (March 3, 1821 – February 24, 1897) was a state legislator, state judge, and a lawyer. He is the first of four generations of persons named James Addison Baker, all of whom practiced law. He was known as "Judge Baker" after 1864. His son, also named James A. Baker, was a personal attorney for William Marsh Rice; and his great-grandson is James Baker, former U.S. Secretary of State and White House Chief of Staff.

== Early life ==
James Addison Baker was born on March 3, 1821, to Elijah Adam and Jane Saxton Baker in Madison County, Alabama. Elijah farmed a plantation created from an 1826 land grant in Lauderdale County, Alabama. Elijah and Jane had nine children, with only six surviving childhood: five sons and one daughter.

== Career ==
Baker taught at a local school in 1839. He started a law career in 1841, first as a clerk for a chancery court, then joining the Alabama bar and practicing as a lawyer in 1843.

Baker was wedded to Caroline Hightower in 1849, and the marriage ended in her death in January 1852. Just a few months later Baker moved to Huntsville, Texas, where he practiced law for two decades. His in-laws were already established there, and he was involved in the family's businesses and estates. His four brothers joined him in Huntsville during the 1850s.

In 1860, Baker was elected to represent the Huntsville region in the Texas legislature. He volunteered to serve the Confederacy in the Civil War, reporting for duty in Galveston, but remaining only for six months. He ran in a special election in 1862 to fill an unexpired term in the 7th Texas Judicial District. He won the election in May and presided over his first case in December. The court was located in Houston, but he returned to Huntsville to reside with his family between while the court was out of session. His last case ended on June 1, 1865. The Reconstruction Governor of Texas removed Baker from his post. Baker subsequently relocated to Houston to practice as an attorney in that city, which was renamed Gray, Botts, and Baker to acknowledge its new junior partner. This firm is more recently known as Baker Botts.

While practicing law in Huntsville, Baker specialized in railroad issues. As Houston was emerging as a hub for rail transport, Gray, Botts, and Baker increased its activity in railroad law. The firms' first railroad clients were the Houston and Texas Central and the Missouri–Kansas–Texas Railroad, and it handled matters such as shipper's liability as a common carrier and liquidating land grants. Later the firm represented Jay Gould and the Missouri Pacific Railroad, with Baker as a key member of Gould's legal team. After 1893, the firm by then known as Baker & Botts, was general counsel for the Southern Pacific.

== Personal life ==
Baker married Rowena Crawford on September 27, 1853, in Huntsville. After a first child who died in infancy, Rowena bore four more children: James, "Minnie," and Anna who survived childhood.

== Death and legacy ==
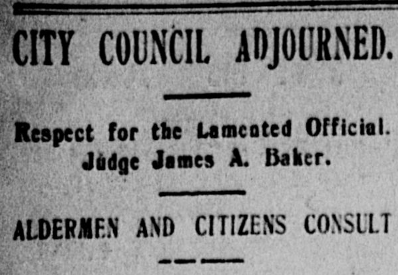
City Council adjourned after Baker's death

Baker died February 24, 1897, and is interred in Huntsville. Baker was a partner for a law firm started in 1840 by Peter Gray, later known as Baker, Botts and Baker, and more recently known as Baker Botts, having celebrated its 175th anniversary in 2015.

Baker was the father of Houston banker, lawyer, and original Rice University trustee James A. Baker (born 1857) and the great-grandfather of the Reagan and G. H. W. Bush administration political figure James A. Baker III.
