= William Ward Watkin =

American architect (1866–1952)

- Born: January 21, 1886; Boston, Massachusetts, US
- Died: June 24, 1952 (aged 66); Houston, Texas, US
- Occupations: Architect, Professor
- Years active: 1910 – 1952
- Notable work: Founder and chair of Architecture Department at Rice University

William Ward Watkin (January 21, 1886 – June 24, 1952) was an architect primarily practicing in Houston, Texas. He was the founder of the Architecture Department of Rice University in 1912, and remained on the Rice faculty until his death. Concurrently, he also designed a number of important projects, mostly in the Houston area.

In addition to his duties at Rice, Watkin designed a large number of structures, many of which are architecturally significant.

== Early life ==
Watkin was born in Boston, Massachusetts, on January 21, 1886. His parents were Fred Ward and Mary Mathilda (née Hancock) Watkin. The family moved to Danville, Pennsylvania, where young William graduated from Danville High School in 1903. He entered the University of Pennsylvania, where he studied architecture with Paul Philippe Cret and earned a B.S. degree in architecture in 1908. After graduating, he spent a year in Europe.

== Career ==
=== Cram, Goodhue & Ferguson ===
Upon returning to the US in 1909, Watkin moved to Boston, Massachusetts, to join the architecture firm of Cram, Goodhue & Ferguson. In 1910, the firm sent him to Houston, Texas, to supervise construction of the newly created Rice Institute (now Rice University).

Watkin's first major assignment was to oversee the construction of a new school in Houston, Texas, named the William Marsh Rice Institute. Watkin had helped prepare the original masterplan drawings following intense correspondence between Ralph Adams Cram, Bertram Goodhue, and President Lovett. The initial complement of structures included the Administration Building (now named Lovett Hall), a power plant and Mechanical Laboratory, and one dormitory with a dining hall, located on 300 acres (120 ha), two miles southwest of downtown on an unpaved Main Street. The cornerstone of the Administration Building was laid in 1911.

Cram, Goodhue & Ferguson sent Watkin to Houston to work on plans for the Rice Institute (now named Rice University), and he was the firm's representative supervisor there.

=== Academic career ===
Edgar Odell Lovett, the President of Rice Institute, offered Watkin a faculty position in architectural engineering when the Institute opened in 1912. Watkin was promoted to assistant professor in 1915 and full professor in 1922.

In this capacity, he would continue to work on newer buildings for the campus and nearby, such as:

- Autry House (1920), the unofficial student center across Main Street.
- Rice Fieldhouse (1920).
- Harry Crothers Wiess House (1920), later purchased by Rice and used as the President's House.
- Chemistry Building (1925), later renamed Keck Hall.
- Robert and Agnes Cohen House (1927), which houses the faculty club.

In 1927, he became a full professor and maintained that rank until his death in 1952.

Watkin later became the head of the architecture department, a position he held until his death.

=== Commercial practice ===
Watkin also conducted a commercial architectural practice in parallel with his academic position. This enabled him to participate in creating a number of notable projects. Most were built in the Houston area, but a few were outside the area. For example, he designed the campus of Texas Tech University and its administration building in Lubbock, Texas.

=== Other significant projects ===
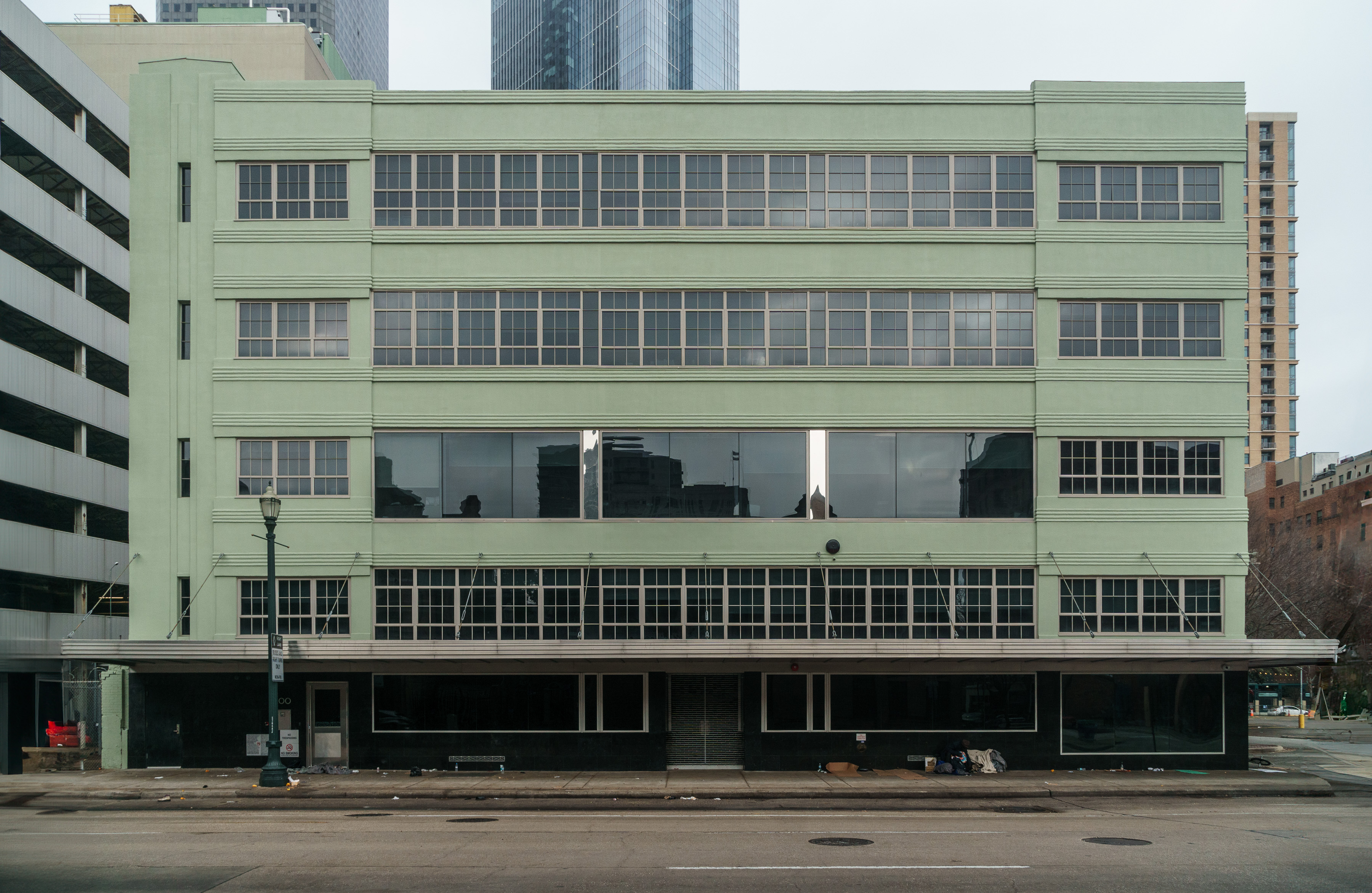
500 Fannin Street (1932, restored 2013)

- Miller Outdoor Theater - The original structure was designed by Watkin in 1922, located in Houston's Hermann Park.
- Houston Public Library - Watkin designed the former main building, which opened in downtown Houston in 1926, and was later renamed the Julia Ideson Building. This building is still in use by the public.
- Museum of Fine Arts, Houston - The original MFAH structure was designed by Watkin in the early 1920s and opened to the public in 1924. Other architects have expanded the building, which has been renamed the Caroline Wiess Law Building.
- Ritz Theater, Houston - The only theater designed by William Ward Watkin and important as Houston's only surviving example of a historic movie palace. Built in 1926 in the neoclassical architectural style. Part of the Main Street/Market Square Historic District is listed on the National Register of Historic Places. Saved from demolition in 1990 through adaptive reuse as a private special events facility, it was renamed The Majestic Metro.
- Wilson Stationery and Printing Company building, 500 Fannin Street, Houston, Texas. 1932.

== Personal life ==
Watkin married Annie Ray Townsend in 1914. They had three children, two daughters and a son. His first wife died in 1928. His second wife was Josephine Cockerel, who died in 1987.

Watkin was a member of the Houston Country Club, the Philosophical Society of Texas, Trinity Episcopal Church (Houston), and the Rice Institute Faculty Club.

== Death and legacy ==
He died and was interred at Forest Park Cemetery in Houston.

Watkin established a traveling architectural fellowship in 1928, which enabled one student per year to travel abroad while studying architecture. The fellowship was renamed for its founder in 1953 and is now the William Ward Watkin Traveling Fellowship.

== Bibliography ==
- Boles, John B. (2007). University Builder: Edgar Odell Lovett and the Founding of the Rice Institute. Baton Rouge: Louisiana University Press. ISBN 978-0-8071-3275-3.
