= John F. Staub =

American architect (1892–1981)

John Fanz Staub
- Born: September 12, 1892; Knoxville, Tennessee, U.S.
- Died: April 13, 1981 (aged 88); Houston, Texas, U.S.
- Occupation: Architect

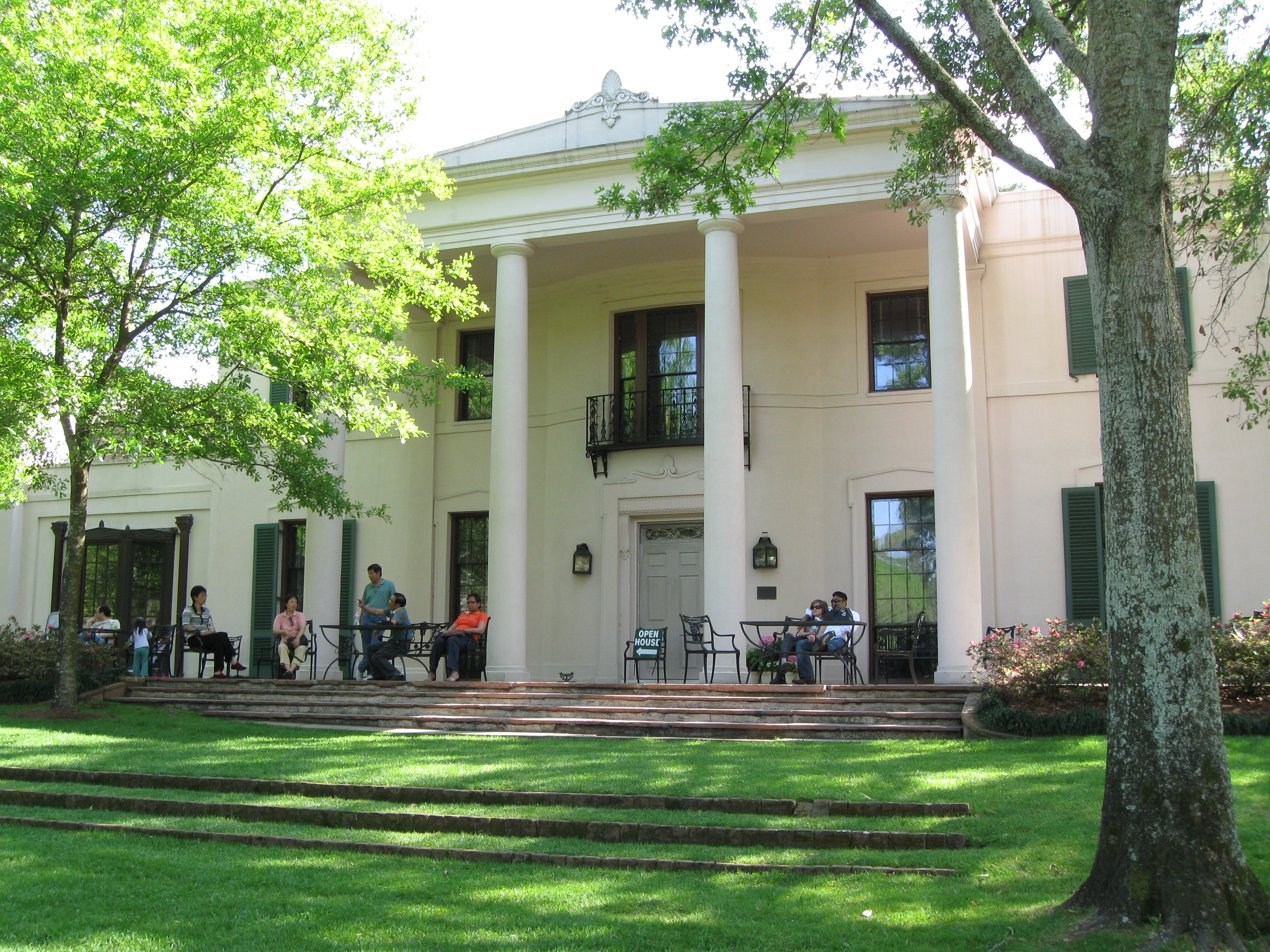
Bayou Bend, Houston, Texas, 1927-28.

John Fanz Staub (September 12, 1892 – April 13, 1981) was an American residential architect who designed numerous traditionally-styled homes and mansions, mostly in Houston, Texas from the 1920s to 1960s. He was a grandson of Peter Staub, who served as U.S. consul to St. Gallen, Switzerland.

== Early life ==
Staub was born on September 12, 1892, in Knoxville, Tennessee, to Frederick and Anna Cornelia (Fanz) Staub.

Staub attended high school in Knoxville. He earned his undergraduate degree at the University of Tennessee where he was a member of the Tennessee Kappa chapter of Sigma Alpha Epsilon. He earned a master's degree in architecture from the Massachusetts Institute of Technology (MIT) in 1916.

== Career ==
After graduating from MIT, Staub worked for Harrie T. Lindeberg, who had established an architectural practice specializing in country houses in New York. After serving for two years in the United States Navy, he returned to architecture. Lindeberg dispatched him in 1921 to Texas in order to supervise three commissioned houses in the Shadyside neighborhood of Houston. Two years later he left Lindeberg to establish his own practice in Houston.

In 1924, Staub founded a regional chapter of the American Institute of Architects. In the 1920s, he specialized in designing single-family houses according to popular European styles, though he later shifted to a preference for Georgian Revival. His first solo commission was the River Oaks Country Club in 1924. He continued his solo practice until 1942, when he cofounded the partnership of Staub and Rather, and worked with Staub, Rather and Howse from 1952 until 1963. Throughout his career, he contributed to the design of 31 houses in River Oaks, though he also designed homes in Broadacres. He also performed residential architecture in Beaumont, Texas, Dallas, Fort Worth, Shreveport, Louisiana, and Memphis, Tennessee. Staub's firms designed buildings for the campuses of the University of Texas, University of Houston, and Rice University. He also designed the parish house at the Palmer Memorial Church.

== Personal life ==
Staub married Madeleine Louise Delabarre on October 4, 1919. They had three children.

== Death ==
Staub died on April 13, 1981. He is buried at Glenwood Cemetery.

== Architectural works ==
- Hopecote, for Albert G. Hope, Knoxville, Tennessee (1924, NRHP 2012)
- River Oaks Country Club, Houston, Texas (1924, demolished)
- House for John W. Parker, Houston, Texas (1925–26, NRHP 1979)
- Heights High School, (Note: Designed in association with architect Louis A. Glover and consulting architect William Ward Watkin.) Houston, Texas (1926–27)
- Bayou Bend for Ima Hogg, Houston, Texas (1927–28, NRHP 1979)
- Remodeling of the Forum of Civics, Houston, Texas (1927, NRHP 1988)
- Parish house, Palmer Memorial Episcopal Church, Houston, Texas (1930)
- House for John S. Mellinger, Houston, Texas (1931, NRHP 2012)
- Remodeling of house for Joseph Verlinde Vandenberge, Victoria, Texas (1932, NRHP 1986)
- Texas Memorial Museum, (Note: Designed in association with consulting architect Paul Philippe Cret.) Austin, Texas (1936–38)
- Lamar High School, (Note: Designed in association with architects Lamar Q. Cato, Kenneth Franzheim, Louis A. Glover and Harry D. Payne.) Houston, Texas (1937)
- House for Andrew Jackson Wray, Houston, Texas (1939, NRHP 1993)
- House for Hugo N. Dixon, Memphis, Tennessee (1940)
- Eugenia Williams House, Knoxville, Tennessee (1937-1941)
- M. D. Anderson Hall, (Note: Designed in association with consulting architect William Ward Watkin.) Rice University, Houston, Texas (1947)
- Abercrombie Engineering Laboratory, Rice University, Houston, Texas (1948, demolished 2021)
- Fondren Library, Rice University, Houston, Texas (1949)
- Huff House, Rice University, Houston, Texas (1949)
- Wiess College, Rice University, Houston, Texas (1949, demolished 2003)
- M. D. Anderson Library, University of Houston, Houston, Texas (1950, altered)
- Batts Hall, Benedict Hall and Mezes Hall, University of Texas at Austin, Austin, Texas (1951)
- Rayzor Hall, Rice University, Houston, Texas (1962)

== Gallery of architectural works ==
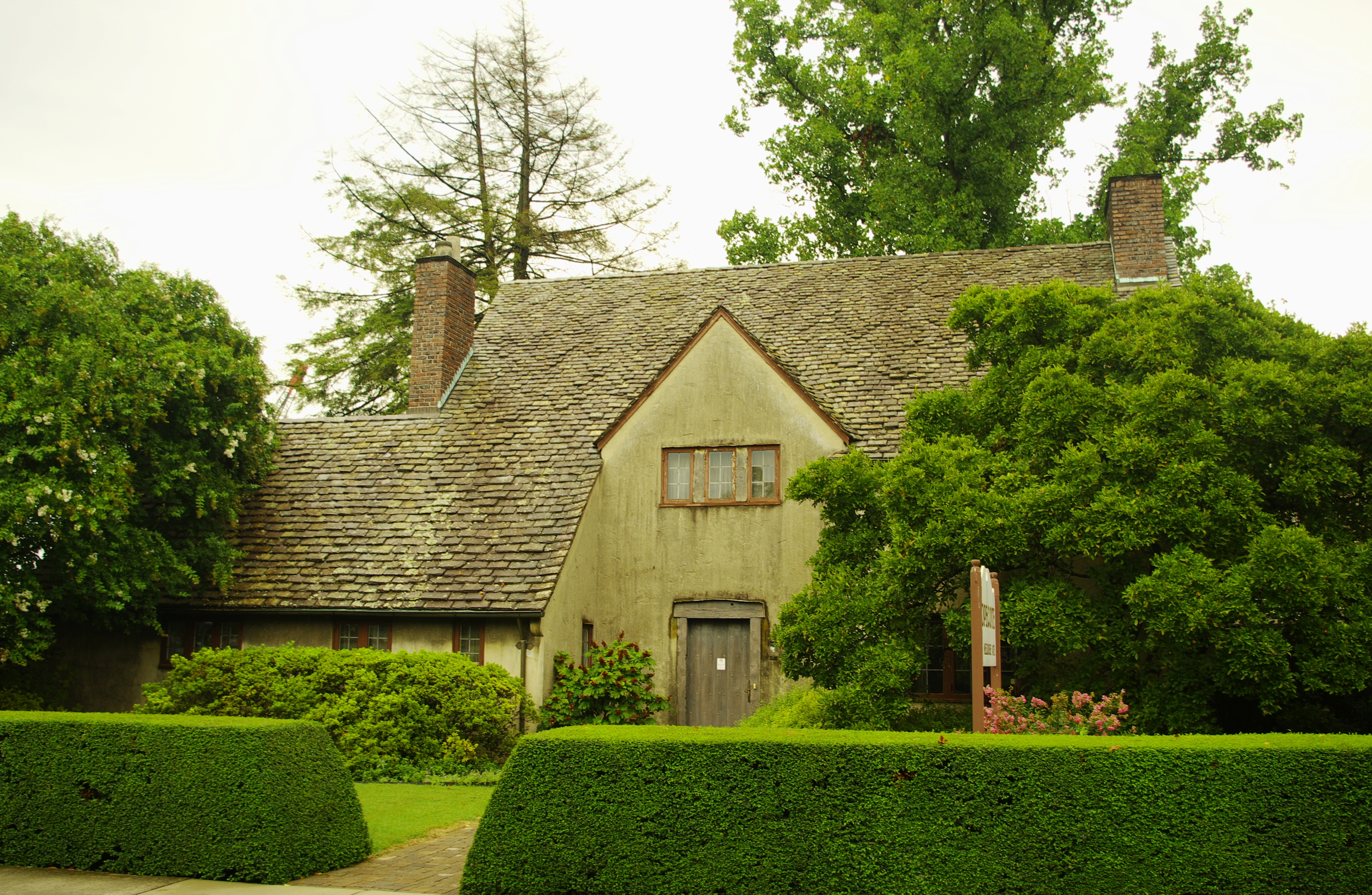
Hopecote, Knoxville, Tennessee, 1924.

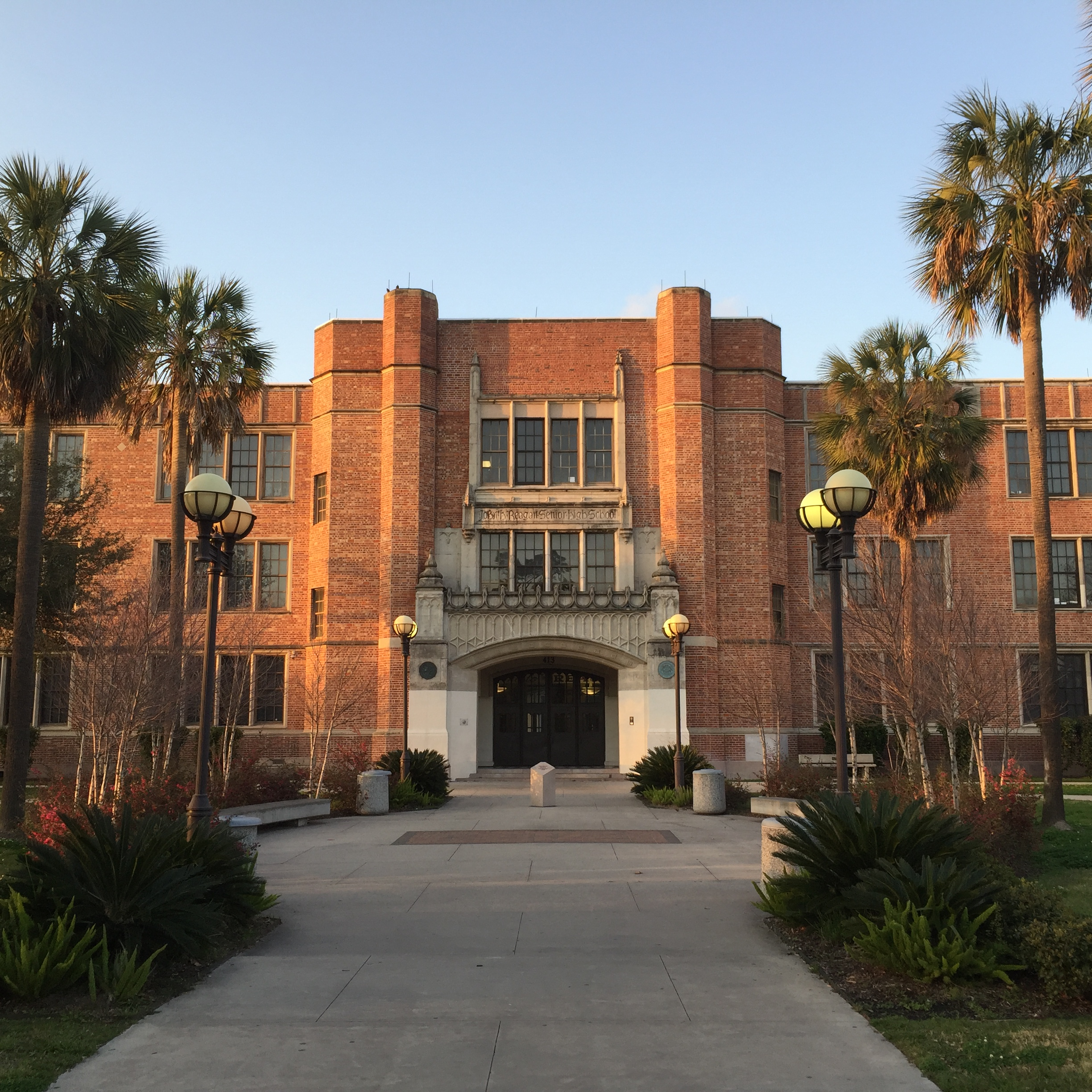
Heights High School, Houston, Texas, 1926-27.

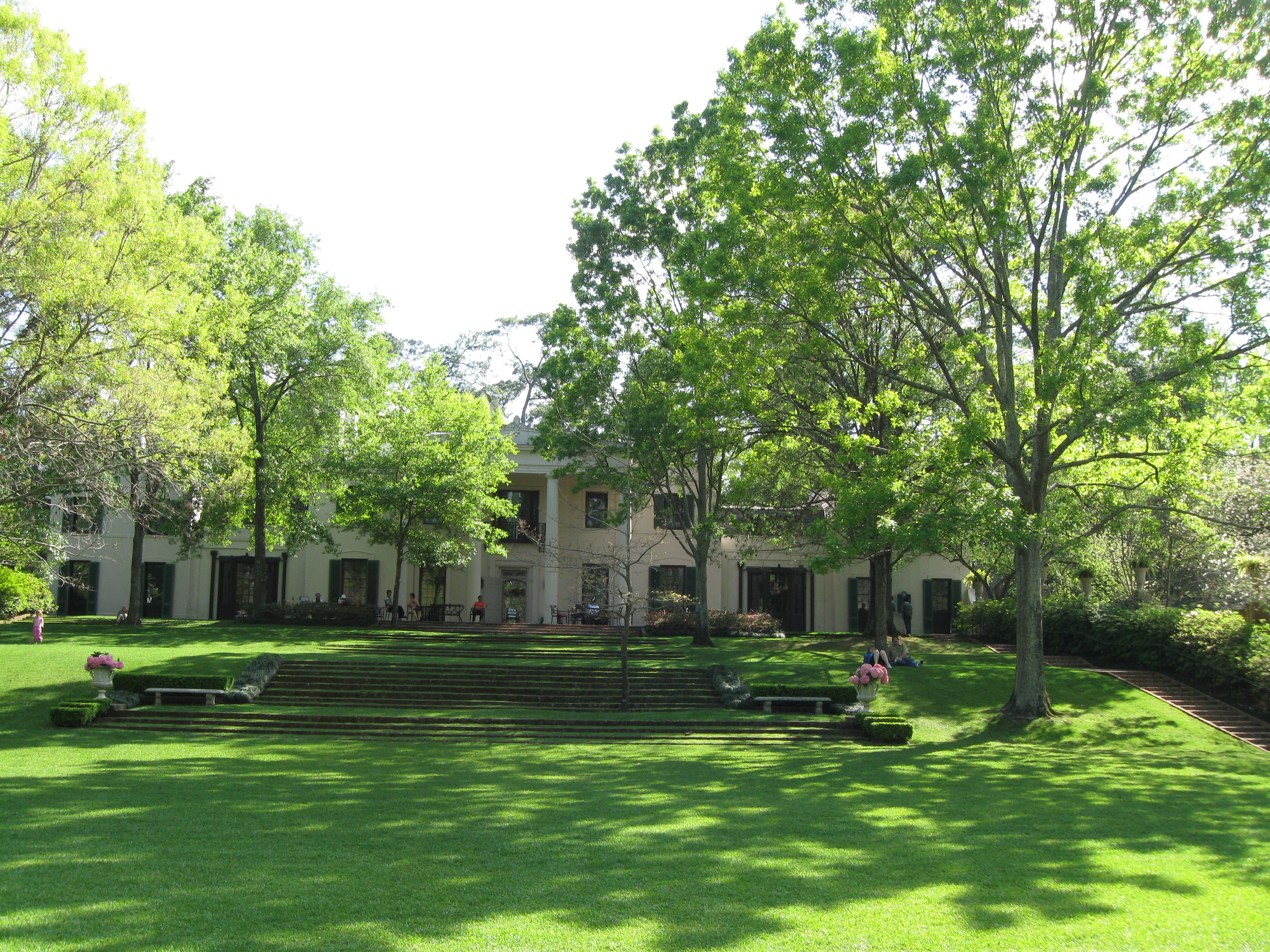
Bayou Bend, Houston, Texas, 1927-28.

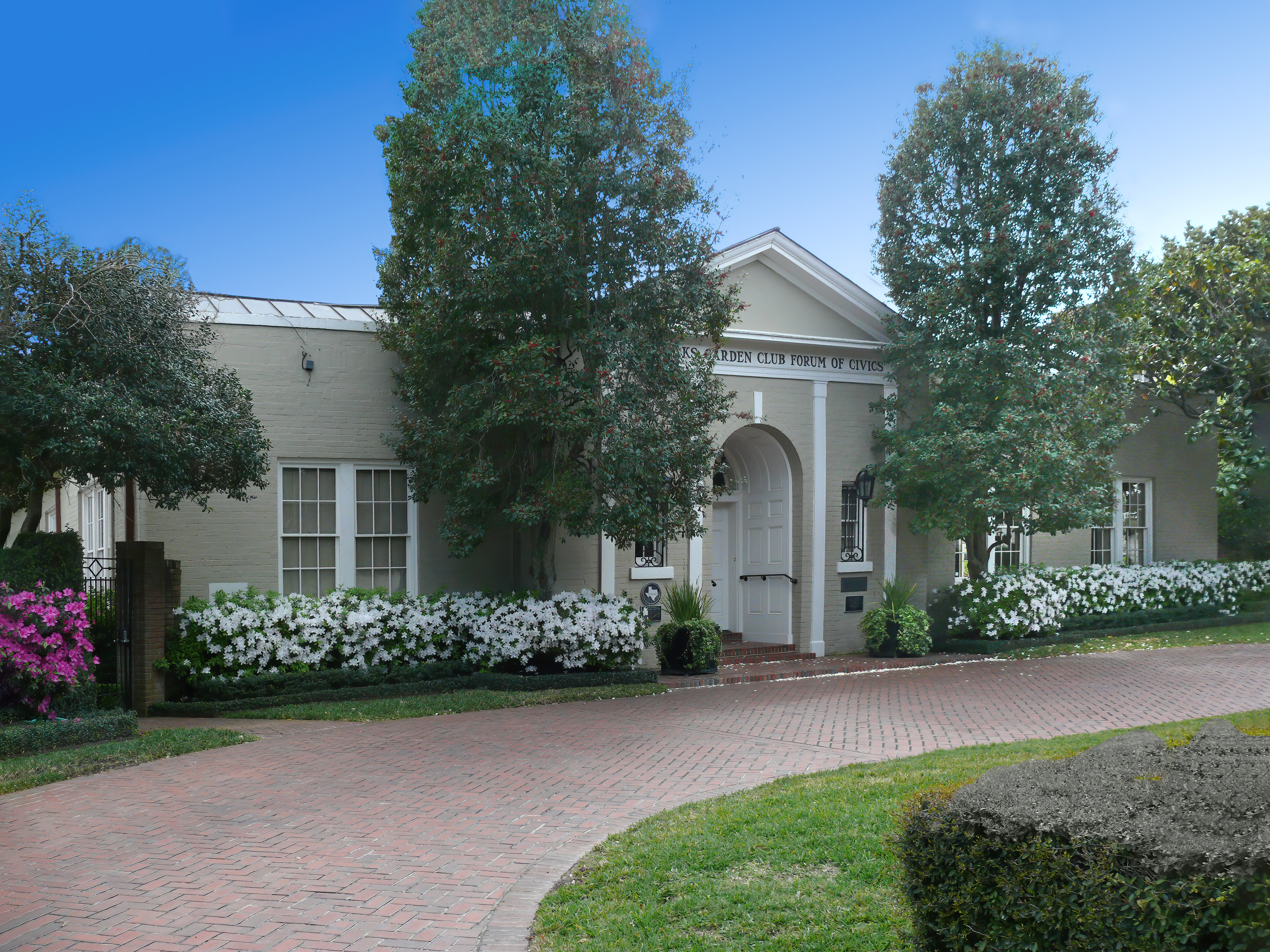
Forum of Civics, Houston, Texas, 1927.

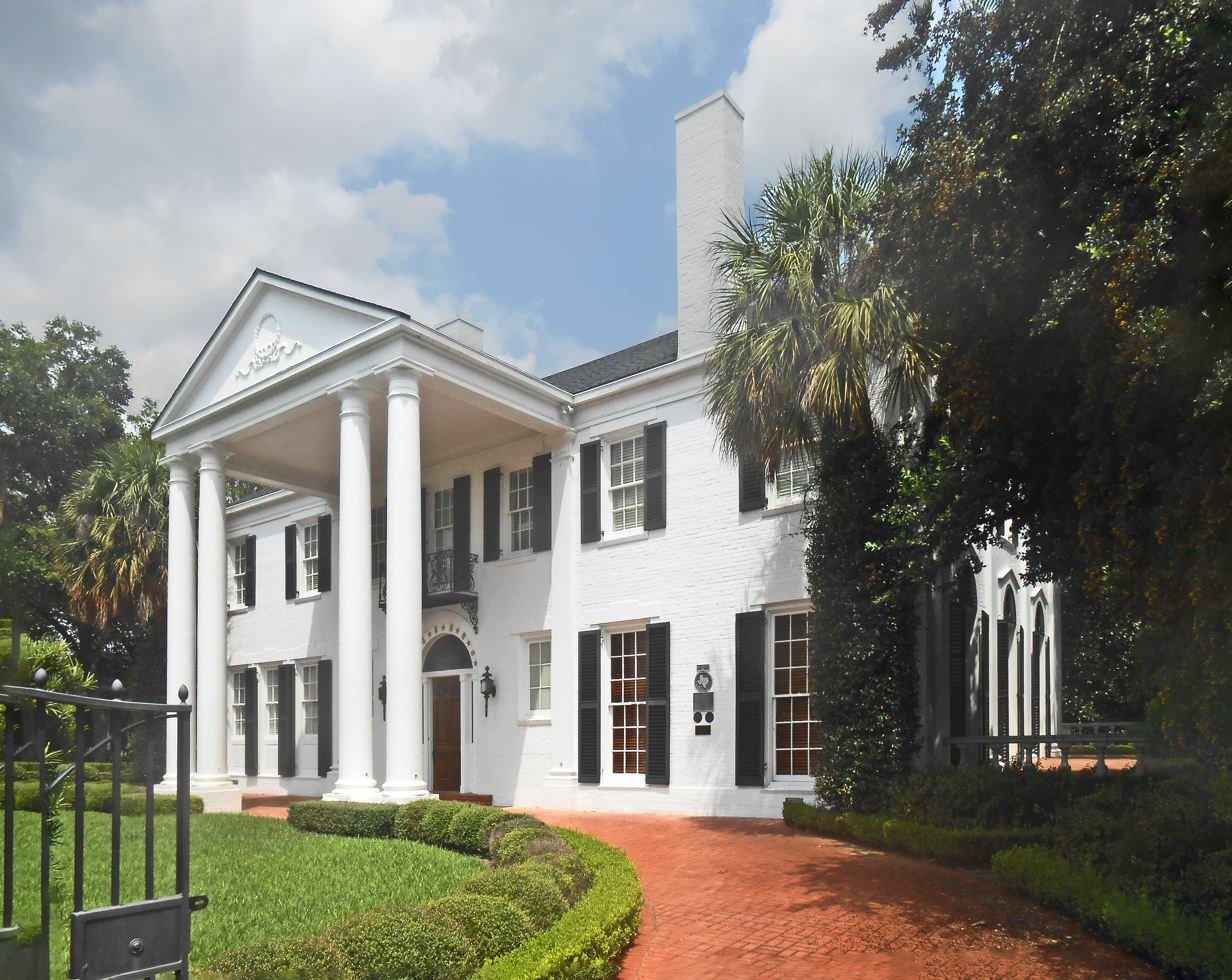
House for Joseph Verlinde Vandenberge, Victoria, Texas, 1932.

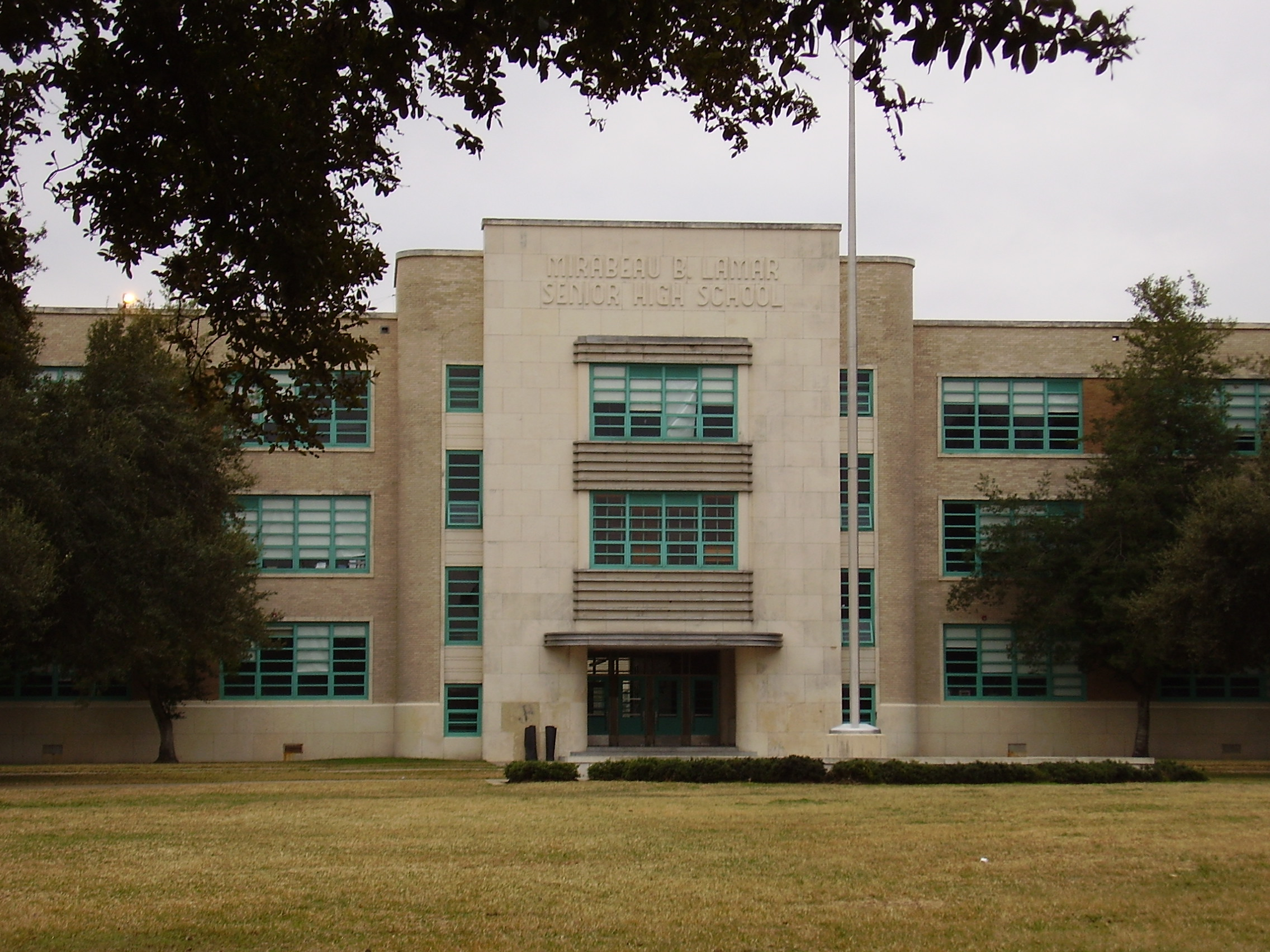
Lamar High School, Houston, Texas, 1937.

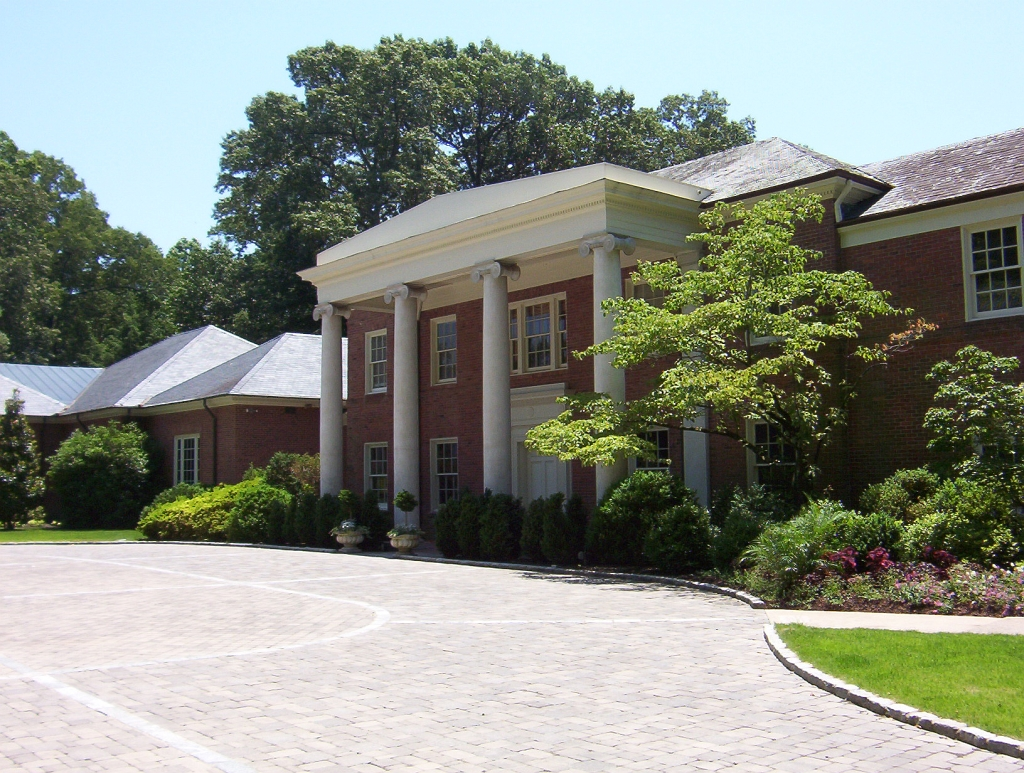
House for Hugo Dixon, Memphis, Tennessee, 1940.

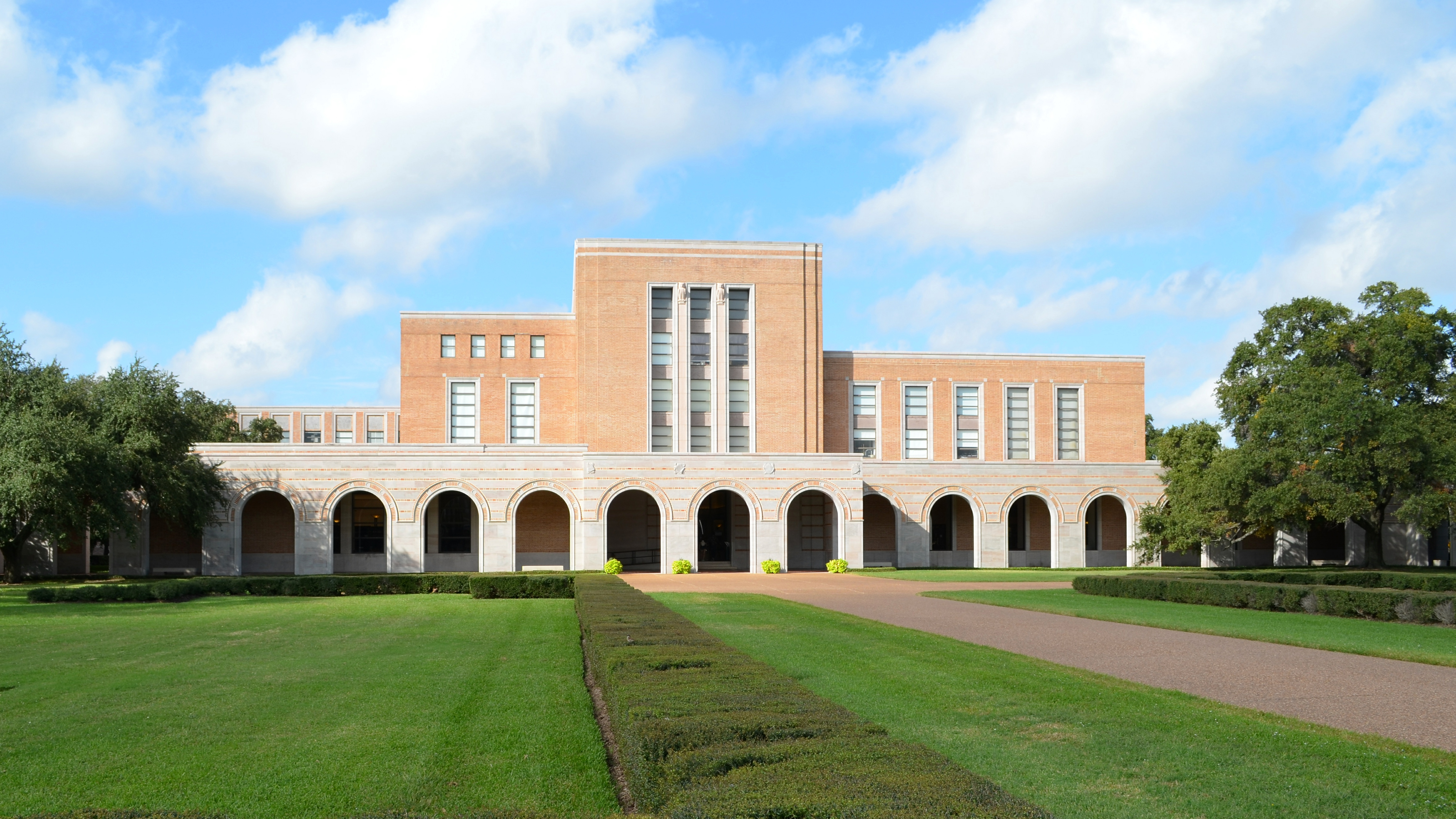
Fondren Library, Rice University, Houston, Texas, 1946-49.

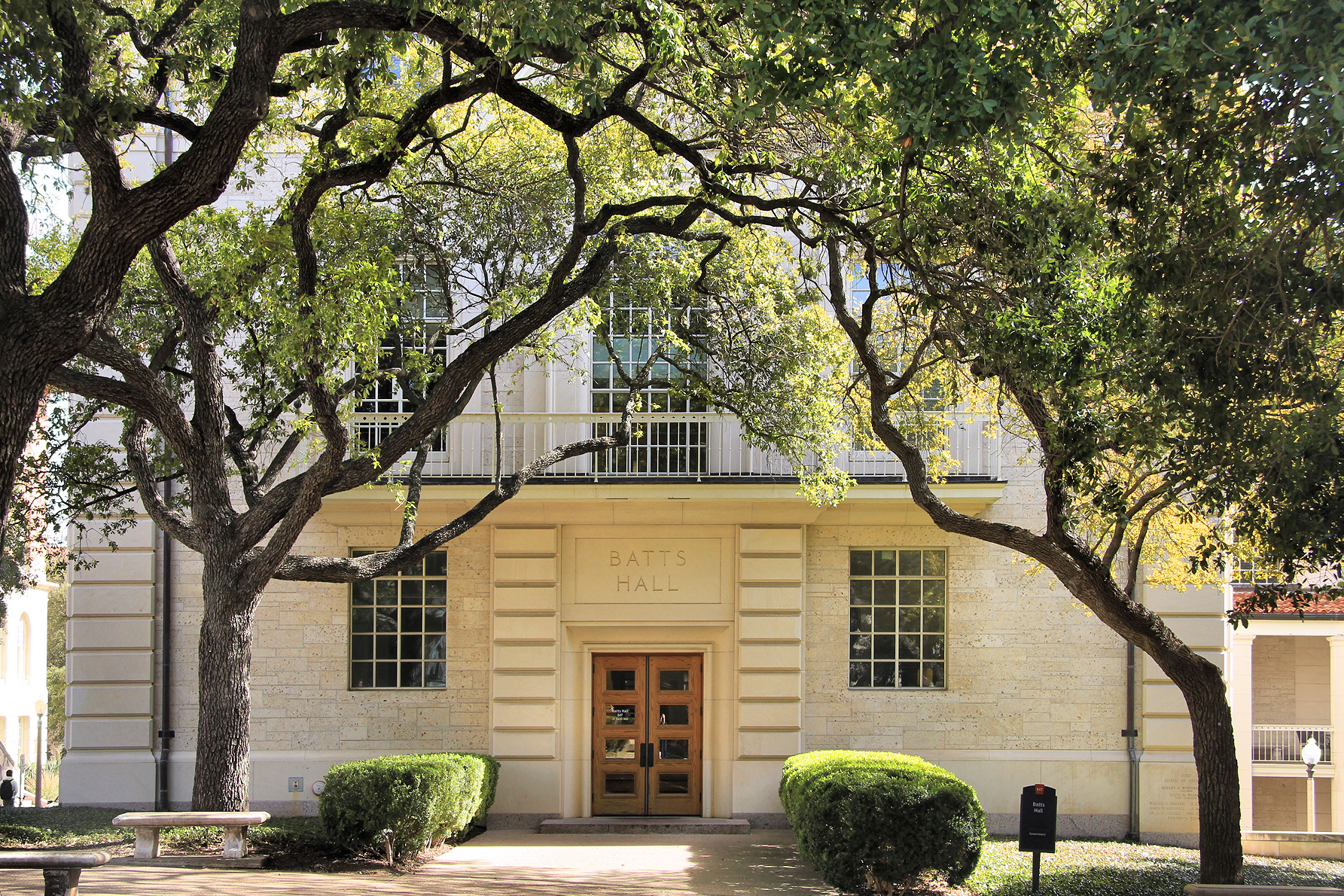
Batts Hall, University of Texas at Austin, Austin, Texas, 1951.
