= Ima Hogg =

American patron of the arts (1882–1975)

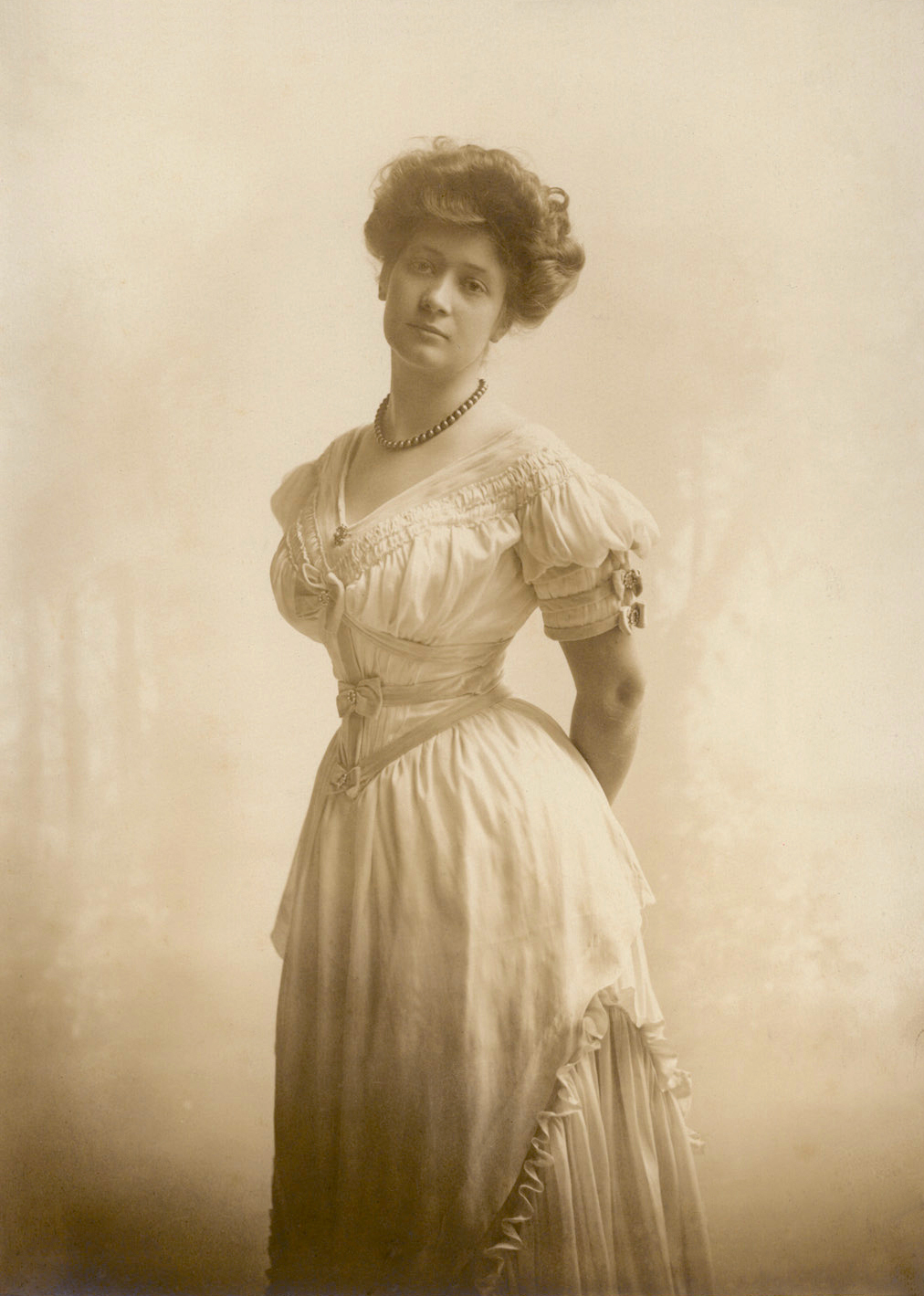
Ima Hogg, c. 1900

Ima Hogg (July 10, 1882 – August 19, 1975), known as "The First Lady of Texas", was an American society leader, socialite, philanthropist, mental health advocate, patron and collector of the arts, and one of the most respected women in Texas during the 20th century. Hogg was an avid art collector, and owned works by Picasso, Klee, and Matisse, among others. Hogg donated hundreds of pieces of artwork to Houston's Museum of Fine Arts and served on a committee to plan the Kennedy Center in Washington, D.C. An enthusiastic collector of early American antiques, she also served on a committee tasked with locating historical furniture for the White House. She restored and refurbished several properties, including the Varner plantation and Bayou Bend, which she later donated to Texas arts and historical institutions who maintain the facilities and their collections today. Hogg received numerous awards and honors, including the Louise E. du Pont Crowninshield Award from the National Trust for Historic Preservation, the Santa Rita Award from the University of Texas System, and an honorary doctorate in fine arts from Southwestern University.

Hogg was the daughter of Sarah Ann "Sallie" Stinson and James Stephen "Big Jim" Hogg, later attorney general and governor of the state. Ima Hogg's first name was taken from The Fate of Marvin, an epic poem written by her uncle Thomas Hogg. She endeavored to downplay her unusual name by signing her first name illegibly and having her stationery printed with "I. Hogg" or "Miss Hogg". Although it was jokingly suggested that Hogg had a sister or sisters, whose names were suggested to be "Hoosa Hogg", "Ura Hogg" or "Wera Hogg", she had only brothers. Hogg's father left public office in 1895, and soon after, her mother was diagnosed with tuberculosis. When Sarah died later that year, Jim Hogg's widowed elder sister moved to Austin to care for the Hogg children. Between 1899 and 1901, Hogg attended the University of Texas at Austin; she then moved to New York City to study piano and music theory for two years. After her father's death in 1906, she traveled to Europe and spent two years studying music under Xaver Scharwenka in Vienna. When she returned to Texas, she established and managed the Houston Symphony Orchestra and served as president of the Symphony Society.

The discovery of oil on her family's cotton plantation made Hogg very wealthy, and she used this income to benefit the people of Texas. In 1929, she founded the Houston Child Guidance Center, which provided counseling for children with mental health problems or diagnoses and their families. Through her brother's will, she established the Hogg Foundation for Mental Health at the University of Texas at Austin in 1940. Hogg successfully ran for a seat on the Houston School Board in 1943, where she worked to remove gender and race as criteria for determining pay and established art education programs for black students. Hogg never married, and died in 1975. The Ima Hogg Foundation was the major beneficiary of her will, and carries on her philanthropic work today. Several annual awards have been established in her name, honoring her efforts to preserve cultural heritage in Texas.

== Name ==
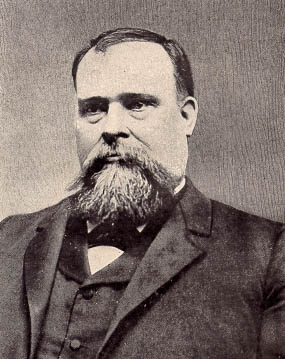
Ima Hogg's father, James Stephen "Jim" Hogg (1851–1906), Governor of Texas

After the birth of his only daughter, Jim Hogg wrote to his brother, "Our cup of joy is now overflowing! We have a daughter of as fine proportions and of as angelic mien as ever gracious nature favor a man with, and her name is Ima!" Ima Hogg had no middle name, which was unusual for the time. Her first name was taken from her uncle Thomas Hogg's epic Civil War poem The Fate of Marvin, which featured two young women named Ima and Leila. According to Virginia Bernhard's biography of Ima Hogg, "there are some who believe that James Stephen Hogg … named his only daughter Ima Hogg to attract the attention of Texas voters" in a year when he was running in a close race for district attorney of the Seventh District in Texas, which he won. Alternatively, correspondence from Jim Hogg indicates he may not have been conscious of the combined effect of his daughter's first and last names.

Ima Hogg later recounted that "my grandfather Stinson lived fifteen miles [24 km] from Mineola and news traveled slowly. When he learned of his granddaughter's name he came trotting to town as fast as he could to protest but it was too late. The christening had taken place, and Ima I was to remain." During her childhood, Hogg's elder brother William often came home from school with a bloody nose, the result of defending, as she later recalled, "my good name." Throughout her adult years, Hogg signed her name in a scrawl that left her first name illegible. Her personal stationery was usually printed "Miss Hogg" or "I. Hogg", and she often had her stationery order placed in her secretary's name to avoid questions. Hogg did not use a nickname until several months before her death when she began calling herself "Imogene." Her last passport was issued to "Ima Imogene Hogg."

Contrary to popular belief, Ima did not have a sister named Ura. Texas legend insists that when Jim Hogg ran for re-election as Texas governor in 1892 he often travelled with Ima and a friend of hers and introduced them as his daughters Ima and Ura. Ima Hogg maintained throughout her life that this never happened. She was frequently forced to dispel the myth; hundreds of people wrote her letters inquiring whether her name was real and if she really had a sister named Ura. The Kansas City Star even invented another sister, Hoosa.

In the early 1930s, Hogg worked on a collection of her father's papers and speeches with his biographer, historian Robert C. Cotner; she became a guardian of his place in history, often writing to clarify or refute articles published about her father. According to Bernhard, "the very fact that Ima had been burdened with a name that made a lifetime of explanations necessary also made her anxious to defend her father from all detractors. By doing so, she defended herself as well, and she did so with considerable skill and unfailing politeness."

Ima Hogg has been the source of "unfortunate name" or "worst baby name" jokes, lists, and contests, including the incorrect assertion that Jim Hogg had named his two daughters "Ima Hogg" and "Ura Hogg." Similar unfortunate baby names according to United States Census records include Ima Pigg, Ima Muskrat, Ima Nut, Ima Hooker, Ima Weiner, Ima Reck, Ima Pain, and Ima Butt.

== Early years ==
Ima Hogg was born in Mineola, Texas, in 1882 to Jim Hogg and Sarah Ann "Sallie" Stinson. She was the second of four children, including brothers William Clifford Hogg (1875–1930), Michael Hogg (1885–1941), and Thomas Elisha Hogg (1887–1949). The Hogg family had long been active in public service. Her great-grandfather, Thomas Hogg, served in the state legislatures of Georgia, Alabama, and Mississippi. Her grandfather, Joseph Lewis Hogg, served in the Congress of the Republic of Texas and helped to write the Texas State Constitution. At the time of her birth, Hogg's father was the district attorney of the Seventh District in Texas. His term expired in 1884, and the family moved to Tyler, where he practiced law. Two years later, Jim Hogg was elected Texas Attorney General and the Hogg family moved to the state capital, Austin, where Ima attended kindergarten. When Jim Hogg was elected the first native-born Governor of Texas four years later, Ima accompanied her mother and elder brother to the swearing-in ceremony and inauguration ball in January 1891, thus witnessing the first inauguration in the newly erected Texas State Capitol. The family moved into the Governor's Mansion. Built in 1855, the building was in poor condition, with cracked walls and dilapidated furnishings. Ima and her siblings were expected to help renovate the building to a liveable state—she was required, among other things, to pry chewing gum from the furniture and door moldings.

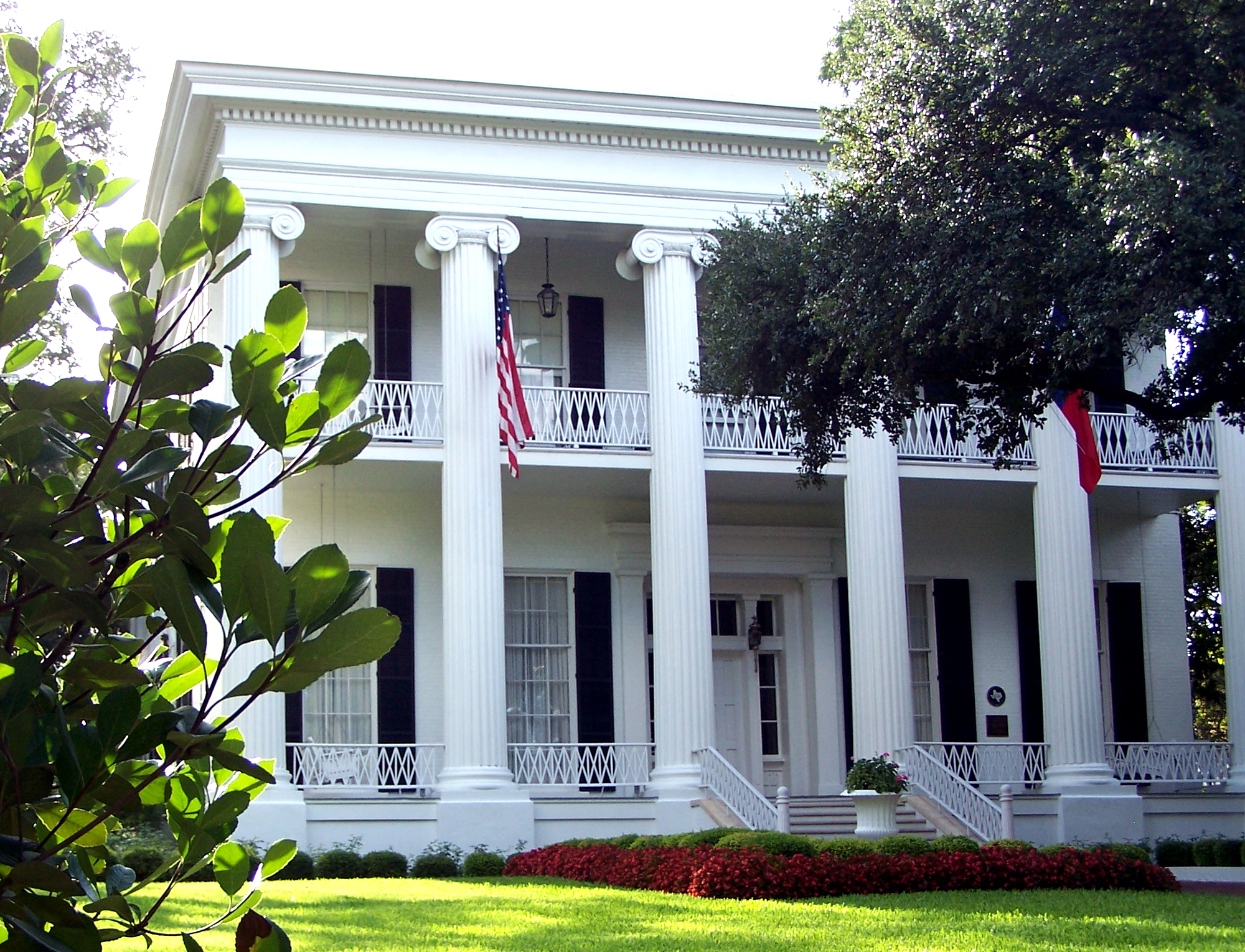
The Hogg family lived in the Texas Governor's Mansion in Austin during Jim Hogg's term as the 20th Governor of Texas.

Hogg and her younger brothers were rambunctious. She recalled that they particularly enjoyed sliding down the banisters in the Governor's Mansion. Hogg's parents allowed this to continue until Thomas cut his chin, after which Jim Hogg nailed tacks along the center of the railing to curb the activity through fear of bloodied posteriors; the holes from the tacks remained visible in the banister for many decades after the Hogg family moved from the home. Hogg's mother attempted to teach her ladylike skills such as needlework, but Hogg claimed that she "never had the patience to succeed". Her mother also encouraged Hogg to learn German. Hogg and her siblings were frequently taken to the Millett Opera House in Austin to enjoy the performances.

The children liked animals, and their menagerie included dogs, cats, birds, raccoons, opossums, rabbits, a Shetland pony and a parrot. The children once used their animals to conduct a circus on the grounds of the Governor's Mansion. Hogg charged each visitor five cents, but was forced to return the money when her father discovered the scheme. In later years, the family added a bear, a horse, a fawn, cockatoos, and two ostriches named Jack and Jill to their collection of animals. In response to a challenge from her brothers, Hogg once mounted one of the ostriches, but was thrown from its back after one of the boys hit it with a slingshot. Ima and her ostriches later became the protagonists of a picture book, Ima & the Great Texas Ostrich Race, by Margaret Olivia McManis and Bruce Dupree.

Her mother never regained her strength after Thomas's birth, and for the remainder of her life was a semi-invalid. Ima accompanied her to several health spas during their years in Austin. In 1895, Sarah was diagnosed with tuberculosis, and on the recommendation of her doctor, she and Ima moved to Colorado, where they lived with Jim Hogg's elder sister, Martha Francis Davis. Sarah Hogg died in Colorado on September 25, 1895.

Davis accompanied the family to Austin and spent several months caring for Hogg and her brothers. Davis, who had lost her husband to tuberculosis and watched her son fight the disease, believed that Hogg must have contracted the disease from her mother. Davis instructed Ima to never marry so as not to pass on the illness. By the end of 1895, the children had been enrolled in a boarding school in San Marcos. The following year, they returned to Austin to live with their father. Although the family employed a housekeeper, Hogg was considered the lady of the house and supervised the housecleaning as well as the education of her younger brothers. In 1898, Hogg accompanied her father to Hawaii, where they met Hawaiian Queen Liliʻuokalani and watched the ceremony that delivered Hawaii to the United States. The two were scheduled to sail to Seattle, but Hogg refused to board the ship. Sobbing, she begged her father to make other arrangements because she "had an awful feeling". He relented and they instead sailed to California, where they learned that their original ship had been lost at sea with no survivors.

== Education and musical interests ==
Music was always present at the Hogg household, and Ima began learning to play the piano at age three. Although her younger brothers attended public school, Ima was enrolled at a private school and received private music lessons. In 1899, she entered the University of Texas at Austin (UT), where her favorite courses were German, Old English, and psychology. She later remarked that "No freshman was ever more immature, more unprepared, more frightened than I." She joined the female social club known as the Valentine Club, and helped to inaugurate the first sorority on the UT campus, Pi Beta Phi. After two years at the university, she moved to New York City to study piano and music theory at the National Conservatory of Music. Although she was not on campus when the Pi Beta Phi chapter was installed in 1902, she became an alumna initiate in 1912 and a year later served as Vice President of the Houston Pi Beta Phi Alumnae Club.

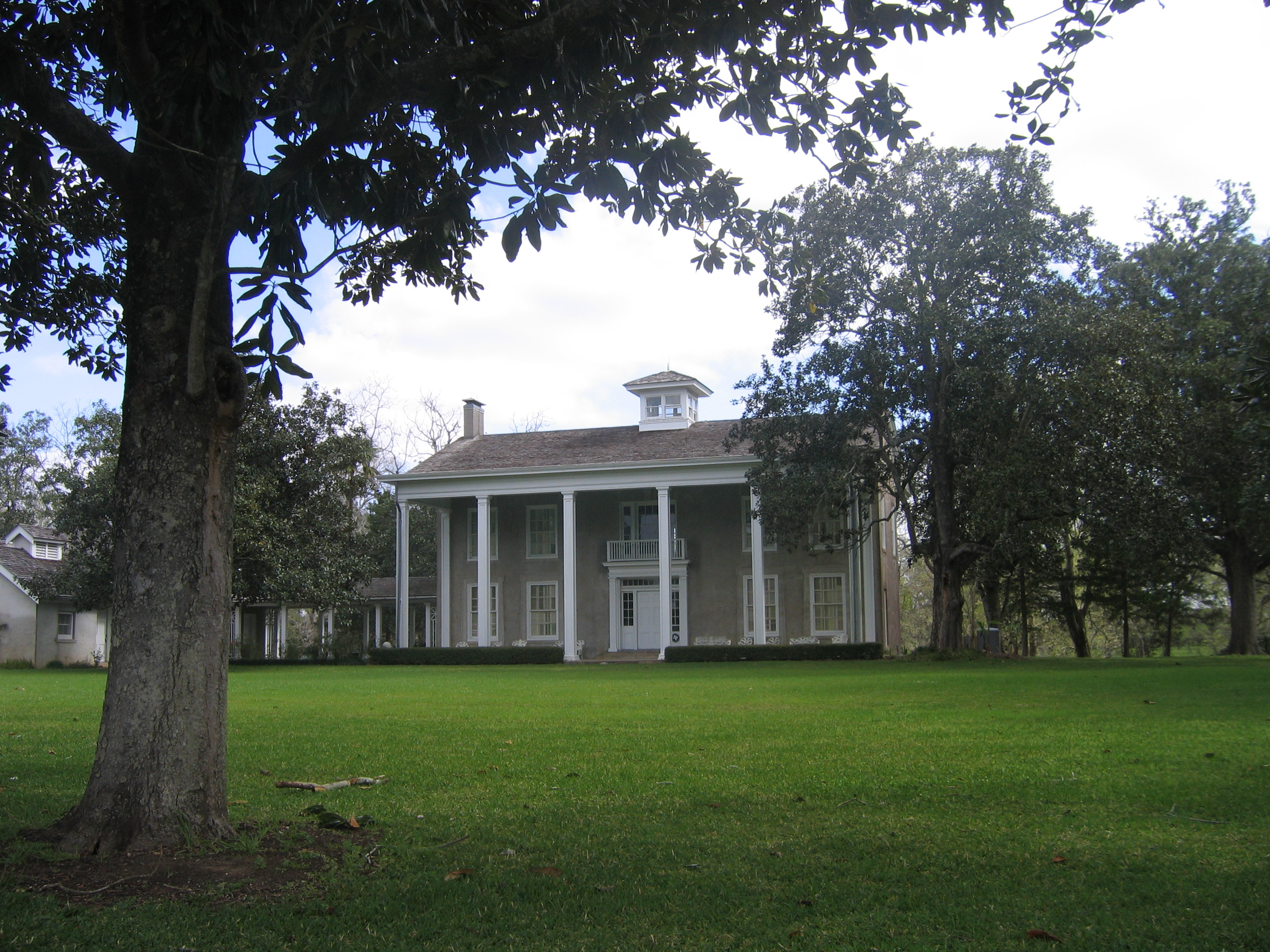
Under Ima Hogg's supervision, a new front entrance was created for her home at the Varner plantation.

Near the turn of the 20th century, Hogg's father began speculating in oil. He purchased 4,100 acres (17 km^{2}) of land near West Columbia in 1901, land that had been part of the Varner plantation. After two years of study in New York City, Ima Hogg returned to Texas, dividing her time between the plantation and Houston, where her father had a law practice. Under her supervision, the house was later remodeled and a portico was added to what had been the back of the house; she made this the new front entrance, orienting the house away from Varner Creek.

On January 26, 1905, Jim Hogg suffered an injury in a train accident. For the next year Ima nursed him as he struggled to regain his health, but on March 3, 1906, she discovered her father dead in his bed. Ima was devastated; to quell her grief, her brother William took her to New York City. During her stay she immersed herself in concerts and museums.

In 1907, she vacationed in Germany, and enjoyed her time so much that she chose to remain in Europe to continue her piano studies. For the next two years she studied music in Vienna under Franz Xaver Scharwenka, pianist to the court of Franz Joseph I of Austria, and in Berlin under Martin Krause. After returning from Europe, Hogg settled in Houston with her brother William. Although the city had a population of about 100,000, it had no museums or parks and no professional theater, music, or ballet groups. Hogg chose to teach music and continued in this vocation for the next nine years. One of her first pupils was Jacques Abram, who later became a concert pianist. By 1913, Hogg had become president of the Girls' Musical Society and was on the entertainment committee of the College Women's Club, which organized a small theater group known as the Green Mask Players. That year, she organized the Houston Symphony Orchestra. Hogg served as the vice-president of the Symphony Society when the first session of the board of directors convened. In 1917 the board of directors requested that she serve as president; she went on to serve 12 terms.

== Philanthropist and community leader ==
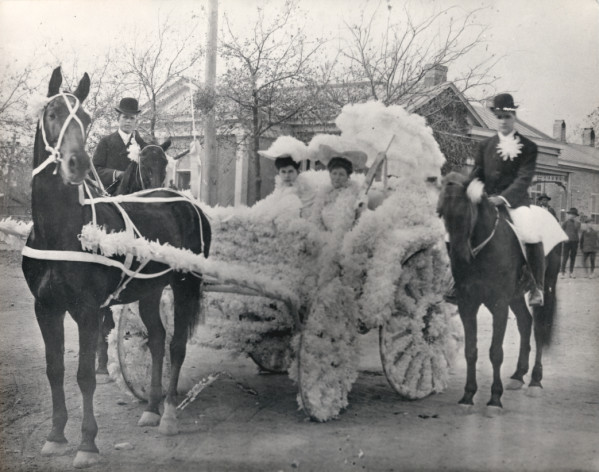
Hogg and an unidentified woman are seated in a horse-drawn carriage, decorated with flowers for the Tekram parade, part of Houston's No-Tsu-Oh festival.

Hogg was affectionately known as "Miss Ima" by those who knew her, and widely considered to be "The First Lady of Texas". When John Connally was Governor of Texas, his wife Nellie declared, "The Governor's wife is usually called the First Lady of the State, but Ima always has been and always will be the First Lady of Texas." In 1957, The New York Times featured prominent Texans in a series about high society, stating: "But one social figure celebrated throughout the state and even beyond its border is Miss Ima Hogg. She is now about 80 but still a civic beacon of Houston."

After their father's death in 1906, Hogg and her brothers tried to sell the Varner plantation, but a provision in his will specified that the land be kept for 15 years. On January 15, 1918, oil was found on the Varner plantation. A second strike the following year provided oil income amounting to $225,000 a month (equivalent to $4.2 million a month in 2025) shared among the four siblings. According to Hogg biographer Gwendolyn Cone Neely, the Hoggs did not believe that the oil money was rightfully theirs, as it had come from the land and not hard work, and they were determined to use it for the good of Texas.

Hogg founded the Houston Child Guidance Center in 1929 to provide counseling for disturbed children and their families. Hogg was convinced that if children's emotional and mental problems were treated, more serious illness could be prevented in adults. Her interest in mental health came from her father, who had read widely on mental health issues; during his terms as governor, Ima had often accompanied him on visits to state institutions, including charity hospitals and asylums for the mentally ill. She furthered her knowledge of the field while she was a student at UT, taking several courses in psychology. Ima was convinced that her youngest brother, Tom, would have benefited from similar intervention, as he had reacted badly after their mother's death and as an adult was "restless, impulsive, and alarmingly careless with money". Although her ideas on mental health would be considered mainstream today, in 1929 they were pioneering. In 1972, she told the Houston Chronicle that, of all her activities, she had derived most pleasure from her role in establishing the Houston Child Guidance Center.

Hogg had previously suffered from mental health problems. In late 1918, she fell ill, probably from severe depression. She consulted with Dr. Francis Xavier Dercum, a specialist in the treatment of nervous and mental diseases, who treated her for the next three years. She was hospitalized for more than a year, and spent a further three years convalescing, primarily in Philadelphia, Pennsylvania. By the summer of 1923 Hogg was fully recovered, but she permanently discarded her dream of being a concert pianist, ostensibly because of weakness after her illness.

Hogg joined her elder brother William on a vacation in Germany in 1930. During their visit, he suffered a gallbladder attack and died on September 12, 1930, after emergency surgery. Ima brought her brother's body back to the United States. His will bequeathed $2.5 million to UT; his desire was that it be used alongside money donated by his sister for "far-reaching benefit to the people of Texas". Legal challenges tied up the grant until 1939, when the university received $1.8 million. In 1940, after discussion with her brother Michael—the executor of the will—Hogg used the money to establish the Hogg Foundation for Mental Health at the University of Texas at Austin.

The San Antonio Express reported in 1939 that the funds granted to the Hogg Foundation for Mental Health would be used to establish mental hygiene clinics and conduct lectures and teacher training courses across Texas, for mental health research, and to survey mental hygiene conditions in Texas. On the entry of the United States into World War II, the Foundation researched methods to prevent mentally unsuitable candidates from enlisting in the military, and provided counseling to those traumatized by the war. After the war, the Foundation expanded its educational and philanthropic focus, providing mental health care to the poor and the aged. The Foundation awards annual scholarships to individuals pursuing a Master's degree in Social Work.

In 1943, Hogg decided to run for a seat on the Houston School Board so that the board would include two female members. Hogg won with 4,350 votes, more than 1,000 ahead of the runner-up. During her term, she worked to remove gender and race as criteria for determining pay. She championed a visiting teacher program for children with emotional problems and began art education programs in the schools for black students. Hogg declined to run for a second term.

=== Furniture and art collector ===
Hogg and her brothers were avid art collectors; she owned a large collection, including Native American art and works by Picasso, Chagall, Matisse and Modigliani. Her interest in collecting began during her convalescence in Philadelphia. Her first purchase, in 1922, was a Spanish foot chair or Queen Anne maple chair with carved feet. She researched the early American furniture market extensively, personally visiting Luke Vincent Lockwood, the author of the standard work on the topic, for more information. At the time, Hogg was one of a small number of people who believed that American antiques had value—by contrast, most collectors concentrated on furniture built in Europe. Other collectors soon saw the value in early American pieces. Hogg remained one of the few collectors not located on the East Coast. As her collection grew, she was often asked to loan pieces for exhibit in New England; Hogg always refused, stating "they've got plenty of these things up there".

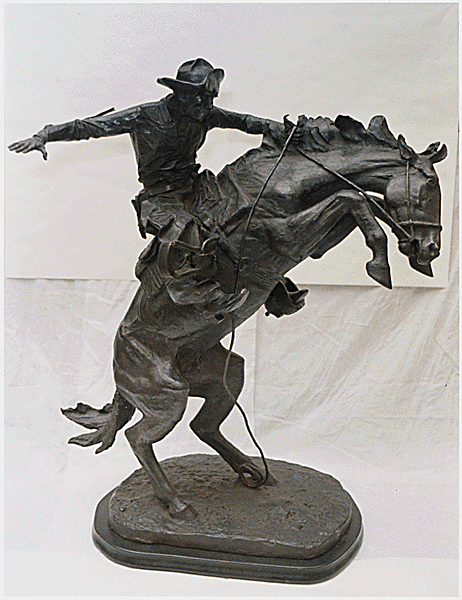
Ima Hogg donated works she inherited from her brothers to Houston's Museum of Fine Arts, including one of the limited editions of Bronco Buster by Frederic Remington.

In the 1920s, Hogg's brothers began to develop a new elite neighborhood, which they called River Oaks, which at that time was on the outskirts of Houston. For their home, the Hoggs chose the largest lot, 14.5 acres (5.9 ha). Ima worked closely with architect John Staub to design a house that would show off the art the family had purchased. William and Ima moved into the house, which she christened Bayou Bend, in 1928. In 1939, when she restored her estate along American lines, she donated more than 100 works on paper to Houston's Museum of Fine Arts (MFAH), including works by Cézanne, Sargent, Picasso, and Klee. Following the death of her brother Michael in 1941, she donated his collection of Frederic Remington works to the museum. Consisting of 53 oil paintings, 10 watercolors, and one bronze, it is known as the Hogg Brothers Collection, and is "one of the most important groupings of Western paintings on display in an American museum", according to Hogg biographer Neely. Hogg donated her collection of Native American art to MFAH in 1944, including 168 pieces of pottery, 95 pieces of jewelry, and 81 paintings.

In 1960, she was appointed by President Eisenhower to serve on a committee to plan the National Cultural Center, now called the Kennedy Center, in Washington, D.C. In 1961, Jacqueline Kennedy named Hogg to the 18-member advisory committee to work with the Fine Arts Committee in seeking historical furniture for the White House.

=== Restorations ===
Although Hogg spent little time at the Varner plantation after Bayou Bend was constructed, she continued to purchase art and antique furniture on its behalf. In the 1950s, she restored the plantation, and each room was given a different theme from Texas history: colonial times, the Confederacy, Napoleonic times (1818), and the Mexican–American War. One room was dedicated to her father, and contained his desk and chair as well as his collection of walking sticks. She donated the property to the state, and it was dedicated as the Varner–Hogg Plantation State Historical Site in 1958, the 107th anniversary of Jim Hogg's birth.

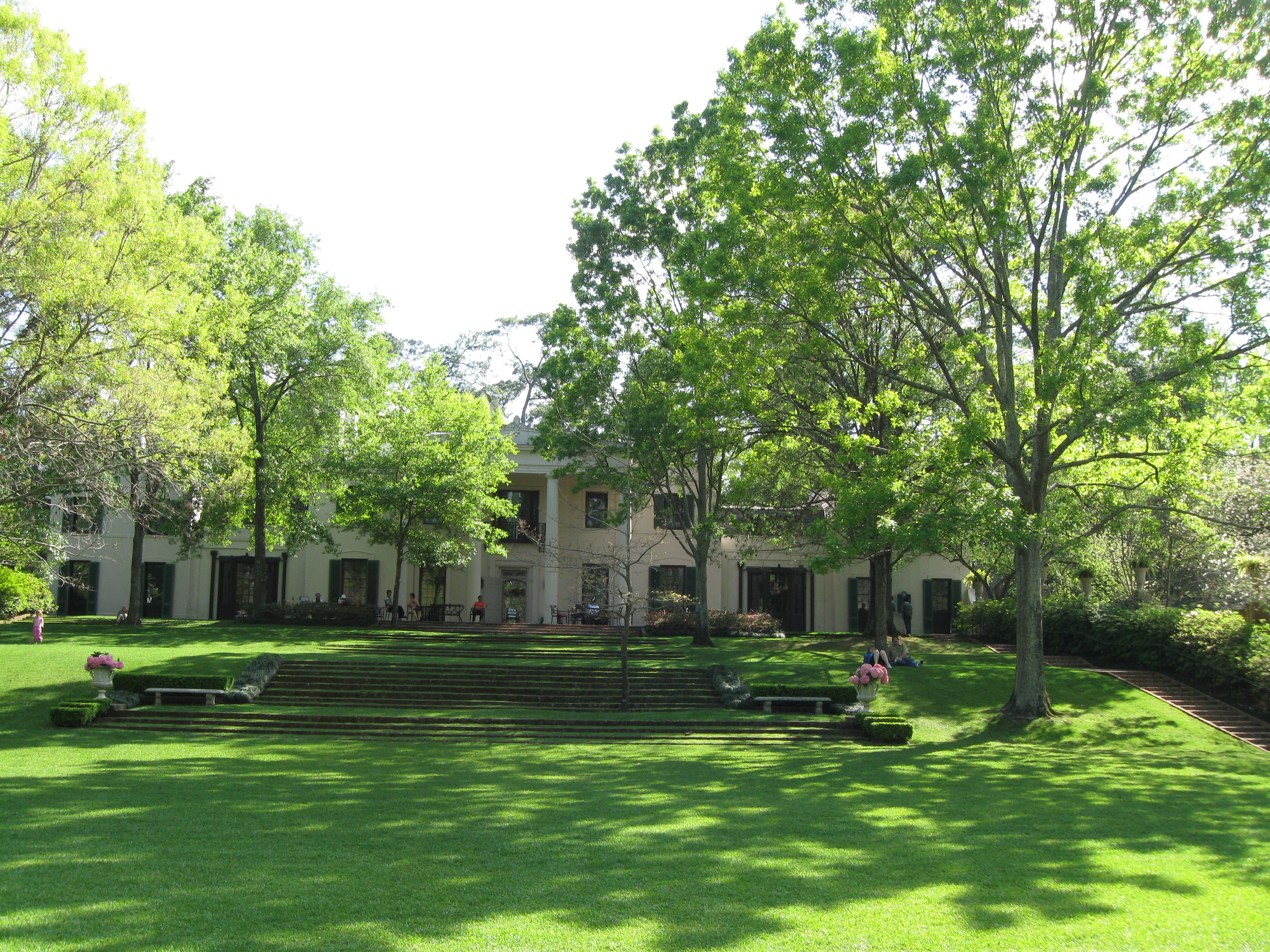
Ima Hogg helped to design Bayou Bend, which is now a museum operated by the Houston's Museum of Fine Arts.

As the Varner–Hogg restoration wound to a halt, Hogg refocused her attention on her Houston home, Bayou Bend, which housed some of her personal collection of antiques and artwork. The New York Times described her "superb Early American furniture" collection in 1953, and she had a large collection of Americana and colonial Mexican decorative arts, some of which are still in the house. In the late 1950s she said: "I had been collecting American furniture. I collected, and collected, and collected, until I had so much of it I didn't know what to do with it. I decided to give it to a museum." She collaborated with the original architect John Staub on structural changes that would prepare the home to be a museum. She denuded the home of personal items and items that did not meet her concept; the only piece of non-American furniture in the home was her English dining table, which had too many memories for her to remove it.

Several residents of River Oaks sued to prevent Bayou Bend becoming a museum, but Hogg prevailed in court. To alleviate the residents' concerns over increased traffic, she asked the city of Houston to build a footbridge over Buffalo Bayou so that visitors could reach the house without having to drive through River Oaks. In the fall of 1965, Hogg moved out of her home, telling the docents that "When you love something enough it's easy to give it up in order to see it go on." The MFAH opened the new museum to the public in 1966 as MFAH's Bayou Bend Collection and Gardens. At its dedication, Charles F. Montgomery called Bayou Bend "the largest, finest collection this side of Winterthur".

In 1963, Hogg purchased property near Round Top, hoping to move its historic building to Bayou Bend. When that plan proved impractical, she decided to restore it in place and temporarily moved to Round Top. After personally supervising the restoration of the Winedale Inn, a stagecoach inn near Round Top, Hogg donated the property to the University of Texas at Austin. Known as the Winedale Historical Center, it is used primarily as an outdoor museum and music center, and annually hosts Shakespeare at Winedale. In 1969, she restored her parents' house in Quitman; the town renamed it the Ima Hogg Museum in her honor. The museum holds items from the history of Wood County and northeast Texas. She later restored the home of her maternal grandfather and had it moved to the park.

== Description and disposition ==
David Warren, the first curator of Bayou Bend, said Hogg was "small and dainty and feminine—and smart and sharp and knowledgeable—all rolled into one". Her biographer Bernhard described her as "elegantly and stylishly dressed", 5 feet 2 inches (157 cm) tall and of fair complexion, "independent and self-possessed" and noted that she could "sugarcoat her single-mindedness with layers of charm". At the age of 81, she was described by The New York Times as a "blue-eyed strawberry blonde".

One morning in 1914, Hogg was awakened by a burglar in her bedroom. She confronted the man, who was attempting to steal her jewelry, and not only convinced him to return the jewelry, but "wrote down a name and address, handed it to him and told him to go there that very day to get a job". When asked why she did that, Hogg responded, "He didn't look like a bad man." Later that year, she sailed to Germany, alone. While she was en route, Archduke Franz Ferdinand of Austria was assassinated, and the day before she arrived, Britain declared war on Germany. The United States was still neutral, however, so Hogg continued her tour of Europe, not leaving until several months later.

Though Bernhard describes Hogg as a woman of "unfailing politeness", the biographer suggests the philanthropist was not without adversaries. For instance, at a concert arranged by the Houston Symphony for her 90th birthday featuring the elderly pianist Arthur Rubinstein, he characterized her as a "tiresome old woman". Hogg, in turn, regarded the musician as "a pompous old man". By contrast, Hogg said of Vladimir Horowitz, whom she met backstage at a 1975 concert in Houston, "Such a nice man. Not at all like that Mr. Rubinstein."

Hogg was a generous benefactor, and believed that "inherited money was a public trust". She was described by the University of Houston as "compassionate by nature", "progressive in outlook", "concerned with the welfare of all Texans", a "zealous proponent of mental health care" and "committed to public education". Hogg was a lifelong Democrat.

== Death ==
Hogg died on August 19, 1975, at the age of 93, from a heart attack resulting from atheroma. She had been vacationing in London at the time, but fell as she was getting into a taxi, and died a few days later in a London hospital. An autopsy report revealed that her death was not related to the earlier fall. On receiving news of her death, the University of Texas declared two days of mourning and flew the flag at half-staff.

At the time of her death, Hogg had employed her personal maid, Gertrude Vaughn, for 56 years, and her butler-chauffeur, Lucious Broadnax, for over 40 years. She is buried next to her family in the Oakwood Cemetery in Austin. Hogg's work lives on through the Ima Hogg Foundation, which she founded in 1964 and which was the major beneficiary of her will. Hogg never married; her biographer Bernhard reports that she told a friend "she had gotten over 30 proposals of marriage but 'wouldn't have any of them'".

== Awards, recognition and legacy ==
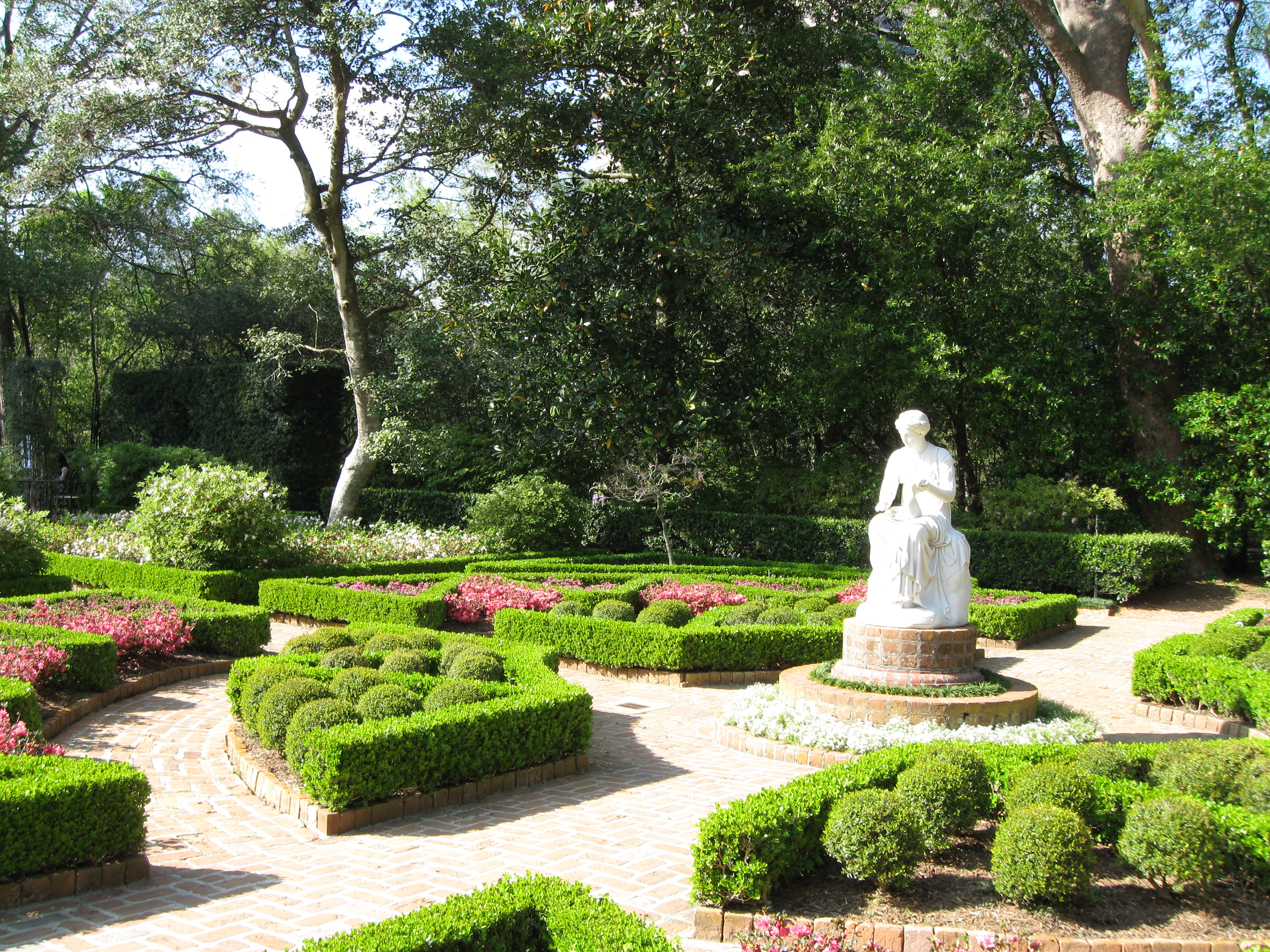
View of the gardens at Bayou Bend

Hogg received many awards for her contributions to the community. The Garden Club of America honored her in 1959 with the Amy Angell Colliers Montague Model for Civic Achievement. In 1966, she was honored at the 20th annual awards banquet of the National Trust for Historic Preservation. She received the seventh annual Louise du Pont Crowninshield Award—the highest award given by the National Trust for Historic Preservation—for "superlative achievement in the preservation, restoration and interpretation of sites, buildings, architecture, districts, and objects of national historical or cultural significance" in Texas.

In 1968, Hogg became the first recipient of the Santa Rita Award—the highest award given by the University of Texas System—for contributions to higher education. She was presented with an honorary doctorate in fine arts from Southwestern University in 1971. In 1969, she became the third woman (after Lady Bird Johnson and Oveta Culp Hobby) invited to become a member of the Academy of Texas, a society which recognized efforts to "enrich, enlarge or enlighten" knowledge in any field. She also became the first female president in the 110-year history of the Philosophical Society of Texas.

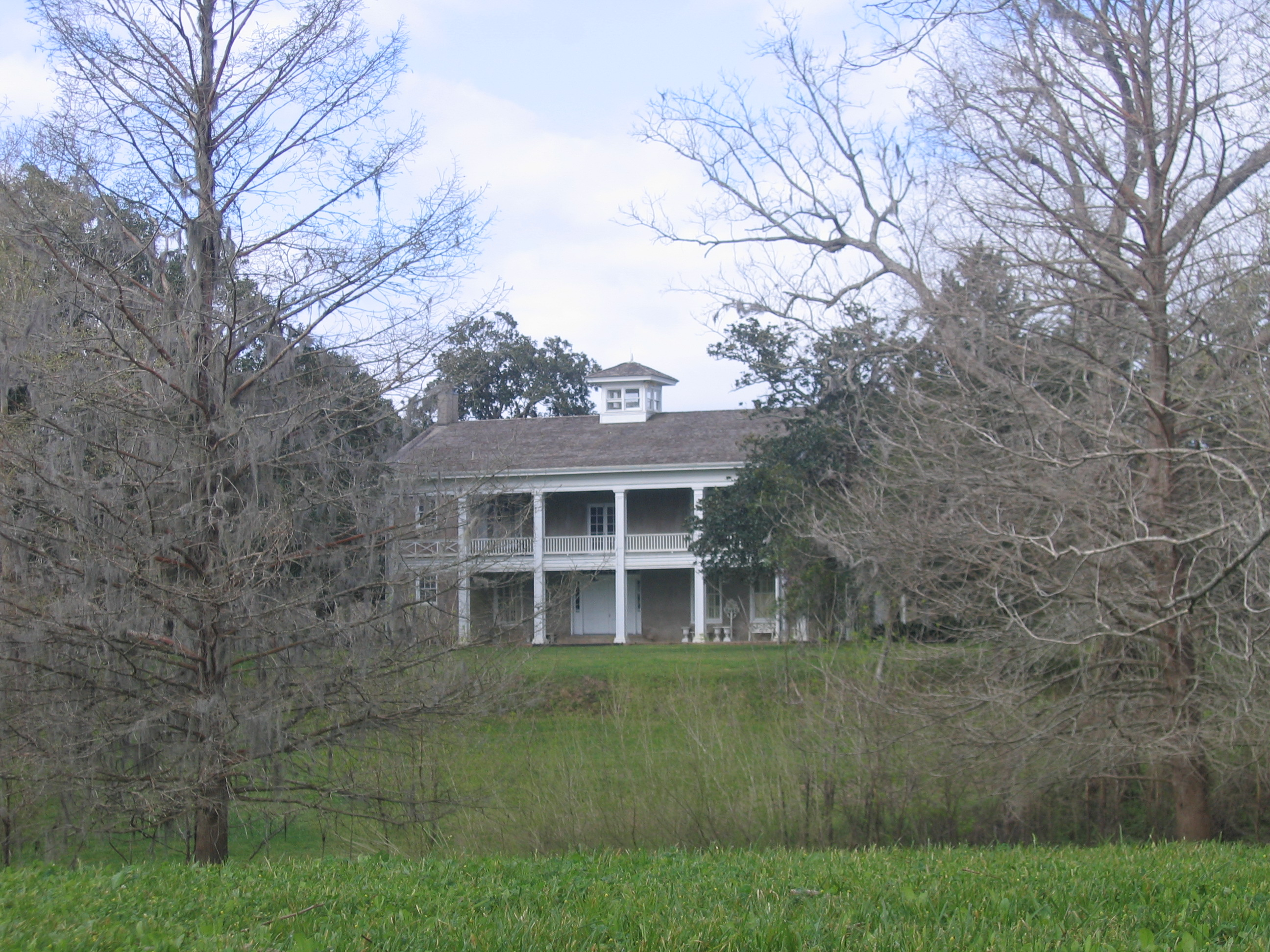
Hogg restored the original entrance to Varner–Hogg, which was built in 1832. This is now the back of the house. She later donated the plantation to the state of Texas.

Her restoration work was recognized by many organizations. The National Society of Interior Designers named her to their International Honors List in 1965 and in 1972 presented her with their Thomas Jefferson Award for her contributions to cultural heritage. The Texas State Historical Survey Committee recognized Hogg in 1967 for her "meritorious service in historic preservation" and the American Association of State and Local History gave her an award of merit in 1969.

The Houston Symphony established a scholarship in Hogg's name, honored her on her 90th birthday with a special concert, and holds an annual Ima Hogg Young Artist Competition for musicians between the ages of 13 and 30 who perform on orchestral instruments or the piano. The Dolph Briscoe Center for American History at the University of Texas at Austin presents an annual Ima Hogg Award for Historical Achievement. She was a National Patroness of Delta Omicron, an international professional music fraternity. Mental Health America of Greater Houston (established in 1954 as The Mental Health Association of Greater Houston) presents an annual Ima Hogg Award "to an individual or couple who have advanced mental health causes".

The site of her birthplace at 125 N. Line Street in Mineola, Texas is marked with a Texas Historical Commission subject marker.

In 1963, former Governor of Texas Allan Shivers—when presenting Hogg with the Distinguished Alumnus Award of the University of Texas Ex-Students Association (the first woman so honored)—said of "Miss Ima":

Some persons create history.
Some record it.
Others restore and conserve it.
She has done all three.
