= Hogg Foundation for Mental Health =

Mental health advocacy organization

- Formation: 1940; 86 years ago
- Founder: Hogg Family
- Headquarters: Austin, Texas
- Website: hogg.utexas.edu
- Formerly called: The Hogg Foundation of Mental Hygiene

The Hogg Foundation for Mental Health is a grantmaking organization with the mission to improve the mental health of Texans. As a unit of the Steve Hicks School of Social Work at The University of Texas at Austin, the Foundation seeks to bolster conditions that support mental health and eliminate conditions that harm mental health.

== History ==
=== 1940-1970 ===
The Hogg Foundation of Mental Hygiene was founded in 1940 by the Hogg family. Ima Hogg, in conjunction with her brother Mike, used the $2.5 million endowment from the estate of their late brother, William C. Hogg, to fund the organization.

Foundation leadership held an inaugural conference on February 11-13, 1941 to bring representatives of mental health, philanthropy, and education from Texas and across the nation together to discuss practical applications for new mental health practices in everyday community life.

The Foundation sponsored a series of lecture tours, colloquially known as “circuit riders for mental health,” in which Hogg Foundation staff and individuals sponsored by the Hogg Foundation traveled across Texas speaking on the importance of preventative and therapeutic approaches to mental health issues from 1941 to 1944.

Beginning in 1949, the Foundation worked with the Texas Medical Association to fund a reform campaign entitled “The Shame of Texas,” which sought to emphasize the deplorable conditions of Texas mental hospitals via a series of newspaper articles.

In 1957, the Foundation was renamed to the Hogg Foundation for Mental Health. Also in 1957, the Foundation worked with the UT Law School to draft Texas’s first Mental Health Code.

In August 1966, the UT Tower shooting took place which prompted a series of mental health reforms across Texas.

=== 1971-Present ===
Throughout the early 1970s, the foundation focused on funding mental health services for historically underrepresented groups across Texas.

In 1971, foundation leaders worked with University of Texas Health Science Center at San Antonio (UTHSCSA) faculty and community leaders of Crystal City in South Texas to discuss the development of the Zavala County Mental Health Outreach Program, which was intended to establish mental health services for the Hispanic population in the area. The program struggled to meet the specific linguistic, financial, and personal needs of the community.

In 1972, the foundation hosted the first National Congress of Black Professionals in Higher Education, a three-day conference that focused on the need for more Black administrators in policy-influencing positions at academic institutions, increased support for Black students, and the development of curriculum and policies that would meet the needs of Black individuals.

From 1990 to 1995, the foundation carried out “School of the Future,” a $2 million initiative to provide increased health services in Austin, Dallas, Houston, and San Antonio schools. The program focused on early intervention for low-income students and their families.

== Leadership ==
The following individuals have served as Executive Directors of the Hogg Foundation:

- Robert Lee Sutherland, 1940-1970
- Wayne H. Holtzman, 1970-1993
- Dr. Charles M. Bonjean, 1993-2003
- Dr. King Davis, 2003-2008
- Dr. Octavio N. Martinez, Jr., 2008-Present

== Programs ==
=== Ongoing awards ===
- Established in 1956, the Ima Hogg Scholarship provides $5,000 to individuals pursuing their Master’s degrees in Social Work at accredited Texas-based graduate schools.
- Established in 1974, the Frances Fowler Wallace Memorial Award provides up to $3,000 of research-related financial assistance for doctoral students’ dissertation research regarding mental health.
- Established in 1995, the Harry E. and Bernice M. Moore Fellowship provides a one-time award of $20,000 to a student completing a dissertation relevant to the mental health needs of Texans.
- Established in 2010, the Hogg Foundation Policy Academy and Fellows program offers ten organizations a two-year grant to employ policy or peer policy fellows to increase the organizations’ and the individuals’ capacity to advance mental health policy in Texas.

=== Major initiatives ===
- Funding the East Texas Coalition for Mental Health Recovery, which was launched in 2010 as an experimental program to build leadership in the field of mental health in east Texas.
- Hosting the inaugural PeerFest, “educational and celebratory event for Texans who have faced mental health challenges and are on a journey to recovery.” This four-day event took place in April 2016 in Corpus Christi. The event was considered a success by organizers and attendees and has served as a Texas-based version of the Alternatives Conference, an annual event put on by the National Coalition for Mental Health Recovery.
- Awarding $4.5 million in grants to six organizations to support mental health initiatives in rural Texas counties, known as the Well-being in Rural Communities initiative.
- Launching Communities of Care in June 2019, an initiative that supports collaborative approaches to health and well-being in the Houston area. With a total of $11.5 million in grant funds to be distributed to eleven organizations over a five-year period, this initiative aims to address institutional inequities that complicate issues of mental health and well-being.
- Funding efforts to support completion and accuracy of the 2020 U.S. census. The Hogg Foundation awarded $2.1 million in grant funds to 28 organizations to ensure that all Texans would be counted. Of particular concern were regions that have historically been undercounted and therefore underfunded.
- Convening the Robert Lee Sutherland Seminar, a biyearly event put on by the Hogg Foundation that aims to increase awareness of current mental health issues in the field.
- Preparing a new edition of A Guide to Understanding Mental Health Systems and Services in Texas to coincide with each Texas legislative session to help inform mental health and substance use policy analysis, development and decision-making.
