= Bayou Bend Collection and Gardens =

- Bayou Bend
- U.S. National Register of Historic Places
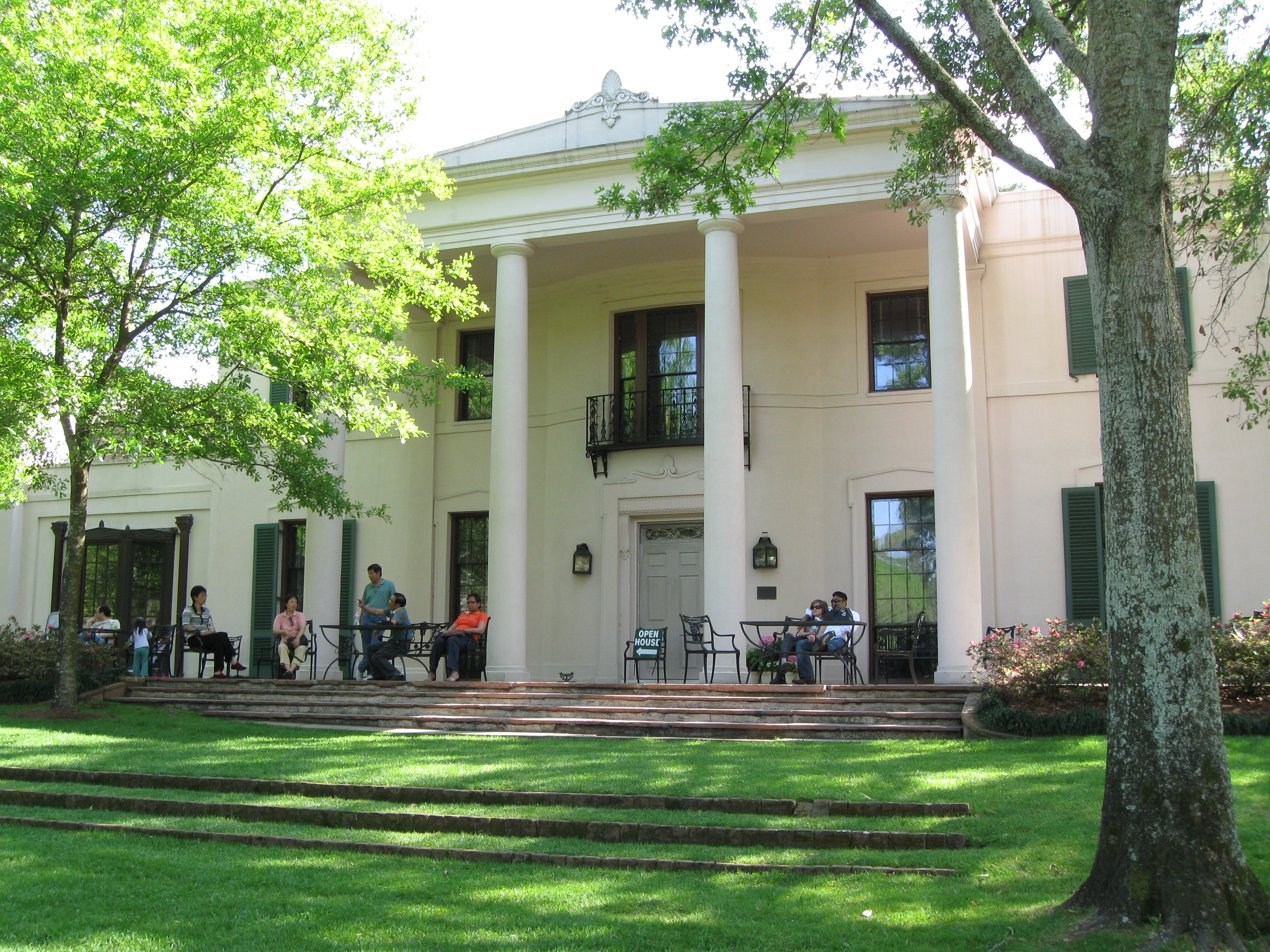

- Location within Texas Location within the United States
- Location: 1 Westcott St., Houston, Texas
- Coordinates: 29°45′27″N 95°25′14″W
- Area: 15 acres (6.1 ha)
- Built: 1927
- Architect: John F. Staub
- Architectural style: Neoclassical Revival, English Regency
- NRHP reference No.: 79002954
- Added to NRHP: December 6, 1979

Bayou Bend Collection and Gardens, located in the River Oaks community in Houston, Texas, United States, is a 14-acre (57,000 m^{2}) facility of the Museum of Fine Arts, Houston (MFAH) that houses a collection of decorative art, paintings and furniture. Bayou Bend is the former home of Houston philanthropist Ima Hogg. Bayou Bend was marked with a Texas Historical Commission marker in 1973 and was listed in the National Register of Historic Places in 1979.

== Mansion and gardens ==
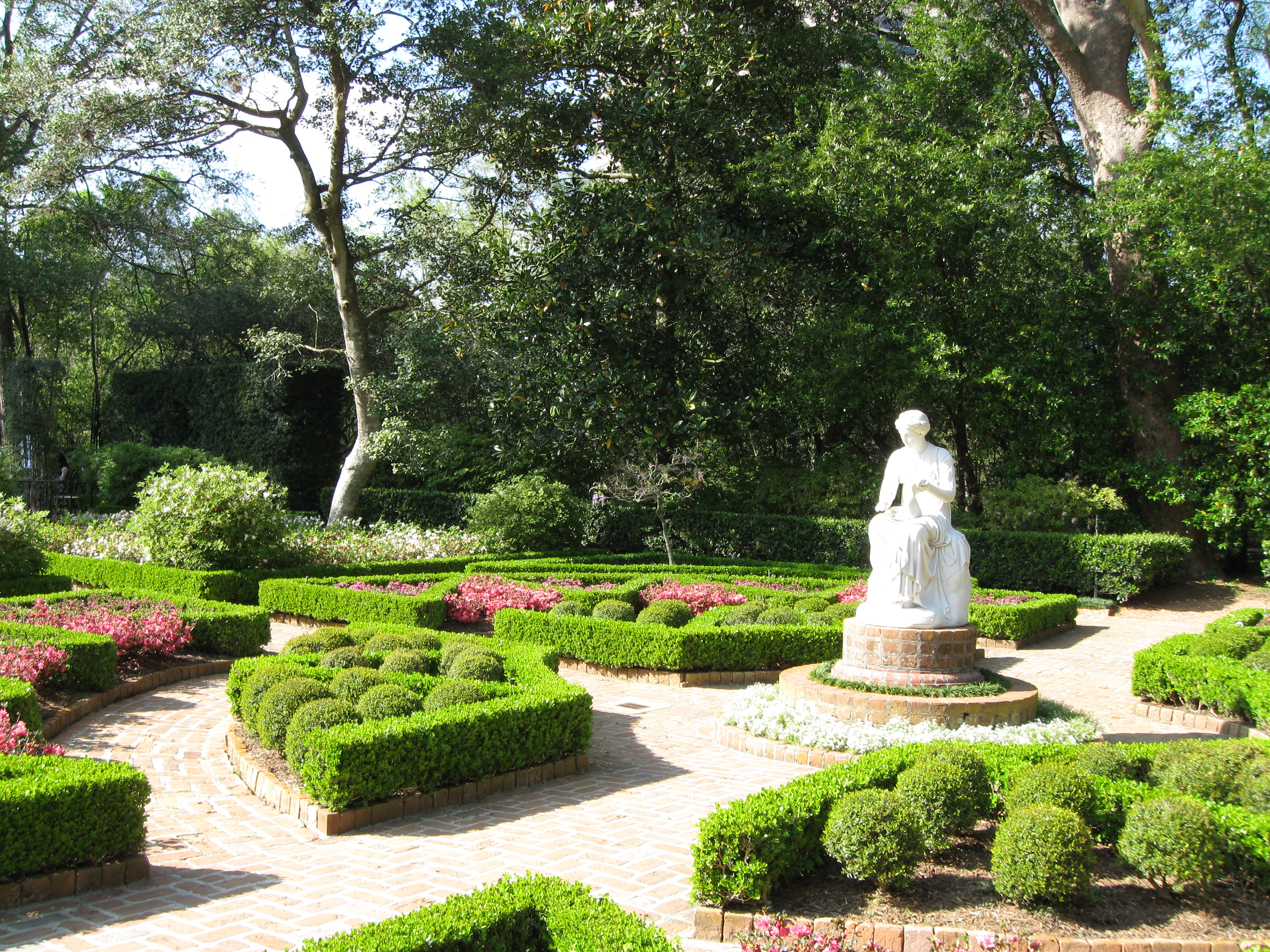
Clio Garden at Bayou Bend

The mansion, designed by architect John F. Staub, was built between 1927 and 1928 for Ima Hogg and her brothers, William C. and Michael Hogg. Covered in towering trees and thick undergrowth, the home site was, in Miss Hogg's words, "nothing but a dense thicket". The home was one of the first to be located in the River Oaks neighborhood developed by the Hogg brothers. During construction, Ima Hogg insisted that as many trees as possible be kept. Only one tree was sacrificed to make room for the house, and the gardens were created around the existing trees. Ima Hogg gave the home its name, over the objection of her brother Will, who said the name was "too muddy and 'muskeetery' and malarial". Ima responded that "not everyone can have a bayou".

Miss Hogg created a series of gardens that were intended as outdoor rooms for living and entertaining. In 1957, Miss Hogg donated her home, gardens, and her collection to the Museum of Fine Arts, Houston. Bayou Bend opened to the public in 1966. The facility currently houses 2,600 objects within 28 period rooms.

Staub's plan for Bayou Bend combined eighteenth-century Georgian architecture with elements that are distinctly Southern and of Spanish Creole architecture. Other aspects of Bayou Bend's design are borrowed from Southern plantation houses. The interiors borrow more heavily from the architectural traditions of the North. Staub incorporated floorboards and paneling from two eighteenth-century Massachusetts houses in Miss Hogg's bedroom and sitting room. In February 1999, the city of Houston named Bayou Bend an official city landmark.

The heavily wooded 14 acres (5.7 ha) along Buffalo Bayou include eight formal gardens. Three of the gardens are named for a statue of a goddess or muse displayed in the garden, Clio, Diana and Euturpe. The other gardens are named White, East, Butterfly and Carla. In September 2008, the winds of Hurricane Ike caused extensive damage to the gardens. Although none of the statues were damaged, between 65 and 70% of the pine trees on the grounds had fallen, as had an American holly tree, which at 55 feet (17 m) was the tallest of its kind in Harris County, Texas. Bart Brechter, the Curator of Gardens at the museum, estimated that it would take 5 months to clear the debris and could take years to bring the gardens to their former state.

== Collection ==
The collection at Bayou Bend presently consists of approximately 4,700 objects that reflect historic and stylistic periods from 1620 to 1870 installed in some 28 period room settings that showcase American decorative arts from 1620 through 1876. Miss Hogg began assembling this important collection of American decorative arts in 1920. To provide suitable settings for these extraordinary antiques, Staub designed simple but stately interiors in the style of colonial American rooms.

In 1920, while sitting for a portrait by artist Wayman Adams, Miss Hogg admired a simple armchair belonging to the artist that was made in colonial America and later obtained a similar Queen Anne chair for herself. Almost half a century later, Miss Hogg acquired the very same chair that she had first seen in Adams' studio. "From the time I acquired my first Queen Anne armchair in 1920, I had an unaccountable compulsion to make an American collection for some Texas museum." The collection also contains notable objects from outside America, including English ceramics used in Colonial America.

== See also ==
- Ima Hogg
- Museum of Fine Arts, Houston
- List of museums in the Texas Gulf Coast
