= State and Nationally Designated Historic Sites and Buildings in Wood County, Texas =

The following is a list of state or nationally designated historic sites and buildings in Wood County, Texas.

== List ==
State and Nationally Designated Historic Sites in Wood County, Texas
Marker Or Site Name	Location	Type Of Marker/Site
Birthplace of Ima Hogg	125 N. Line Street, Mineola, Texas	Historical (Subject) Marker, Texas Hist. Comm.
C. W. Raines	114 W. Commerce, Mineola, Texas	Historical (Subject) Marker, Texas Hist. Comm.
Caddo Indian Communities in Wood County	Cap Ranch Rd (CR 2724), 1.9 mi E of Loop 564, Mineola, Texas	Historical (Subject) Marker, Texas Hist. Comm.
Callaway House	512 N. Sycamore, Mineola, Texas	Recorded Texas Historic Landmark (RTHL)
Captain Henry Stout	FM 2088, 9 mi. East of Quitman, Texas	Historical (Subject) Marker, Texas Hist. Comm.
Central Christian Church (Disciples of Christ) of Winnsboro	110 Sage Street, Winnsboro, Texas	Recorded Texas Historic Landmark (RTHL)
Chalybeate Springs	3 mi. E of Winnsboro on State Highway 11 at intersection of County Road 4350	Historical (Subject) Marker, Texas Hist. Comm.
Clover Hill Cemetery	Farm to Market Road 69, 5 mi. N of Quitman, Texas.	Historical (Subject) Marker, Texas Hist. Comm.
Col. James A. Stinson Home	In Jim Hogg City Park, Quitman, Texas	Historical (Subject) Marker, Texas Hist. Comm.
Collins-Haines Home	1/2 mile Southeast of Quitman on Farm to Market Road 778 (Also Horton Street)	Recorded Texas Historic Landmark (RTHL)
Concord Cemetery	6 mi. Southeast of Quitman at the intersection of farm to Market Road 778 at County Road 2590	Historical (Subject) Marker, Texas Hist. Comm.
Corbitt Home	13 mi. Southeast of Winnsboro, off FM 2088	Recorded Texas Historic Landmark (RTHL)
Dr. Adolphus Leander Patten	In Mineola City Cemetery (Also known as Cedars Memorial Gardens)	Historical (Subject) Marker, Texas Hist. Comm.
Dr Pepper Bottling Plant	122 N. Johnson Street, Mineola, Texas	Historical (Subject) Marker, Texas Hist. Comm.
East Point Missionary Baptist Church	9 mi. South of Winnsboro on FM 312, then 1/4 mi. East on Farm to Market Road 2088	Historical (Subject) Marker, Texas Hist. Comm.
First Baptist Church of Mineola	204 N. Johnson Street, Mineola, Texas	Historical (Subject) Marker, Texas Hist. Comm.
First Baptist Church of Quitman	Intersection of N. College Street (also known as Sissy Spacek Drive) & E. Lane, Quitman, Texas.	Historical (Subject) Marker, Texas Hist. Comm.
First Baptist Church of Winnsboro	Corner of Elm & Mill Streets, Winnsboro, Texas	Historical (Subject) Marker, Texas Hist. Comm.
First Election in Wood County	FM 49, 3.2 miles E of Mineola, Texas	Historical (Subject) Marker, Texas Hist. Comm.
First Methodist Church of Winnsboro	301 Church Street, Winnsboro, Texas	Historical (Subject) Marker, Texas Hist. Comm.
First National Bank Building	101 E. Broad, Mineola, Texas	Recorded Texas Historic Landmark (RTHL)
First National Bank of Mineola	200 N. Pacific at Kilpatrick, Mineola, Texas	Historical (Subject) Marker, Texas Hist. Comm.
First Presbyterian Church of Winnsboro		Historical (Subject) Marker, Texas Hist. Comm.
Flora Lodge No. 119, A.F. & A.M.		Historical (Subject) Marker, Texas Hist. Comm.
Florence Robinson Cottage		National Register of Historic Places Listed Property
George C. Reeves (Aug. 31, 1854 - Aug. 29, 1934)		Historical (Subject) Marker, Texas Hist. Comm.
Gov. James Stephen Hogg and Wood County		Historical (Subject) Marker, Texas Hist. Comm.
Government Projects in Mineola		Historical (Subject) Marker, Texas Hist. Comm.
Haines, George W., Site		National Register of Historic Places Listing
Harry W. Meredith		Historical (Subject) Marker, Texas Hist. Comm.
Hopewell Church and Cemetery		Historical (Subject) Marker, Texas Hist. Comm.
Howle Site		National Register of Historic Places Listing
Indian Cemetery and Villages		Historical (Subject) Marker, Texas Hist. Comm.
J. H. Jones and the Old Settlers Reunion Grounds		Historical (Subject) Marker, Texas Hist. Comm.
James Stephen Hogg		Historical (Subject) Marker, Texas Hist. Comm.
James Stephen Hogg's Early Home		Recorded Texas Historic Landmark (RTHL)
Jarvis Christian College		Historical (Subject) Marker, Texas Hist. Comm.
Jobe Cemetery		Historical (Subject) Marker, Texas Hist. Comm.
John Creighton Buchanan		Historical (Subject) Marker, Texas Hist. Comm.
Lankford-Stinson House		Recorded Texas Historic Landmark (RTHL)
Lee Cemetery		Historical (Subject) Marker, Texas Hist. Comm.
Lillian Richard		Historical (Subject) Marker, Texas Hist. Comm.
Little Hope Missionary Baptist Church		Historical (Subject) Marker, Texas Hist. Comm.
Lott, Howard L. and Vivian W., House		Recorded Texas Historic Landmark (RTHL). National Register of Historic Places Listing
Macedonia School		Historical (Subject) Marker, Texas Hist. Comm.
Marcus DeWitt Carlock House		Recorded Texas Historic Landmark (RTHL). National Register of Historic Places Listing
Martin Varner		Historical (Subject) Marker, Texas Hist. Comm.
Mineola		Historical (Subject) Marker, Texas Hist. Comm.
Mineola Black Spiders		Historical (Subject) Marker, Texas Hist. Comm.
Mineola Downtown Historic District		National Register of Historic Places Listing
Mineola Fire Department		Historical (Subject) Marker, Texas Hist. Comm.
Mineola Masonic Lodge No. 502, A.F. & A.M.		Historical (Subject) Marker, Texas Hist. Comm.
Mineola Opera Houses		Historical (Subject) Marker, Texas Hist. Comm.
Mineola Post Office		Recorded Texas Historic Landmark
Mineola Public Library		Historical (Subject) Marker, Texas Hist. Comm.
Mineola's Jewish Community		Historical (Subject) Marker, Texas Hist. Comm.
Moody, Joseph and Martha, Farmstead		National Register of Historic Places Listing
Moody, Ned, Site		National Register of Historic Places Listing
Mountain Home		Historical (Subject) Marker, Texas Hist. Comm.
Mt. Pisgah Baptist Church		Historical (Subject) Marker, Texas Hist. Comm.
Myrtle Springs Baptist Church, BMA		Historical (Subject) Marker, Texas Hist. Comm.
New Hope Baptist Church		Historical (Subject) Marker, Texas Hist. Comm.
New Hope Cemetery		Historical (Subject) Marker, Texas Hist. Comm.
O. P. Pyle House		Recorded Texas Historic Landmark
Old Bailey Hotel		Recorded Texas Historic Landmark
Old Winnsboro Cemetery		Historical (Subject) Marker, Texas Hist. Comm.
Osborn Site		National Register of Historic Places Listing
Perryville Baptist Church		Historical (Subject) Marker, Texas Hist. Comm.
Perryville Methodist Church		Historical (Subject) Marker, Texas Hist. Comm.
Pleasant Grove School & Cemetery		Historical (Subject) Marker, Texas Hist. Comm.
Railroads in Mineola		Historical (Subject) Marker, Texas Hist. Comm.
Removal of Cherokees		Historical (Subject) Marker, Texas Hist. Comm.
Reneau Building		Recorded Texas Historic Landmark
Reuben Leon and Fairess (Clark) Simmons		Historical (Subject) Marker, Texas Hist. Comm.
Richard Malcolm Smith		Historical (Subject) Marker, Texas Hist. Comm.
Robert N. Stafford		Historical (Subject) Marker, Texas Hist. Comm.
Rock Hill Baptist Church		Historical (Subject) Marker, Texas Hist. Comm.
Rosenwald Schools in Wood County		Historical (Subject) Marker, Texas Hist. Comm.
Sadler Site		National Register Of Historic Places Listing
Saloons in Mineola		Historical (Subject) Marker, Texas Hist. Comm.
Sand Springs Cemetery		Historical (Subject) Marker, Texas Hist. Comm.
Sarah Rosalie Patten Buchanan		Historical (Subject) Marker, Texas Hist. Comm.
Select Theater		Historical (Subject) Marker, Texas Hist. Comm.
Shady Grove Cemetery		Historical (Subject) Marker, Texas Hist. Comm.
Site of Coleman Family Drug Store and Clinic		Historical (Subject) Marker, Texas Hist. Comm.
Site of Little Indiana School		Historical (Subject) Marker, Texas Hist. Comm.
Site of Public Mineral Water Well		Historical (Subject) Marker, Texas Hist. Comm.
Smith Chapel United Methodist Church		Historical (Subject) Marker, Texas Hist. Comm.
Smyrna Baptist Church		Historical (Subject) Marker, Texas Hist. Comm.
St. Paul Missionary Baptist Church		Historical (Subject) Marker, Texas Hist. Comm.
The Cathey Buildings		Recorded Texas Historic Landmark
The Thomas Breen Family		Historical (Subject) Marker, Texas Hist. Comm.
Willard Cemetery		Historical (Subject) Marker, Texas Hist. Comm.
William Jesse McDonald		Historical (Subject) Marker, Texas Hist. Comm.
Williams Medical Clinic Building		Recorded Texas Historic Landmark
Wisener Field		Historical (Subject) Marker, Texas Hist. Comm.
Wood County		Historical (Subject) Marker, Texas Hist. Comm.
Wood County Courthouse		Recorded Texas Historic Landmark
