= Batts Hall =

Building in Austin, Texas, United States

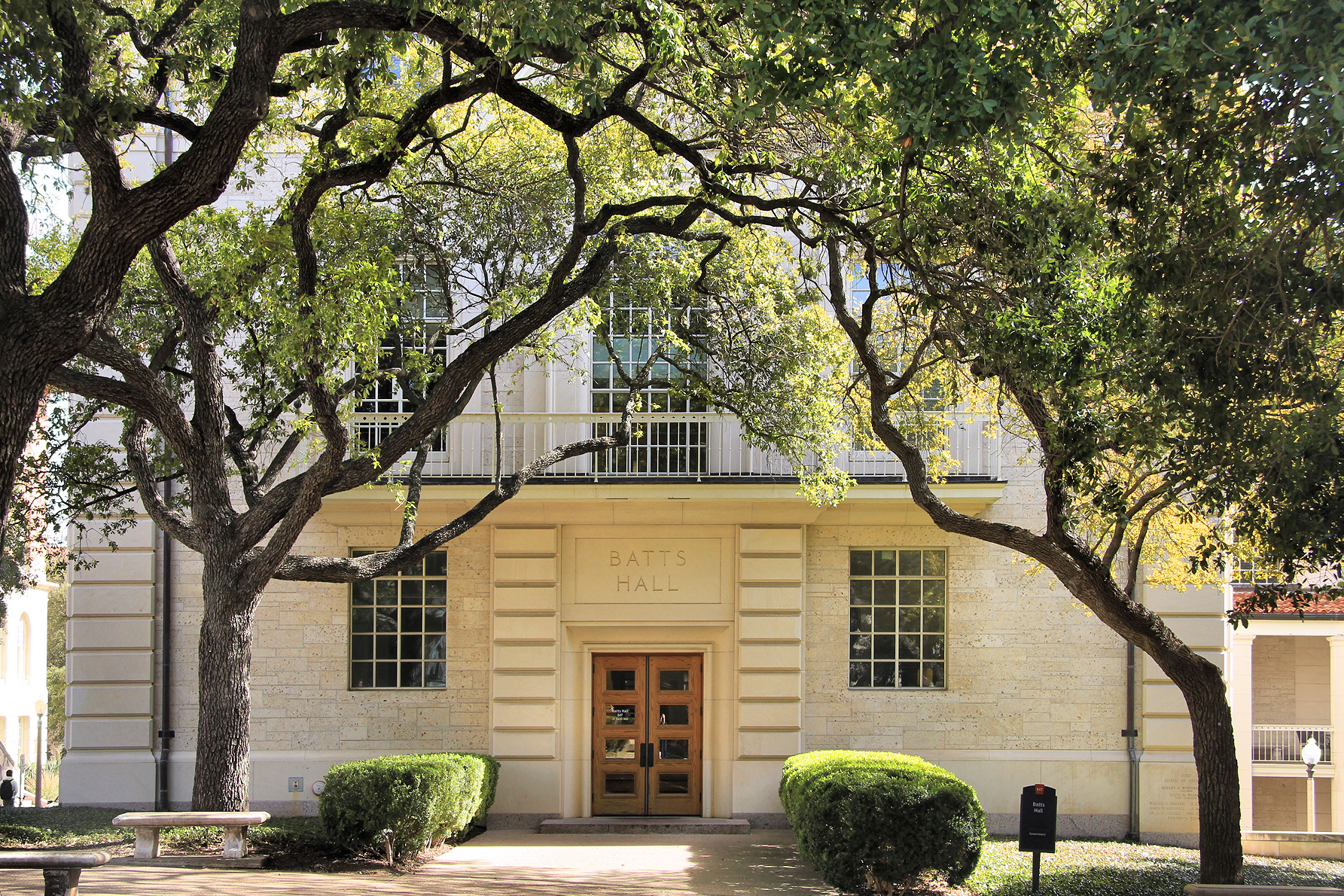
- The building's exterior in 2014
- Interactive map of the Batts Hall area
- Etymology: Robert Batts

General information
- Location: 158 West 21st Street, Austin, Texas, United States
- Coordinates: 30.2848°N 97.7389°W
- Year built: 1952–1953

Technical details
- Floor count: 5
- Floor area: 39,143 sq ft (3,636.5 m^{2})

Batts Hall (abbreviated BAT) is a building on the South Mall of the University of Texas at Austin campus in Austin, Texas, United States. The five-floor, 39,143-square-foot structure is named after Robert Lynn Batts.

== History ==
The building was constructed during 1952–1953, and named after former law professor and Board of Regents chairman Robert Lynn Batts. It was dedicated "to the study and teaching of modern foreign languages that men may understand one another". Dr. Robert Haden Williams, a professor of Romance languages, helped plan and design the structure.

In 1965, Harry H. Ransom delivered his "State of the University" speech in Batts' auditorium, launching the 'Texas Today and Tomorrow' series' fourth annual convocation. The building housed the Departments of Germanic, Romantic and Slavic Languages, as of 1973.
